= Gas Nation =

Studio album by J. Stalin
- Released: 2008
- Genre: Gangsta rap, hyphy, West Coast hip hop
- Label: SMC, Town Thizzness, Livewire Records, Thizz

J. Stalin chronology
On Behalf of the Streets	Gas Nation	Prenuptial Agreement

Gas Nation is Bay Area rapper J. Stalin's second album, released in 2008. Gas Nation was named Bay Area Album of the Year by SFGate.com, beating out San Quinn's From a Boy to a Man.

== Track listing ==
1. "Lyrical Exercise"
2. "My Niggaz"
3. "Self Destruction"
4. "Cocaine Cowboys"
5. "I'm Back (Feelin Like Mac Dre)"
6. "Millionaire Status" (featuring R.O.B.) (prod. by Trackademicks)
7. "Brand New Jordans"
8. "I Say" (featuring Shady Nate)
9. "Lil Weed Lil Xtc" (featuring Kaz Kyzah & Stevie Joe)
10. "Try Again Tomorrow"
11. "You Heard What I Said" (featuring Dem Hoodstarz)
12. "Ridin Ridin"
13. "Stressed Out" (Lil Blood Solo)
14. "Down My Road"
15. "She Ain't Nothin" (featuring Beeda Weeda & Jay Jonah)
16. "My Mind" (featuring 10ak)
17. "Wanna Get On" (featuring Lil Blood)
18. "Every Nigga Round Me"
19. "Can't Judge Me" (featuring G-Stack)
20. "Thunder Dome" (Philthy Rich Solo)
