= Prenuptial Agreement (album) =

Studio album by J. Stalin
- Released: January 12, 2010
- Genre: West Coast hip hop; gangsta rap
- Length: 1:19:45
- Label: SMC Recordings
- Producer: J. Stalin (exec.); Adam "Swerve" Trujillo; Cinematik; DJ Fresh; Jallah Keys; Joe Millionaire; Kareem K; Mekanix; Mike Rizmo; SK; Sneaky Mike; Traxamillion; Troy "Tha Rolla" Sanders

J. Stalin chronology
Giants & Elephants (2009)	Prenuptial Agreement (2010)	Memoirs of a Curb Server (2012)

Prenuptial Agreement is the sixth studio album by American rapper J. Stalin. It was released on January 12, 2010 via SMC Recordings. Production was handled by Adam "Swerve" Trujillo, the Mekanix, Mike Rizmo, Cinematik, DJ Fresh, Jallah Keys, Joe Millionaire, Kareem K, SK, Sneaky Mike, Traxamillion and Troy "Tha Rolla" Sanders. It features guest appearances from Shady Nate, 211, E Da Singa, Lil' Blood, E-40, Dubb 20, Glasses Malone, Jallah Keys, Jay Jonah, Lil' Kev, Lil Retro, Matt Blaque, Messy Marv, Mistah F.A.B., Philthy Rich, San Quinn, SK, Stevie Joe, The Jacka and Too $hort. The album peaked at #71 on the Top R&B/Hip-Hop Albums chart and at #18 on the Heatseekers Albums chart.

== Critical reception ==
Professional ratings
Review scores
Source	Rating
AllMusic	3.5/5 stars
HipHopDX	3/5
Pitchfork	7.9/10

Prenuptial Agreement was met with generally favorable reviews from critics. At Album of the Year, which assigns a normalized rating out of 100 to reviews from mainstream publications, the album received an average score of 70 based on three reviews.

== Track listing ==
No.	Title	Producer(s)	Length
1.	"Lyrical Exercise 2" (featuring Shady Nate)	Sneaky Mike	2:42
2.	"Rock Day"	The Mekanix	3:33
3.	"H.N.I.C." (featuring Messy Marv)	The Mekanix	3:59
4.	"Birthday"	Cinematikmuzik	3:37
5.	"Get Me Off" (featuring E-40 and E Da Sanga)	Kareem K	4:47
6.	""G" in Me" (featuring Lil Blood and Philthy Rich)	Sneaky Mike	3:38
7.	"Last Night" (featuring SK)	SK	2:57
8.	"D-Boy Blues 2010"	Traxamillion	3:43
9.	"Neighborhood Stars" (featuring Mistah F.A.B. and Too $hort)	Adam "Swerve" Trujillo	3:38
10.	"Don't Front"	Mike Rimzo	3:48
11.	"Self-Made Millionaire" (featuring Lil Blood, Lil Retro and E Da Sanga)	Mike Rimzo	4:41
12.	"Rockin wit' the Best"	Troy "Tha Rolla" Sanders	3:34
13.	"Stop My Shine" (featuring 211 and Glasses Malone)	Adam "Swerve" Trujillo	4:02
14.	"Something New" (featuring Lil' Kev)	Adam "Swerve" Trujillo	3:26
15.	"Like a Job to Me" (featuring Jay Jonah, 211 and Matt Blaque)	Joe Millionaire	4:19
16.	"Money on the Way" (featuring Shady Nate and Jallah)	Jallah Keys	2:52
17.	"When It's Real" (featuring Shady Nate, Dubb 20 and Teena Marie)	DJ Fresh	3:24
18.	"U Broke"	Adam "Swerve" Trujillo	2:52
19.	"Red & Blue Lights" (featuring The Jacka)	The Mekanix	3:54
20.	"When the Club Over" (featuring Stevie Joe)	Mike Rimzo	3:35
21.	"Posted" (featuring San Quinn)	Mike Rimzo	3:59
22.	"Show Me"	The Mekanix	2:42
Total length:			1:19:45
