= Neighborhood Supastar 3 =

Neighborhood Supastar, Pt. 3

Studio album by The Boy Boy Young Mess & Philthy Rich
- Released: June 28, 2011
- Genre: Rap
- Length: 55:02
- Label: Livewire Records, SMC Recordings
- Producer: AK-47, Benjamin Blast, Brilliant, D Dosia, Scorp Dezel, DJ Fresh, Izzy the Kid, Lil Jess, Livin' Proof, Dave Moss, Sean T, Sonic Sounds, Traxx FDR

The Boy Boy Young Mess & Philthy Rich chronology
Da Bidness 2 (2011)	Neighborhood Supastar, Pt. 3 (2011)	Paper Bag Money (2011)

Neighborhood Supastar, Pt. 3 is a collaboration album by American rappers The Boy Boy Young Mess and Philthy Rich, released in June 2011 via Livewire Records & SMC Recordings. The last of the Neighborhood Supastar series, it features guest appearances from Mistah F.A.B., J. Stalin, Glasses Malone, Rydah J. Klyde and Kafani, among others. It charted on the Heatseekers Pacific chart.

== Track listing ==
#	Title	length
1	Let a Muthaf****a Know	3:08
2	Find a New B***h (featuring Lil Blood)	3:59
3	Out the Way (featuring Stevie Joe & Magnolia Chop)	4:37
4	They Mad That I'm Icy (featuring Guce & Kafani)	5:28
5	Still Trip'n (featuring Dem Hoodstarz)	4:10
6	Can't Nobody Else (featuring J. Stalin)	4:34
7	Give Anything	2:31
8	I Bet	2:47
9	If It's Funk (featuring Lil Rue)	3:46
10	Don't Move (featuring V-White)	4:05
11	Get This Paper (featuring Glasses Malone & I-Rocc)	6:14
12	Try'n (featuring Mistah F.A.B. & London)	5:02
13	Project N***a (Remix) [featuring Rydah J. Klyde & Dubb 20]	4:41
