= On Behalf of the Streets =

Studio album by J. Stalin
- Released: 2006
- Genre: Gangsta Rap, Hyphy, West Coast Hip Hop
- Label: SMC, Livewire Records, Thizz

J. Stalin chronology
On Behalf of the Streets (2006)	Gas Nation (2008)

On Behalf of the Streets is the debut album from J. Stalin.

== Track listing ==
1. Intro
2. Actin Like... (featuring Laroo)
3. So Cold
4. That's My Name
5. I Was Told (featuring G-Stack)
6. Party Jumpin (featuring The Jacka)
7. The Function
8. Fuck U (featuring Mayback & Tamika)
9. Keep a Banger (featuring Polo)
10. 808
11. Get It Like Me (featuring Shady Nate & Nijay)
12. Put Cha Hands Up
13. Everyday (featuring Mistah F.A.B.)
14. 2 Pistols (featuring Husalah & Shady Nate)
15. In a Zone (featuring Keak da Sneak & Bavgate)
16. Reality (featuring Kaz Kyzah)
17. Banga Dance (featuring Shady Nate & Jay Jonah)
18. No One (featuring Shady Nate)
