= Armani Depaul =

American rapper (born 1988)

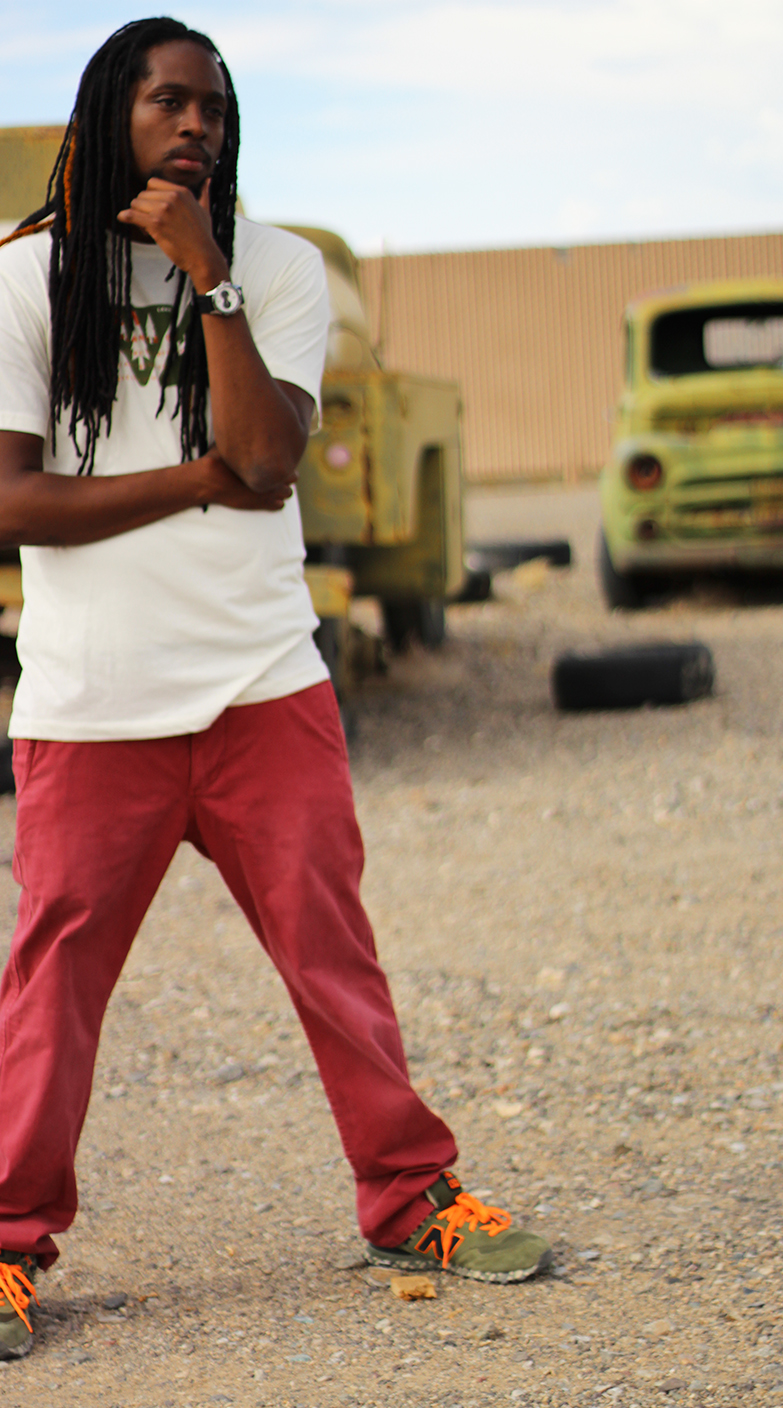

Background information
- Also known as: Flav; Armani de Paul; Armani DePaul
- Born: 1988 (age 37–38); Oakland, California
- Origin: Richmond, California
- Genres: Hip hop; R&B
- Occupations: Rapper; singer; songwriter; record producer; director
- Instruments: Vocals; DAW
- Years active: 2007–present
- Labels: Beach Boi Music; Rapbay; Urban life Distribution; INgrooves
- Website: ArmaniDepaul.com

Armani Depaul (born Oakland, California, 1988), also known as Flav, is an American rapper, singer, songwriter, record producer, and director. Based in the Bay Area in Northern California, he operates the independent label Beach Boi Music.

He has released a number of singles, and collaborated with artists such as Stevie Joe, Iamsu!, Kool John, DJ Fresh, and Sage the Gemini. In 2012 he contributed production to the track "Try'na Get On" off the J. Stalin album Memoirs of a Curb Server. Since 2012, he's had a number of music videos on VEVO.

== Early life ==
Armani Depaul was born in Oakland, California in 1988, and spent his childhood growing up in Richmond, California. Depaul developed an early interest in hip hop. His father was an artist and musician, and he'd join his father in the studio starting at age nine.

== Music career ==
=== Early years ===
Depaul started producing and writing rap and hip hop in 2002, and in 2006 Big Von on 106 KMEL put Depaul's first record "Cookies 'n Milk" into rotation. He soon after released one of his first music videos for the single. Depaul performed on BET's 106 & Park for "Wild Out Wednesday" in 2008, and opened for Akon in 2009.

Starting in 2010 he began putting out a new mixtape and music video every other month, a trend he continued until 2012. While in the Bay Area he has also written and produced tracks for artists including Philthy Rich, J. Stalin, Dorrough Music, Audio Push, Clyde Carson, and Iamsu!. He operates the independent label Beach Boi Music, on which he releases most of his solo material. Since 2012 he's had a number of singles released with music videos on music channel VEVO.

=== Memoirs of a Curb Server ===
Depaul contributed production to the track "Try'na Get On" off the J. Stalin album Memoirs of a Curb Server in July 2012. The album peaked at number 54 on the R&B/Hip-Hop Albums chart and at 16 on the Heatseekers Albums chart, making it J. Stalin's most successful album to date. The album features guest appearances from E-40, Mistah F.A.B., Too Short, Yukmouth, The Jacka and Richie Rich, among others. Music videos have been filmed for the song "Try'na Get On" featuring Armani de Paul and Philthy Rich.

=== Recent singles ===
His single "Ride On It" featuring Iamsu! and Kool John came out in July 2013, with a music video also released online. Released in December 2013 on Beach Boi Music, Rapbay, and Urbanlife Distribution, his digital track "A Million Ways" was a collaboration with AM Dre. The track featured Sage the Gemini as producer, with Gemini and Smoovie and Salty also featured. As of 2014 he continues to release singles online, such as "Steph Curry" in January.

He has a project with Dj.Fresh titled The Morning Show, due out in June 2014, and his independent release HashTag Flav is due out in the summer as well.

== Discography ==
=== Singles ===
Incomplete list of singles by Armani DePaul
Year	Single title	Release details
2012	"You Lookin' Too Good" (ft. Philthy Rich)	Released: Dec 2012; Label: Beach Boi Music; Format: Digital
2013	"If" (ft. J. Stalin, Nio tha Gift, Nolan Rashawn)	Released: April 16, 2013; Label: Beach Boi; Format: Digital
2013	"Out the Mudd" (ft. Che Dnero & Paris Cimone)	Released: May 8, 2013; Label: Beach Boi; Format: Digital
2013	"Ride On It" (ft. Iamsu!, John Hart, Kool John, Rayven Justice)	Released: July 23, 2013; Label: Beach Boi, Rapbay, Urbanlife; Format: Digital, music video
2013	"Yike On It" (ft. Priceless Da Roc, Iamsu!, John Hart, Rossi, Rayven Justice)	Released: Sep 3, 2013; Label: Beach Boi, Rapbay, Urbanlife; Format: Digital
2013	"A Million Ways" (by DePaul and AM Dre ft. Sage the Gemini, Smoovie & Salty)	Released: Dec 3, 2013; Label: Beach Boi, Rapbay, Urbanlife; Format: Digital

=== Production credits ===
- 2012: "Tryna Get On" by J. Stalin off Memoirs of a Curb Server (Livewire, INgrooves)

=== Appearances ===
Incomplete list of songs featuring Armani Depaul
Year	Title	Primary artist(s)	Album	Notes
2012	"Hood Chick" (ft. Depaul)	Stevie Joe, Dj.Fresh	Stevie Joe - The Tonite Show	
2012	"Never Knew Her" (ft. Depaul)	Philthy Rich, Pooh Hefner	#NOBFE	
2012	"Fire Up" (ft. Depaul)	Stevie Joe	Red Eye Flight	
2012	tracks 5, 7, 16 (ft. Depaul)	Stevie Joe	21.0 Grams	
2012	"Up Early In da Mornin" (ft. Depaul)	Stevie Joe	Mafia	
2013	"Clap It Up" (ft. Sage the Gemini & DePaul)	Jay n Fresh	Single only	
2013	"Stick up" (ft. Depaul)	Nolan Rashawn	Single only	
2013	"Its Ok" (ft. Depaul)	Stevie Joe	Single only	

=== Music videos ===
Music videos featuring Armani Depaul
Yr	Video title	Role, notes
2007	"Cookies and Milk"	primary artist, director
2010	"1000 Bitches on My Dick"	primary artist
2010	"Wiggle" by Depaul	primary artist
2010	"Don't Miss Me" with AM Dre	primary artist
2010	"Neva Enuff"	primary artist
2010	"Rock the Boat"	primary artist
2010	"You Ain't Know" with Young	primary artist
2010	"All Day Long"	primary artist
2010	"Put it Down"	primary artist
2011	"Juice"	primary artist
2011	"Once More Chance"	primary artist
2012	"Lock It In" ft. J. Stalin, Laroo T.H.H.	primary artist
2012	"Dollar and A Dream"	primary artist
2013	"Theory of Sound"	primary artist
2013	"All About You"	primary artist
2013	"Can You Handle It" ft. D Spitta	primary artist
2014	"Ride On It"	primary artist
2014	"Bubble Up (Champaign)"	primary artist

== See also ==
- West Coast hip hop
