= Kafani =

American rapper

- Born: Amir Rashad; January 1, 1980 (age 46); Oakland, California
- Genres: Hip hop, west coast hip hop, hyphy
- Occupation: Rapper
- Years active: 2007 - present
- Labels: Ice King Music, Big Cat Records, Sumo Productions, Thizz Nation, E1 Music

Amir Rashad (born April 21, 1980), better known by his stage name Kafani, is an American rapper from the Funktown section of San Antonio, Oakland, California. He graduated from Oakland High School in 1998 where he played varsity baseball for the Wildcats. He is one half of the Oakland-based rap group Babyface Assassins. He is also signed to Thizz Nation, a subdivision of the late Mac Dre's label Thizz Entertainment.

== Legal issues & Controversies ==
In February 2008, he was arrested on weapons and drug charges following a high speed car chase.

On August 26, 2011, rumors were that Kafani started a feud with Lil B when he told the rapper in a YouTube video "When I come off house arrest I'm gonna embarrass your bitch ass." However Kafani denied this and police investigators never found evidence of foul play by either party.

In November 2011, the son of Kafani's cousin, a one-year-old boy named Hiram Lawrence, was fatally shot, the victim of a random shooting in West Oakland. Initial reports indicated a crowd was present at the filming of a music video for the Oakland-based rapper. Kafani said the crowd had gathered outside the liquor store to film a music video, but that he was not involved, nor present, during the filming.

On September 28, 2013, Kafani was shot several times in East Oakland after shooting a music video. He was permanently paralyzed from the waist down. On October 18, 2013, he spoke for the first time since the shooting, in which he said "Took 5 shots they say I might not walk again but I'm on God's team so I know I'm going to win.". Kafani has launched a crowdfunding campaign with a concert on Sept 12, 2014 to acquire an assistive robotic device to walk again

On September 13,2022, Kafani was sentenced to 7 years (87 months) in elaborate fraud involving mortgages and gold bars.

== Discography ==
=== Studio albums ===
- Money's My Motivation (2007) - #6 Top Heatseekers Pacific
- Movin' Mean (2009)
- Maserati Music (2010)
- Still Fast (2012)

=== EPs ===
- Cutie Pie, Pt. 2 - EP (2008)
- Need Ya Body - EP (2009)
- She Ready Now - EP (2011)
- Bay Area Boss - EP (2011)

=== Mixtapes ===
- Mr. Cranberry (2010)
- Lifestyles of the Rich & Famous (2011)
- De$tined to Rule (2013)

=== with Rayven Justice ===
- Both Side of the Tracks (2012)

== Singles ==
- "Fast (Like a NASCAR)" (featuring Keak da Sneak) #24 Bubbling Under R&B/Hip-Hop Songs
- "She Ready Now" #22 Bubbling Under R&B/Hip-Hop Songs

== Guest appearances ==
Year	Song	Artist(s)	Album
2008	"Cocky"	Philthy Rich, Peanut	Slap House, Vol. 4
2008	"East Oakland"	Yukmouth, Bart, The Delinquents, Dru Down, Tuffy the Goon, Richie Rich, Tajai, The Team, Beeda Weeda	Million Dollar Mouthpiece
2010	"Take a Shot (Live By Night)"	Laroo T.H.H., Raw Smooth	Live By Night
2010	"Da Town" (Remix)	Yukmouth, Richie Rich, Beeda Weeda, London, Agerman, Shady Nate, Lee Majors, G-Stack	Free at Last
2010	"Spontaneous"	Big Rich, Laroo T.H.H., P-Child	Built to Last
2011	"Packs on Deck"	Philthy Rich, Hi Rolla	Loyalty B4 Royalty 3: Just for the N****s
2011	"I'm Just Gettin' Money"	Philthy Rich	Loyalty B4 Royalty 3: Just for the N****s
2011	"Fresh on the Block"	J. Stalin, Young Doe	Diesel Therapy
2011	"They Mad That I'm Icy"	Messy Marv, Philthy Rich, Guce	Neighborhood Supastar Pt. 3
2011	"All In One Night"	Rodney G	Sex Drive
2012	"Touchdown Dance"	Prank, Smoovie Baby	MMXII
2012	"Who We Are"	Laroo T.H.H., Kali Kash	Take the Stage
2012	"Came to Party"	Jinxshame, Rayven Justice	Cosmonauts
2012	"Don't Trip"	Laroo T.H.H., Turf Talk, P Child	Block Ops
2012	"Yesterday"	Traxamillion, Clyde Carson, Laroo T.H.H., Yukmouth, Balance	My Radio
2012	"Balla"	Stevie Joe, Philthy Rich	The Tonite Show with Stevie Joe
2013	"Betta Chick" (Remix)	Nova Boy, Erk tha Jerk	The New Capitol
2014	"Gotta Get Mine"	Chop Black, Stevie Joe	Mercenary Mixtape Vol. 3
