= Memoirs of a Curb Server =

Studio album by J. Stalin
- Released: July 10, 2012
- Genre: Rap, West Coast Hip Hop
- Length: 1:07:37
- Label: Fontana/Town Thizzness
- Producer: AK47, Armani De Paul, Big K.R.I.T., Dirtwork Song, DJ Fresh, Don Don, J Wess, Jon Jon On Da Beat, Liq, The Mekanix, Mike "Em80" Dupree, Sneaky Mike, The Sound Shop, Taylor Michael, Trackademicks, Work Dirty

J. Stalin chronology
Prenuptial Agreement (2010)	Memoirs of a Curb Server (2012)

Memoirs of a Curb Server is the seventh studio album by American rapper J. Stalin, released on July 10, 2012 via Town Thizzness & Fontana. It peaked at #54 on the R&B/Hip-Hop Albums chart, #16 on the Heatseekers Albums chart, and at the top spot on the Top Heatseekers Pacific chart, making it J. Stalin's most successful album to date. It is also the most successful album for the INgrooves imprint.

The album features guest appearances from E-40, The Jacka, Mistah F.A.B., Richie Rich, Too Short, and Yukmouth, among others.

Music videos have been filmed for the songs "Lyrical Exercise" featuring L' Jay; "Who Are U?"; "Pigeon Coop" featuring Ya Boy, L' Jay, and Shady Nate; "Something New, Pt. 2" featuring Sneaky Mike; "Curb Servin'" featuring Mayback and 4Rax; "Money & Bitches"; and "Try'na Get On" featuring Armani de Paul and Philthy Rich.

== Track listing ==
#	Title	length
1	Lyrical Exercise 3 (featuring L' Jay)	4:17
2	Money In Ya Jeans	2:37
3	Corner Sto (featuring Lil' Blood)	3:56
4	More Shots	3:30
5	Coke Coke (featuring E-40 & Stressmatic)	4:18
6	Curb Servin' (featuring Mayback & 4Rax)	3:27
7	Come Out To Play (featuring Joe Blow & Smiggz)	3:30
8	Money and Bitches	3:38
9	The Molly Song	3:52
10	Mind on One Thing (featuring Mistah F.A.B., L' Jay & Ron Ron)	3:52
11	Pigeon Coop (featuring Ya Boy, L'Jay & Shady Nate)	4:21
12	She the Type (featuring Too Short)	4:10
13	Tryna Get On (featuring Armani De Paul & Philthy Rich)	3:39
14	Sober (featuring J. Valentine)	3:18
15	Sunset	2:38
16	The Music	4:12
17	Rookie of the Year (featuring Vellquan)	3:59
18	Something New Part 2 (featuring Sneaky Mike)	3:33
19	Who Are U (Extended version)	4:11
20	Cannabis Club (Remix) [featuring Berner, Young Doe, The Jacka, Stevie Joe, Onionz, Richie Rich & Yukmouth]	6:04
