= Kill zone (disambiguation) =

Kill zone is the primary target area for a military ambush.

Kill zone may also refer to:

- The blast radius for an explosive weapon such as a grenade or bomb
- The hollow bull's eye of a field target

== Film and television ==
- "Kill Zone" (CSI episode), an episode of the American television series CSI: Miami
- "The Kill Zone", an episode of the American television series The Unit
- Kill Zone (film), a 1993 film directed by Cirio H. Santiago
- Kill Zone, the U.S. title of the Hong Kong film SPL: Sha Po Lang
- "Kill Zone", a third-season episode of MacGyver

== Other uses ==
- Kill Zone, a novel by Jack Coughlin and Donald A. Davis
- Killzone (series), a series of first-person shooter video games
  - Killzone (video game), the first game in the series
- Kill Zone (album), a 2012 album by American rapper Philthy Rich

== See also ==
- The Killing Zone, a 1985 unauthorized James Bond novel
- Killing Zone, 1996 video game for PlayStation
