= Kill Zone (album) =

Studio album by Philthy Rich
- Released: June 26, 2012
- Genre: Rap
- Length: 78:15
- Label: Town Thizzness / INgrooves
- Producers: AK-47, Brilliant, D Dosia, DJ Fresh, Mekanix, Taylor Michael, Mistah Slap, Mr. Tower, Drumma P, Parlay, Reecebeats, Fetty Slaps, Sound Shop, Stagmotta, Traxamillion, Bed Rock

Philthy Rich chronology
| Loyalty B4 Royalty Vol. 3 (2011) | Kill Zone (2012) | Izm 101 (2012) |

Kill Zone is the eighth album by rapper Philthy Rich released on June 26, 2012. It peaked at #40 on the Top Heatseekers Albums chart, making it his first album to chart on the Heatseekers.

Music videos have been filmed for the songs "Light It Up", "Kill Zone", "They Ain't Authentic", "True Religion Shawty", "I'll Find a Way (Dedicated to Dre Freddi)", "My Mex B***h", "3 B****es at the Same Time", "Thinking of You", "Renegade Alert", "I'm Just Pimp'n"., "A Seminary N***a" and "All I Have" featuring Sam.

An album for the leaked tracks that were originally going to be on ''Kill Zone'', ''Kill Zone: The Leak'', was released on March 28, 2012. It features guest appearances from Bobby V, Waka Flocka Flame, Berner and Kafani, among others.

== Track listing ==
| No. | Title | Producer(s) | Length |
|---|---|---|---|
| 1. | "The Truth" | AK47 | 3:23 |
| 2. | "To Whom It May Concern (Letter to the Bay)" | AK47 | 4:40 |
| 3. | "All I Have" (featuring Sam) | Bed Rock | 3:37 |
| 4. | "They Ain't Authentic" | AK47 | 4:02 |
| 5. | "Kill Zone" | D Dosia | 4:00 |
| 6. | "A Seminary Nigga" | The Mekanix | 3:43 |
| 7. | "Project Livin’" | Brilliant | 2:55 |
| 8. | "My Mex Bitch" | Parlay | 4:53 |
| 9. | "Money to Be Made" | Traxamillion | 3:08 |
| 10. | "True Religion Shawty" | Drumma P | 3:42 |
| 11. | "Light It Up" | Taylor Michael | 2:46 |
| 12. | "I’m Just Pimp’n" | The Mekanix | 3:08 |
| 13. | "Renegade Alert" | DJ Fresh, Mistah Slap | 4:27 |
| 14. | "#Teamphilthy" (featuring 4rAx) | The Mekanix | 4:27 |
| 15. | "Insecure" (featuring Rayven Justice) | Stagmotta | 3:02 |
| 16. | "3 Bitches at the Same Time" | AK47 | 5:11 |
| 17. | "Thinking of You" | Fetty Slaps | 4:29 |
| 18. | "Fallen Soldiers" (featuring Davina) | The Sound Shop | 4:32 |
| 19. | "I’ll Find a Way (Dedicated to Dre Freddi)" | Reecebeats | 3:52 |
| 20. | "Dead Beat" | Mr. Tower | 5:24 |

== Chart positions ==
| Chart (2012) | Peak |
|---|---|
| US Billboard Top Heatseekers Albums | 40 |
