= Da Bidness 2 =

Studio album by The Boy Boy Young Mess, Keak da Sneak & PSD
- Released: January 11, 2011
- Genre: Hip hop
- Length: 54:26
- Labels: Fatt City Incorporated; SMC

The Boy Boy Young Mess, Keak da Sneak & PSD chronology
| The Shooting Range (2011) | Da Bidness 2 (2011) | Neighborhood Supastar 3 (2011) |

Da Bidness 2 is a collaboration album by American rappers The Boy Boy Young Mess, Keak da Sneak & PSD, released in January 2011 via Fatt City Incorporated & SMC Recordings. The sequel to their 2007 album Da Bidness, it features guest appearances from Jagged Edge, Baby Bash & E-40, among others. It charted on the Heatseekers Pacific chart.

== Track listing ==
| No. | Title | Length |
|---|---|---|
| 1. | "Out of Time" | 3:35 |
| 2. | "Ghetto Love" (featuring Big Rich) | 4:24 |
| 3. | "Pole Princess" | 3:14 |
| 4. | "Bruh Bruh" | 3:26 |
| 5. | "Caboose" (featuring Husalah & Vital) | 4:11 |
| 6. | "My Niggas" | 3:50 |
| 7. | "K.I.M. (Keep it Movin')" (featuring Jagged Edge) | 3:51 |
| 8. | "Treal" (featuring E-40 & Nio The Gift) | 4:33 |
| 9. | "Ignorant [Skit]" | 1:38 |
| 10. | "Ignorant" (featuring Dem Hoodstarz) | 3:39 |
| 11. | "Bidness Man Crush" (featuring Samim) | 3:48 |
| 12. | "Get You Some" (featuring Clyde Carson) | 2:48 |
| 13. | "1Comin' Thru" (featuring Baby Bash) | 4:15 |
| 14. | "My Ride" | 3:09 |
| 15. | "Forever" (featuring Vital) | 4:05 |
