= Stevie Joe =

American rapper

- Born: Steve Joel Moffett Jr. Oakland, California
- Genres: Hip hop, west coast hip hop, hyphy
- Occupation: Rapper
- Years active: 2007 - present
- Labels: SMC Recordings, Town Thizzness, Thizz Nation, Livewire Records

Steve Joel Moffett Jr., better known by his stage name Stevie Joe or Thuggy Fresh, is an American rapper from Oakland. He is a member of the group Livewire and is signed to Town Thizzness and Thizz Nation, both subdivisions of the late Mac Dre's Thizz Entertainment. He has been featured on many Bay Area hip hop albums, most notably E-40's 2011 album Revenue Retrievin': Graveyard Shift, on a song called "Don't Try This at Home", with frequent collaborator Philthy Rich, also from Oakland. He also appears in the soundtrack to the 2008 film Ghostride the Whip.

== Discography ==
=== Studio albums ===
- Thuggy Fresh (2008)
- 7.0 Grams (2010)
- 14.0 Grams (2010)
- 80's Baby (2010)
- The Leak (2010)
- Thuggy Fresh: The Street Album (Part 2) (2010)
- 21.0 Grams (2011)
- Thizz Nation (Volume 28) (2011)
- LoveWire (2012)
- Thuggy Fresh (Part 3) (2012)
- LoveWire 2 (2013)
- 420 (2014)
- The Leak 2 (2014)
- LoveWire 3 (2014)
- LoveWire 4 (2015)
- 420 (The Album) (2015)
- Thuggy Life (2016)
- LoveWire 5 (2016)
- Block Statue 3 (2016)
- The Leak 3 (2017)
- Convertible Dreams (2017)
- Thuggyman (2018)
- Hurry Up & Buy (2018)
- Thuggy Life 2 (2019)
- Black Cloud (2020)
- CoolAde (2021)
- Block Statue 4 (2022)
- Tired Of Being Slept On (2024)

=== EPs ===
- Gold Mind (2013)
- 420 (2014)
- 710 (2014)
- Gold Mind 2 (2014)
- Gold Mind 3 (2015)
- Fuck Da Rap Game (2019)
- Hell 2 Pay (2024)
- Armani Dis Shit Thuggy Boy (with Armani DePaul) (2024)

=== Compilations ===
- Town Bizz All Stars 2 (The Sequel) (2009)
- Who Got Next? (2012)
- The Best Of Stevie Joe (2012)
- The Best Of Stevie Joe (Volume 2) (2014)

=== Mixtapes ===
- Block Statue (2007)
- Block Statue (Part 2) (2008)
- Coke (2009)
- Oxycontin (OC-80) (2009)
- Swag It & Bag It (2009)
- Quit Hatin’ On The Bay: Thuggy Fresh Edition (Starring Stevie Joe) (2010)
- Big Bucks & Styrofoam Cups (2011)
- Shop Open (2011)
- Ass N' Kusher (2012)
- Red Eye Flight (2012)

=== with Livewire ===
- The Empire (2009)
- Livewire Radio (2009)
- Livewire Radio 2 (2009)
- Livewire Radio 3 (2010)
- I Pledge Allegiance To The Wire (2011)
- Mafia (2012)
- I Pledge Allegiance To The Wire 2 (2012)
- Livewire Radio 4 (The Blood That Drips From Stalin’s Pen) (2014)
- The Saga Continues (2015)

=== Collaborations ===
- Philthy Fresh (with Philthy Rich) (2008)
- The Tonite Show With Stevie Joe (with DJ.Fresh) (2012)
- Live On The Wire (with The Mekanix) (2013)
- Philthy Fresh 2 (with Philthy Rich) (2014)
- 420 (Slowed & Chopped) (with DJ 51) (2014)
- Philthy Fresh 2 (Deluxe Edition) (with Philthy Rich) (2014)
- Pounds & Pryex (with Anonymous That Dude) (2014)
- Not Your Average Joe (with Willie Joe) (2016)
- Extracurricular Activities (with Mozzy) (2016)
- Philthy Fresh 3 (with Philthy Rich) (2017)
- After Hours (with Remy R.E.D.) (2018)
- Power Moves (with Al B Street) (2018)
- The Dopeboy Chronicles (with Justo) (2024)

== Guest appearances ==
Year	Song	Artist(s)	Album
2007	"1000$ Fit"	Kaz Kyzah	The Grofessional 2
2008	"Lil Weed Lil Xtc"	J. Stalin, Kaz Kyzah	Gas Nation
2008	"Block Show"	J-Diggs Geezy, Bavgate	Ghostride the Whip OST
2008	"She Choose'n"	Philthy Rich, DJ Fresh, Eddi Projex, Nephew	My Block: Welcome to Sem City
2009	"Here We Go Again"	Philthy Rich, A.G. Cubano	Free Philthy Rich
2009	"Talk"	Philthy Rich	Free Philthy Rich
2009	"Top Hat"	Philthy Rich, Lil Rue	Free Philthy Rich
2009	"Still Ain't Learnin'"	J. Stalin, Hawk Man	Livewire Radio 2
2009	"Cause I Had To"	Philthy Rich	Livewire Radio 2
2009	"Gettin' It"	G-Stack, Allen J, Curicinado, Eddie P, the Heem Team, Yung Stack	Dr. Purp Thumb
2009	"Reppin' My Name"	Livin' Proof, Beeda Weeda, Philthy Rich, Moses	Slap House Thizz Mix - EP
2009	"Betty Crocker"	Philthy Rich, J. Stalin	Slap House Thizz Mix - EP
2009	"Follow the Money"	Philthy Rich, Kaz Kyzah	Town Bizz All Stars
2009	"Dope"	Kaz Kyzah, Clyde Carson	Town Bizz All Stars
2009	"Must've Been a Hit"	Philthy Rich, Jamoine	Town Bizz All Stars
2009	"N****s Like Me"	Philthy Rich	Town Bizz All Stars
2009	"Blowin' Money"	Philthy Rich, Kaz Kyzah	Town Bizz All Stars
2009	"Hustla"	Philthy Rich, Acktup	Town Bizz All Stars
2009	"Bass Rock"	Philthy Rich	Funk Or Die
2009	"On Paper Work"	Philthy Rich, Yukmouth, Chop Black	Funk Or Die
2009	"Got the Line"	Philthy Rich, Bueno	Funk Season
2009	"Teeth 2 Feet"	Philthy Rich, Keak da Sneak	Funk Season
2009	"U Know What It Is"	Philthy Rich, J. Stalin	Funk Season
2009	"Straight from Oakland"	Philthy Rich, Ros, J. Stalin, Kaz Kyzah, Shady Nate, Lil Blood, Eddi Projex, Beeda Weeda, Keak da Sneak, Mistah F.A.B., Too Short	Quit Hatin' On the Bay
2009	"Started Out Hustlin'"	Philthy Rich, Husalah	Quit Hatin' On the Bay
2009	"Where I'm From"	Kilo Curt, Scoot of Dem Hoodstarz, D-Lo, Sleepy D, The Jacka, Young Naz, Guce, Yowda, Vital	1000 Grams
2009	"How You Feel"	Kilo Curt, Messy Marv, Eddi Projex, The Jacka	1000 Grams
2009	"Push'n Straight Cream"	Philthy Rich, Eddi Porjex	Funk or Die - The Leak
2009	"My Turn"	Philthy Rich, Shady Nate	Funk or Die - The Leak
2009	"Who Else"	Philthy Rich	Loyalty B4 Royalty
2009	"Murda4hire, Pt. 2"	Philthy Rich, J. Stalin, Shady Nate	Loyalty B4 Royalty
2009	"Face Down Up"	Philthy Rich, Miz Dre	Loyalty B4 Royalty
2009	"More Than Music"	Philthy Rich, Berner	Loyalty B4 Royalty
2009	"Neighborhood Supastar"	Philthy Rich, Lil Blood	Neighborhood Supastar, Pt. 1
2009	"Extortion Music"	Philthy Rich, Lil Blood, Lil Rue, Shady Nate, HD, Jay Jonah, J. Stalin, Mayback	Neighborhood Supastar, Pt. 1
2009	"House on the Hill"	Philthy Rich, Mistah F.A.B., Jarmoine	Neighborhood Supastar, Pt. 1
2009	"Ain't Nobody Funkin' Wit Me"	Philthy Rich, Lil Rue	Flyest N***a on 2 Feet
2009	"Hunnid Round Drums"	Guce, J. Stalin	Giants & Elephants
2009	"Hustle"	Philthy Rich, Lil Blood	Trip'N 4 Life: The Leak
2009	"Doe N***a"	Philthy Rich	Trip'N 4 Life: The Leak
2009	"Like I Do"	Philthy Rich, Freddie B, Lil Rue	Trip'N 4 Life: The Leak
2010	"Money Don't Stop"	Shady Nate, Mistah F.A.B.	The Shady Bunch, Vol. 2
2010	"Chillin'"	Shady Nate, Turf Talk	The Do-Fessional
2010	"All My Life"	Philthy Rich	Funk Season 2
2010	"Wrong"	Philthy Rich, Lil Blood, Shawnny Boo	Funk Season 2
2010	"Look'n 4 Me"	Philthy Rich	Funk Season 2
2010	"I Represent It' (Livewrie Remix)	Philthy Rich, Lil Blood, J. Stalin	Funk Season 2
2010	"When the Club Over"	J. Stalin	Prenuptial Agreement
2010	"This Is How I Ride"	Alias Alias, Moki	Untold Story
2010	"Until I'm Ballin'"	Guce, Matt Blaque	A Gangsta & a Gentleman
2010	"I'm Ill"	Shady Nate, Krypto	The Shady Bunch, Vol. 3
2010	"Local N***a"	Philthy Rich, Mayback	Early Morning Shift, Vol. 3
2010	"Dope Game Gravy"	Philthy Rich, Jay Jonah	Early Morning Shift, Vol. 3
2010	"California Soul"	Philthy Rich, San Quinn	Early Morning Shift, Vol. 3
2010	"Hubba Rocks"	Yukmouth, Philthy Rich & Lee Majors	Free at Last
2010	"Teknology"	Prince Lefty, Beeda Weeda	The Active Tape
2010	"I Put It Down"	Philthy Rich, J. Stalin, Freddie B	Loyalty B4 Royalty, Vol. 2
2010	"Ready 2 Ride"	Philthy Rich, D-Lo, Dolla Bill	Loyalty B4 Royalty, Vol. 2
2010	"Bang'n"	Philthy Rich, Lil Blood	Loyalty B4 Royalty, Vol. 2
2010	"I Need You"	J. Stalin, Lil Kev	Women & Money
2010	"On The Wire"	Philthy Rich, Lil' Blood, Mayback, Ronald Mack, Shady Nate	Neighborhood Supastar, Vol. 2
2010	"We Ain't Playin' Ova Here"	Shad Gee, Killa Keise	Snowing In Summer
2010	"True Hustla"	Philthy Rich, MoeJoe	Streets on Lock - EP
2010	"Look at Me Now"	V-White, The Politician, Kaz Kyzah	Streets Can Vouch
2010	"We Ain't Playn No Games"	Philthy Rich, Shad Gee	My Block: Welcome To Sem City 2
2010	"Dead Presidents"	J. Stalin	The Real World, Vol. 3
2011	"So Much Pain"	Philthy Rich, Rydah J. Klyde, Matt Blaque, 2Pac	Trip'n 4 Life
2011	"Run It"	Lockdown	Marlon Amedee - One Man
2011	"Don't Try This at Home"	E-40, Philthy Rich	Revenue Retrievin': Graveyard Shift
2011	"So Much"	Berner, Philthy Rich, Ampichino	The White Album
2011	"Live from the Ghetto"	Lil Blood	Funk Season 3
2011	"Money, Cars & H**s"	Hawk Man, Philthy Rich	Funk Season 3
2011	"In the Hood"	Smigg Dirtee, Hollow Up	Cocaine Cowboys
2011	"Beast Mode"	Philthy Rich, Husalah	Goon Vitamins, Vol. 1
2011	"Out the Way"	Philthy Rich, Messy Marv, Magnolia Chop	Neighborhood Supastar 3
2011	"Hustling Nonstop"	Al Husky, Ruffian, AllyBo, Lee Majors	Al Husky
2011	"Can I"	V-White, The Politician, J. Stalin, Philthy Rich	The Gas Station
2011	"Thuggy Fresh"	Dem Hoodstarz	HoodStarz Radio
2011	"Imma Love You"	Yung Lott, J. Stalin	Cupcakes & Cartier
2011	"Turn The Lights Off"	Philthy Rich, Balance	Loyalty B4 Royalty 3: Just for the Snitches
2011	"Right"	Philthy Rich	Loyalty B4 Royalty 3: Just for the N****s
2011	"How Can I Get Rich"	Cousin Fik, Beeda Weeda	No Gravity
2011	"Definition of a Blockstar"	Young Skeam	The Definition of a Blockstar
2011	"Mob"	Killa Keise, The Jacka	I'm Wit tha S***, Vol. 1
2011	"Don't Trust Nobody"	Killa Keise, Nipsey Hussle	I'm Wit tha S***, Vol. 1
2011	"Shop Open"	Haji Agent 8, Mayback, Deltrice	Unrestricted: Free Agent, Vol. 2
2011	"Pass the Racks"	Shoboat, Young Doe, Judge da Boss, Bueno, Dem Hoodstarz	Hunid Racks
2011	"What Could I Do"	J. Stalin	I'm Selling Dope
2011	"2Nite" (Remix)	Philthy Rich, J. Stalin, Fleetwood Low	Hood Rich 3
2012	"Married to the Money"	Philthy Rich, Dem Hoodstarz, Boo Banga, J Gouda	The Conspiracy
2012	"They Watchin'"	Philthy Rich, Dem Hoodstarz, Stone	The Conspiracy
2012	"Say What U Was Sayin'"	Joe Blow, Dubb 20	Real Recognize Real
2012	"They Need That Mob S**t"	The Jacka, Cellski	The Verdict
2012	"Da Bomb"	Sav Da Money Maker, Kaz Kyzah	800% Turfboy
2012	"Mandatory"	Jay Pound, Philthy Rich	Not Jus a Photographer
2012	"Miss My Lil Cuddy"	Philthy Rich, Dubb 20, Joe Blow	True Religion Shawty
2012	"Live Long"	AC, Yung Swoolah	Redrum
2012	"Plug Me In"	Shady Nate, 4rAx	The Droessional
2012	"Get High, Get Money"	Lil Raider, Young Loc	Ghetto Graduate 2
2012	"I Vow to Keep It Real"	Lil Raider, Berner	Ghetto Graduate 2
2012	"What You Smoken On"	Justo, Aftah Sum	S.O.B.: Son of a Biker
2012	"Blue Dream"	Blanco, Nipsey Hussle	Raw
2012	"Where U From"	Yukmouth, Dru Down, Rah Mean, Clyde Carson, Philthy Rich	Half Baked
2012	"24"	Danked Out, Philthy Rich	Reloaded
2012	"Play It H* I Plan It"	Livewire, Shady Nate, Jay Jonah	Mafia
2012	"Up Early In da Mornin"	Livewire, Armani DePaul	Mafia
2012	"Need a Lifeguard"	Philthy Rich, Lil Rue	Kill Zone: The Leak
2012	"Fab 5"	Philthy Rich, J. Stalin, Lil Blood, Shady Nate	Kill Zone: The Leak
2012	"King Size" (Remix)	Philthy Rich, Lil Goofy, Bobby V	Kill Zone: The Leak
2012	"Million Dolla Spot"	Shigady da Playboy, K-Loc of Gorilla Pitz, Remy Red of Thizz Dragons	Babby Backwoodz & Bo
2012	"Top Shottas"	Messy Marv, Philthy Rich	Cake & Ice Cream, Vol. 3
2012	"It's Pimpin'"	Pooh Hefner, Philthy Rich, Lil' Hyfe	#NOBFE
2012	"Gas"	Big Lou, Lilo	Stack or Starve
2012	"Message Thru a Telegram"	Dr. Zues, Young Cazzy, Lil Raider, J-Slappz	The Red Carpet treatment
2012	"Go Get It"	J. Stalin	The Body Snatchers
2012	"Whoppers"	Blaco, Yukmouth, The Jacka	Cookies 'n Cream
2012	"Cannabis Club" (Remix)	J. Stalin, The Jacka, Berner, Yukmouth, Richie Rich, Young Doe & Onionz	Memoirs of a Curb Server
2012	"He Never Seen It Coming"	Chris Lockett, Philthy Rich	11-5900
2012	"N da Mix"	Slaughter, Young Gully	Warning Before Destruction (The Wake Up)
2012	"The Flyest"	Pablo Fetti, Eddi Projex, Ali Shaye	The Big Payback
2012	"High Maintenance"	Work Dirty, Beeda Weeda	C.A.S.H. (Cash Allows Power & Opportunity)
2012	"Hustle Is Strong"	JenRO	Street Light
2012	"Cakes"	Macs-a-Million, Philthy Rich	Money Hungry (Hunger Pains)
2012	"Tuffer Den"	Macs-a-Million	Money Hungry (Hunger Pains)
2012	"Ride for You"	The Jacka, Lady Ile	The Tonite Show with The Jacka
2012	"Looking for Us"	Bueno, Dubb 20	Maloof Money, Vol. 3 (Executive Decisions)
2013	"Go Getta"	San Quinn, Seasessy, Bueno	DJ Loot Presents: Cali Fire, Pt. 3 of 4
2013	"Up the Block"	Lee Majors	G Slaps Radio Vol 4: Turkey Bags In My Louis Duffle
2013	"Turnt Up"	Young Tweez, Air Marley	Same N*gga, Different Age
2013	"Stay In Your Lane"	San Quinn, Extreme Hwd	Red Cups & Poker Chips
2013	"Pray for Me"	Lil Tae	New Age Order
2013	"Time to Move On"	Point 5, Purp Reynolds	Running Out of Options
2013	"All I Know"	Hongry, Nio da Gift	Cutthoat Republic
2013	"Never Been the Same"	Philthy Rich, J. Stalin	N.E.R.N.L. 2
2013	"Now They Don't Know Me"	Philthy Rich, Hell Rell	N.E.R.N.L. 2
2013	"Ain't Solid"	Philthy Rich	#teamPhilthy
2013	"Dirty Game"	FA, Big Scoob, Young Fate	What's Understood Don't Gotta Be Explained
2013	"One Day"	Joe Blow, Sleez	Check a Real N***a Out Tho
2013	"N***a Like Me"	Guce, Philthy Rich	Bullys Wit Fullys
2013	"Unfaithful"	C.A.P.O Click	C.A.P.O. Click
2013	"Cookie N Syrup"	6Hunnid BJ, Hennsippa	Cold Way of Livin;, Vol. 1: Free James
2013	"Street Levels"	Flyboy Stewie, Kr Mack	Back to the Muzik
2014	"Walk In My Shoes"	Stu Husalah, Lil Juu	Lillie Street Is the Street
2014	"Cold Sweat"	Overdose	Kkilill Switch
2014	"Syrup Attitude"	Philthy Rich, Yowda, Shad Gee	SemCity MoneyMan
2014	"Overqualified"	Petey Mac, AR 15	The West Kept Secret
2014	"Survival of the Fittest"	Chingaso'fresh, Laced	The Main Event
2021	"Still Grindin"	Remy R.E.D	Rewind
