= Bosses Will Be Bosses =

Studio album by The Delinquents
- Released: September 7, 1999
- Genre: West Coast hip hop, gangsta rap
- Length: 73:56
- Label: Dank or Die
- Producer: The Delinquents (exec.), Dot., Happy Perez, J-Cutt, Mike D, One Drop Scott, Twelve

The Delinquents chronology
Big Moves (1997)	Bosses Will Be Bosses (1999)	The Audio Biography: Vol. 1 (2001)

Singles from Bosses Will Be Bosses
- 1. "Halloween" Released: 1999; 2. "That Man" Released: 1999

Bosses Will Be Bosses is the second studio album by American hip hop group The Delinquents, released September 7, 1999 on Dank or Die Records. It was produced by The Delinquents, Dot., Happy Perez, J-Cutt, Mike D, One Drop Scott and Twelve, and executive produced by G-Stack and V-Dal. The album was voted as one of the top forty best independent albums of 1999 in a Murder Dog magazine poll. It features guest performances by Too Short, Richie Rich, Otis & Shug, Mack 10, Yukmouth, Money-B, 3X Krazy, B-Legit and Brotha Lynch Hung.

Along with a single, a music video was released for the song, "That Man" featuring Bart and Harm.

== Track listing ==
1. "Delinquents Are Back" (featuring Too Short) – 3:58
2. "That Man" (featuring Bart & Harm) – 3:07
3. "Renegades" (featuring J-Dubb & Agerman) – 4:13
4. "Haters" (featuring Richie Rich, Otis & Shug) – 4:37
5. "Senorita" (featuring Mack 10 & Yukmouth) – 4:37
6. "Last Chance" (featuring DT of The Dominion) – 3:46
7. "Talk'n Dirty" (featuring Money-B, Dot, J Cutt & 3rd Rail Vic) – 4:45
8. "Doing It Live" (featuring Master P) – 4:30
9. "Thinking Bout Home" (featuring Askari X) – 3:53
10. "I'm A Delinquent" (featuring Father Dom) – 3:38
11. "Our House (Dank or Die)" (featuring Chris Locket) – 3:45
12. "Everybody" (featuring The Whoridas, Rhythm & Green & Keak Da Sneak) – 4:00
13. "Bitch Niggas" (featuring B-Legit & Richie Rich) – 5:03
14. "Armageddon" (featuring C-Loc & Young Bleed) – 4:47
15. "Halloween" (featuring Brotha Lynch Hung) – 4:21
16. "No Fun" (featuring Will of Tony! Toni! Toné!) – 4:04
17. "Smile Now, Cry Later" – 3:20
18. "You Me & He" (featuring Otis & Shug) – 4:27
