= Big Moves =

Studio album by The Delinquents
- Released: May 20, 1997
- Recorded: 1996–1997
- Genre: West Coast hip hop, hardcore hip hop, g-funk, gangsta rap
- Length: 59:42
- Label: Priority
- Producer: Ali Malek, Chucksta, Filthy Rich, G-Stack (exec.), Mike D, One Drop Scott, Sonny B, Terry T, Vidal Prevost (exec.), Young B

The Delinquents chronology
Outta Control (1995)	Big Moves (1997)	Bosses Will Be Bosses (1999)

Singles from Big Moves
- 1. "Smooth Getaway" Released: 1997

Professional ratings
Review scores
Source	Rating
AllMusic	3/5 stars

Big Moves is the major label debut studio album by American hip hop group The Delinquents, released May 20, 1997 on Priority Records. The Delinquents have two members: G-Stack and V-Dal. The album was produced by Ali Malek, Chucksta, Filthy Rich, Mike D, One Drop Scott, Sonny B, Terry T and Young B, and executive produced by G-Stack and V-Dal. The album peaked at number 43 on the Billboard Top Heatseekers and at number 84 on the Billboard Top R&B/Hip-Hop Albums. It features guest performances by Agerman and Bart of 3X Krazy, as well as Gangsta P, The Dominion, Dolla Will, and Rame Royal (of Rhythm & Green). Dolla Will would later join Ant Banks' supergroup T.W.D.Y. on the album, Lead the Way.

Along with a single, a music video was released for the song, "Smooth Getaway" featuring Bart.

== Track listing ==
1. "Playa's Intro" – 2:14
2. "Puttin' It Down" (featuring DT, Gangsta P & D.E.L.) – 4:56
3. "We Bring tha Drama" – 4:00
4. "Cola Crunch" – 0:31
5. "Watch" – 4:14
6. "Take Me Higher" – 4:14
7. "True" (featuring DT & A.N.S. of The Dominion) – 2:45
8. "Fuck What Ya Heard" (featuring Agerman, Mike D & Y.G.T.O.) – 3:52
9. "Will Rap For Food" (featuring Rame Royal & Prodigy of The Dominion) – 3:27
10. "East Oakland West Coast" – 4:14
11. "My Bitch" – 0:20
12. "Sounds Like?" (featuring A.N.S. of The Dominion) – 4:00
13. "Conversation" – 4:08
14. "Yo Lay He Do" – 4:13
15. "Smooth Getaway" (featuring Bart) – 4:20
16. "Big Licks" (featuring Harm) – 4:32
17. "Let Me Touch It" (featuring Dolla Will) – 3:41
18. "Outro" – 0:31

== Chart history ==
Chart (1997)	Peak position
U.S. Billboard Top Heatseekers	43
U.S. Billboard Top R&B/Hip-Hop Albums	84

== Personnel ==
- Sonny B - Producer
- Mike D - Producer, Performer, Mixing
- The Delinquents - Mixing
- DT - Performer
- Filthy Rich - Producer
- Brian Gardner - Mastering
- Glenn Jones - Executive Producer
- Keba Konte - Photography
- Ali Malek - Producer
- Adam Muñoz - Mixing
- One Drop Scott - Producer, Mixing
- Vidal Prevost - Executive Producer
- Prodigy - Performer
- Chuck Sta - Producer
- Terry T. - Producer
- Dolla Will - Performer
