= SMC Recordings =

San Francisco based independent hip-hop record label

- Parent company: Universal Music Group
- Founded: 2005
- Founder: Charles Vasquez, Micheal Luna, Saroj Thapa
- Distributor: Fontana Distribution
- Genre: Hip-hop
- Country of origin: United States
- Location: Del Valle, Texas
- Official website: smcrecordings.com

SMC Recordings is an independent hip-hop record label established in 2005 in Del Valle, Texas, by Charles Vasquez, Micheal Luna, and Saroj Thapa. SMC primarily signs and distributes established hip-hop artists.

SMC grew out of a vision that Saroj Thapa had in the early 2000s to launch a new kind of record label, one based in his hometown, that would be about hip-hop music. Saroj crossed paths with Micheal Luna and Charles Vasquez, and SMC came one step closer to being realized. An ambitious Bay Area-bred music fan and aficionado, Bronson was covering East Texas's colorful hip-hop scene for a fledgling urban music magazine called Showcase at the time. Saroj hired him as his partner and in the A&R position. His instincts were right—the first release brought in and shepherded by Bronson was Ya Boy's first cousins, Bay Area hip-hop artists San Quinn and Messy Marv. At one point, Bizzy Bone of Bone Thugs-N-Harmony was signed to SMC.

The recruitment of Tashjian's fellow industry icon George Nauful to steer the company's business affairs and financial sectors completed the foundation.

George Nauful and Will Bronson are no longer owners, officers, or employees of SMC Recordings.

== Artists ==
- Kokane
- Messy Marv
- B-Legit
- San Quinn
- Mistah F.A.B.
- Ron Artest
- JT the Bigga Figga
- Pastor Troy
- J Stalin
- Killer Mike
- Green City (Scarfaces Group)
- Bizzy Bone
- Berner
- Capone-N-Noreaga
- Capone
- Noreaga
  - Capone-N-Noreaga
- Rappin' 4-Tay
- Big L (posthumously)
- Roscoe
- Stevie Joe
- PSD
- The Pack (group)
- The Jacka
- Husalah
- Philthy Rich
- Mill The Rapper
- Dem Hoodstarz
- G-Stack
- V-White
- Savage
- Get Low Playaz
- Rakim
- Paul Wall
- Bullys Wit Fullys
- Eddi Projex
- Psycho Realm
- Murs
- Smigg Dirtee
- Koshir

== Discography ==
=== 2005 ===
- Bizzy Bone - Speaking In Tongues
- B-Legit - Block Movement
- Ya Boy - Rookie of The Year
- Guce - Controversial

=== 2006 ===
- Pastor Troy - Stay Tru
- Dido Brown - Tales of A Young Brown Male
- Mac Minister - The Minister of Defense
- Kokane - Back 2 tha Clap
- Lil' Al - Hood Raised
- Deep Fried Funk Brothers - Out of The Frying Pan Into The Fire
- Bullys Wit Fullys - The Infrastructure
- San Quinn - The Rock: Pressure Makes Diamonds
- Messy Marv - Draped Up and Chipped Out
- Eldorado Red - East Side Rydah
- Balance - Young and Restless
- Lil' J - Back Like I Left Something
- Roscoe - I Luv Cali

=== 2007 ===
- Pastor Troy - Tool Muziq
- Turf Talk - West Coast Vaccine: The Cure
- PSD, Keak Da Sneak & Messy Marv - Da Bidness
- Messy Marv - Muzik 4 Da Taliban
- V-White - Perfect Timin
- Rappin' 4-Tay - That's What You Thought
- Mistah F.A.B. - Da Baydestrian
- B-Legit - Throwblock Muzic
- Messy Marv - Draped Up & Chipped Out, Vol. 2

=== 2008 ===
- Killer Mike - I Pledge Allegiance to the Grind II
- Scarface Presents Green City - Brand New Money
- San Quinn - From a Boy to a Man
- Messy Marv - Draped Up and Chipped Out, Vol. 3
- J. Stalin - Gas Nation
- Beeda Weeda - Da Thizzness

=== 2009 ===
- Pastor Troy - Feel Me or Kill Me
- Capone-N-Noreaga - 'Channel 10
- Killer Mike - Underground Atlanta
- The Jacka - Tear Gas
- Messy Marv & Berner - Blow
- Lil Atlanta -Itz Me
- Philthy Rich - Funk Or Die
- G-Stack - Dr. Purp Thumb
- Haji Springer - Hurry Up and Buy
- N.O.R.E. - S.O.R.E.
- Capone - Revenge Is A Promise
- Rakim - The Seventh Seal
- Eddie Projex - I Got The Streets On Fire
- Balance & Big Rich - Good As Money

=== 2010 ===
- The Pack - Wolfpack Party
- Messy Marv - Thizz City
- Murs & 9th Wonder - Fornever
- J. Stalin - Prenuptial Agreement
- Sleepy D - Sleepy Deprivation
- Messy Marv & Berner - Blow: Blocks & Boat Docks
- Stevie Joe - 80's Baby
- Koshir - White Girl Diaries

=== 2011 ===
- Messy Marv, Keak Da Sneak & PSD - Da Bidness 2
- Philthy Rich & Messy Marv - Neighborhood Supastar 3
- U.S.D.A. - The Afterparty
- Killer Mike - PL3DGE
