= Giants & Elephants =

Studio album by Guce & J. Stalin
- Released: July 21, 2009
- Genre: Rap
- Length: 1:08:23
- Label: Livewire Records/Git Paid Music Group
- Producer: DJ Daryl, Sean T

Guce & J. Stalin chronology
I Got That Cake Mix! (2009)	Giants & Elephants (2009)	The Duffle Bag Boys (2009)

Giants & Elephants is a collaboration album by American rappers Guce & J. Stalin, released on 21 July 2009. It peaked at #61 on the R&B/Hip-Hop Albums chart. Giants & Elephants is Guce's most successful album to date, and his first appearance on that chart since 1994's Peer Pressure. It features a guest appearance from Currensy.

Music videos has been filmed for "Another Quelo" featuring Shady Nate and "Use a Chick" featuring Killa Keise (who was shot and killed 2 1/2 years after the album's release), Shady Nate, Philthy Rich, Beeda Weeda and Young Jun3.

== Track listing ==
No.	Title	Length
1.	"Get Off My" (featuring T-Nutty)	4:48
2.	"Murder Mans On" (featuring Killa Keise)	4:08
3.	"M.O.B." (featuring Balance & Lady Unique)	4:27
4.	"Baserock N***a" (featuring Killa Keise)	3:48
5.	"Use A B****" (featuring Killa Keise, Shady Nate, Philthy Rich, Beeda Weeda & Young Jun3)	3:41
6.	"Another Quelo" (featuring Shady Nate)	4:25
7.	"Don't Knock My Hustle" (featuring Killa Keise)	3:46
8.	"Where Da Gangstas Stay"	3:45
9.	"Concrete Jungle" (featuring Mayback)	4:57
10.	"Til My Casket Drop" (featuring Mitchy Slick & AG)	4:13
11.	"Get It Together" (featuring Aristotle & Young Jun3)	4:42
12.	"Dripped In A Hunid Thousand"	4:01
13.	"I'm A D-Boy" (featuring Killa Keise & C-Dot)	4:10
14.	"Hunid Round Drums" (featuring Stevie Joe)	4:42
15.	"Gettin Racks" (featuring Killa Keise & Jet Black)	4:30
16.	"Dis Dat S***" (featuring Currensy)	4:20
Total length:		1:08:23

=== Notes ===
- There is a 17th track entitled "What's Next", but is not included on the CD version of the album.
