= DJ Fresh (American DJ) =

American DJ and hip hop producer

DJ.Fresh
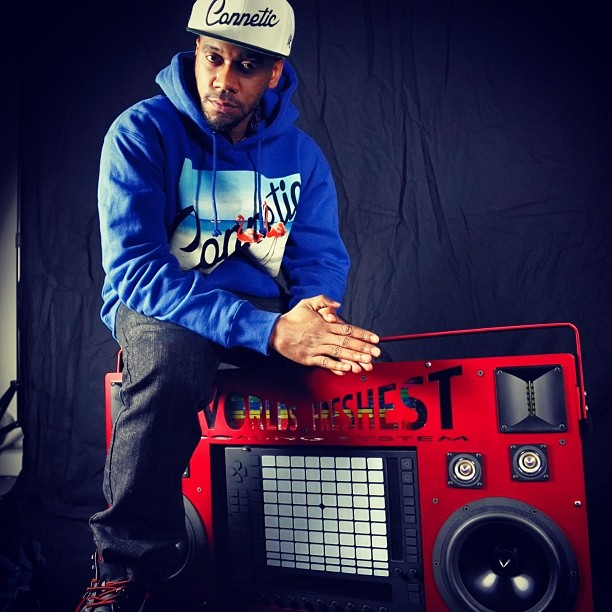

Background information
- Also known as: The World's Freshest
- Born: Marqus Brown; November 2, 1981 (age 45); Baltimore, Maryland, U.S.
- Origin: Oakland/Los Angeles, California, U.S.
- Genres: R&B; hip hop; soul
- Occupations: Music producer, DJ
- Instruments: Digital audio workstation; turntables
- Years active: Late 1990s – present
- Labels: Fresh in the Flesh; Livewire
- Website: www.djfreshthetoniteshow.com

Marqus Brown (born November 2, 1981), better known by his stage name DJ Fresh (now stylised as DJ.Fresh), is an American hip hop DJ and producer based in Oakland and Los Angeles, California. Acclaim for his work includes being named to XXL magazine's 30 Best Hip-Hop Producers of 2016. In 2005, DJ.Fresh began releasing his The Tonite Show series of mixtapes, which have featured artists such as Mistah F.A.B., Raekwon, The Jacka, Yukmouth, Freddie Gibbs, Paul Wall, Jay Worthy, Mitchy Slick, Eligh, The Grouch, Nef The Pharaoh, Zion I, Rydah J Klyde, Ya Boy, Mozzy, Messy Marv, San Quinn, Shady Nate, J Stalin, Laroo T.H.H., T-Nutty, Keak Da Sneak, Beeda Weeda, Money B, The Hoodstarz, Stevie Joe, and Curren$y. He has also released a number of mixtapes and has produced albums for other artists. His 2013 collaboration with J. Stalin, Miracle & Nightmare On 10th Street (Deluxe Edition), peaked at #61 on the R&B/Hip-Hop Albums chart and at #28 on the Heatseekers Albums chart.

== Early life ==
Marqus Brown was born and raised in Baltimore, Maryland. While an adolescent in Baltimore he became immersed in hip hop culture, and he started mixing vinyl on turntables at age nine. Among his early musical influences were soul, hip hop, and jazz artists popular in the 1970s and 1980s, including Anita Baker, Whitney Houston, and the Gap Band.

He moved with his mother and siblings to the San Francisco Bay Area in California at nine years old. The crew battled and performed around the Bay Area.

== Music career ==
=== Early years ===
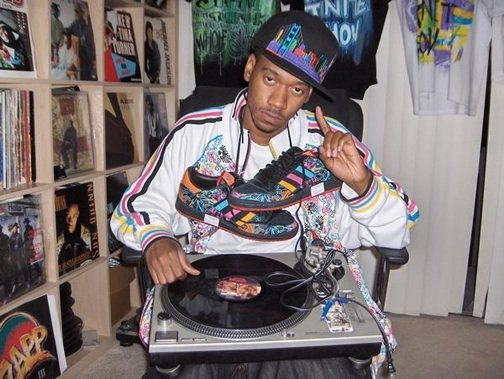
DJ.Fresh mixing live

DJ.Fresh's first major break was DJing at a show in San Francisco with Common at the age of 18, and shortly afterwards he Deejayed on two tours for the rapper Nas. He began producing his own music as well, creating beats with turntables and a digital audio workstation. In 1999 he was named the 3rd best DJ in the US by ITF (International Turntablist Federation).

While he initially mixed with the moniker DJ Fresh, he adopted the name The World's Freshest, and later stylised his name to DJ.Fresh to avoid confusion with DJ Fresh, the English producer of the same name.

=== The Tonite Show series ===
In 2005 DJ.Fresh started "The Tonite Show" album series, where he produces albums with guest artists that have since included Freddie Gibbs, The Jacka, The Grouch, J Stalin, Yukmouth, Mitchy Slick, E-40, and Raekwon.

His 2014 The Tonite Show release with Trae Tha Truth received a positive review from RapReviews.com, who stated the album "shows glimpses of a nice little partnership brewing".

=== Recent production ===
In 2006 DJ.Fresh began producing for a number of major artists, starting with the album The Real World West Oakland by J. Stalin. In the next two years he worked on albums by Shady Nate and Bicasso as well, and that later extended to artists such as Mitchy Slick. He won Best West Coast Producer in 2009–10. As of 2010 he ran the Whole Shabang production team, with producers such as Jamon Dru, Mr. Tower, Sneaky Mike, Face the Music, Mike Rimzo, Scandal Beats, & Young Gully.

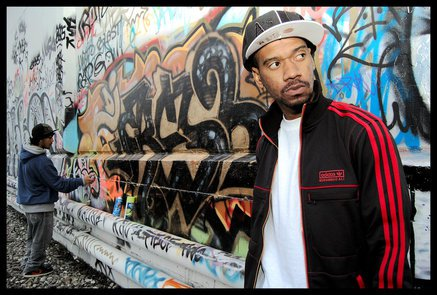
DJ.Fresh

Miracle & Nightmare On 10th Street (Deluxe Edition) is a double disc collaboration album between J. Stalin and DJ.Fresh, released on July 16, 2013. It peaked at #61 on the R&B/Hip-Hop Albums chart and at #28 on the Heatseekers Albums chart.

He also released the album Feet Match The Paint with Mitchy Slick in 2013, and in 2014 he released his Boomin' System Mixtape, which has guest artists such as Scarface and Kendrick Lamar. The mixtape was received positively, and a review by Complex praised the variety and unpredictability of the production styles.

== Style, equipment ==
DJ.Fresh incorporates a variety of styles in his production, including hip hop, EDM, house, jazz, and R&B, though he self-identifies as more of an R&B than a hip hop producer. He uses analog equipment including turntables and vinyl, and a MIDI controller keyboard. He also uses Ableton Live and occasionally brings in live instrumentation.

== Discography ==
Albums

- I’m Depressed (1995)
- MicroFresh Windows 2000 (1995)
- SuperCuts (Volume 1) (1997)
- The Centipede Style (1999)
- Searching For Mr. Greene (2001)
- The Real World West Oakland (with J Stalin) (2006)
- The Tonite Show With Smigg Dirtee (with Smigg Dirtee) (2006)
- The Tonite Show With Okair (with Okair) (2007)
- The Tonite Show With Mr. Tower (with Mr. Tower) (2007)
- The Tonite Show Compilation (Volume 1) (with Various Artists) (2007)
- The Worlds Freshest Hour Radio Show (with Various Artists) (2007)
- The Tonite Show With J Stalin & Beeda Weeda (with J Stalin & Beeda Weeda) (2007)
- The Tonite Show With Chris Da 5th (with Chris Da 5th) (2007)
- The Tonite Show With Obnoxious (with Obnoxious) (2007)
- The Tonite Show With DJ.Fresh (with Various Artists) (2007)
- The Tonite Show (Part 2): The Sequel With Smigg Dirtee (with Smigg Dirtee) (2007)
- Based On A True Story (with Shady Nate) (2007)
- The Tonite Show Maxi Singles (with Mistah F.A.B.) (2007)
- The Tonite Show (Part 2) With Okair (with Okair) (2007)
- The Tonite Show (Part 2) With DJ.Fresh (with Various Artists) (2007)
- Make The Song Cry (2008)
- The Tonite Show (Sweat Team Edition) With Lil Al Tha Gamer (with Lil Al Tha Gamer) (2008)
- Rebel Musiq EP (with Bicasso) (2008)
- The Tonite Show With Stash Magazine (with Various Artists) (2008)
- My Block: Welcome To Sem City (with Philthy Rich) (2008)
- Beat Battle (with Eligh) (2008)
- The Tonite Show With Shady Nate & Jay Jonah (Da Heavy Hittaz) (with Shady Nate & Jay Jonah) (2008)
- The Tonite Show With Messy Marv (with Messy Marv) (2009)
- U Already Kno Doe EP (with D-LO) (2009)
- All My 2008 Beats (Happy New Years Edition) (2009)
- The Tonite Show (Addressing The Beef) With San Quinn (with San Quinn) (2009)
- We Run Shit (with DJ Maniakal) (2009)
- The Tonite Show (The Album) with DJ.Fresh (with Various Artists) (2009)
- The Real World East-West Oakland (Part 2) (with J Stalin & Mayback) (2009)
- Make The Song Cry (Part 2) (2009)
- The Tonite Show With Money B (with Money B) (2009)
- Rebel Musiq (with Bicasso) (2009)
- The Tonite Show With Pegee (with Pegee) (2009)
- Young Lean (with Young Lean) (2009)
- The Tonite With Young Gully (with Young Gully) (2009)
- Kiss (with Jadakiss) (2009)
- The Tonite Show With D-LO (with D-LO) (2009)
- Three Eyes Off The Time (with The Grouch) (2009)
- The Tonite Show (Northern Cali Gon Wild): The Soundtrack With Young Til & G The Getaway Star (with Young Til & G The Getaway Star) (2010)
- The King Of Beats (2010)
- Hella Songs: The Definitive Collection (All Freestyles) (with Mr. Tower) (2010)
- The Tonite Show 2011 (with Various Artists) (2010)
- The Tonite Show With The Hoodstarz (with The Hoodstarz) (2010)
- The Tonite Show (Sleep Talking) With Sleepy D (with Sleepy D) (2010)
- Make The Song Cry (Part 3) (2010)
- The Real World West Oakland (Part 3) (with J Stalin) (2010)
- The Tonite Show (Thuggin' & Mobbin') With Yukmouth (with Yukmouth) (2010)
- My Block: Welcome To Sem City (Part 2) (with Philthy Rich) (2010)
- The Tonite Show (Sneakacydal Returns) With Keak Da Sneak (with Keak Da Sneak) (2011)
- Make The Song Cry (Part 4) (2011)
- The Tonite Show (Get Active) With Manigga (with Manigga) (2011)
- The Real World West Oakland (Part 3): Instrumentals (with J Stalin) (2010)
- DJ.Fresh Goes Christmas (with Various Artists) (2011)
- The Tonite Show (Part 2) With Mr. Tower (with Mr. Tower) (2011)
- 1st Impression (with Lady Ile) (2011)
- The Tonite Show With Lil Rue (with Lil Rue) (2011)
- David (with Young Gully) (2011)
- The Tonite Show (Lights, Camera, Action) With Deltrice (with Deltrice) (2011)
- Thizz Nation (with DJ.Fresh & The Whole ShaBang) (2011)
- The Tonite Show (Channel 24th Street) With T-Nutty (with T-Nutty) (2011)
- Still Based On A True Story (with Shady Nate) (2011)
- The Tonite Show (Definition Of A Blockstar) With Young Skeam (with Young Skeam) (2011)
- He’s Back (with D-LO) (2011)
- Fresh (The Album) (with HD Of Bearfaced) (2011)
- Bass Rock Babies (The Leak) (with Beeda Weeda) (2011)
- The Tonite Show (Sneakacydal Returns Instrumentals) With Keak Da Sneak (with Keak Da Sneak) (2011)
- 1st Impression (Instrumentals) (with Lady Ile) (2011)
- Til Music Do Me Part (with Young Lean) (2011)
- The Tonite Show With The Jacka (with The Jacka) (2012)
- George’s Freche Money (Best Of DJ.Fresh) (with Various Artists) (2012)
- He Still Think He Raw (with Casual) (2012)
- The Tonite Show With Cousin Fik (with Cousin Fik) (2012)
- The Tonite Show With Roy Ayer’s (2012)
- Make The Song Cry (Part 5) (2012)
- The Tonite Show Sessions (with Various Artists) (2012)
- George’s Freche Money (DJ.Fresh Samples) (with Various Artists) (2012)
- The Tonite Show With Stevie Joe (with Stevie Joe) (2012)
- Miracle On 10th Street (with J Stalin) (2013)
- Nightmare On 10th Street (with J Stalin) (2013)
- The Morning Show With Bo Strangles (with Bo Strangles) (2013)
- The Tonite Show (Deluxe Edition) With The Jacka (with The Jacka) (2013)
- Super Cuts #1 (2013)
- The Tonite Show With Mozzy (with Mozzy) (2013)
- Make The Song Cry (Part 6) (2013)
- The Tonite Show Sessions (Volume 2) (with Various Artists) (2013)
- The Morning Show With Blast Holiday (with Blast Holiday) (2013)
- The Tonite Show With Raekwon (with Raekwon) (2013)
- Feet Match The Paint (with Mitchy Slick) (2013)
- Live From Jamaica (2013)
- Return Of The Mac (with Mac Mall) (2013)
- Miracle & Nightmare On 10th Street (Deluxe Edition) (with J Stalin) (2013)
- Feet Match The Paint (Deluxe Edition) (with Mitchy Slick) (2013)
- The Tonite Show With Trae Tha Truth (with Trae Tha Truth) (2014)
- The Morning Show With Young Liifez (with Young Liifez) (2014)
- Boomin’ System (2014)
- The Best Of The Tonite Show (with Various Artists) (2014)
- Lil Goofy (with Lil Goofy) (2014)
- The Morning Show With ST Spittin (with ST Spittin) (2014)
- 40 (2014)
- The Tonite Show With Freddie Gibbs (with Freddie Gibbs) (2014)
- The Defintion Of Mobbin’ (with Jay Jonah) (2014)
- The Tonite Show With Marley B & Cash Lansky (with Marley B & Cash Lansky) (2014)
- King Of The Interstate (with Shady Nate) (2014)
- The Real World West Oakland (Trilogy) (with J Stalin) (2014)
- An Instrumental Experience (with Matt Luty) (2014)
- The Morning Show With Armani DePaul (with Armani DePaul) (2014)
- Uppers & Downers (2015)
- Make The Song Cry (Part 7) (2015)
- The Tonite Show With Planet Asia (with Planet Asia) (2015)
- L.A. Sessions (with Mr. Tower) (2015)
- Overdue Feelings (with Lady Ile) (2015)
- The Berlin Sessions (2015)
- Therapy (8 Hour Session) (with Deltrice) (2015)
- Remy & Rose Style (2015)
- The Real World West Oakland (Part 4) (with J Stalin) (2015)
- Make The Song Cry (Part 8) (2015)
- The Tonite Show (Part 2): I Thrive On Negativity With Manigga (with Manigga) (2016)
- David 2 (Michelangelo) (with Young Gully) (2016)
- The Tonite Show With Celly Ru (with Celly Ru) (2016)
- The Tonite Show (The Interrogation Room) With Sonny Black (with Sonny Black) (2016)
- Music Is Life Is Music (with Woon) (2016)
- The Tonite Show (Part 3): Live From 45 With Mistah F.A.B. (with Mistah F.A.B.) (2016)
- Make The Song Cry (Part 9) (2016)
- The Tonite Show With Laroo aka Hitta Slim (with Laroo Tha Hitta, aka Hitta Slim) (2016)
- The Tonite Show With Ezale (with Ezale) (2016)
- The Tonite Show (Yang Edition) With Chippass (with Chippass) (2017)
- Conversations With The Devil (with Lil Blood) (2017)
- The Tonite Show With Ya Boy aka Rich Rocka (with Ya Boy, aka Rich Rocka) (2017)
- Make The Song Cry (Part 10) (2017)
- The Tonite Show With Rydah J Klyde (with Rydah J Klyde) (2017)
- The Tonite Show With J Stalin (with J Stalin) (2017)
- The Tonite Show (Mackin’ Classes) With Mickey Vegas (with Mickey Vegas) (2017)
- The Tonite Show (Instrumentals) With Rydah J Klyde (with Rydah J Klyde) (2017)
- Make The Song Cry (Part 11) (2018)
- The Tonite Show (Seattle Edition) With Da Boy Eternal (with Da Boy Eternal) (2018)
- Miracle & Nightmare On 10th Street (Part 2) (with J Stalin) (2018)
- The Tonite Show With Zion I (with Zion I) (2018)
- Fresh 2 (The Enlightenment) (with HD Of Bearfaced) (2018)
- The Tonite Show With Jay Worthy & Mitchy Slick (with Jay Worthy & Mitchy Slick) (2018)
- Pueblo Esco (with Rydah J Klyde) (2018)
- The Tonite Show With The Grouch (with The Grouch) (2018)
- The Fresh Prince Of The Bay (with Lil 100 Rack$) (2018)
- The Tonite Show (Seattle Edition) With Kae One (with Kae One) (2018)
- Year 2006 (with Mistah F.A.B. & Traxamillion) (2018)
- DJ.Fresh Goes Nintendo (2018)
- Make The Song Cry (Part 12) (2018)
- The Tonite Show With Swelly (with Swelly) (2019)
- The Sounds Of DJ.Fresh (2019)
- Late Night Freeway Vibez (2019)
- The Tonite Show With Rich The Factor (with Rich The Factor) (2019)
- One Night In Maui (2019)
- Summertime Vibes (with Money Makin S-Dot) (2019)
- DJ.Fresh Goes Ambient (2019)
- A Vibe Called Fresh (2019)
- A Product Of The 80’s (Part 2) (with Young Doe) (2019)
- Make The Song Cry (Part 13) (2019)
- Fresh Fonk (with Vilifye) (2019)
- Late Night Freeway Vibez (Volume 2) (2019)
- The Tonite Show With Curren$y (with Curren$y) (2020)
- The Virus Vibes (2020)
- The India Vibes (2020)
- The Real World West Oakland (Part 5) (with J Stalin) (2020)
- Fresh Idea (The M.O.B. Vibes) (with DJ Idea) (2020)
- Babyface Vs Teddy Riley (2020)
- The Fonk Vibes (with XL Middleton) (2020)
- The Hood House Vibes (2020)
- The Lush & Luxurious Vibes (with Kev Choice) (2020)
- Late Night Freeway Vibez (Volume 3) (2020)
- The Father Daughter Vibes (with DJ Chaz) (2020)
- Love & Rockets (Volume 2): The Declaration (with Murs) (2020)
- The Laser Disc Vibes (2020)
- The Vocoder Vibes (2020)
- The Tonite Show (Deluxe Edition) With Curren$y (with Curren$y) (2020)
- The Real World West Oakland (Part 5): Instrumentals (with J Stalin) (2020)
- Late Night Freeway Vibez (Volume 4) (2021)
- Chords & Keys (with Julian Avila) (2021)
- The Tonite Show With Nef The Pharaoh (with Nef The Pharaoh) (2021)
- Chaka Khan Vs Stephanie Mills (2021)
- Make The Song Cry (Part 14) (2021)
- Cardboard Robots (with Five) (2021)
- The Tonite Show (Instrumentals) With J Stalin (with J Stalin) (2022)
- The Tonite Show (Instrumentals) With Ezale (with Ezale) (2022)
- The Tonite Show (Instrumentals) With Messy Marv (with Messy Marv) (2022)
- Cardboard Robots 2 (with Five) (2022)
- The Tonite Show (Instrumentals) With Jay Worthy & Mitchy Slick (with Jay Worthy & Mitchy Slick) (2022)
- Love & Rockets (Volume 2): The Declaration (Deluxe Edition) (with Murs) (2022)
- The Real World West Oakland (Part 6) (with J Stalin) (2022)
- The Tonite Show With Eligh (with Eligh) (2022)
- Late Night Freeway Vibez (Volume 5) (with Sledgren & RMB Justize) (2022)
- The Tonite Show (Deluxe Edition) With Nef The Pharaoh (with Nef The Pharaoh) (2022)
- The Remix Vibes (2022)
- Cardboard Robots 3 (with Five) (2022)
- Smoke, Hoes, & Low Lows (with Elquan) (2022)
- 48 Hrs (with Foley Beats) (2022)
- The Real World West Oakland (Part 6): Instrumentals (with J Stalin) (2022)
- The Tonite Show (Instrumentals) With Eligh (with Eligh) (2022)
- A Lesson To Be Learned (Refreshed) (with RBL Posse) (2023)
- Make The Song Cry (Part 15) (with BananaFanaPho) (2023)
- The Tonite Show Compilation (Part 2) (with Various Artists) (2023)
- The Lush & Luxurious Vibes (Volume 2) (with Kev Choice) (2023)
- The Earbugs Sound Vibes (with CJL) (2023)
- Refreshed (2023)
- Refreshed (R&B Edition) (2023)
- The Forever Tape (2023)
- The Radio Jingle Vibes (2023)
- Too Fly 2 Die (with Dinero Sinatra) (2023)
- The Tonite Show Compilation (Part 2): Deluxe Edition (with Various Artists) (2024)
- Make The Song Cry (Part 16): The Finale (2024)
- The Tonite Show (Part 2): The Sequel With Curren$y (with Curren$y) (2024)
- The Encore (with Curren$y) (2024)
- The Tonite Show (Part 2) With Jay Worthy (with Jay Worthy) (2024)
- The Cinematic Vibes (2024)
- Late Night Freeway Vibez (Volume 6) (2025)
- The Tonite Show (Trilogy) With Curren$y (with Curren$y) (2025)
- The Gospel Vibes (2025)
- Live & Let Fly (with The Musalini) (2025)
- The Tonite Show With Paul Wall (with Paul Wall) (2025)
- The Movie Soundtrack Vibes (2025)
- The Sounds Of DJ.Fresh Sessions (Volume 2) (2025)
- The VCR Vibes (2025)
- DJ.Fresh Goes Snoop Dogg (Refreshed) (2025)
- DJ.Fresh Goes Messy Marv & Flyte Time (Refreshed) (2025)
- DJ.Fresh Goes Luther (Refreshed) (2025)
- DJ.Fresh Goes A Tribe Called Quest (Refreshed) (2025)
- DJ.Fresh Goes Take 6 (Refreshed) (2025)
- DJ.Fresh Goes Zapp & Roger (Refreshed) (2025)
- DJ.Fresh Goes Whodini (Refreshed) (2025)
- DJ.Fresh Goes George Duke (Refreshed) (2025)
- DJ.Fresh Goes The S.O.S. Band (In The Mix) (2025)
- DJ.Fresh Goes Freddie Jackson (Refreshed) (2025)
- DJ.Fresh Goes Roy Ayer’s (Refreshed) (2025)
- DJ.Fresh Goes Earth, Wind, & Fire (In The Mix) (2025)
- DJ.Fresh Goes Marvin Gaye (Refreshed) (2025)
- DJ.Fresh Goes PAC & Biggie (Refreshed) (2025)
- The Tonite Show (The Worlds Freshest P) With Fendi P (with Fendi P, aka Corner Boy P) (2025)
- The Tonite Show (Chopped Not Slopped Remix) With Paul Wall (with Paul Wall & OG Ron C) (2025)
- Freshstrumentals #1 (2026)
- Moons In Paris (2026)
- Life & Times Of BabyFaceCuh (with Deja Carter) (2026)

Mixtapes

- The Tonite Show With Mistah F.A.B. (with Mistah F.A.B.) (2005)
- The Bay Beats Mixtape # 5 (Hosted By Mistah F.A.B.) (with Mistah F.A.B.) (2005)
- Bay Bizzness Mixtape #2 (with DJ Cali) (2006)
- The Price Is Right Mixtape (with Mr. Tower)(2006)
- The Tonite Show (Part 2): The Sequel With Mistah F.A.B. (with Mistah F.A.B.) (2008)
- Boomin' System Mixtape (with Various Artists) (2014)
  Singles
- Romance 1200’s - New Moon (2002)
- We Go Stupid In The Bay (For Mac Dre) - Mistah F.A.B. (2005)
- Y’all Ain’t Gangsta - Sonny Black (2005)
- I Go By The Name Of G.S. - G-Smooth (2005)
- We On - Pretty Black (featuring Mistah F.A.B. & Dru Down) (2006)
- Bustin’ O’s - J Stalin (2008)
- Round The Hood - Mistah F.A.B. (2008)
- Sip Sumthin’ (Original Version) - Shady Nate (featuring Jay Jonah & Lil Blood) (2008)
- Cocaine Cowboys - J Stalin (2008)
- Down My Road - J Stalin (2008)
- Stressed Out - Lil Blood (2008)
- Can’t Judge Me - J Stalin (featuring G-Stack of The Deliquents) (2008)
- Satisfied - Philthy Rich (featuring Beeda Weeda & Lil Kev) (2008)
- Wit’ The Felons - Livewire (2008)
- Ten Street - Livewire (2008)
- Uh Huh - Livewire (2008)
- I Remember - Livewire (2008)
- Paint The Town - J Stalin (2008)
- Better Way - Shady Nate (featuring Philthy Rich & Kiwi Da Beast) (2009)
- The Follow Through - Afro Classics (featuring Anderson Paak) (2009)
- Xhale & Smoke Dissapears - Sunspot Jonz (2009)
- A.S.A.P. - Lil Blood (2009)
- Army Guns - Ronald Mack (featuring Shady Nate, Lil Monie, & Ant Mack) (2009)
- Head Doctor - Shady Nate (2009)
- Bottom Of The Bottle - Shady Nate (featuring Jay Jonah) (2009)
- Sip Sumthin’ - Shady Nate (featuring Jay Jonah & Lil Blood) (2009)
- Sell My Coke - Lil Blood (featuring J Stalin) (2009)
- No Hoe (Town Remix) - D-LO (featuring Keak Da Sneak & Mistah F.A.B.) (2009)
- Ridin’ Dirty - Livewire (2009)
- Ipod - Livewire (2009)
- Pimpin’ - Livewire (2009)
- Countin’ This Money - J Stalin (2009)
- Paint The Town (Remix) - J Stalin (featuring Philthy Rich, Shady Nate, Jay Jonah, Beeda Weeda, Krypto, & Lil Al Tha Gamer) (2009)
- No Hoe (Bay 2 LA Remix) - D-LO (featuring Snoop Dogg & Daz Dillinger) (2010)
- Eyes Wide Shut - Elijah The Poet (2010)
- Red October - Elijah The Poet (2010)
- M.O.B. - Young Gully (featuring D-LO) (2010)
- Clean Ass Car - J Stalin & Young Doe (featuring Midas) (2010)
- On The Wire - Philthy Rich (featuring Shady Nate, Ronald Mack, Lil Blood, Stevie Joe, & Mayback) (2010)
- I Know I Ain’t Perfect - J Stalin (2010)
- One Reason - J Stalin & Lil Kev (2010)
- Golden Legacy - Elijah The Poet (featuring Bicasso & 21 Stylez) (2010)
- Bang Bang - Yukmouth (2010)
- Project Nigga - Philthy Rich (featuring Messy Marv & Mitchy Slick) (2011)
- Liters - HD Of Bearfaced (featuring The Bearfaced Gang) (2011)
- Hit My Line - HD Of Bearfaced (featuring 600BJ & Lil Joe) (2011)
- Gimme Da Nite - HD Of Bearfaced (featuring The Bearfaced Gang) (2011)
- Ju’ Like N*ggas - HD Of Bearfaced (featuring The Bearfaced Gang) (2011)
- Hate - Young Gully (2011)
- Prove It - J Stalin (2011)
- Real N*gga Recipe - Shady Nate (featuring Jay Jonah) (2011)
- F*ck U - J Stalin (featuring Philthy Rich & Kiwi Da Beast) (2011)
- My Car - J Stalin & L’Jay (2012)
- Haters - J Stalin & L’Jay (featuring Mayback) (2012)
- Just My Swagger - J Stalin & L’Jay (2012)
- Who Are U? (Extended Version) - J Stalin (2012)
- Duplicate - HD Of Bearfaced (2012)
- Living In Hell - J Stalin (2012)
- Get Loose - E-40 (featuring Droop-E & Cousin Fik) (2012)
- I’m Laced - E-40 (featuring Cousin Fik) (2012)
- Come & Try - Ronald Mack (featuring KR Mack & Dot Com) (2012)
- Get Away - Elijah The Poet (featuring Bicasso & Dreezy) (2012)
- Dare To Be Different - Slaughter (2012)
- Fresh Air - Fashawn (featuring Thom Stockton) (2012)
- Get It Boyz - Uzzy Marcus (featuring Relly Rel & Lil Dallas) (2012)
- Thizzler Cypher - Kool John & Smoovie Baby (2012)
- Boomin’ System - The Jacka (featuring Lady Ile & Bo Strangles) (2012)
- Destination Unknown (DJ.Fresh Remix) - Eligh (featuring The Grouch & Zion I) (2012)
- Play To Win - Berner (featuring Ampichino & Freeze) (2013)
- Start A Convo - HD Of Bearfaced (2013)
- World Is Crazy - L.I.Q. (featuring Philthy Rich & Lil Rue) (2013)
- F*ck U (Part 2) - J Stalin (2013)
- Some N*ggas - Young Gully (2013)
- Heaven & Hell (Remix) - Young Gully (featuring Wes Nyle) (2013)
- Thankful - Prince Lefty (2013)
- We Don’t (DJ.Fresh Remix) - Zion I (featuring Eligh & The Grouch) (2013)
- Excuse Me - The Jacka & DubbleOO (2013)
- My Block Roll - Lil Blood (2013)
- The Truth (Uncut Version) - Smigg Dirtee (featuring T-Nutty & Dubb 20) (2013)
- My Mistake - King Bam Bubbi (2013)
- Boomin’ System (Remix) - The Jacka (featuring J Stalin, Fashawn, Keak Da Sneak, & Lady Ile) (2014)
- What’s Up Love - California Cheese (2014)
- Work - Sleepy D (featuring Hongry) (2014)
- For The Worlds Freshest Aka DJ.Fresh - ST Spittin (2014)
- #STFU (Turf Version) - DJ.Fresh (2014)
- #STFU (Dance Version) - DJ.Fresh (2014)
- Path To Paradise - Armani DePaul (2014)
- 100 In My Chop - The Jacka (featuring Carey Stacks & Lil Monie) (2014)
- Bass Rock Babies - Beeda Weeda (2014)
- Animal - Beeda Weeda (featuring Stevie Joe & Shady Nate) (2014)
- 3000 Eighty’s Babies - DJ.Fresh (2014)
- Y.K.W.L. - Mitchy Slick & Oso Ocean (featuring Sean Deez, Shotts, 2Die4, & Woodgrane) (2014)
- Hammer Time - J Stalin (featuring Retro) (2014)
- Summertime - Young Gully (2014)
- Til The Death Of Me - Footz The Beast (featuring J Stalin) (2014)
- Top Grade - Dubb 20 (featuring Retro & L.I.Q.) (2014)
- 4P’s - Espy M.O.S.S. & Tas (2014)
- I Miss My N*gga - Mitchy Slick (2015)
- We Run The Streetz - Livewire (2015)
- 6 Speed - Livewire (2015)
- Age - J Stalin (2015)
- The Cook Up - Young Meezy (featuring Guce & Bonez) (2015)
- Mobbin’ - Nef The Pharaoh (2015)
- Miss You - Droop-E (2015)
- Friends - HD Of Bearfaced (2015)
- Chicken Talk - HD Of Bearfaced (2015)
- Bye Felicia - J Stalin (featuring L’Jay) (2015)
- Instagram Gangstaz - J Stalin (featuring L’Jay) (2015)
- Maxwell - Lil B (2015)
- Heaven For A G - Lil B (2015)
- California - Fashawn (2016)
- Check’n In - Laroo Tha Hard Hitta aka Hitta Slim (2026)
- Flavor In Yo Ear - Lil Blood & June (2016)
- Money Up - Lil Blood & June (2016)
- Have You Ever - Feelmore Slim (featuring Ampichino) (2016)
- Playin’ Soccer - J Stalin (featuring L’Jay) (2016)
- C.O.D. - ST Spittin (featuring MonieBoy) (2016)
- Can’t Stop - Beeda Weeda (featuring J Stalin, Big Cydwaiz, & YM Da Kidd) (2016)
- Hey Lil White Girl - Mitchy Slick (2016)
- Top Hat - Cousin Fik (2016)
- Yes Indeed - Mistah F.A.B. (featuring Lupe Fiasco & Fashawn) (2016)
- Actavis - Shady Nate & Lil Blood (featuring HD Of Bearfaced) (2016)
- Piece A Sh*t B*tch - Jooney Mac (featuring Pyrex Pissy & Buddah) (2017)
- #TLC - Jooney Mac & Buddah (2017)
- How Many People - HD Of Bearfaced (2017)
- Off The Books - Khalygud (featuring Don Hilidae & Armani DePaul) (2017)
- Starter Coat Nike Cortez - Yukmouth (2017)
- 6AM - Yukmouth (2017)
- So Serious - Yukmouth (2017)
- Xmas & Thanksgiving - Murs (2017)
- Us - Zion I (2017)
- F*cking Around - Clientail (2017)
- Paper Boy - Laroo Tha Hard Hitta, aka Hitta Slim (2017)
- Thizzler Cypher - Chippass & ALLBLACK & Show Banga & Marty Grimes (2017)
- In Me, Not On Me - Payroll Giovanni & Cardo Got Wings (2018)
- Less Broke - Cousin Fik (2018)
- The Struggle - Chris Da 5th (2018)
- Slow - Lil B (2018)
- Somebody Close - Mitchy Slick (2018)
- Yang Style - Chippass (2018)
- H.O.E. - Vilifye (2018)
- Iceberg - ST Spittin (2018)
- Heaven Day Pass - Mistah F.A.B. (2018)
- The Defintion Of Gas (Part 2) - Young Gully (2018)
- Life (Part 3) - Young Gully (2018)
- The Sixth Letter - Fashawn (2018)
- Double Edged Sword - Hymlic Sizzle (featuring Equipto) (2018)
- Get To It - Leem Da Dreem (2018)
- Organic Watermelon Juice - Larry June (2018)
- About Me - Noni Blanco (2018)
- Swack For Bomb - Mitchy Slick (2018)
- Black Divinity - Mac Mall (2018)
- Show Out - Diviniti (2018)
- Get It Fresh - Sonny Daze (2018)
- No Hookin’ - Dubb 20 (2018)
- Pain On The Break - Eligh (featuring The Grouch) (2018)
- Organic Mud - Larry June & Cardo Got Wings (2019)
- Losing It - Swelly (featuring Equipto) (2019)
- Selfish - Benny (2019)
- Play The Game - Chippass (2019)
- Get Paid - Beeda Weeda (2019)
- No Aim - G-Loc (featuring Chippass & StayRichKash) (2019)
- South Vallejo - Nef The Pharaoh (2019)
- Tap Yo P*ssy - Nef The Pharaoh (2019)
- Left Me In The Mud - Nef The Pharaoh (featuring Sada Baby) (2019)
- Put Me On - J Stalin (2019)
- Where Do I Go Wrong - J Stalin (featuring Joeseph Kay) (2019)
- No Handouts - G-Loc (featuring Mike Sherm & MBNel) (2019)
- Presidential Smoke - Wiz Khalifa (2019)
- Knowledge & Wisdom - Wiz Khalifa (featuring Sosamann) (2019)
- G.O.A.T. Flow - Wiz Khalifa (featuring TheMXXNLIGHT & Cardo Got Wings) (2019)
- Bacc To Winning - Wiz Khalifa (featuring Ty Dolla $ign & Cardo Got Wings) (2019)
- You Don’t Have To Hide - Wiz Khalifa (featuring Young Deji) (2019)
- Real One - Wiz Khalifa (featuring Young Deji) (2019)
- Monitored Millions - Wiz Khalifa (2019)
- All For You - Wiz Khalifa (featuring TheMXXNLIGHT) (2019)
- From The Start - Wiz Khalifa & Curren$y (featuring Tommy Girl) (2019)
- First Or Last - Wiz Khalifa & Curren$y (2019)
- Bottle Poppers - Wiz Khalifa & Curren$y (2019)
- Thizzler Cypher - HD Of Bearfaced & Stevie Joe & 10Gotti (2019)
- Swervin’ - Lauryn (2019)
- Perfection - J Slick (2019)
- Suga Ain’t Free - DonnaCherry ThaChop (featuring Celly Cel) (2019)
- Green Juice In Dallas - Larry June & Cardo Got Wings (2020)
- Won’t Do - Keak Da Sneak & The Mekanix (2020)
- New Car Scent - AJ Snow (2020)
- Coogi Cique - AJ Snow (2020)
- On Deck - Everybody Eats (2020)
- Remind Me - J Stalin & Young Spudd (2020)
- All That - J Stalin & Young Spudd (2020)
- Who Cares - #TheAnti (2020)
- Badaboom - Benny (2020)
- Show Out - Kendro 420 (featuring Fashawn, Omar Aura, Vont Da Rasta, & Pillionaires Fly) (2020)
- VFV - Chippass (2020)
- That’s That - Beeda Weeda (2020)
- Call Katie - Jane Handcock (2020)
- Up Or Down - E-40 (featuring Wiz Khalifa) (2020)
- All My Children - ALLBLACK (2020)
- S.H.E. - ALLBLACK (2020)
- Sweet Tea - Five (2020)
- Let’s Ride - Extra Prolific (featuring Swelly) (2020)
- A Few Good Men - Extra Prolific (featuring Swelly & Equipto) (2020)
- Ballin’ Again - Hollow Tip (2020)
- Organic Work - Larry June (featuring Black C Of RBL Posse) (2020)
- Neighborhood Superstar - Curren$y (2020)
- Game - Southdawg (2020)
- On My Dresser - The Gatlin (featuring Yukmouth) (2020)
- Smiled On Me - Curren$y (2021)
- One Of Dem Nights - Droop-E (featuring Lady Ile) (2021)
- After Party - Rucci & AzChike (featuring Haiti Babii) (2021)
- I Need It - Da Boy Eternal (2021)
- Doin’ Me - Mac $ Kane (featuring Richie Rich) (2021)
- Hol Up - Anthony Danza (featuring Vilifye) (2021)
- Pump Dat Bass - Slim 400 (2021)
- I’m Petty - Big Tef (featuring Yukmouth & Matt Blaque) (2021)
- Closer 2 The Plug - Payroll Giovanni (featuring Mack Nickels & Cashout Calhoun) (2021)
- Top Of The World - Da’Ron (2021)
- F*ckin’ With It - AJ Snow (2021)
- Remain Solid - Lil Blood (2022)
- Drive This Car - Curren$y (2022)
- Don’t Check Me - Larry June (2022)
- Don’t Check Me (Remix) - Larry June (2022)
- Got It Right - Rucci (featuring Cheyenne Wright) (2022)
- Invest In Yo Self - Gohn John (featuring DJ Idea) (2022)
- Inspector Gadget - Scando The Darklord (featuring Mitchell) (2022)
- Creep - Deja Carter & Dru Banga (2022)
- Klondike Bar - L.O.S.I.N.I.T. (featuring Keak Da Sneak) (2022)
- Pop Out - DeJ Loaf (2022)
- Let Me Show You - OneDeep Outlaw (2022)
- All In Together - Dregs One (2022)
- Still Gettin’ It - Beeda Weeda & The Gatlin (2022)
- Light The Dope - The Hoodstarz (2022)
- Player Mode Activated - Haiti Babii (2022)
- 81 Shots - Keak Da Sneak (2023)
- Another Day - Ya Boy, aka Rich Rocka & Deedotwill (2023)
- Change It Up - CashhX & Prahfitz (2023)
- Make It Big - CashhX & Prahfitz (2023)
- Play The Field - Deja Carter (2023)
- 1st & 15th - G Style (featuring Curren$y & ALLBLACK) (2023)
- Don’t Confuse Me - J Stalin & Young Doe (featuring B.C.) (2023)
- Trap’n Outta Rental - Beeda Weeda (2023)
- All I Wanna Do - Jourdan Jade (2023)
- No Pole - Don Toliver & Cardo Got Wings (2023)
- Reconsider - Trae Tha Truth (2023)
- Get It Or Don’t Come Back - Trae Tha Truth (featuring Nico Of ABN) (2023)
- Last Thing I Do - J Stalin (featuring Anthony Danza) (2023)
- Anything Goes (Original Version) - Curren$y (featuring Jade) (2023)
- 3 Commas - Paul Wall (2023)
- Shout Out To My Grower - Paul Wall (2023)
- Can’t Stop The Hustle - Paul Wall (featuring Crys Wall) (2023)
- Another Day, Another Dollar - Paul Wall (2023)
- Alchemy Of Bankrolls - Paul Wall (2023)
- Young Boss - Kaylan Hardy (2023)
- T.V. Love - Mistah F.A.B. (2023)
- Late Night Mobbin’ - Allybo (featuring Killa Fonte & Dom Perryon) (2023)
- Go Like Green Lights - Little Larry (2023)
- Oh Well - Owl Green (2024)
- The Very Best - J Stalin & Lyjah (2024)
- Rob Base - J Stalin (2024)
- Party Started - D-LO (featuring Haiti Babii) (2024)
- O.M.W. To Malibu - Jelani The Babe (2024)
- Ben Himm - Stik Figa (2024)
- I’m It - Laroo Tha Hard Hitta, aka Hitta Slim (featuring E-40) (2024)
- Potent - Blizz Wellz (featuring Jae Millz) (2024)
- Been So Long - Yogi Calhoon (2024)
- Woke Up A Millionaire - Paul Wall (2024)
- All Money Good - Paul Wall (featuring Eddie Coke) (2024)
- Way 2 Wet - Paul Wall (2024)
- All Night - Paul Wall (2024)
- Underground Ambassador - Paul Wall (featuring Rich The Factor, Berner, Big K.R.I.T., & Termanology) (2024)
- Pocket Fulla Money - Paul Wall (2024)
- The Day I Got That 9 (Remix) - J Stalin & Young Doe & Anthony Danza (2024)
- A Fresh Start - New Carlier (2024)
- Top Of The City - Afterthought & DJ Say & Professor Gabel (2024)
- A World Tour - Afterthought & DJ Say & Professor Gabel (2024)
- Anything Goes (Remix #2) - Curren$y (featuring Jay Rock) (2024)
- What’s Hannin’ - Wiz Khalifa (2025)
- McLaughlin Ave - Deja Carter (featuring Mad Cleva) (2025)
- Planes & Birds - T. Spoon (featuring Pricy) (2025)
- Until We Meet Again (Twan Deez) - Dez Mac (featuring Mistah F.A.B.) (2025)
- Rushin’ In - Swelly (2025)
- Tonight - Young N & Deedotwill (2025)
- Sit Across - Payroll Giovanni (2025)
- Guidance - Dez Mac (featuring Young Roddy & Cudi P) (2025)
- From The Jump (Remix #2) - Jay Worthy (featuring Wiz Khalifa & OhGeesy) (2025)
- No Limp Mode - Zee Jets (2025)
- You Can’t See Us - Paul Wall (2026)
- 500K - Sir Michael Rocks (2026)
- On My Side - Taj-He-Spitz & Cousin Fik (2026)
- Slow - Paul Wall (featuring Sounds Like Den) (2026)
- MOB Throb - E-40 & Cousin Fik & Hitta Slim, aka Laroo Tha Hard Hitta (2026)
- Elbow Room - Paul Wall (2026)
- Fortune & Glory (Intro) - Paul Wall (2026)
- I Want It All - Paul Wall (2026)
- Top Tier - Paul Wall (2026)
- Something For Sale - Paul Wall (2026)
- HT In The TL - Paul Wall (2026)
- Love With A Smile - Paul Wall (2026)
- Only Me & You - Paul Wall (2026)
- Good News, Bad News - Paul Wall (featuring Ratchet Blues) (2026)
- The Hard Work Works - Paul Wall (featuring Crys Walls & Baby Doll Wall) (2026)
- Respect - Droop-E (2026)
- Play The Field - Deja Carter (2026)
- Organic Motion - Larry June (2026)
- Extra Parkin’ - Fendi P aka Corner Boy P (2026)
- Three-Peat - Paul Wall & Termanology (2026)
- Back In Paris - Paul Wall & Termanology (2026)
- Stars In The East - Joe Fresco (2026)
