= Shady Nate =

American rapper

- Born: Oakland, California
- Genres: Hip hop, west coast hip hop, hyphy, Gangsta rap
- Occupation: Rapper/Co-Founder of Livewire Records/CEO of Shady Nation
- Years active: 2006 - present
- Label: Livewire Records/Shady Nation

Shady Nate, is an American rapper from Oakland. He is co founder and original member of Livewire Records with rapper J Stalin. He is also founder and CEO of Shady Nation.

== Discography ==
Singles

- 2007: No Days Off (featuring Jay Jonah)
- 2008: Sip Sumthin’ (Original Version) (featuring Jay Jonah, Lil Blood, & DJ.Fresh)
- 2009: Head Doctor (featuring DJ.Fresh)
- 2009: Sip Sumthin’ (featuring Jay Jonah, Lil Blood, & DJ.Fresh)
- 2010: Flyin’ Wit’ My Iron (featuring HD Of Bearfaced & Dubb 20)
- 2011: Shady Nate & AK47 - Send It Overnight
- 2011: Banga On My Waist (featuring San Quinn & Mitchy Slick)
- 2011: Shady Nate & Jay Jonah - Heavy Hittaz (Freestyle)
- 2011: Dat’s What I Do (featuring Clyde Carson, Kaz Kyzah, & Moses Music)
- 2011: I’ma Boss (Freestyle)
- 2011: Shady Nate & DJ.Fresh - Real Nigga Recipe (featuring Jay Jonah)
- 2012: Plug Me In (featuring Stevie Joe & 4rax)
- 2012: Activist Nights
- 2012: Shady Nate & J Stalin & Kaz Kyzah & The Mekanix aka The Go Boyz - Get Set
- 2012: Shady Nate & J Stalin & Kaz Kyzah & The Mekanix aka The Go Boyz - This Is Where U Go (Remix)
- 2013: Hair Nappy
- 2013: Estella (Freestyle)
- 2013: 4 My Niggaz
- 2013: One Of Them Ones (featuring The Nation)
- 2014: Shady Nate & DJ.Fresh - Left Right Slide (featuring A Plus Tha Kid)
- 2014: Shady Nate & A Plus Tha Kid - Blue Chips
- 2014: Shady Nate & A Plus Tha Kid - Clouds Of Smoke
- 2015: Whip It
- 2015: Ride
- 2015: Crack (featuring Fe The Don)
- 2015: Flashback
- 2015: Don’t Talk To Me (featuring Maj Gutta, Jus, & Thrill)
- 2015: U Want This (featuring Maj Gutta & Fe Tha Don)
- 2015: Knock At The Door (featuring Fe Tha Don)
- 2015: Remember (featuring J Stalin)
- 2016: Still (featuring 3HMB)
- 2016: Airplane Mode
- 2016: Shady Nate & Fe Tha Don - Do It For A Real One
- 2016: Still Work (featuring Young Gully & Alley Boy)
- 2016: Strapped Wit’ Mac’s
- 2016: 100 Nights Hustlin’ (Remix) (featuring Mozzy & A Plus Tha Kid)
- 2016: Shake Haters & Do You
- 2016: Shady Nate & Joseph Kay - Change Your Lifestyle
- 2017: Shady Nate & Joseph Kay - Honor Roll (featuring Celly Ru)
- 2017: Chevy Run
- 2017: Find Out (featuring Thrill)
- 2017: Strapped Wit’ Mac’s (Remix) (featuring J Stalin, Beeda Weeda, HD Of Bearfaced, Bandaide Of The Hoodstarz, Mayback, & Lazy-Boy)
- 2017: High On Life
- 2018: Shady Nate & HD Of Bearfaced - Pull Up
- 2019: Kings & Kids (featuring Mistah F.A.B. & APB Lem)
- 2019: Ridah Love (featuring Loove Moore)
- 2019: Stay Humble
- 2020: High (featuring Bruce Banna)
- 2020: Champs
- 2020: Mobb Meetin’ (featuring Jay Jonah & Thrill)
- 2022: Won’t Tell (featuring HD Of Bearfaced)
- 2022: Snakes In The Grass
- 2022: Pyrex (featuring J Stalin & Lyjah)
- 2022: Bonnie & Clyde (featuring Monay Sha’reece)
- 2023: Shady Nate & The Whoadees - Tha Sky
- 2023: Free Gas
- 2023: Oil Spill (featuring HD Of Bearfaced & Mak Erv)
- 2024: Shady Nate & HD Of Bearfaced - Permanent Scars
- 2025: Price Of Loyalty (featuring Brody Loc)
- 2025: Run My Race (featuring Billion Dollar Bill)
- 2025: Shady Mission (featuring Baby Shady)
- 2026: Shady Anthem
- 2026: ShadyPac
- 2026: On One (featuring Keak Da Sneak & HD Of Bearfaced)

=== Albums & Mixtapes ===
- 2007: Thousand Shady Acres
- 2007: Shady Bunch
- 2007: Shady Nate & DJ.Fresh - Based On A True Story
- 2007: Shady Nate & J Stalin - The Early Morning Shift (Volume 2)
- 2008: Livewire Da Gang - Pay Ya Self Or Spray Ya Self (Shady Nate, J Stalin, Jay Jonah)
- 2008: The Graveyard Shift
- 2008: Shady Nate & Jay Jonah & DJ.Fresh - The Tonite Show With Shady Nate & Jay Jonah (Da Heavy Hittaz)
- 2009: Livewire - Livewire Radio
- 2009: Gasman Unleashed
- 2009: Livewire - The Empire
- 2009: Livewire - Livewire Radio (Volume 2)
- 2010: Shady Bunch (Volume 2)
- 2010: The Bo-Fessional
- 2010: Shady Bunch (Volume 3)
- 2010: Livewire - Livewire Radio (Volume 3)
- 2010: Mobb Marley
- 2010: Livewire - Southern Hospitality
- 2011: Son Of The Hood
- 2011: Shady Nate & DJ.Fresh - Still Based On A True Story
- 2011: Livewire - I Pledge Allegiance To The Wire
- 2012: Shady Nate & J Stalin & Kaz Kyzah & The Mekanix aka The Go Boyz - Get Set (EP)
- 2012: Shady Nate & J Stalin & Kaz Kyzah & The Mekanix aka The Go Boyz - Everything Must Go
- 2012: S.L.A.P. (Something Like A Pimp)
- 2012: Livewire - Mafia
- 2012: Livewire - I Pledge Allegiance To The Wire 2
- 2013: Nation Of Domination
- 2013: Mobb Marley (Part 2)
- 2013: Nation Of Domination (Part 2)
- 2013: Shady Nate & A Plus Tha Kid - Lean Team (EP)
- 2014: Shady Nate & DJ.Fresh - King Of The Interstate
- 2014: Shady Nate & Overdose - Money Talks
- 2010: Livewire - Livewire Radio (Volume 4): The Blood That Drips From Stalin's Pen
- 2015: Livewire - The Saga Continues
- 2015: The Remix Gon’ Hurt ‘Em
- 2015: The Bo-Fessional 2 (Still Sippin’)
- 2016: Shady Nate & Lil Blood - Bitches On Dope (Hosted By J Stalin)
- 2016: The Bo-Fessional (Volume 3)
- 2016: M.F.L. (Mobbin’ Fa Life)
- 2016: The Bo-Fessional (Volume 3): Deluxe Edition
- 2017: The S.H.A.D.Y. Project
- 2017: Livewire - Still Winning
- 2018: Shady Nate & Joseph Kay - G’s To Gents
- 2018: Return Of The Gasman (EP)
- 2018: Shady Nate & HD Of Bearfaced - Omertà (The Black Hand)
- 2020: The S.H.A.D.Y. Project (Volume 2)
- 2020: Shady Nate & Bruce Banna & Mazerati Ricky - Deaf, Dumb, & Blind
- 2023: Loyalty Breeds Royalty
- 2023: Shady Nate & Swurve - Respect Game (EP)
- 2025: Courtesy Of The Mobb
- 2025: The Lost Sessions
- 2026: Shady Nate & Joseph Kay - G’s To Gents (Part 2): Gangsters Edition
- 2026: Shady Nate & Joseph Kay - G’s To Gents (Part 3): Gentlemen’s Edition
- 2026: M.F.L. (Mobbin’ Fa Life): Part 2

== Guest appearances ==
Year	Song	Artist(s)	Album
2006	"Anything Goes"	Beeda Weeda, J. Stalin	Homework: The Mixtape
"80's Baby"		Beeda Weeda, J. Stalin	Homework: The Mixtape
2007	"Ghostride"	Kaz Kyzah, Beeda Weeda	The Grofessional 2
2007	"Footkill, Acorn, Lil Blood"	Chris da 5th, DJ Fresh, Lil Blood	The Tonie Show with Chris da 5th
2007	"100 Percent"	Chris da 5th, DJ Fresh, J. Stalin	The Tonie Show with Chris da 5th
2008	"I Say"	J. Stalin	Gas Nation
2008	"Block Music"	Stevie Joe, Willie Joe, Jay Jonah	Block Statue, Pt. 2
2008	"Trouble"	Mistah F.A.B.	Play Time Is Over
2009	"The Courtroom"	Mistah F.A.B., DJ Racks, J. Stalin	I Am...The Bridge
2009	"Pro Ball"	Philthy Rich, Chris Da 5th	Free Philthy Rich
2009	"All Gas"	Murder fa Hire, J. Stalin	The Hop Out
2009	"This Is How We Get It"	Young Lean, Mr. Tower	Young Lean
2009	"Pump Up the Volume"	D-Lo, J. Stalin	The Tonite Show with D-Lo
2009	"Murda4hire, Pt. 2"	Philthy Rich, J. Stalin	Loyalty B4 Royalty
2009	"Throw a 100"	Philthy Rich, Lil Rue, Lil Blood, Ronald Mack	Funk Season
2009	"Use a Bitch"	J. Stalin, Guce, Killa Keise, Philthy Rich, Beeda Weeda, Young Jun3	Giants & Elephants
2009	"Another Quelo"	J. Stalin, Guce	Giants & Elephants
2009	"You Ain't Finna Play Me"	Young Gully	The Tonite Show with Young Gully
2009	"U Don't Want No Problems"	AG Cubano, Jeneral Lee	Feet on the Street
2010	"Lyrical Exercise"	J. Stalin	Prenuptial Agreement
2010	"Money on the Way"	J. Stalin, Jallah	Prenuptial Agreement
2010	"When It's Real"	J. Stalin, Dubb 20	Prenuptial Agreement
2010	"I'm a Gangsta"	Money Boyz, Bruce Banna	Got 'Em Hatin'
2010	"Magnum"	Money Boyz, King James, Lil Rue	Got 'Em Hatin'
2010	"Locked Up"	Philthy Rich, M.A.C., Purple, Birdman	Funk Season 2
2010	"Da Town" (Remix)	Yukmouth, Richie Rich, Beeda Weeda, London, Agerman, Kafani, Lee Majors, G-Stack	Free at Last
2010	"Plead da 5th"	Philthy Rich, Purple	Loyalty B4 Royalty, Vol. 2
2010	"Out Here"	Dem Hoodstarz, DJ Fresh	The Tonite Show with Dem Hoodstarz
2010	"Urban Tactics"	Dem Hoodstarz, Keak da Sneak, Yukmouth, T-Nutty, Sleepy D	The Tonite Show with Dem Hoodstarz
2010	"Last Call"	J. Stalin, Lil Kev	Women & Money
2010	"Playin' Wit Fire"	J. Stalin, Philthy Rich	The Real World, Vol. 3
2010	"Allergic to Niggaz"	J. Stalin, Philthy Rich	The Real World, Vol. 3
2011	"What I Call Hyphy"	Dubb 20, Co	The Preview
2011	"Cuzblood" (Remix)	T-Nutty, Mitchy Slick	The Tonite Show with T-Nutty - Channel 24 St.
2011	"Robo (R2D2)"	Richie Rich, J. Stalin	Town Bidness, Pt. 2
2011	"Take It Back"	J. Stalin, Beeda Weeda	I'm Sellin' Dope
2011	"Talkin' to a Ghost"	J. Stalin, L'Jay	I'm Sellin' Dope
2012	"Get It Off the Curb"	Retro, Dubb 20	It Ain't Easy Being Peezy
2012	"Bofessional"	Retro, Beeda Weeda	It Ain't Easy Being Peezy
2012	"Solid"	Retro, Bueno	It Ain't Easy Being Peezy
2012	"Optimo"	Retro, Dubb 20	It Ain't Easy Being Peezy
2012	"Bank Up"	Lil Blood, Young Nu	Methadone: Kicking The Habit
2012	"Get Set"	The Mekanix, Go Boyz, Kaz Kyzah, J. Stalin	Chop Shop
2012	"Down on Me"	Lil Blood, Boo Banga	Cream Soda & Purple Syrup
2012	"Pigeon Coup"	J. Stalin, L'Jay, Ya Boy	Memoirs of a Curb Server
2012	"Show Em Wassup"	Cousin Fik, B-Legit	The Tonite Show with Cousin Fik
2012	"Fat Woman"	The Jacka, DJ Fresh, J. Stalin, Skeme	The Tonite Show with The Jacka
2012	"I Don't Ghostride"	Beeda Weeda, Kaz Kyzah	Da Thizzness
2012	"Show Em Wassup"	Cousin Fik, B-Legit	The Tonite Show with Cousin Fik
2012	"So Good"	J. Stalin, Lil Blood	Bottom of the 9th
2012	"Sippin' on Bobo"	Bobo, Mayback, Luciano	Imagination
2012	"Gettin' Gwaped"	Bobo	Imagination
2012	"Murdera"	Bobo, Philthy Rich, L'Jay	Imagination
2012	"No Snitch"	Bobo, Keak da Sneak	Imagination
2013	"Federal Nightmares"	HD, Thrill	Federal Thoughts (Kidnapping, Extortion & Corruption)
2013	"Get Money"	Lee Majors	Turkey Bag Boy
2013	"Jade"	Joe Blow, Cellski, Ampichino	Blow
2013	"Look Into My Eyes"	Stevie Joe	Live on the Wire
2013	"1 Nation"	Lambo Lace, Rydah J. Klyde	Come Work 4 Me
2013	"Goin' Back"	Rydah J. Klyde	Klyde Fisher
2013	"Lil Boosie"	Lil Blood	Methadone, Pt. 2
2014	"Ready to Ride Livewire" (Remix)	Philthy Rich, Stevie Joe, J. Stalin, Lil Blood	Philthy Fresh 2
2014	"Rolling in These Streets"	Davina, B-Legit, Lil Raider	Menace 2 Society Presents: Northern California Gangsters & Thugs Vol. 4
2014	"On the Side of Me"	J. Stalin	S.I.D. (Shining In Darkness)
2014	"Life Like Mine"	Fat Danny, Smokey Loc, Da Plug, Youngsta	Thru tha Eyes of a Real Homeboy
