= From a Boy to a Man =

Studio album by San Quinn
- Released: September 16, 2008
- Genre: Hip hop
- Label: Done Deal Entertainment; SMC Recordings
- Producer: Automatic; Big D The Impossible; CHOPS; Cozmo; Davey D; Dex Beats; Gene Boggs; Iconz; Left; Mike The Producer; Sean T; Traxamillion; Uncle Steve

San Quinn chronology
Extreme Danger (2007)	From a Boy to a Man (2008)	Welcome to Scokland (2008)

Professional ratings
Review scores
Source	Rating
HipHopDX	3.5/5

From a Boy to a Man is the seventh solo studio album by American rapper San Quinn. It was released on September 16, 2008 through Done Deal Entertainment and SMC Recordings. Production was handled by Automatic, Big D The Impossible, Chops, Cozmo, Davey D, Dex Beats, Gene Boggs, Iconz, Left, Mike The Producer, Sean T, Traxamillion and Uncle Steve. It features guest appearances from 18, Bailey, Boo Banger, Chops, Cozmo, Homewrecka, Lil' Quinn, Mistah F.A.B., PSD Tha Drivah, Too $hort and Willy Hen.

The album did not make it to the US Billboard 200, however, it peaked at number 47 on the Top R&B/Hip-Hop Albums, number 20 on the Top Rap Albums and number 24 on the Heatseekers Albums.

== Track listing ==
No.	Title	Producer(s)	Length
1.	"Boy to a Man (Intro)"	Dex Beats	3:30
2.	"They're All Waitin' on Me"	Cozmo	5:02
3.	"Wind It Up"	Iconz	4:25
4.	"Double Dose of Gangsta" (featuring CHOPS)	CHOPS	3:46
5.	"Rockin' Up Work"	Dex Beats	3:31
6.	"Reinforced Steel" (featuring P.S.D. Tha Drivah and Cozmo)	Davey D	4:27
7.	"We All Gone Eat"	Davey D	4:04
8.	"My Brother" (featuring Bailey)	Automatic	4:17
9.	"Upside Down"	Gene Boggs; Uncle Steve	3:34
10.	"Dreamin' of Riches" (featuring Homewrecka)	Big D The Impossible	4:08
11.	"3rd Eye"	Dex Beats	3:40
12.	"Catch a Body" (featuring Boo Banga)	Automatic	4:31
13.	"Billionaire (What We Call Livin')" (featuring Lil' Quinn)	Big D The Impossible; Davey D; Mike The Producer	2:40
14.	"Ready to Go" (featuring Willy Hen)	Davey D; Mike The Producer	3:00
15.	"One of Them Gangstas" (featuring 18)	Sean T	4:22
16.	"My Zone"	Dex Beats	3:37
17.	"Devotion" (featuring Too Short, Mistah F.A.B. and CHOPS)	CHOPS	4:03
18.	"Do Ya' Thizzle"	Traxamillion	3:17
19.	"Kill the Connect"	Left	4:15

== Charts ==
Chart (2008)	Peak position
US Top R&B/Hip-Hop Albums (Billboard)	47
US Top Rap Albums (Billboard)	20
US Heatseekers Albums (Billboard)	24
