= J. Stalin =

American rapper (born 1983)

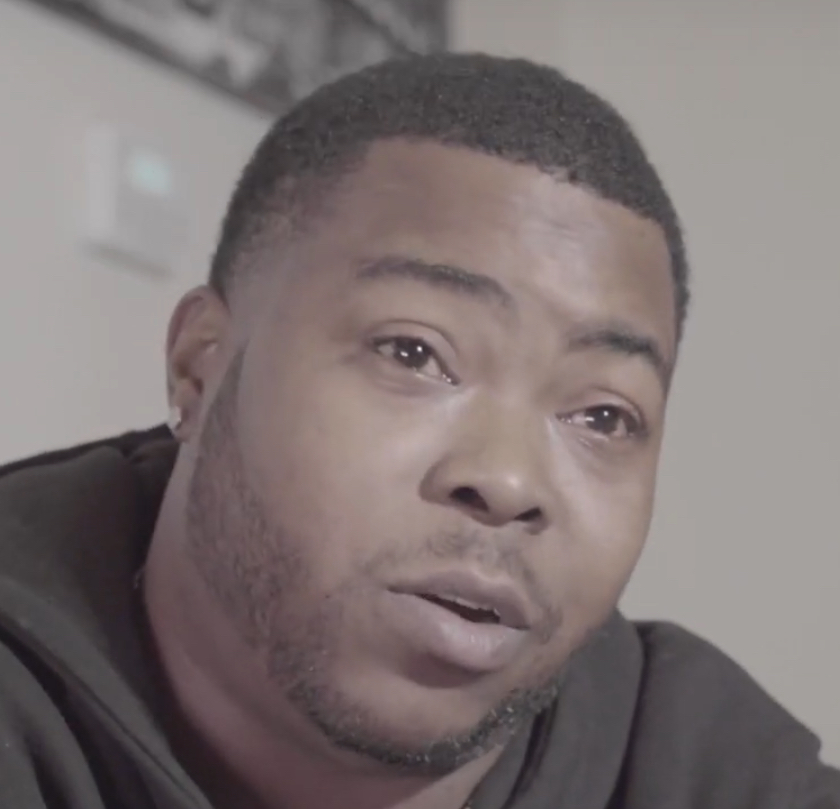
- Smith in 2019

Background information
- Born: Jovan Smith; January 25, 1983 (age 43)
- Origin: Oakland, California, U.S.
- Genres: West Coast hip-hop; hyphy
- Occupations: Rapper; songwriter
- Years active: 2002–present
- Label: SMC

Jovan Smith (born January 25, 1983), better known by his stage name J. Stalin (also J Stalin or J-Stalin), is an American rapper from the Cypress Village housing projects in West Oakland. In 2007, he signed to Zoo Entertainment Production Company run by artist The Mekanix, who described his style as a variant of hyphy known as "Go".

== Biography ==
Smith was born into poverty and earned money as a child by selling candy bars on the BART trains. Around age 16, he began recording and selling rap music. As a youth he sold drugs in his local housing projects and spent eleven months on parole for drug dealing.

== Musical career ==
Smith references Joseph Stalin in his stage name because they shared the same initials, and "...He was short like me, but he was always smashin' on everybody." In a 2007 interview he remarked about his home and lifestyle, "This is West Oakland, man. This is the bottoms right here." He went on to say that the crime rate in his neighborhood was so high, the city had remodeled the housing units in his housing project to remove the back doors so that criminals could not escape from home raids by the police.

Stalin's first widely released performances arose when a DJ Daryl, a local recording studio owner, placed him on a track he was recording. A colleague of Daryl's, Richie Rich was impressed enough to put Stalin on three tracks in his 2002 album Nixon Pryor Roundtree album and two more as a member of Rich's group, the Replacement Killers. He later recorded and performed with artists such as G-Stack, Beeda Weeda, Keak Da Sneak and San Quinn, E-40, Luniz, The Team, The Frontline, Mob Figaz, Yukmouth and Shock G. As of 2006, he had released roughly 7 mixtapes and had four releases scheduled for 2007.The Mekanix and Zoo Entertainment released On Behalf Of The Streets on October 31, 2006.

== Discography ==
=== Albums, mixtapes, collaborations, compilations ===
- 2006: J Stalin & The Mekanix - On Behalf Of The Streets
- 2006: R.N.B. Mixtape (Silence The Lamb)
- 2006: Stamp Of Approval (The Mixtape)
- 2006: The Early Morning Shift (Mixtape Magazine Edition)
- 2006: J Stalin & DJ.Fresh - The Real World West Oakland
- 2007: Slappin’ In The Trunk (Volume 4)
- 2007: Warning Shots
- 2007: J Stalin & Shady Nate - The Early Morning Shift (Volume 2)
- 2007: J Stalin & Beeda Weeda & DJ.Fresh - The Tonite Show With J Stalin & Beeda Weeda
- 2008: Gas Nation
- 2008: Nuthin' But Slap 7
- 2008: Warning Shots (Volume 2)
- 2008: J Stalin & Beeda Weeda - Quit Hatin' On The Bay (Town Thizzness Special Edition)
- 2008: Welcome To The Slap House
- 2008: J Stalin & Shady Nate & Jay Jonah aka Livewire Da Gang - Pay Ya Self Or Spray Ya Self
- 2009: Livewire - Livewire Radio
- 2009: Livewire - The Empire
- 2009: J Stalin & Mayback & DJ.Fresh - The Real World East-West Oakland (Part 2)
- 2009: Prenup (The Leak): Mixtape
- 2009: Livewire - Livewire Radio (Volume 2)
- 2009: J Stalin & Guce - Giants & Elephants
- 2010: Prenuptial Agreement
- 2010: The Annulment
- 2010: Livewire - Southern Hospitlaity
- 2010: J Stalin & Philthy Rich - The Early Morning Shift (Volume 3)
- 2010: Livewire - Livewire Radio (Volume 3)
- 2010: J Stalin & Lil Kev - Women & Money
- 2010: J Stalin & DJ.Fresh - The Real World West Oakland (Part 3)
- 2011: J Stalin & Young Doe - Diesel Therapy
- 2011: Livewire - I Pledge Allegiance To The Wire
- 2011: J Stalin & DJ.Fresh - The Real World West Oakland (Part 3 Instrumentals)
- 2011: J Stalin & Hell Rell & Lord Geez - Guilty By Association
- 2011: I'm Sellin' Dope
- 2012: The Body Snatchers
- 2012: J Stalin & Shady Nate & Kaz Kyzah & The Mekanix aka The Go Boyz - Get Set (EP)
- 2012: J Stalin & L'Jay - Bottom Of The 9th
- 2012: J Stalin & Shady Nate & Kaz Kyzah & The Mekanix aka The Go Boyz - Everything Must Go
- 2012: The Best Of J Stalin (Volume 1)
- 2012: Memoirs Of A Curb Server
- 2012: Livewire - The Mafia
- 2012: Livewire - I Pledge Allegiance To The Wire (Part 2)
- 2013: The Return Of The Body Snatchers 2
- 2013: J Stalin & DJ.Fresh - Miracle On 10th Street
- 2013: J Stalin & DJ.Fresh - Nightmare On 10th Street
- 2013: Livewire - Down To The Wire
- 2013: J Stalin & DJ.Fresh - Miracle & Nightmare On 10th Street (Deluxe Edition)
- 2014: J Stalin & DJ.Fresh - The Real World West Oakland (Trilogy)
- 2014: S.I.D. (Shinning In Darkness)
- 2014: Livewire - Down To The Wire 2
- 2014: The Best Of J Stalin (Volume 2)
- 2014: Livewire - Livewire Radio (Volume 4): The Blood That Drips From Stalin’s Pen
- 2014: S.I.D. (Shinning In Darkness): Deluxe Edition
- 2015: The Features
- 2015: J Stalin & Retro - The Good Life
- 2015: Tears Of Joy
- 2015: Livewire - The Saga Continues
- 2015: Bout To Pour Up
- 2015: J Stalin & DJ.Fresh - The Real World West Oakland (Part 4)
- 2016: The Body Snatchers (Part 3)
- 2016: I Shoulda Stayed In School
- 2016: J Stalin & The Mekanix - On Behalf Of The Streets 2
- 2017: My Dark Passenger
- 2017: J Stalin & DJ.Fresh - The Tonite Show With J Stalin
- 2017: Gas Nation 2
- 2017: I Don't Sell Dope No More
- 2017: Livewire - Still Winning
- 2018: Avatar
- 2018: J Stalin & DJ.Fresh - Miracle & Nightmare On 10th Street (Part 2)
- 2018: Tears Of Joy 2
- 2019: Bay Area State Of Mind
- 2019: J Stalin & Lil Blood - 1034
- 2019: Cypress Village
- 2019: Avatar 2
- 2019: J Stalin & Young Doe - Diesel Therapy 2
- 2019: Livewire - Still Winning 2 (A Livewire Soundtrack)
- 2020: J Stalin & Da Krse - Wired In
- 2020: Bay Area State Of Mind 2
- 2020: J Stalin & DJ.Fresh - The Real World West Oakland (Part 5)
- 2020: The Price Of Fame
- 2020: J Stalin & Young Spudd - Reservoir Dogs
- 2020: J Stalin & Da Krse - Wired In 2
- 2020: J Stalin & DJ.Fresh - The Real World West Oakland (Part 5 Instrumentals)
- 2021: J Stalin & Da Krse - Wired In 3
- 2021: The Early Morning Shift 4
- 2021: J Stalin & Young Doe - Diesel Therapy 3
- 2021: J Stalin & The Mekanix - On Behalf Of The Streets 3
- 2021: J Stalin & Footz The Beast - Covid 41510
- 2022: J Stalin & DJ.Fresh - The Real World West Oakland (Part 6)
- 2022: J Stalin & DJ.Fresh - The Tonite Show With J Stalin (Instrumentals)
- 2022: J Stalin & Loverboii - Women & Money 2
- 2022: Music Junkies (Episode 1)
- 2022: J Stalin & Da Krse - Wired In 4
- 2022: Tears Of Joy 3
- 2022: J Stalin & DJ.Fresh - The Real World West Oakland (Part 6 Instrumentals)
- 2023: Prenuptial Agreement 2
- 2023: J Stalin & Da Krse - Wired In 5
- 2023: J Stalin & Young Doe - Diesel Therapy 4
- 2023: Prenuptial Agreement 2 (Deluxe Edition)
- 2023: M.O.B. Museum
- 2024: Me Vs Me
- 2024: Welcome To The Ghetto
- 2024: J Stalin & Lyjah - Money Laundering
- 2024: J Stalin & Young Doe & Anthony Danza - The Bergin Hunt & Fish Club
- 2024: Me Vs Me 2
- 2024: Bless You
- 2024: J Stalin & J Diggs - The 10th Letta
- 2024: Scarface
- 2024: Me Vs Me 3
- 2025: Scarface (Part 2): The Recovery
- 2025: Scarface 3
- 2025: Welcome To The Ghetto (Part 2)
- 2026: J Stalin & Sneaky Mike - Lyrical Exercise (Volume 1)
- 2026: J Stalin & The Mekanix - On Behalf Of The Streets: The Trilogy (20th Anniversary Edition)
  Singles
- Scrapers (2002)
- West Oakland Marines (2003)
- 10th Street (2004)
- It’s Your’s (featuring The Deliquents) (2004)
- The Bank Job (featuring The Deliquents & Harm) (2004)
- I’m A D-Boy (2004)
- Player Lady (2004)
- Pop My Collar (2004)
- Sing A Sad Song (featuring Taylormade) (2005)
- Take Me Where You Need To Go (featuring Taylormade & ROB) (2005)
- My 808 (featuring The Mekanix) (2005)
- That’s My Name (featuring The Mekanix) (2006)
- Banga Dance (featuring The Mekanix) (2006)
- Let’s Get It On Tonight (2006)
- Banga Dance (Remix) (featuring The Mekanix, Keak Da Sneak, San Quinn, & Shady Nate) (2007)
- Paint The Town (featuring DJ.Fresh) (2008)
- Show Me (Original Version) (featuring The Mekanix) (2008)
- Birthday (2009)
- Rock Day (featuring The Mekanix) (2009)
- Across The Water (featuring Goldtoes & Philthy Rich) (2010)
- Back In Time (featuring Nijay Sincere & Taylormade) (2010)
- The Show (2010)
- Banga Dance 2010 (Original Version) (featuring DJ.Fresh) (2010)
- Dope Game (Original Version) (featuring L’Jay & DJ.Fresh) (2010)
- Sex On The Rug (featuring Young Doe) (2011)
- Dragon Fly (featuring Taylormade) (2011)
- Prove It (featuring DJ.Fresh) (2011)
- Sober (Original Version) (featuring J Valentine) (2011)
- Who Are U (Original Extended Version) (featuring DJ.Fresh) (2011)
- Pull Up Spinnin’ (featuring Taylormade & AP.9) (2012)
- The Chop Shop (featuring Yukmouth, Laroo, & The Mekanix) (2012)
- J Stalin & Shady Nate & Kaz Kyzah & The Mekanix aka The Go Boyz - Get Set (2012)
- J Stalin & Shady Nate & Kaz Kyzah & The Mekanix aka The Go Boyz - This Is Where U Go (Remix) (2012)
- Living In Hell (featuring DJ.Fresh) (2012)
- Molly Song (2012)
- I Stay Strapped (2013)
- Pray For Me (featuring Trae Tha Truth & The Mekanix) (2013)
- F*k That (featuring Too $hort & The Mekanix) (2014)
- Weirdo (featuring June & P-Lo) (2014)
- Meth (2014)
- Age (featuring DJ.Fresh) (2015)
- Remind Me (featuring Philthy Rich & Shady Nate) (2015)
- Bye Felicia (featuring DJ.Fresh & L’Jay) (2015)
- Face Shots (featuring June) (2015)
- Out Da Mud (2016)
- Bricks (featuring June) (2016)
- Officer Don’t Shoot (featuring June) (2016)
- Get Me Some (featuring Nef The Pharaoh, Lil Blood, & The Mekanix) (2016)
- Party Jumpin’ (Part 2) (featuring The Jacka, G-Eazy, & The Mekanix) (2016)
- Battery Acid (2017)
- In My Feelins (2017)
- 5 Minutes Of Game (2017)
- Same Thang (featuring TD Slaps & Dubb 20) (2017)
- Still In It (featuring TD Slaps) (2017)
- Girls On Call (featuring Stevie Joe, TD Slaps, Scoot Of The Hoodstarz, & DS) (2017)
- Money On The Line (featuring TD Slaps) (2018)
- Nightmare On 10th Street Returns (featuring DJ.Fresh) (2018)
- Living Lavish (featuring DJ.Fresh) (2018)
- P*ssy Ni*gga (featuring DJ.Fresh) (2018)
- Old Town Road (Remix) (2019)
- I Love N.Y. (featuring Joseph Kay) (2019)
- Atlanta Flow (2019)
- Banned From The Catalyst (2019)
- Ain’t Takin’ Mine (featuring Da Krse) (2019)
- Beast Mode (featuring The Mekanix, FON Check, & Lil James) (2020)
- King Of The Curb (featuring June) (2020)
- In My Zone (featuring DJ.Fresh) (2020)
- Corner (featuring TD Slaps) (2020)
- My Religion (Remix) (featuring Blanco Balling) (2020)
- Old Me (2022)
- 3 Minutes (featuring Philthy Rich) (2022)
- A Lot Of Money (featuring 22nd Jim) (2022)
- Dashboard (featuring Lil Blood) (2022)
- Christmas (Freestyle) (2022)
- New Years (Freestyle) (2023)
- Thug Love (featuring Da Krse) (2023)
- From The Ground (featuring Young Doe & Aktual) (2023)
- Don’t Blow It (featuring 4Rax of The Mekanix, GB, & Yosama) (2023)
- B.N.E. (2023)
- No Money (2024)
- Dope Man (2024)
- Jose (2024)
- Spoiled (featuring Slimmy B) (2024)
- Walking Ticket (2024)
- Love Me (2026)
- Scissor Hands (featuring The Mekanix) (2026)
