= Philthy Rich =

American rapper from California

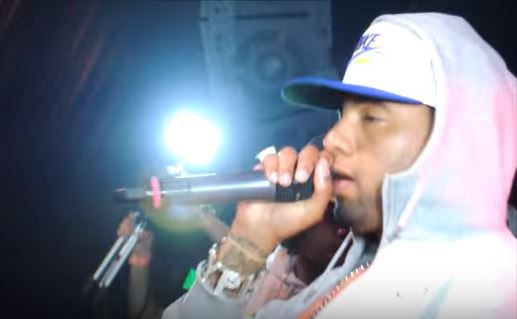
- Beasley performing in 2014

Background information
- Born: Phillip Anthony Beasley; January 30, 1983 (age 43); Seminary, East Oakland, Oakland, California, U.S.
- Genre: West Coast hip-hop
- Occupations: Rapper; actor; songwriter
- Years active: 2004–present
- Labels: EMPIRE; RBC; SMC; FOD; Livewire
- Website: www.philthyrichfod.com

Phillip Anthony Beasley (born January 30, 1983), known professionally as Philthy Rich, is an American rapper and convicted felon from Oakland, California.

He began his musical career in 2004, and enlisted local rappers including Mistah F.A.B., J. Stalin, and Shady Nate to embark on his "Stan Bizzness BG's" tour, which was cancelled after Beasley was arrested for selling cocaine and cannabis, for which he was sentenced to six years in prison the following year. His subsequent criminal trials include firearms conspiracy, unlawful weapon possessions, and other federal charges.

Despite remaining independent, he has collaborated with mainstream artists including Rick Ross, Migos, Gucci Mane, French Montana, B.o.B, Jeremih, Fabolous, Waka Flocka Flame, Chief Keef, Juelz Santana, E-40, and Kaz Bałagane among others.

== Personal life ==
Beasley grew up in the Seminary neighborhood of Oakland.

On February 13, 2011, Beasley was arrested with two other people after a rap concert at a nightclub in San Francisco, California, for owning a Bentley that was reported stolen out of Las Vegas.

In August 2012, Beasley was shot three times and drove himself to a hospital where he was released the following day.

== Controversy ==
On September 25, 2013, he released a track entitled "Swear to God" featuring Kurt Diggler. It dissed Bay Area rappers Kafani, Messy Marv & DB Tha General. The track is to appear on his upcoming album N.E.R.N.L. 3. In response, DB released a diss track at Philthy entitled "Luke 16:13" featuring Quise the Criminal on September 27, to be released on his upcoming album Motel 6. That same day Kafani released a diss track entitled "Philthy You a Verse Lick", and "Philthy Bitch" the next day, where he described how he decided to remove Philthy Rich from his song "Slide Thru" featuring Rayven Justice. On September 28, Philthy Rich released another diss track entitled "The Ice Queen, The Girl Girl & The Bebe Store" which also dissed Sacramento-based rapper, Lavish D. On October 1, 2013, Lavish released two diss tracks entitled "Lyrical Ether" and "King of Oakland". In response, Shady Nate & Philthy released a diss track entitled "Fuck Lavish D". Messy Marv plans on releasing a diss record entitled Philthy Rich Is a Bitch on October 22. On October 15, Philthy released a diss record entitled Messy Marv a.k.a. the Girl Girl Is a Fake Blood, containing a freestyle diss over Drake's "Pound Cake / Paris Morton Music 2". The next day, Marv dissed Philthy in a track entitled "I'm Right Here".

== Discography ==
=== Studio albums ===
- Funk Or Die (2009)
- Loyalty B4 Royalty (2009)
- Neighborhood Supastar (2009)
- Neighborhood Supastar 2 (2010)
- Loyalty B4 Royalty Vol. 2 (2010)
- Trip'n 4 Life (2011)
- Loyalty B4 Royalty Vol. 3 (2011)
- Kill Zone (2012)
- N.E.R.N.L. (2012)
- N.E.R.N.L. 2 (2013)
- N.E.R.N.L. 3 (2014)
- Real Niggas Back In Style (2016)
- Sem God (2017)
- Fake Love (2018)
- N.E.R.N.L. 4 (2018)
- East Oakland Legend (2019)
- Big 59 (2019)
- Hometown Hero (2020)
- Real Hate (2020)
- Phillip Beasley EP (2021)
- Solidified EP (2021)
- Motivational Purpose (2022)
- Federal Indictment (2023)
- King Of Oakland (2023)
- Real, Rich, & Respected (2025)
- Heart Of The Hood (2025)
- T$GO (2026)
- T$GO 2 (Motion Files) (2026)
- FOD The New Death Row (2026)
- Seminary Hall of Fame (2026)

=== EP’s ===
- Slap House: Thizz Mix (2009)
- Funk Or Die: The Leak (2009)
- Flyest Figga On 2 Feet (2009)
- Trip'n 4 Life: The Leak (2009)
- Streets On Lock EP (2010)
- Weekend In Detroit (2021)
- Weekend In Houston (2023)
- Weekend In LA (2023)

=== Independent albums ===
- Slap House Vol. 4 (2008)
- Free Philthy Rich (2009)
- Quit Hatin' On The Bay (2009)
- Funk Season (2009)
- Funk Season 2 (2010)
- Funk Season 3 (2011)
- SemCity Money Man (2014)
- SemCity Money Man 2 (2014)
- SemCity Money Man 3 (2015)
- SemCity Money Man 4 (2016)

=== Mixtapes ===
- Hood Rich 2 (2006)
- Streets On Lock (2008)
- PhilthyFresh (2008)
- Hood Rich 3 (2011)
- GSlaps Radio Vol. 2 (2011)
- True Religion Shawty (2012)
- Conspiracy (with The Hoodstarz) (2012)
- Kill Zone: The Leak (2012)
- Vampin' In The Bay (with DJ Racks & Jim Jones) (2013)
- Messy Marv a.k.a. The Girl Girl Is A Fake Blood (2013)
- Hood Rich 4 (2016)
- Seminary (2017)
- Neighborhood Supastar 4 (2017)

=== with The Boy Boy AKA Messy Marv ===
- Neighborhood Supastar Vol. 3 (2011)

=== with Chris Lockett ===
- 11-5900 (2012)

=== with DJ Fresh ===
- My Block: Welcome To Sem City (2008)
- My Block: Welcome To Sem City 2 (2010)

=== with FOD Entertainment ===
- FOD The Infrastructure (2022)
- Motion Family (2022)

=== with J-Diggs ===
- Izm 101 (2012)

=== with J. Stalin ===
- The Early Morning Shift, Vol. 3 (2010)

=== with M Dot 80 ===
- A~1 Since Day One (2014)

=== with Preddy Boy ===
- Itchy Palm$ (Volume 2) (2014)

=== with Anonymous That Dude ===
- A Hustlas Motivation (2014)

=== with DuBBleOO ===
- M.P.R. (Money, Power, Respect) (2014)

=== with Pooh Hefner ===
- #NOBFE (2012)
- #NOBFE Vol. 2 (2013)
- #NOBFE Vol. 3 (No Hold’n Hands & Kick’n Cans) (2013)
- #NOBFE Vol. 3 (Deluxe Edition) (2014)
- #NOBFE Vol. 4 (If She Look She Took) (2018)

=== with Ray Rydah ===
- Tha Skumbagz (2008)

=== with Joe Blow ===
- MOBWire (2015)

=== with Stevie Joe ===
- Philthy Fresh (2009)
- Philthy Fresh 2 (Deluxe Edition) (2014)
- Philthy Fresh 3 (2017)

=== with Teek da Kid ===
- Town Bizz Allstars (2009)

=== with Thizz Nation ===
- Thizz Nation Vol. 27 (2010)

=== with Guce ===
- Bully’s Wit Fullys (2013)

=== with Mozzy ===
- Political Ties (2016)

=== with Yowda ===
- American Greed (2016)

=== with Kae One ===
- Rich Nigga Issues (2016)

=== with Peezy ===
- East Side (2018)

=== with Prezi ===
- Hood Presidents (2018)

=== with YID ===
- Sem City Kane City (2018)

=== with Cookie Money ===
- Philthy Money EP (2018)

=== with FMB DZ ===
- Can’t Funk Broke (2018)

=== with C.M.L ===
- Fuck Yo Politics (2019)

=== with Toohda Band$ ===
- Money Motivated (2021)

=== with Skinny T ===
- Shit Talker 4 (2022)
- CBFW 3 EP (2025)

=== with Yung X ===
- Principles & Morals (2024)

=== with Motion Mall ===
- My Block: Welcome To Sem City 4 (2024)

=== Singles ===
- 2008: "Straight Outta Oakland" (featuring Ros, J. Stalin, Stevie Joe, Kaz Kyzah, Shady Nate, Lil Blood, Eddi Projex, Beeda Weeda, Keak da Sneak, Mistah F.A.B. & Too Short)
- 2009: "Follow the Money" (featuring Stevie Joe & Kaz Kyzah)
- 2009: "Teeth 2 Feet" (featuring Keak Da Sneak & Stevie Joe)
- 2009: "I Represent It"
- 2010: "Feeln' Like Pac" (featuring E-40)
- 2010: "Do It Better" (featuring Lil Kev)
- 2012: "Moving Birds" (featuring Waka Flocka Flame & YG Hootie)
- 2014: "Straight to the Money" (featuring Montana Montana Montana)
- 2015: "Showtime" (featuring Icewear Vezzo)
- 2015: "Make a Living" (featuring Iamsu!)

=== Song features ===
- 2010: "Ain’t Goin Out Like That" By Ill Slim Collin (featuring Philthy Rich, L Boy, & K Hurl)
- 2012: 'Stevie Joe Presents: Who Got Next?, "Cali Connected" By Sheye T. (featuring Philthy Rich & Mr. J Noxx)
