= The Delinquents (group) =

American hip hop group

- Origin: Oakland, California, U.S.
- Genres: West Coast hip hop, gangsta rap
- Years active: 1991–present
- Labels: Dank Or Die; Thizz Entertainment
- Members: G-Stack; V-White and also G-Black
- Website: The Delinquents at MySpace

The Delinquents are an American hip hop group from Oakland, California, composed of two members, Glen Jones a.k.a. G-Stack, Vidal Prevost a.k.a. V-White (formerly known as V-Dal) and Ghost Producer Gregory Turner a.k.a. Lord Gregory(formerly known as G-Black. They were established in July 1991 and were known for their playful brand of gangsta rap. G-Stack is a member of Thizz Entertainment.

== Critical reception ==
Their first album, Big Moves, was rated three out of five stars by AllMusic.

== Discography ==
=== Studio albums ===
- Big Moves (1997)
- Bosses Will Be Bosses (1999)
- Town Business Part I (2003)
- Authenticity (with The Mekanix) (2023)

=== Compilation albums ===
- The Audio Biography: 1992–2000 Vol. 1 (2001)
- The Dominion (2001)
- The Dominion Continues... (2002)

=== Mixtapes ===
- Delinquents – Mix CD Vol. 1 (2003)
- The Purple Project – Mix CD Vol. 2 (2003)
- Have Money, Have Heart Part 1 – Mix CD Vol. 3 (2005)

=== Extended plays ===
- Insane (1992)
- The Alleyway (1994)
- Outta Control (1995)

=== Solo projects ===
==== G-Stack ====
- Thizz Nation Vol. 18 (with Mistah F.A.B.) (2007)
- Welcome To Purple City – Vol. 1 (2007)
- Tha Color Purple – Vol. 2 (2007)
- Dr. Purp Thumb (2009)

==== V-White ====
- Perfect Timin’ (2007)
- Stimulus Package (with The Politician) (2010)
- Streets Can Vouch (with The Politician) (2010)
- The Gas Station (with The Politician) (2011)
