= Young Noble discography =

This is the discography of rapper Young Noble.

== Albums ==
=== Studio albums ===
- Noble Justice (May 28, 2002, Outlaw)
- Son of God (November 12, 2012, Outlaw)
- Powerful (September 13, 2016, Outlaw)
- 3rd Eye View (September 13, 2019, Outlaw)
- Outlaw University (September 13, 2023, Outlaw Recordz)

=== Collaborative albums ===
- With Layzie Bone of Bone Thugs-n-Harmony – Thug Brothers (February 7, 2006, Real Talk)
- With E.D.I. of Outlawz – Against All Oddz (March 7, 2006, Real Talk)
- With stic.man of dead prez – Soldier 2 Soldier (October 3, 2006, Real Talk)
- With Hussein Fatal – Thug in Thug Out (September 11, 2007, High Powered Entertainment/Thugtertainment/Outlaw/Koch)
- With Lil' Flip – All Eyez on Us (March 4, 2008, Real Talk/E1 Music)
- With Deuce Deuce of Concrete Mob – Fast Life (February 5, 2013, Concrete Enterprises/Outlaw)
- With Gage Gully – The Year of the Underdogz (May 7, 2013, A.G.E. Entertainment/Outlaw)
- With Hussein Fatal – Jerzey Giantz (March 17, 2014, Thugtertainment/Outlaw)
- With Deuce Deuce of Concrete Mob – The Code (April 25, 2016, Concrete Enterprises)
- With Krayzie Bone of Bone Thugs-n-Harmony – Thug Brothers 2 (June 16, 2017, Real Talk)
- With Krayzie Bone of Bone Thugs-n-Harmony – Thug Brothers 3 (October 6, 2017, Real Talk)
- With Deuce Deuce of Concrete Mob – For My People (November 17, 2017, Concrete Enterprises)
- With Deuce Deuce of Concrete Mob – Growth (March 1, 2019, Concrete Enterprises)
- With Deuce Deuce of Concrete Mob – Watch the Signs (July 17, 2020, Concrete Enterprises)
- With Dirty Bert - Crazy 80's Babies (June 16, 2021, Outlaw Recordz/Broken Novel ENT)
- With Deuce Deuce of Concrete Mob – Purpose (March 3, 2023, Concrete Enterprises)
- With Rip the General – Optimism EP (January 10, 2025, Self-released)
- With stic – Integrity (June, 2025, Self-released)

=== Compilation albums ===
- Young Noble & JT the Bigga Figga Presents: Street Warz (October 22, 2002, Get Low/Outlaw)
- Noble Justice: The Lost Songs (March 23, 2010, Outlaw)

=== Extended plays ===
- Fire in My Soul (An Acoustic Experience) EP (October 28, 2022, Outlaw Recordz)
- Lucky Number 7 EP (November 10, 2023, Outlaw Recordz)
- Positive Vibes Only EP (January 5, 2024, Outlaw Recordz)
- The Last Outlaw EP (March 21, 2024, Outlaw Recordz)

=== Mixtapes ===
- Outlaw Rydahz Vol. 1 (March 6, 2012, Outlaw/NJ Entertainment)
- DJ Outlaw Presents Young Noble - Outlaw Nation (October 15, 2012, Outlaw)
- DJ Outlaw Presents Young Noble - Outlaw Nation Vol. 2 (April 15, 2013, Outlaw)
- Young Noble & Hussein Fatal Presents - Outlaw Nation Vol. 3 (September 12, 2013, Outlaw/Thugtertainment)
- Young Noble Presents - Outlaw Nation Vol. 4 (September 13, 2014, Outlaw)
- Young Noble Presents - Outlaw Nation Vol. 5 (June 16, 2018, Outlaw)
- Young Noble Presents - Outlaw Nation Vol. 6 (December 23, 2019, Outlaw)
- Young Noble Presents - Outlaw Nation Vol. 7 (April 9, 2021, Outlaw Recordz)
- Young Noble Presents - Outlaw Nation Vol. 8 (June 16, 2022, Outlaw Recordz)
- Young Noble Presents - Outlaw Nation Vol. 9 (March 15, 2024, Outlaw Recordz)

== Singles ==
=== As featured performer ===
- 2009: "Bad Enough" (Redzz aka RedMusicUk feat. Shade Sheist, TQ & Young Noble)
- 2010: "The International Way" (Zeus feat. Young Noble)
- 2011: "Girl Don't Give Up" (Nameless Kx feat. Aktual & Young Noble)
- 2012: "Home" (Perx feat. Young Noble)
- 2012: "Aim At da Police" (Calaber feat. Young Noble)
- 2012: "Harda" (Mista Joe feat. Young Noble)
- 2013: "Hustlers Anthem" (Kray feat. Young Noble & Bizzy Bone)
- 2013: "Get Em" (The Marsonist feat. Young Noble)
- 2013: "What I Stand for" (Tre Dolla feat. Young Noble & Hussein Fatal)

== Guest appearances ==
List of non-single guest appearances, with other performing artists, showing year released and album name
Title	Year	Artist(s)	Album
"Bomb First (My Second Reply)"	1996	2Pac, E.D.I.	Makaveli The Don - Killuminati: The 7 Day Theory
"Hail Mary"	1996	2Pac, Yaki Kadafi, Kastro, Prince Ital Joe	Makaveli The Don - Killuminati: The 7 Day Theory
"Life of an Outlaw"	1996	2Pac, E.D.I., Kastro, Napoleon, Bo-Roc	Makaveli The Don - Killuminati: The 7 Day Theory
"Just Like Daddy"	1996	2Pac, Yaki Kadafi, E.D.I.	Makaveli The Don - Killuminati: The 7 Day Theory
"Games"	1997	Cool-E, Napoleon, J-Sweet, Kastro, E.D.I.	Funk Fo' Life
"Hard Labor"	1998	C-Bo, Kastro, Napoleon, Storm, Big Lurch	Til My Casket Drops
"MFC Lawz"	1998	Heltah Skeltah, Napoleon, Storm, Doc Holiday	Magnum Force
"This Life of Mine"	1998	Bad Azz, Napoleon, Prince Ital Joe, Kastro, E.D.I.	Word on tha Streets
"Do Yo Thug Thang"	1998	Yukmouth, Napoleon, E.D.I.	Thugged Out: The Albulation
"Still Ballin'"	1998	Yukmouth, Napoleon, E.D.I., Kastro	Thugged Out: The Albulation
"I Don't Fuck with You"	1998	Geto Boys, DMG, Gotti, E.D.I., Napoleon, Kastro	Da Good da Bad & da Ugly
"Gun In My Mouth"	1998	Geto Boys, Napoleon, E.D.I.	Da Good da Bad & da Ugly
"Serenade My Life"	1998	Gonzoe, E.D.I.	If I Live and Nothing Happens
"It Only Rains Sometimes"	1999	Rappin' 4-Tay, E.D.I.	Introduction To Mackin'
"Immortal 2K"	1999	5th Ward Boyz, E.D.I., Kastro	P.W.A.: The Album... Keep It Poppin'
"How You Want It"	1999	Big Mike, Kastro, Napoleon, E.D.I.	Hard to Hit
"2000"	2000	Won G, Sylk-E. Fyne	Royal Impression
"Fuck the Fame"	2000	Little Bruce	Give It to Me Baby!
"The Big Time"	2000	Little Bruce, Napoleon, Young L	Give It to Me Baby!
"Knightmares"	2000	Knightowl, Bokie Loc	Knightmares
"And Yo"	2000	Scarface, Redman	The Last of a Dying Breed
"Thuggin' It Out"	2000	Do or Die, E.D.I.	Victory
"Got Gunz"	2000	Willie D, Kastro, E.D.I., Spice 1	Loved by Few, Hated by Many
"We Gone Ride"	2001	Yukmouth, Hussein Fatal, Napoleon, E.D.I.	Thug Lord: The New Testament
"Man Power"	2001	DIME	Poverty & Prosperity
"Stop Poppin Shit"	2001	Steady Mobb'n, E.D.I., Napoleon	Crime Buddies
"And What"	2001	5th Ward Boyz, E.D.I., Kastro	Recognize the Mob
"Dyin' 4 Rap (Remix)"	2001	Fredro Starr, Capone-N-Noreaga, Cuban Link	Firestarr
"Do the Math"	2001	Dorasel, Yukmouth, Phats Bossi	Unleash the Beast
"What?!"	2001	Big Syke, E.D.I., Kastro	Thug Law: Thug Life Outlawz Chapter 1
"Pay Day"	2001	Big Syke, Krayzie Bone, Mack 10	Thug Law: Thug Life Outlawz Chapter 1
"Casualtiez Of War"	2001	E.D.I., Napoleon, Muszamil, Ed Bone, Big Syke	Thug Law: Thug Life Outlawz Chapter 1
"Do the Math"	2001	Sean T, Napoleon, M.O.G.	Can I Shine?
"Hate the Game"	2001	Killa Tay, Napoleon, Luni Coleone, E.D.I.	Thug Thisle
"Turn da Heat Down"	2002	Spice 1, E.D.I., Napoleon	Spiceberg Slim
"Street Commando"	2002	Big Syke, Napoleon	Street Commando
"Don't Be Madd"	2002	200% Shady	200% Shady
"Peace Not War"	2002	JT the Bigga Figga, Bax-A-Billion, Damion Hall, Double D, Tha Gamblaz	Hustle Relentless
"Exclusively"	2002	JT the Bigga Figga, Double D, Ive Low, Tha Gamblaz	Hustle Relentless
"Fuck Em All"	2002	2Pac, Kadafi, E.D.I., Napoleon, Kastro	Better Dayz
"Whatcha Gonna Do?"	2002	2Pac, Kastro	Better Dayz
"There U Go"	2002	2Pac, Kastro, Kadafi, Big Syke, Jazze Pha	Better Dayz
"This Life I Lead"	2002	2Pac, Napoleon, Kastro, E.D.I.	Better Dayz
"Desperado"	2002	Yukmouth	United Ghettos of America
"United Ghettos of America"	2002	Yukmouth, C-Bo, Cold 187um, Mad Lion, MC Eiht, Napoleon	United Ghettos of America
"I'm an Outlaw"	2002	Hussein Fatal	FATAL
"My Niggaz"	2002	Hussein Fatal, Phats Bossi	FATAL
"I Wanna Be Free"	2002	Hussein Fatal, Napoleon	FATAL
"Stop Rattin"	2002	Hussein Fatal, E.D.I.	FATAL
"Born a Soulja"	2002	Kastro & E.D.I., Muszamil, Napoleon, Yukmouth	Blood Brothers
"Ride wit tha Lawz"	2002	E.D.I.	Blood Brothers
"Intro"	2002	Law-N-Orda	Ground Zero
"Taught You Betta"	2002	Hellraza	Hell Razed Us
"Ball or Die"	2002	Hellraza, E.D.I., Napoleon, Kastro	Hell Razed Us
"Lie To Me"	2002	Hellraza, Akwylah, Ya Yo, Napoleon	Hell Razed Us
"What You Wish For"	2002	MC Eiht, Napoleon	Underground Hero
"Blaze Up The City"	2002	10sion, Yukmouth, I.V.A.N. The Terrible, E.D.I., C-Bo, Napoleon	10sion
"War Gamez"	2002	Ray Luv, E.D.I., Kastro, Napoleon	A Prince in Exile
"What U No Bout"	2002	C-Bo, E.D.I., Napoleon	Life as a Rider
"Sick Thoughts"	2002	Big Syke, Mopreme Shakur, Napoleon, E.D.I.	BIG SYKE
"Thugzzz Pray II"	2002	Tray Deee, E.D.I., Napoleon	The General's List
"The Truth"	2003	Rome	Hustlin' Rap
"Want War"	2003	Sean T, A-Wax & Eddie Projex	Terrain Boss
"Dirty Jersey 2 E.P.A."	2003	MAC & A.K.	Hustle Music Vol. 1
"Ridin' for Pac"	2003	Bullys wit Fullys, Guce & Killa Tay, Napoleon, Kastro	Westside Stories
"Put 'Um Up"	2003	Big Syke, Mopreme Shakur	Thug Law: Thug Life Outlawz Chapter 2
"American Me"	2004	C-Bo, Chino Nino, Yukmouth	United Ghettos of America Vol. 2
"Thug Song"	2004	Louie Loc, Bad Azz, Yukmouth	Power Moves
"Laws of the Street"	2004	The Izrealz, Messy Marv, I-Rocc	Tha Re/Up
"Cock and Load"	2004	The Izrealz, Messy Marv, I-Rocc	Tha Re/Up
"The Uppercut"	2004	2Pac, E.D.I.	Loyal to the Game
"Black Cotton"	2004	2Pac, Eminem, Kastro	Loyal to the Game
"G.A.M.E."	2004	The Game	Untold Story
"Exclusively"	2004	The Game, Get Low Playaz	Untold Story
"We're Still Outlawz"	2004	H-Wood, Genesis, Izreal	The Major Leagues
"Bad Boy (Isy B. Remix)"	2005	Eko Fresh, 2Pac	Elektro Eko: Fick Immer Noch Deine Story
"Everything"	2005	Tre Mak, Daz Dillinger, J. Gotti	The One
"Live for Today"	2005	Taydatay, I-Rocc, Messy Marv	Urban Legendz
"Finally See"	2005	Tha Gamblaz, Goodfelonz, JT the Bigga Figga	Highly Flammable
"Everythang"	2005	J. Gotti, Daz Dillinger	Full 60
"Picture Me Rollin'"	2005	Play-N-Skillz, Paul Wall	The Album Before The Album
"Way Too Many"	2005	Layzie Bone, E.D.I., Stew Deez	It's Not a Game
"Restless"	2006	Trae	Restless
"Big Wheels"	2006	Killa Klump, Yukmouth, Layzie Bone	Killa Thugs
"Stuck Like Glue"	2006	Get Low Playaz	In the Streets of Filmoe
"I'm Good"	2006	Layzie Bone, Killa Klump	Cleveland
"Don't Stop"	2006	2Pac, Yaki Kadafi, Hussein Fatal, Big Syke, Stormey Coleman	Pac's Life
"Thug Affair"	2006	II Squad, Roc Vegas, Eddie K.	The Finest
"Ya'll Know"	2006	Blaze (Da Tyrant), Redragon	Reparationz 4a Dream
"If You a Gee"	2006	C-Bo, E.D.I.	Money to Burn
"Neva Forget"	2006	Messy Marv, E.D.I.	What You Know bout Me?
"Street Law"	2006	Messy Marv	Hustlan.A.I.R.E.
"Baby Don't Cry (Official 2006 Remix)"	2006	2Pac, Ciara, H.E.A.T.	—N/a
"Around Here"	2007	Begetz	Ghetto Pass
"Ain't No Thang"	2007	A-Wax, Stormey Coleman	Unconditional Thug
"More Than the Fame"	2007	Ony Oz	This Is Our Future
"Year of the Tiger"	2007	stic.man of Dead Prez	Manhood
"My Swag is Up"	2007	stic.man of Dead Prez	Manhood
"Ball or Fall"	2007	stic.man, King Malachi, Stormey Coleman, E.D.I., M-1	Manhood
"Gangsta Party Part 2"	2007	Daz Dillinger, Hussein Fatal	Gangsta Party
"Gods Plan"	2007	Hi-Tek, Young Buck, E.D.I.	Hi-Teknology 3
"Bis ich unter der Erde lieg"	2007	Eko Fresh, E.D.I.	Ekaveli
"Fillmoe 2 San Jo"	2007	DJ King Assassin, JT the Bigga Figga	United Playaz of the Bay
"Independent (Remix)"	2007	151, Juvenile, E.D.I., Skip	Power and Privilege
"Always Committed"	2007	Tito B, Daz Dillinger, E.D.I., Skip	Starz the Limit
"The Streets Got Our Kids"	2007	Patriarch, E.D.I.	Son of a Refugee
"West Coast Bounce"	2007	Mr. Stinky	Everything Dead
"Everybody Know Me"	2008	Guerilla Grind Inc.	T•DA•G
"Shine"	2008	Paypa Boiz	Street Newz Vol. 1
"This for My Niggaz"	2008	Gaf Pak, Scavenger Click	Out the Gates
"Shut Down"	2008	Tone	By Any Means Necessary
"Still Ridin'"	2008	Hogg Corps	Street Conceptions Vol. 1
"Get's What's Mine"	2008	C-Bo, Omar "Big-O" Gooding, E.D.I., Young Bleed	Tradin' War Stories
"Thug 4 Life"	2008	Crazy Lu, E.D.I.	The Gods Must Be Crazy
"Streets Are Callin"	2008	JenRO	The Revelation
"I'll Be Ur Pusher"	2009	Berner, LC	Weekend at Bernie's
"Taste of the Block"	2009	Onyz Oz, Mo Da Hustla & Mars (The Head Coach)	Stop Blindin' Me
"Holla My Name"	2009	Big Dee, Matty Bo	Realer Than Most
"Thuggin' 4 Life"	2009	Infamous-C, EDIDON, Kastro, Kyle Rifkin	V.I.P.
"The Anthem"	2009	DJ Outlaw, G.O.A.T, Jack Frost, Stormey Coleman	History in the Making
" A Call From Young Noble (of The Outlawz)"	2009	Erase-E	2nd Wind
"Lost Souls"	2010	Nutt-So & Hussein Fatal, E.D.I.	Outkasted Outlawz
"They Got Problems "	2010	Nutt-So & Hussein Fatal, E.D.I.	Outkasted Outlawz
"It Ain't Over"	2010	Sandy Solo	Coming to America
"Cleaned Off"	2010	Young Buck, C-Bo, E.D.I.DON, Hussein Fatal	Back on My Buck Shit Vol. 2: Change of Plans
"Feel'n Like Pac (D-Dosia Remix)"	2011	Philthy Rich, Richie Rich, Yukmouth	Trip'n 4 Life
"Rubber Band Stacks"	2011	Berner, Cozmo, Yukmouth	The White Album
"Da Process"	2011	Tony Atlanta	Shipping & Handling
"Keep Your Mouth off Reality"	2011	Mr. G Reality, EDIDON, Pettidee	Stronger than Ever
"Chirp Chirp"	2011	Young DOE a.k.a. Charles Truth	The Best Of...
"All My Respect"	2011	Nameless Kx, Hussein Fatal	Nameless Begins / Ends
"Girl Don't Give Up"	2011	Nameless Kx, Aktual	Nameless Begins / Ends
"Honor & Respect"	2011	Chorchyp, Stormey Coleman, EDIDON	Pot Samuraja
"Blowin' on Jamaica"	2012	Yukmouth, C-Bo	Half Baked
"Fucked Up World"	2012	Trae tha Truth, Z-Ro	Tha Blackprint
"Car Cloudy"	2012	Young Buck, EDIDON, Hussein Fatal	Live Loyal Die Rich
"Another Me"	2012	Marc Scratch, EDIDON	Another Me
"Lettin' Up"	2012	Marc Scratch	Another Me
"After the Rain"	2012	Marc Scratch	Another Me
"God's Children"	2012	Marc Scratch, Hussein Fatal	Another Me
"Born Outlaw"	2012	King Drago, Jay-B, Big Joe	Born in the Ghetto
"Dla tych prawdziwych"	2012	Toony, Mioush	S.Z.W.A.B.
"Party Ova Here"	2012	Aktual, Cyhi The Prynce, EDIDON, Maserati Rick	The Man Behind The Music
"Revolutionarily"	2012	The Brothahood	Mixtape 2.0
"Loyalty, Love, Gwop"	2012	Nameless Kx	#40DAYZ/40NITES
"Second Chance"	2012	Big D	Divine Genesis
"Cold World"	2012	Crazie Locs	Trying 2 Make It In These Streets
"Thuggin'"	2012	Fluid Outrage, E.D.I., Cinto	Back for the First Time
"Cost of Fame"	2012	The Mystro, Arabique, Timz	I'm Back
"Ready 4 Whatever"	2012	Bishop	Ready 4 Whatever
"I'm on It"	2012	Doug Crawford, Cursive, E.D.I.	Perseverance
"Gib Mir Ein Zeichen"	2012	Eko Fresh	Ek To The Roots
"Look At Me Now"	2012	Philthy Rich, J-Stalin, Killa Kyleon	Kill Zone The Leak
"From the Gutter"	2013	Hussein Fatal, 2Pac & Suicide Ru	The Interview: It's Not a Gimmik 2 Me
"Ronald Regan"	2013	Gonzoe	#ITRD (In Traffic Riding Dirty)
"Caught Up In The Struggle"	2013	Bossolo, Aloe Jo'el	Revival
"Domstadt"	2013	La Honda	Gorillas Im Nebel II
"Play Wit Your Life"	2013	Da Kid Akk, Hussein Fatal, Suicide Ru	Unfinished Business
"Dealin Wit The Pain"	2013	Da Kid Akk	Unfinished Business
"Tonite"	2013	EDIDON, Young Buck & Hussein Fatal	O.G. Est. 1992
"365 Grind"	2014	Struggle Da Preacher, A.K.-S.W.I.F.T.	Ups'n'Downs
"Born Targets"	2014	D.O.A.	—N/a
"Radio"	2014	AP.9	Bitch Killa
"Fly Away"	2014	EMRE2k, Hussein Fatal, S.K.Y.E.	Psykadelik Sydney
"Keep Moving"	2014	EMRE2k	Majestik
"Watch Out"	2014	Coptic, Stonebwoy	The Rising Stars Of GH Vol. III
"Fuck With Ya"	2015	C-Bo, Hussein Fatal	The Mobfather 2
"Freedom"	2015	Hussein Fatal	Ridin' All Week On 'Em
"This Is All I Know"	2015	Yadi Yas	I'm Focused
"Decisions"	2015	EDIDON, Freddie Gibbs, Krayzie Bone	The Hope Dealer, Pt. 1
"Plan Plot Strategize Execut"	2015	EDIDON & NUTT-SO	Ghetto Starz: Streets to the Stage
"Why Explain The Game?"	2016	F.D.T., Lil Mac, Hussein Fatal	Free Da Truth
"Ghetto Gospel"	2016	D-Loc The Gill God	Narcissistic: The God Complex
"OG Bobby Johnson"	2017	Legendary Boss	No Mercy
"The Ghetto"	2017	Yukmouth, TQ, Ampichino	JJ Based On A Vill Story
"Sixteen To A Hunid Clips"	2017	Gonzoe	Happy Birthday
"Drinks on Me"	2017	Swissivory, Tariah, N.O.R.E.	Real Dreams 2

== Music videos ==
List of music videos, with directors, showing year released
Title	Year	Director(s)
"Hail Mary" (2Pac featuring Outlawz)	1997	Frank Sacramento
"Baby Don't Cry (Keep Ya Head Up II)" (2Pac featuring Outlawz)	2000	J. Jesses Smith
"Black Rain" (Outlawz featuring Val Young)	2000	J. Jesses Smith
"Thug With me" (Outlawz)	2000	—N/a
"World Wide (Remix)" (2Pac featuring Outlawz)	2001	—N/a
"Thug Song" (Louie Loc featuring Yukmouth, Young Noble & Bad Azz)	2004	—N/a
"Runaway Slave" (stic.man of Dead Prez featuring Young Noble)	2006	James Wade & stic.man
"1 Nation" (Outlawz featuring Dead Prez)	2006	—N/a
"Fork in The Road" (Outlawz featuring King Malachi)	2006	James Wade, Cody Lucich & Young Noble
"Can't Tell Me Nuthin (Outlawz Remix)"	2008	James Wade & Young Noble
"Shine" (Paypa Boiz featuring Young Noble & MC Breed)	2008	James Wade & Young Noble
"We Want In / Hunger Pains" (Outlawz)	2008	James Wade & Young Noble
"Everything Happenz 4 a Reason" (Outlawz)	2008	James Wade & Young Noble
"Legendz in tha Game" (Outlawz)	2008	James Wade & Young Noble
"My Swag Is Up" (stic.man of Dead Prez featuring Young Noble)	2009	The Horne Brothers
"Wash Away" (Stormey Coleman featuring Young Noble & King Malachi)	2009	James Wade, Stormey Coleman & Young Noble
"Bad Enough" (Redzz featuring Shade Sheist, T.Q. & Young Noble)	2009	Danny Frenkel & Shade Sheist
"Sounds Like" (Outlawz)	2009	James Wade & Young Noble
"Honor & Respect" (Chorchyp featuring Outlawz)	2009	James Wade & Young Noble
"L.A to Copenhagen" (The Goodfellas featuring Outlawz)	2009	James Wade & Young Noble
"Gangstadam to L.A" (Gangstadam Mob featuring Outlawz)	2009	James Wade & Young Noble
"Revolutie (Remix)" (Kempi featuring Outlawz & DJ Smoke)	2009	James Wade & Young Noble
"Real Nigga Shit" (Goodfellas featuring Outlawz & Mike Raw)	2010	James Wade & Young Noble
"Great Grand Daddy Kush"	2010	James Wade & Young Noble
"Bring Em Back" (Outlawz featuring Big Mizz & Zayd Malik)	2010	James Wade & Young Noble
"Done It All" (Outlawz featuring Young Buck)	2010	Jordan Tower
"It Ain't Over" (Outlawz)	2010	Jordan Tower
"Face Down" (Outlawz featuring DJ XRated)	2010	Jordan Tower
"Count My Blessings" (Outlawz featuring The Jacka)	2010	Jordan Tower
"From The Bottom" (Outlawz)	2010	Jordan Tower
"Dream Big" (Outlawz)	2010	Jordan Tower
"Kush Dreams" (Outlawz featuring Freeway)	2010	Jordan Tower
"Letter 2 Pac" (Nino & Singa featuring Outlawz)	2010	—N/a
"Cooley High" (Outlawz featuring Tey Martel & Tony Atlanta)	2011	Iamhaym & Young Noble
"Brand New (Pimp C Dedication)" (Outlawz)	2011	Iamhaym & Young Noble
"Cocaine" (Outlawz featuring Aktual & Tony Atlanta)	2011	Iamhaym & Young Noble
"Back Again" (Outlawz)	2011	Iamhaym & Young Noble
"Spirit of an Outlaw" (Outlawz)	2011	Iamhaym & Young Noble
"Late Night Shift" (Outlawz featuring Tey Martel)	2011	Iamhaym & Young Noble
"2Pac Back G-Mix" (Outlawz)	2011	Iamhaym & Young Noble
"Bury The Hatchet" (DJ Kay Slay featuring Outlawz & Lil' Cease)	2011	Iamhaym & Young Noble
"Girl Don't Give Up" (Nameless Kx featuring Young Noble & Aktual)	2011	—N/a
"All My Respect" (Nameless Kx featuring Outlawz)	2011	—N/a
"Here To Stay (Remix)" (featuring Nameless Kx featuring Young Buck, Young Noble & Prentice)	2011	S. Osborne Films / FXT Assets Films
"Traficant Legal" (Bani Gheata featuring Young Noble)	2011	—N/a
"Paranoid" (Outlawz featuring Trae The Truth, Z-Ro & June Summers)	2011	Clearvision Productions & Young Noble
"Keep It Lit" (Outlawz)	2011	HusH Industrys
"The Streets" (Concrete Mob featuring Outlawz)	2012	Savvy So-Fly
"Bang Back" (Spittin Cobra featuring Outlawz)	2012	Sef Nait of IceLand Film
"Repent" (Tony Ray & Emmanual Praise featuring Young Noble)	2012	—N/a
"Revolutionarily" (The Brothahood featuring Young Noble)	2012	Jehad Dabab
"Cost of Fame" (The Mystro featuring Young Noble, Arabique & Timz)	2012	—N/a
"Fucked Up World" (Trae The Truth featuring Z-Ro & Young Noble)	2012	Jordan Tower
"Son of God"	2012	Jae Synth
"If They Kill Me"	2012	Savvy So-Fly
"Control My Destiny" (featuring Aktual)	2012	Jae Synth
"The Price"	2012	—N/a
"End of the World" (Nino featuring Young Noble)	2012	Syndrum Films
"Tha Game Has Changed" (featuring Deuce 22)	2013	Savvy So-Fly
"Hustlers Anthem" (Kray featuring Young Noble & Bizzy Bone)	2013	—N/a
"Welcome to Real Life" (featuring King Malachi, Arsonal Da Rebel, Hussein Fatal, Tony Atlanta & Krayzie Bone)	2013	James Wade
"Go Back" (featuring Deuce Deuce of Concrete Mob)	2013	Savvy So Fly
"Northern California" (featuring Gage Gully)	2013	Jae Synth
"Loyalty Don't Exist" (featuring Gage Gully)	2013	Jae Synth
"Fast Life / AmeriCanadian Dream" (featuring Deuce Deuce)	2013	Savvy So Fly
"Music Ease the Pain" (featuring Gage Gully)	2013	Jae Synth
"Curve Ball" (DJ Fresh featuring Mozzy, D Stax & Young Noble)	2013	Jae Synth
"My Way" (featuring Gage Gully, Yukmouth)	2013	Jae Synth
"Depend on Me" (featuring Deuce 22 & Kardinal Offishall)	2013	Savvy So Fly
"Never Snitch" (Tha Infamous $ featuring Young Noble)	2013	Jae Synth
"Underdogz" (featuring Gage Gully & Crooked I)	2013	—N/a
"Smoke Tha Pain Out" (featuring Rip The General)	2013	RemRod Films
"Topless" (featuring Gage Gully & Shawnna)	2013	Tha Razor
"Secrets of Life" (Marc Scratch featuring Young Noble)	2013	Jae Synth
"If U Want It (Go Get It)" (Marc Scratch featuring Young Noble)	2013	Jae Synth
"Money and Power" (Young Mike featuring Young Noble)	2013	Jae Synth
"Hustleholic" (featuring Gage Gully & Krayzie Bone)	2013	Tha Razor
