= Outlawz discography =

- Studio albums: 7
- Compilation albums: 4
- Singles: 10
- Music videos: 28
- Collaborative albums: 1
- Mixtapes: 10+

This is the discography of Outlawz, an American hip-hop group.

== Albums ==
=== Studio albums ===
Title	Album details	Peak chart positions	
Title	Album details	US	US R&B
Ride wit Us or Collide wit Us	Released: November 7, 2000; Label: Outlaw, Bayside; Format: CD, digital download	95	16
Novakane	Released: October 23, 2001; Label: Outlaw, Koch; Format: CD, digital download	100	24
Neva Surrenda	Released: October 22, 2002; Label: Outlaw, Rap-A-Lot; Format: CD, digital download	—	80
Outlaw 4 Life: 2005 A.P.	Released: April 19, 2005; Label: One Nation, 33rd Street; Format: CD, digital download	—	44
Retribution: The Lost Album	Released: 2006; Label: Outlaw, Death Row; Format: CD, digital download	—	—
Perfect Timing	Released: September 13, 2011; Label: Krude, Fontana; Format: CD, digital download	—	—
#LastOnezLeft	Released: June 23, 2017; Label: Outlaw, Elder; Format: CD, digital download	—	—

=== Collaborative albums ===
Title	Album details	Peak chart positions	
Title	Album details	US	US R&B
Still I Rise (with 2Pac)	Released: December 21, 1999; Label: Interscope; Format: CD, digital download	6	2

=== Compilation albums ===
Title	Album details
The Lost Songs Vol. 1	Released: March 23, 2010; Label: Outlaw; Format: CD
The Lost Songs Vol. 2	Released: March 23, 2010; Label: Outlaw; Format: CD
The Lost Songs Vol. 3	Released: March 23, 2010; Label: Outlaw; Format: CD
One Nation	Released: September 20, 2021; Label: Outlaw, Dough Networkz; Format: CD

== Mixtapes ==
Title	Mixtape details
Outlaw Warriorz Vol. 1	Released: June 22, 2004; Label: Outlaw; Format: CD
Outlaw Culture: The Official Mixtape	Released: March 14, 2006; Label: Outlaw; Format: CD
Can't Sell Dope Forever (with Dead Prez)	Released: July 25, 2006; Label: Affluent; Format: CD
Can't Turn Back	Released: 2007; Label: One Nation; Format: CD
We Want In: The Street LP	Released: August 5, 2008; Label: One Nation, Gold Dust Media; Format: CD
The Best of 2Pac & Outlawz	Released: August 5, 2008; Label: One Nation; Format: CD
Outlaw Culture Vol. 1	Released: 2009; Label: One Nation; Format: CD
Outlaw Culture Vol. 2	Released: 2009; Label: One Nation; Format: CD
Outlaw Culture Vol. 3	Released: 2009; Label: One Nation; Format: CD
Cashville Takeover (with Young Buck, C-Bo and $o$a Da Plug)	Released: February 3, 2009; Label: Cashville; Format: CD
Killuminati 2K10	Released: October 31, 2010; Label: One Nation, Krude; Format: CD
Killuminati 2K11	Released: July 14, 2011; Label: One Nation, Krude; Format: CD
Warrior Music (with Young Buck)	Released: October 21, 2013; Label: One Nation, Cashville; Format: CD
Inspirational Thug Musik Chapter 1 (with Aktual)	Released: November 26, 2013; Label: One Nation; Format: CD
Livin' Legendz	Released: November 18, 2016; Label: Black Market; Format: CD

== Charted singles ==
List of charted singles, with selected chart positions
Title	Year	Peak chart positions		Album
Title	Year	AUS	NZ	Album
"World Wide" (Remix) (featuring 2Pac)	2001	36	26	Novakane

== Guest appearances ==
- 1996: "All bout U" (2Pac featuring: Nate Dogg, Outlawz, Snoop Doggy Dogg, Dru Down)
- 1996: "Bomb First (My Second Reply)" (Makaveli featuring: Outlawz)
- 1996: "Just Like Daddy" (Makaveli featuring: Outlawz)
- 1996: "Life of an Outlaw" (Makaveli featuring: Outlawz)
- 1996: "Hail Mary" (Makaveli featuring: Outlawz)
- 1996: "Tradin' War Stories" (2Pac featuring: Outlawz, C-Bo, CPO Boss Hogg)
- 1996: "Thug Passion" (2Pac featuring: Outlawz, Jewell, DJ Quik)
- 1996: "When We Ride" (2Pac featuring: Outlaw Immortalz)
- 1997: "Starin' at the World Through My Rear View" (2Pac featuring: Outlawz)
- 1997: "Made Niggaz" (Makaveli featuring: Outlawz)
- 1997: "What's Ya' Fantasy" (Daz Dillinger Featuring: The Outlawz)
- 1997: "Lost Souls" (2Pac featuring: Outlawz)
- 1997: "Ain't Died in Vain" (Rondo featuring: Outlawz)
- 1997: "Enemies with Me" (2Pac featuring: Outlawz)
- 1998: "Initiated" (Daz Dillinger featuring: 2Pac, Outlawz, Kurupt)
- 1998: "Serenade My Life" (Gonzoe featuring: Outlawz)
- 1998: "This Life of Mine" (Bad Azz featuring: Outlawz and Prince Ital Joe)
- 1998: "Do Yo' Thug Thang" (Yukmouth featuring: Outlawz)
- 1998: "Still Ballin'" (Yukmouth featuring: Outlawz)
- 1998: "All Bout You (Remix)" (2Pac featuring: Outlawz, Nate Dogg, Dru Down, YGD Tha' Top Dogg)
- 1999: "How You Want It" (Big Mike featuring: Outlawz)
- 1999: "Immortal 2K" (5th Ward Boyz featuring: Outlawz)
- 2000: "Gun Talk" (Willie D featuring: Spice 1, Outlawz)
- 2000: "Ride or Die" (Sean T featuring: Outlawz)
- 2001: "We Gone Ride" (Yukmouth featuring: Hussein Fatal, Outlawz)
- 2001: "Hate the Game" (Killa Tay featuring: Outlawz and Luni Calone)
- 2001: "Breathin'" (2Pac featuring: Outlawz)
- 2001: "All Out" (2Pac featuring: Outlawz)
- 2001: "M.O.B." (2Pac featuring: Outlawz)
- 2001: "World Wide Mob Figgaz" (2Pac featuring: Outlawz)
- 2001: "U Don't Have 2 Worry" (2Pac featuring: Outlawz)
- 2001: "LastOnesLeft" (2Pac featuring: Outlawz)
- 2001: "Runnin' On E" (2Pac featuring: Outlawz)
- 2001: "First 2 Bomb (Original)" (2Pac featuring Outlawz)
- 2001: "They Don't Give a Fuck About Us (Original Mix)" (2Pac featuring Outlawz)
- 2002: "Sick Thoughts" (Big Syke featuring: Outlawz)
- 2002: "Born a Soulja" (Kastro and E.D.I. featuring: Yukmouth, Hellraza, Outlawz)
- 2002: "Ball or Die" (Hellraza featuring: Outlawz)
- 2002: "What U No Bout" (C-Bo featuring: Outlawz)
- 2002: "Turn da Heat Down" S(Spice 1 featuring: Outlawz)
- 2002: "Fuck Em All" (2Pac featuring: Outlawz)
- 2002: "Never B Peace" (2Pac featuring: Outlawz)
- 2002: "Whatcha Gonna Do" (2Pac featuring: Outlawz)
- 2002: "Late Night" (2Pac featuring: Outlawz and DJ Quik)
- 2002: "Fame" 2Pac featuring: Outlawz)
- 2002: "Catchin' Feelins" (2Pac featuring: Outlawz)
- 2002: "There U Go" (2Pac featuring: Outlawz and Big Syke)
- 2002: "This Life I Lead" (2Pac featuring: Outlawz)
- 2002: "They Don't Give a Fuck About Us" (2Pac featuring: Outlawz)
- 2003: "Ridin' for Pac" (Bullys wit Fullys featuring: Outlawz)
- 2003: "Hail Mary (Nu-Mixx)" (2Pac featuring: Outlawz and Prince Ital Joe)
- 2003: "Hit 'Em Up (Nu-Mixx)" (2Pac featuring: Outlawz)
- 2003: "One Day at a Time (Em's Version)" (2Pac and Eminem featuring: Outlawz)
- 2004: "The Uppercut" (2Pac featuring: Outlawz)
- 2004: "Black Cotton" (2Pac featuring: Outlawz, Eminem)
- 2004: "Where Will I Be" (Yaki Kadafi featuring: 2Pac and The Outlawz)
- 2004: "Neva' Can Say" (Yaki Kadafi featuring: The Outlawz)
- 2005: "Way Too Many" (Layzie Bone featuring: Outlawz)
- 2005: "Complicated" (Bone Brothers featuring: Outlawz)
- 2006: "Outlaws" (Belo Zero featuring: Outlawz)
- 2006: "Don't Stop" (2Pac featuring: Outlawz)
- 2007: "Bis ich unter der Erde lieg" ("Until I Lie Under The Earth") (Eko Fresh featuring: Outlawz)
- 2007: "Revolutie" (Kempi featuring: Outlawz)
- 2007: "Hail Mary (Rock Remix)" (2Pac featuring: Outlawz)
- 2007: "Got My Mind Made Up (Nu-Mixx)" (2Pac featuring: Outlawz and Kurupt)
- 2007: "Lost Souls (Nu-Mixx)" (2Pac featuring: Outlawz)
- 2007: "Picture Me Rollin' (Nu-Mixx) (2Pac featuring: Outlawz)
- 2008: "Cashville County" (Young Buck featuring: C-Bo, Outlawz)
- 2008: "Money Made Me Crazy" (Young Buck featuring: C-Bo, Outlawz)
- 2008: "They Fucks with Me" (Young Buck featuring: Sosa da Plug, Outlawz)
- 2009: "Fly" (Young Buck featuring: Sosa Tha Plug, Outlawz)
- 2009: "Ca$h-ville" (Cashis featuring: Young Buck, C-Bo, Sosa fa Plug, Outlawz)
- 2009: "Thug Life" (Al Massiva featuring: Outlawz)
- 2009: "Thuggin' 4 Life" (Infamous-C featuring: Outlawz and Kyle Rifkin)
- 2010: "Cleaned Off" (Young Buck featuring: Outlawz)
- 2012: "Can't Break Me" (C-Bo featuring: Outlawz) off Cali Connection
- 2012: "Son Of God" (Outlawz) off Strictly 4 Traps N Trunks 44: Free Young Buck Edition
- 2012: "What It Do" (Young Buck featuring: Sosa Tha Plug and Outlawz) off Welcome 2 Cashville
- 2013: "Betta Pray" (Da Mafia 6ix featuring: Outlawz and Lil Wyte)
- 2014-2017: "My Brother Keeper" (DJ Kay Slay featuring The Outlawz and Onyx) off The Last Hip Hop Disciple
- 2014-2017: "Shut Em Down" (MC Eiht featuring Outlawz) off Which Way Iz West
- 2017: "O4L" (Albanian Outlawz featuring Outlawz)

List of non-single guest appearances, with all performing artists, showing year released and album name
Title	Year	Other performer(s)	Group performers	Album
"Hard Labor"	1998	C-Bo, Big Lurch	Kastro, Young Noble, Napoleon, Storm	Til My Casket Drops
"MFC Lawz"	1998	Heltah Skeltah, Doc Holiday	Young Noble, Storm, Napoleon	Magnum Force
Jack Move	1998	Tha Dogg Pound	Big Syke, Yaki Kadafi, Napoleon, Hussein Fatal	Westside Riderz, Vol. 1
"I Don't Fuck with You"	1998	Willie D, Scarface, Gotti, DMG	Edidon, Napoleon, Young Noble, Kastro	Da Good da Bad & da Ugly
"Gun in My Mouth"	1998	Scarface	Young Noble, Napoleon, Edidon	Da Good da Bad & da Ugly
"Ain't Yo Average"	1999	None	Young Noble, Napoleon, Edidon, Kastro	Black Roses
"Hail of Bullets"	1999	Spice 1	Storm, Napoleon	Black Roses
"Thuggin' It Out"	2000	Do Or Die	Young Noble, Edidon	Victory
"Thug Warz"	2001	Fredro Starr, Sticky Fingaz	Napoleon, Edidon	Firestarr
"Turn the Heat Down"	2001	Spice 1	Edidon, Napoleon, Young Noble	Legends, Gangsters & Bosses
"Feel Your Pain"	2001	Benzino	Napoleon, Young Noble, Kastro, Edidon	The Benzino Project
"What U No Bout"	2002	C-Bo	Young Noble, Napoleon, Edidon	Life as a Rider
"What You Wish for"	2002	MC Eiht	Napoleon, Young Noble	Underground Hero
"United Ghettos of America"	2002	MC Eiht, C-Bo, Cold 187um, Mad Lion, Yukmouth	Young Noble, Napoleon	United Ghettos of America
"Neva Forget"	2006	Messy Marv	Young Noble, Edidon	What You Know Bout Me?
"Car Cloudy"	2012	Young Buck	Edidon, Hussein Fatal, Young Noble	Live Loyal Die Rich

== Music videos ==
List of music videos, with directors, showing year released
Title	Year	Director(s)
"Baby Don't Cry (Keep Ya Head Up II)" (2Pac featuring Outlawz)	2000	J. Jesses Smith
"Black Rain" (featuring Val Young)	2000	J. Jesses Smith
"Thug With Me"	2000	J. Jesses Smith
"World Wide (Remix)" (2Pac featuring Outlawz)	2001	—N/a
"1 Nation" (featuring Dead Prez)	2006	—N/a
"Fork in the Road" (featuring King Malachi)	2006	James Wade, Cody Lucich and Young Noble
"We Want In / Hunger Pains"	2008	James Wade and Young Noble
"Everything Happenz 4 a Reason"	2008	James Wade and Young Noble
"Legendz in tha Game"	2008	James Wade and Young Noble
"Sounds Like"	2009	James Wade and Young Noble
"Bring Em Back" (featuring Big Mizz and Zayd Malik)	2010	James Wade and Young Noble
"Seen It All" (featuring Young Buck)	2010	Jordan Tower
"It Ain't Over"	2010	Jordan Tower
"Face Down" (featuring DJ Xrated)	2010	Jordan Tower
"Count My Blessings" (featuring The Jacka)	2010	Jordan Tower
"From the Bottom"	2010	Jordan Tower
"Dream Big"	2010	Jordan Tower
"Kush Dreams" (featuring Freeway)	2010	Jordan Tower
"Cooley High" (featuring Tey Martel and Tony Atlanta)	2011	Iamhaym and Young Noble
"Brand New (Pimp C Dedication)"	2011	Iamhaym and Young Noble
"Cocaine" (featuring Aktual and Tony Atlanta)	2011	Iamhaym and Young Noble
"Back Again"	2011	Iamhaym and Young Noble
"Spirit of an Outlaw"	2011	Iamhaym and Young Noble
"Late Night Shift" (featuring Tey Martel)	2011	Iamhaym and Young Noble
"2Pac Back G-Mix"	2011	Iamhaym and Young Noble
"Bury the Hatchet" (DJ Kay Slay featuring Outlawz and Lil' Cease)	2011	Iamhaym and Young Noble
"Paranoid" (featuring Trae The Truth, Z-Ro and June Summers)	2011	Clearvision Productions and Young Noble
"Keep It Lit"	2011	HusH Industrys

=== As featured performer ===
List of music videos, with directors, showing year released
Title	Year	Director(s)
"Hit 'Em Up" (2Pac featuring Outlawz)	1996	J. Kevin Swain
"Hail Mary" (2Pac featuring Outlawz)	1997	Frank Sacramento
"Made Niggaz" (2Pac featuring Outlawz)	1997	Gobi Nejad
"Still Ballin" (Yukmouth featuring Outlawz)	1998	—N/a
"Ich bin ein Outlaw" (La Honda featuring Eko Fresh and Outlawz)	2007	—N/a
"Life's Hard" (Alter Egoz featuring Outlawz and Michaela Shiloh)	2008	James Wade
"L.A to Copenhagen" (The Goodfellas featuring Outlawz)	2009	James Wade
"Gangstadam to L.A" (Gangstadam Mob featuring Outlawz)	2009	James Wade
"Revolutie (Remix)" (Kempi featuring Outlawz and DJ Smoke)	2009	James Wade
"Real Nigga Shit" (Goodfellas featuring Outlawz and Mike Raw)	2010	James Wade
"Letter 2 Pac" (Nino & Singa featuring Outlawz)	2010	—N/a
"Thug Life" (Al Massiva featuring Outlawz)	2010	—N/a
"All My Respect" (Nameless Kx featuring Outlawz)	2011	—N/a
"The Streets" (Concrete Mob featuring Outlawz)	2012	Savvy So-Fly
"Bang Back" (Spittin Cobra featuring Outlawz)	2012	Sef Nait of IceLand Film
"Running All Night" (Aktual featuring Outlawz)	2012	Fredason
"Shut Em Down" (MC Eiht featuring Outlawz)	2014	Jae Synth
"O4L" (Albanian Outlawz featuring Outlawz)	2017	Niza

== See also ==
- Tupac Shakur discography
- Napoleon discography
- Hussein Fatal discography
- Young Noble discography
- Big Syke discography
- Mopreme Shakur discography
