= The Stash Spot =

Studio album by EDIDON
- Released: March 23, 2010
- Recorded: 1999–2009
- Genre: Gangsta rap
- Length: 49:38
- Label: Outlaw Recordz; 1 Nation Entertainment
- Producer: EDIDON (exec.)

EDIDON chronology
Doin' It Big (2008)	The Stash Spot (2010)	O.G. Est. 1992 (2013)

The Stash Spot is a digital album by rapper EDIDON of Outlawz, It was released on March 23, 2010.

== Track listing ==
No.	Title	Producer(s)	Length
1.	"Load Up"	EDIDON	3:16
2.	"Legends in tha Game" (featuring Young Noble & Hussein Fatal)		3:50
3.	"Bad Mutha" (featuring Cezus Walks, Kastro & Stormey Coleman)		3:50
4.	"She Don't Luv Me" (featuring Man Up & Young Noble)		4:26
5.	"No Where 2 Run" (featuring stic.man, Stormey Coleman & T-Mo)	EDIDON	3:18
6.	"G'z Up" (featuring Stormey Coleman, Young Noble & Zack)		4:43
7.	"Still Ridin'" (featuring Kastro, Young Noble, 8Ball & T-Mo)		3:59
8.	"Anyway" (featuring Kastro & T.I.)	Jazze Pha	3:40
9.	"Wonder Why?" (featuring Dirty Bert, Kastro, Napoleon & Young Noble)	Quimmy Quim	5:40
10.	"Swear to God" (featuring Petey Pablo, Young Noble & Kastro)		3:36
11.	"Attitude" (featuring Young Noble, Stormey Coleman & YoungBloodz)	Sean P.	4:35
12.	"Betta Get It" (featuring Young Noble, Trick Daddy, Stormey Coleman & Kastro)		4:45
