= Street Warz =

Compilation album by Young Noble & JT the Bigga Figga
- Released: October 22, 2002
- Recorded: 2000–2002
- Genre: West Coast hip hop; gangsta rap
- Length: 64:28
- Label: Outlaw Recordz; Get Low Recordz
- Producer: Al Beezy; Danger Zone Productions; DJ Premier; E.D.I.; Mike Dean; Quimmy Quim; Reefologist Da Street Criminalogist; Sean T; Track Addict

Young Noble chronology
Noble Justice (2002)	Street Warz (2002)	Thug Brothers (2006)

JT The Bigga Figga chronology
Hustle Relentless (2001)	Street Warz (2002)	Project Poetry (2003)

Street Warz is a compilation album by rappers Young Noble and JT the Bigga Figga, released October 22, 2002 on Outlaw Recordz and Get Low Recordz. The album was produced by the likes of DJ Premier, E.D.I., Mike Dean, Sean T, Al Beezy, Quimmy Quim, Reefologist Da Street Criminalogist, Danger Zone Productions, and Track Addict.

== Track listing ==
No.	Title	Producer(s)	Length
1.	"Street Wars" (Young Noble, Cozmo, JT the Bigga Figga)	Track Addict for Global Vibe	4:38
2.	"Too Hot" (Nas, 50 Cent, Nature)	DJ Premier	3:31
3.	"Lock Down" (Outlawz, Yukmouth, New Child, Phats Bossilini)	Quimmy Quim	4:35
4.	"First Things First" (Young Noble, JT the Bigga Figga, Double D)	Track Addict for Global Vibe	2:45
5.	"Money 2 Make" (Young Noble, JT the Bigga Figga, Double D, & Ed Bone)	Reefologist Da Street Criminalogist	3:31
6.	"Other Side of the Game 2" (San Quinn, JT the Bigga Figga, Authentic, & Ive Low)	Sean T for Dallas Squad	4:15
7.	"Smack Yo Self" (Young Noble, Hellraza, C-Bo)	Quimmy Quim	3:58
8.	"Lost Love" (Kastro & E.D.I.)	Mike Dean for Dean's List	3:34
9.	"Young Black & Crazy" (Black)	Danger Zone Productions	3:08
10.	"Get Money" (Daz Dillinger, JT the Bigga Figga, Al Beezy)	Al Beezy	4:15
11.	"Neva Been Done" (Baby Girl)	Quimmy Quim	3:35
12.	"Live My Life" (Jerzey Mob, Dirty Bert, Hommicide, Imperial S1, Lil D, Wack Deuce)	Reefologist Da Street Criminalogist	3:56
13.	"Lights Out" (Young Noble, EDI, Bad Azz, Lil' Zane)	EDI for We Got Kidz Productions	4:33
14.	"Part of Life" (Napoleon, Tripple 7)	EDI for We Got Kidz Productions	4:10
15.	"Feddy Eddy" (Reddy Redd, D-Moe & JT the Bigga Figga)	Sean T for Dallas Squad	2:28
16.	"The Main Event" (Tha Gamblaz, San Quinn, Seff The Gaffla, 567 Boyz, Ive Low, Budda Mack)	Track Addict for Global Vibe	7:37
