= Thug in Thug Out =

Studio album by Young Noble & Hussein Fatal
- Released: September 11, 2007
- Recorded: 2007
- Genre: Gangsta rap
- Length: 57:49
- Label: High Powered Entertainment; 1Nation Entertainment; Thugtertainment; Koch
- Producer: John Silva & A. Geiser (exec.); J. Silva; P. Silva; Cozmo

Young Noble chronology
Soldier 2 Soldier (2006)	Thug in Thug Out (2007)	All Eyez on Us (2008)

Hussein Fatal chronology
Fatal (2002)	Thug in Thug Out (2007)	Born Legendary (2009)

Thug in Thug Out is a collaborative studio album by American rappers Young Noble and Hussein Fatal from hip-hop group Outlawz, released September 11, 2007 on High Powered Entertainment and Koch Records.

== Track listing ==
No.	Title	Producer(s)	Length
1.	"Intro"	J. Silva	0:48
2.	"Hella Bars"	Cozmo	4:27
3.	"If I Die Tonight" (Guitar by Ian De Lile)	J. Silva	4:29
4.	"Gangsta Party, Pt. 2" (featuring Daz Dillinger)	J. Silva	3:26
5.	"Killa Kadaf"	J. Silva	4:02
6.	"Where Will I Go" (featuring E.D.I. & Matt Blaque)	Cozmo	4:13
7.	"Get It How I Get It"	J. Silva	3:54
8.	"Get Money Get Bent"	J. Silva	4:13
9.	"Streets Don't Change" (featuring Erin Thompkins & Francci, Guitar by Ian De Lile)	J. Silva	3:36
10.	"Can U Buy That?" (featuring C-Bo)	J. Silva	3:37
11.	"B*tches on My Left"	P. Silva	4:35
12.	"Outlawz 4 Life"	P. Silva	3:39
13.	"Stay on Top of Ur Game" (featuring Yukmouth)	J. Silva	4:01
14.	"Keepin' It G" (featuring Big Syke & G-Dub)	J. Silva	4:28
15.	"Turn Back da Clock" (featuring Kastro, Guitar by Ian De Lile)	J. Silva	3:47
16.	"Outro"	J. Silva	0:33

Notes

- Track 10 is misspelled as "Can U But That?" on all digital platforms and physical copies.
- Track 4 "Gangsta Party, Pt. 2" was also included on Daz Dillinger's 9th album Gangsta Party.
