= Powerful (Young Noble album) =

Studio album by Young Noble
- Released: September 13, 2016
- Recorded: 2015–2016
- Genre: Hip hop
- Length: 44:29
- Label: Outlaw Recordz; EMPIRE
- Producer: LR Beats; Outkastunforgiving; Boss DeVito; Edvin R; Snaz; Crazy T; Elite; Mike G

Young Noble chronology
The Code (2016)	Powerful (2016)	Thug Brothers 2 (2017)

Singles from Powerful
- 1. "Do It from tha Heart" Released: November 2, 2015

Powerful is the third studio album by American rapper Young Noble. It was released on September 13, 2016, through Outlaw Recordz. It features guest appearances from Hussein Fatal, Dirty Bert of Jerzey Mob, Mass tha Villain, Aktual, Deuce Deuce of Concrete Mob, stic.man of Dead Prez, EDIDON and Munch Ali.

== Track listing ==
No.	Title	Producer(s)	Length
1.	"Carry the Torch"	LR Beats	3:07
2.	"Do It from the Heart"	Outkastunforgiving	3:25
3.	"Dirty Game" (featuring Hussein Fatal)	Boss DeVito	3:31
4.	"The Last Outlaw"	Edvin R	3:19
5.	"Peace of Mind" (featuring Aktual)	Snaz	4:59
6.	"Living for Today" (featuring Dirty Bert, Mass tha Villain & Aktual)	Crazy T	4:03
7.	"Ambition" (featuring EDIDON)	Elite	4:15
8.	"Turn Down" (featuring Deuce Deuce & stic.man)	Crazy T	4:17
9.	"Free Your Mind"	Mike G	5:15
10.	"Where Do We Go" (featuring Hussein Fatal)	Boss Devito	3:30
11.	"Jah Bless" (featuring EDIDON & Munch Ali)	Crazy T	3:57
12.	"Powerful"	Boss DeVito	1:50
