= O.G. Est. 1992 =

Mixtape by EDIDON
- Released: May 21, 2013
- Recorded: 2012–2013
- Genre: Gangsta rap
- Length: 53:51
- Label: O4L Digital; Hoodrich Entertainment
- Producer: EDIDON (exec.)

EDIDON chronology
The Stash Spot (2010)	O.G. Est. 1992 (2013)	The Hope Dealer, Pt. 1 (2015)

Singles from No Lights On
- 1. "No Lights On" Released: March 12, 2013

O.G. Est. 1992 is a mixtape by rapper EDIDON of Outlawz. It was released on May 21, 2013, through O4L Digital & Hoodrich Entertainment.

== Track listing ==
No.	Title	Producer(s)	Length
1.	"Thug Life 2013" (featuring Hard)	Dr. G, co-prod. Aktual & EDIDON	4:55
2.	"One Way or Another"	King of Beats	2:36
3.	"Do It Right" (featuring J. Ara)	Yankee Production	3:49
4.	"Slow Down" (featuring Aktual & Devapink)	Btrakk	4:22
5.	"Tonite" (featuring Young Buck, Hussein Fatal & Young Noble)	Drumma Boy	4:24
6.	"Gangsta" (featuring Vinny Wisco)	Jay-Gee	3:31
7.	"All the Way in It"	Btrakk	4:45
8.	"OGz Interlude"	EDIDON	3:16
9.	"Pac and Pimp (RIP)" (featuring Tony Atlanta & Z-Ro)	Keys	4:37
10.	"No Lights On" (featuring Red Coat da Poet & Stormey Coleman)	The Cratez	3:57
11.	"So Cool"	Beatfanatics	3:27
12.	"Town2Town"	Vinny Idol	2:26
13.	"It's Gon' Show"	Aktual & EDIDON	3:25
14.	"It's Over" (featuring Mellirose)	Scottzilla	4:20

Exclusive Bonus Track
No.	Title	Producer(s)	Length
15.	"Worldwide (OG Remix)" (featuring Makaveli, 8Ball, Pimp C & Lloyd)	EDIDON, co-prod. Shorty B.	3:48
