= Noble Justice =

Studio album by Young Noble
- Released: May 28, 2002
- Recorded: 2000–2002
- Genre: Gangsta rap
- Length: 1:17:29
- Labels: Outlaw Recordz; Bayside Entertainment
- Producers: E.D.I.; Ghazi; Lance Pierre; L.T. Hutton; MAK; Mil; Mike Dean; Mr. Lee; Reefologist The Street Criminologist; Sean T; Shorty B.

Young Noble chronology
Noble Justice (2002)	Street Warz (2002)

Noble Justice is the debut studio album by American rapper Young Noble, released on May 28, 2002.

== Track listing ==
No.	Title	Producer(s)	Length
1.	"Respect Ourz"	L.T. Hutton	3:53
2.	"God'z Handz"	Lance Pierre	4:20
3.	"Hate Me or Love Me"	Sean T	3:11
4.	"Gotz 2 Go" (featuring Hellraza, Napoleon & Hommicide)	L.T. Hutton	3:57
5.	"Noble Justice" (featuring Val Young)	E.D.I.	4:29
6.	"I Ride, U Ride"	Reefologist The Street Criminologist	3:42
7.	"Over Again" (featuring E.D.I.)	E.D.I.	3:15
8.	"Baby Mama" (featuring Ed Bone & Val Young)	Sean T	4:06
9.	"Get Back" (featuring E.D.I. & Napoleon)	L.T. Hutton	3:52
10.	"Dead or Alive"	Mike Dean	3:50
11.	"Raised as 1" (featuring Dirty Bert, Lil' D & Hellraza)	Shorty B.	3:55
12.	"Time'z Up" (featuring The Game)	Ghazi	3:39
13.	"Gatz Up" (featuring E.D.I. & Napoleon)	Mr. Lee	4:42
14.	"Don't Know" (featuring Nutt-So)	MAK	4:05
15.	"Your World" (featuring Baby Girl)	E.D.I.	2:48
16.	"Get Low Outlawz" (featuring D-Moe, Double D, JT the Bigga Figga & Telly Mac)	Sean T	4:15
17.	"Enough 2 Make" (featuring E.D.I., Kastro & Napoleon)	Mr. Lee	4:43
18.	"Don't Cry" (featuring E.D.I. & Napoleon)	Mil	5:26
19.	"Lightz Out" (featuring E.D.I., Yukmouth, Lil Zane & Bad Azz)	E.D.I.	5:12
