= Big Syke =

American rapper

Background information
- Also known as: Syke; Mussolini; Little Psycho
- Born: Tyruss Gerald Himes; November 22, 1968; Inglewood, California, U.S.
- Died: December 5, 2016 (aged 48) Hawthorne, California, U.S.
- Genres: Hip hop
- Occupation: Rapper
- Years active: 1990–2016
- Labels: Interscope; Treacherous; Death Row; RideOnUm
- Formerly of: Thug Life; Outlawz

Tyruss Gerald Himes (November 22, 1968 – December 5, 2016), better known by his stage names Big Syke and Mussolini, was an American rapper best known for his work with the American hip-hop groups Thug Life and Outlawz. His stage name "Big Syke" is a revision of his childhood nickname "Little Psycho". He died at his home in Hawthorne, California, on December 5, 2016.

== Career ==
Big Syke was born and raised in Inglewood, California. He was a member of the Imperial Village Crips in Inglewood, California. In 1990, Big Syke and fellow rappers Domino and Mental Illness started a hip-hop group named Evil Mind Gangstas. In 1992, he met rapper Tupac "2Pac" Shakur and joined 2Pac's rap group Thug Life. In 1995, he joined 2Pac's second rap group, The Outlaw Immortalz, as Mussolini and recorded songs for 2Pac's 1996 album All Eyez on Me, including "Picture Me Rollin'", "When We Ride", "All Eyez On Me", and "Check Out Time".

=== Defamation suit ===
On January 19, 2007, Big Syke, a friend of Shakur who was implicated in the murder of The Notorious B.I.G. by the Los Angeles Fox affiliate KTTV and XXL magazine in 2005, brought a defamation lawsuit regarding the accusations.

== Death ==
Big Syke died at his home in Hawthorne, California, on December 5, 2016, at the age of 48 from natural causes, having had a history of heart issues and obesity. He was interred at Inglewood Park Cemetery.

== Discography ==
=== Studio albums ===
- Be Yo' Self (October 15, 1996, Parole / RideOnUm Records)
- Big Syke Daddy (September 25, 2001, D3 Entertainment / RideOnUm Records)
- Street Commando (May 21, 2002, Riviera / RideOnUm Records)
- Big Syke (October 22, 2002, Rap-a-Lot / RideOnUm Records)

=== Collaboration albums ===
- With Evil Mind Gangsta's - All Hell Breakin' Loose (1992, Organize Records)
- With Thug Life - Thug Life Vol. 1 (September 26, 1994, Out Da Gutta / Interscope)
- With 2Pac+Outlawz - Still I Rise

=== Compilation albums ===
- Thug Law: Thug Life Outlawz Chapter 1 (October 23, 2001, D3 Entertainment / RideOnUm Records)
- Thug Law: Thug Life Outlawz Chapter 2 (September 2, 2003, RideOnUm Records)

=== Mixtapes ===
- Thug Life: Demo Tape (with Thug Life) (1994, Interscope)
- Big Syke: Volume 1 (July 27, 2007, Ghost Label)
- Big Syke: Reincarnated Volume 1 (2007, Self-released)

=== Guest appearances ===
List of non-single guest appearances, with other performing artists, showing year released and album name thug life was also another album
Title	Year	Artist(s)	Album
"Say Whatcha Gotta Say"	1994	Johnny "J", Y?N-Vee	I Gotta Be Me
"All Eyez On Me"	1996	2Pac	All Eyez on Me
"Check Out Time"	1996	2Pac, Kurupt	All Eyez on Me
"Picture Me Rollin'"	1996	2Pac, Danny Boy, C.P.O.	All Eyez on Me
"When We Ride"	1996	2Pac, Yaki Kadafi, Hussein Fatal, Napoleon, Kastro, Mopreme Shakur, E.D.I.	All Eyez on Me
"Forever Ballin'"	1996	Johnny "J"	The Fan
"Ready 4 Whatever"	1997	2Pac	R U Still Down? (Remember Me)
"I'm Losin It"	1997	2Pac, Spice 1	R U Still Down? (Remember Me)
"510.213"	1997	Spice 1, WC	The Black Bossalini
"Mista Mista Dopeman"	1997	Khayree, Confident One	The Blackalation
"Pass Days"	1997	Khayree	The Blackalation
"Hittin' Cornaz"	1997	DJ Ripley	Lowrider 10: Ghetto Politix
"Raised In Hell"	1998	C-Bo	Til My Casket Drops
"Lifestyles of a G"	1998	Knight Owl	Wicked West
"Sexy Girl"	1998	Nate Dogg	G-Funk Classics, Vol. 1 & 2
"Jack Move"	1998	Daz Dillinger, Kadafi, Napoleon, Hussein Fatal, Kurupt	Westside Riderz Vol. 1
"Letter to the President"	1999	2Pac, Outlawz	Still I Rise
"All the Same"	1999	5th Ward Boyz, Kuirsham	P.W.A.: The Album... Keep It Poppin'
"Deep n the Game"	1999	B-Legit, Smilee G., Mac Shawn	Cross Country Riiidahz
"Thug Thang"	2000	Little Bruce, Mopreme Shakur, Kastro	Give It to Me Baby!
"Rize"	2001	Outlawz	Novakane
"Good Life"	2001	2Pac, E.D.I.	Until the End of Time
Interlude	2001	—N/a	Until the End of Time
"M.O.B."	2001	2Pac, Hussein Fatal, Mopreme Shakur, Yaki Kadafi	Until the End of Time
"I Rock the Gangsta Shit"	2001	Knight Owl	Bald Headed Kingpin
"Please Believe It"	2001	Jerzey Mob, Nutt-So, Outlawz	Jerzey Mob Vol. 1
"There U Go"	2002	2Pac, Kastro, Kadafi, Young Noble, Jazze Pha	Better Dayz
"It Is What It Is"	2002	Kastro & E.D.I., Wack Deuce	Blood Brothers
"Dogged Out"	2002	Ol' Dirty Bastard, Too Short	The Trials and Tribulations of Russell Jones
"Stick 2 the Plan"	2002	Outlawz	Neva Surrenda
"Pleasure of Sin"	2002	Outlawz, Yukmouth	Neva Surrenda
"Nigga Wake Up"	2002	Mac Mall	Mackin Speaks Louder Than Words
"Killa Cali"	2002	Bad Azz	The Best Kept Secretz, Vol. 1
"Seven Digits"	2003	Cold Blue, Lord G	Premeditated
"I'm the Shit"	2003	Vader	Screwed Up Texas Presents: Knock, Vol. 1
"Loyal to the Game (DJ Quik Remix)"	2004	2Pac, DJ Quik	Loyal to the Game
"Lately"	2004	Knight Owl, Jayo Felony, Slush The Villain	The Ghetto Bird
"Respect Mine"	2004	Gangsta Nutt, G-Money	Checkmate
"City of Rain"	2004	Gangsta Nutt, G-Money	Checkmate
"Movin' On"	2005	Bigg Steele	Size Duz Matter
"Life of Sin"	2005	Seattle's First Family	The Prophecy
"Don't Stop"	2006	2Pac, Young Noble, Kadafi, Stormey Coleman, Hussein Fatal, EDIDON	Pac's Life
"All Eyes on Us"	2006	Spider Loc	Bangadoshish
"City of Angels"	2006	Mr. Trippalot, Dinero	Los Angeles Gangsters
"Everyday Iz a Struggle"	2007	Macadoshis, Mopreme Shakur, G-Money	Tha Come Up
"Keepin' It G"	2007	Young Noble & Hussein Fatal, G-Dub	Thug in Thug Out
"Haven't Seen U Smile"	2008	Imaan Faith, Mopreme Shakur	Let The Truth Be Told
"Killaz From Tha West"	2008	DJ AK, Big Prodeje	Killaz From Tha West
"Pourin' Liquor"	2009	Jediah, E.D.I.	Outlaw Culture Vol. 1
"Killaz From Tha West (Remix)"	2009	DJ AK, Big Prodeje	E.Sides and Unreleased
"Thug Life"	2009	Jediah, Young Noble	Outlaw Culture Vol. 2
"Streets Are Watching"	2010	Snapper, Royal T	The Connect 3: The Streets Are Watching
"Activated"	2010	Bossolo	Notorious B.O.S.S.: The Rebirth
"Cloudy Days"	2010	Bossolo	Notorious B.O.S.S.: The Rebirth
"Reactivated"	2010	Bossolo, Spice 1, Daz Dillinger	Notorious B.O.S.S.: The Rebirth
"Boss Playaz Play"	2012	DJ AK	Gangsta Zone Party
"Inglewood 2 Da I"	2015	Bossolo & Spice 1	Thug Therapy
