= Thug Brothers =

Studio album by Layzie Bone and Young Noble
- Released: February 7, 2006
- Recorded: 2005–06
- Genre: Gangsta rap
- Length: 48:39
- Label: Real Talk Entertainment
- Producer: Derrick "Sac" Johnson (also exec.); Big Hollis; Mike Mosley; Tron Treez

Layzie Bone chronology
Bone Brothers (2005)	Thug Brothers (2006)	The New Revolution (2006)

Young Noble chronology
Street Warz (2002)	Thug Brothers (2006)	Against All Oddz (2006)

Professional ratings
Review scores
Source	Rating
AllMusic	3/5 stars
RapReviews	7/10

Thug Brothers is a collaborative studio album by American rappers Layzie Bone of Bone Thugs-n-Harmony and Young Noble of the Outlawz. It was released on February 7, 2006 via Real Talk Entertainment. A sequel album Thug Brothers 2 was released in 2017 which is a collaborative effort by Krayzie Bone and Young Noble, Krazie Bone picks up where Layzie Bone left off.

== Track listing ==
No.	Title	Producer(s)	Length
1.	"Stand Up" (Intro)	Big Hollis	1:14
2.	"Put Me in a Cell"	Big Hollis	4:21
3.	"Stay on the Grind"	Big Hollis	4:45
4.	"What the Problem Is"	Big Hollis	4:53
5.	"Money First" (interpolation from the movie Scarface)	Derrick "Sac" Johnson	0:10
6.	"Young Soldier"	Mike Mosley	4:36
7.	"We Can Get It On"	Big Hollis	4:32
8.	"Thats the Shit"	Big Hollis	4:34
9.	"Man Up"	Tron Treez	4:48
10.	"Then Your Gone"	Big Hollis	3:55
11.	"I Got Cha'"	Mike Mosley	4:17
12.	"Be a Gangsta" (interpolation from the movie GoodFellas)	Derrick "Sac" Johnson	0:08
13.	"The Legacy Continues"	Big Hollis	4:01
14.	"Thug Brothers" (Outro)	Big Hollis	2:25
Total length:			48:39

== Charts ==
Chart (2006)	Peak position
US Top R&B/Hip-Hop Albums (Billboard)	90
US Independent Albums (Billboard)	30
