= Thug Brothers 2 =

Studio album by Krayzie Bone & Young Noble
- Released: June 16, 2017
- Recorded: 2016–2017
- Genre: Hip hop
- Length: 38:44
- Label: Real Talk Entertainment

Krayzie Bone & Young Noble chronology
Thug Brothers 2 (2017)	Thug Brothers 3 (2017)

Krayzie Bone chronology
Chasing the Devil: Temptation (2015)	Thug Brothers 2 (2017)	Eternal Legend (2017)

Young Noble chronology
Powerful (2016)	Thug Brothers 2 (2017)	Thug Brothers 3 (2017)

Singles from Thug Brothers 2
- 1. "Rolling Stone" Released: May 19, 2017

Thug Brothers 2 is a collaborative studio album by rappers Krayzie Bone of Bone Thugs-n-Harmony & Young Noble of Outlawz. It was released on June 16, 2017 on Real Talk Entertainment. The first Thug Brothers album released in 2006, was a collaborative effort by Layzie Bone and Young Noble, but for the sequel, Krayzie Bone picks up where Layzie Bone left off. A sequel album Thug Brothers 3 was released the same year on October 6, 2017.

== Track listing ==
No.	Title	Length
1.	"Apparently"	3:34
2.	"Nothing Matters"	4:03
3.	"Right or Wrong"	3:10
4.	"Rolling Stone"	5:00
5.	"Both Worlds" (featuring Tupac)	2:34
6.	"Heavenly Father"	4:18
7.	"Not the 1"	4:08
8.	"Criminal Tactics"	0:35
9.	"Follow Me"	3:42
10.	"Angels"	3:04
11.	"It's Hard to Let Go"	0:58
12.	"What I'm Going Through"	4:00
