= The Game Has Changed =

The Game Has Changed may refer to:

- "The Game Has Changed" (song), a 2010 song by Daft Punk from the Tron: Legacy soundtrack
- "The Game Has Changed" (Battle for Dream Island), a 2020 web series episode
- "The Game Has Changed", a 2025 episode of Extracted (TV series)
- "The Game Has Changed Part 1" and "Part 2", two 2024 episodes of Full Swing (2023 TV series)
- "Tha Game Has Changed", a 2012 song by Young Noble from Son of God (album)
- Bazi ʿAvaz Shodeh (The Game Has Changed), a 2011 album by Alireza Assar
