= Baby Don't Cry (Keep Ya Head Up II) =

1999 single by 2Pac and Outlawz

Single by 2Pac and Outlawz featuring H.E.A.T.

from the album Still I Rise
- Released: October 28, 1999
- Recorded: April 29, 1996; 1998–1999
- Genre: Hip-hop; R&B
- Length: 4:22
- Label: Death Row; Interscope
- Songwriters: Tupac Shakur; Malcolm Greenidge; Rufus Cooper; Carsten Schack; Kenneth Karlin
- Producers: 2Pac; Soulshock and Karlin

2Pac singles chronology
"Unconditional Love" (1999)	"Baby Don't Cry (Keep Ya Head Up II)" (1999)	"Who Do U Believe In" (1999)

Music video
- “Baby Don't Cry (Keep Ya Head Up II)” on YouTube

"Baby Don't Cry (Keep Ya Head Up II)" is a song by 2Pac and Outlawz from the album Still I Rise. It features pop band H.E.A.T. It charted at number 72 on the Billboard Hot 100.

== Music video ==
The video made for the song was shot during September 1–3, 1999, and is the only song from the album to have a music video. The song shows the Outlawz performing and features footage of "Keep Ya Head Up".

== Track listing ==
1. LP Version
2. Soulshock & Karlin Remix Dirty Version
3. Instrumental
4. Acappella

== Charts ==
Chart (2000)	Peak position
Germany (GfK)	25
Netherlands (Dutch Top 40)	22
Netherlands (Single Top 100)	22
New Zealand (Recorded Music NZ)	35
Switzerland (Schweizer Hitparade)	55
US Billboard Hot 100	72
US Hot R&B/Hip-Hop Songs (Billboard)	36
