= 2K11 (disambiguation) =

2K11 may refer to:

- the year 2011
- 2K11 Krug, Soviet and now Russian surface-to-air missile system
- Killuminati 2K11, 2011 mixtape by American hip-hop group Outlawz
- Major League Baseball 2K11, 2011 video game
- NBA 2K11, 2010 video game
- NHL 2K11, 2010 video game
