= Son of God (album) =

Studio album by Young Noble
- Released: November 12, 2012
- Recorded: 2012
- Genre: Hip hop
- Length: 59:59
- Label: Outlaw Recordz
- Producer: Young Noble (exec.); Scottzilla (also co-exec.); Elite Producers (also co-exec.); Snaz; Boss DeVito

Young Noble chronology
Noble Justice: The Lost Songs (2010)	Son of God (2012)	Fast Life (2013)

Singles from Son of God
- 1. "Son of God" Released: August 28, 2012

Son of God is the second studio album by American rapper Young Noble. It was released on November 12, 2012, through Outlaw Recordz.

== Background ==
After the release of the last Outlawz album Perfect Timing in 2011, Young Noble released two mixtapes Outlaw Rydahz Vol. 1 and Outlaw Nation before the release of this album.

== Singles ==
The album's self-titled single "Son of God" Produced by Boss DeVito was released on iTunes Store on August 28, 2012.

In commemoration of the passing and in honor of Tupac, Young Noble released a music video for the song, “Son of God” directed by Jae Synth on September 13, the day Tupac died.

== Track listing ==
No.	Title	Producer(s)	Length
1.	"Control Your Destiny" (featuring Aktual, co-wrote by Don Denali)	Scottzilla	5:12
2.	"The Price"	Snaz	3:00
3.	"Son of God"	Boss DeVito	3:18
4.	"Emancipation" (featuring Hussein Fatal & EDIDON)	Scottzilla	4:31
5.	"If They Kill Me"	Snaz	2:18
6.	"Count Me Out" (featuring Trae tha Truth, AKK & Aleah Paige)	Elite Producers	4:43
7.	"Dealin' wit tha Pain" (featuring Aka & AKK)	Elite Producers	3:55
8.	"Welcome to Real Life" (featuring Arsonal Da Rebel, Hussein Fatal, Tony Atlanta, Krayzie Bone & King Malachi)	Scottzilla	8:16
9.	"Amazing" (featuring Titus Tucker)	Elite Producers	3:43
10.	"Pretty Gurl" (featuring Aktual & Reyfonder)	Elite Producers	3:56
11.	"Today Iz My Day"	Elite Producers	3:03
12.	"Tha Game Has Changed" (featuring Deuce Deuce)	Scottzilla	3:28
13.	"Start from Scratch" (featuring AKK & H-Ryda)	Scottzilla	4:00
14.	"Eazy Come Eazy Go" (featuring King Malachi)	Scottzilla	3:04
15.	"God Got My Back" (featuring Aktual & AKK)	Elite Producers	3:31
