= Novakane =

Studio album by Outlawz
- Released: October 23, 2001
- Recorded: 2000–2001
- Genre: Hip-hop
- Length: 56:44
- Labels: Outlaw; Koch
- Producers: Floss P; Joey Glasses; L.T. Hutton; Mack 4; Mike Dean; Muhammad "Madball" Bell; Poli Paul; Quimmy Quim; Reefologist; Shorty B

Outlawz chronology
Ride wit Us or Collide wit Us (2000)	Novakane (2001)	Neva Surrenda (2002)

Professional ratings
Review scores
Source	Rating
AllMusic	2.5/5 stars
HipHopDX	3/5
RapReviews	6/10

Novakane is the second studio album by American hip-hop group the Outlawz. It was released on October 23, 2001, through Outlaw Recordz with distribution via Koch Entertainment.

Production was handled by Reefologist Da Street Criminologist, L.T. Hutton, Floss P, Joey Glasses, Mack 4, Mike Dean, Muhammad "Madball" Bell, Poli Paul, Quimmy Quim and Shorty B. It features guest appearances from Ed Bone, Hellraza, Kamikaze, Seal and T-Low.

The album debuted at number 100 on the Billboard 200, number 24 on the Top R&B/Hip-Hop Albums and number 3 on the Independent Albums charts in the United States.

== Track listing ==
No.	Title	Writer(s)	Producer(s)	Length
1.	"Intro"			0:24
2.	"Rize"	Malcolm Greenidge; Mutah Beale; Rufus Cooper; Tyruss Himes; Katari Cox; K. Beale	Reefologist Da Street Criminologist	3:59
3.	"This Is the Life"	M. Beale; Greenidge; Cooper; Muhammad Bell; William Irving	Madball; Bill Blast (co.)	3:59
4.	"Ghetto Gutta"	Greenidge; Cox; Stuart Jordan	Shorty B.	3:54
5.	"Our Life"	M. Beale; Greenidge; Cooper; Cox; Paul Poli; S. Smith; L. Walker	Poli Paul	4:02
6.	"Y'all Can't Do"	M. Beale; Greenidge; Cooper; Cox; Lenton Hutton	L.T. Hutton	4:23
7.	"Interlude 1"			0:30
8.	"Red Bull & Vodka"	Cooper; M. Beale; Greenidge; Hutton	L.T. Hutton	3:24
9.	"2nd Hand Smoke"	Cooper; M. Beale; Cox; J. Worthy	Joey Glasses	4:50
10.	"Interlude 2"			1:08
11.	"Boxspring Boogie"	Cooper; Greenidge; Muntaquim Farid	Quimmy Quim	4:05
12.	"History"	Cooper; Greenidge; M. Beale; Cox; Henry Samuels; K. Beale	Reefologist Da Street Criminologist; Mikal Kamil (add.)	4:25
13.	"So Many Stories"	M. Beale; Cooper; Kamil Beale; Cox; Harold Moret	Floss P.	3:39
14.	"World Wide Remix"	Tupac Shakur; Greenidge; M. Beale; Cooper; Johnny Lee Jackson; James Reigart	DJ Felli Fel; Bosko (add.)	5:10
15.	"Die If U Wanna"	M. Beale; Michael Dean	Mike Dean	3:14
16.	"Interlude 3"			1:18
17.	"Loyalty"	Greenidge; M. Beale; Kamikaze; Cooper; Cox; Ed Bone	Mack 4	4:20
Total length:				56:44

Sample credits

- Track 17 contains resung elements from "The Message" written by Edward Fletcher, Sylvia Robinson, Melvin Glover and Clifton Chase.

== Personnel ==
- Malcolm "E.D.I. Mean" Greenidge – vocals, mixing (tracks: 4, 6, 8)
- Rufus "Young Noble" Cooper III – vocals
- Mutah "Napoleon" Beale – vocals
- Katari "Kastro" Cox – vocals
- Tyruss "Big Syke" Himes – vocals (track 2)
- Seal Henry Olusegun Olumide Adeola Samuel – vocals (track 12)
- Kamil "Hellraza" Beale – vocals (track 13)
- Tupac "2Pac" Shakur – vocals (track 14), executive producer
- Terrance "T-Low" Brown – vocals (track 14)
- Crysis – additional backing vocals (track 14)
- Bosko Kante – talkbox & additional producer (track 14)
- Kamikaze – vocals (track 17)
- Ed Bone – vocals (track 17)
- Mac Robinson – guitar (track 5)
- Hans Johansson – guitar (track 12)
- James "D.C." Wilson, III – keyboards (track 12)
- Valarie King – flute (track 12)
- Vonette Yama Quinuma – electric harp (track 12)
- Sebastian Aymanns – drums (track 12)
- Jimmy Jean-Louis – djembe (track 12)
- Dave "D-Wiz" Evelingham – guitar & mixing (track 14)
- Reefologist Da Street Criminologist – producer (tracks: 2, 12)
- Muhammad "Madball" Bell – producer & mixing (track 3)
- William "Bill Blast" Irving – co-producer & mixing (track 3)
- Stuart "Shorty B." Jordan – producer (track 4)
- Paul Poli – producer (track 5)
- Lenton "LT" Hutton – producer (tracks: 6, 8)
- Joey Glasses – producer (track 9)
- Muntaquim "Quimmy Quim" Farid – producer (track 11)
- Mikal Kamil – additional producer (track 12)
- Flossy P – producer & engineering (track 13)
- James "DJ Felli Fel" Reigart – remix producer & mixing (track 14)
- Mike Dean – producer (track 15)
- Mack 4 – producer (track 17)
- Lance Pierre – mixing (tracks: 2, 4, 6, 8, 9, 11, 13, 15, 17)
- William Lucas – engineering (tracks: 2–6, 8, 9, 11, 15, 17)
- Ryan Freeland – mixing (track 5)
- Marc Friedlander – engineering (track 14)
- Eddy Schreyer – mastering
- Yafeu Akiyele Fula – executive producer
- Dexter Browne – photography

== Charts ==
Chart (2001)	Peak position
UK R&B Albums (Official Charts)	38
UK Independent Albums (Official Charts)	28
US Billboard 200	100
US Top R&B/Hip-Hop Albums (Billboard)	24
US Independent Albums (Billboard)	3
