= Knightowl =

Mexican-born American rapper (1966–2022)

- Born: Ramon Corona; May 13, 1966; Tijuana, Baja California, Mexico
- Died: February 11, 2022 (aged 55) San Diego, California, U.S.
- Genres: Chicano rap, gangsta rap
- Occupations: Rapper; songwriter; businessman
- Years active: 1993–2022
- Label: Sawed Off Records

Knightowl (sometimes styled as Mr. Knightowl) (May 13, 1966 – February 11, 2022), born Ramon Corona, was a Mexican-born American rapper. He began recording in 1993. His fame came with the hit singles Daddy I'm In Love With a Gangsta and Here Comes The Knightowl.

== Career ==
Knightowl originally signed with Columbia Records, but quickly decided to start his own record label, calling it "Sawed Off Records." His own label gave him the artistic freedom to do what he wanted. His first artist he brought on board was Mr. Shadow.

In 1994, Eazy-E, founder of Ruthless Records and member of NWA was going to sign Knightowl, DJ Mikeski and Mr. Lil One from South San Diego as a weapon against DeathRow Records, Suge Knight and Dr. Dre. Due to the sudden death of Eazy-E, this did not happen.

Knightowl, one of the biggest names in Chicano rap, worked with prominent artists throughout his career: Big Syke, Daz Dillinger, Kid Frost, Eazy-E, Lil Rob, Mr Criminal, David Salas, and 2Pac in an unreleased track along with Big Syke and The Outlawz.

Knightowl raps in Caló (Chicano) and Spanglish, although English is the most prominent language in his raps. In 2000, Knightowl formed a duo with "Mr. Lil' One" for the Hollow-point collaborative venture, which released The Little & The Owl album. He was considered one of the California's top gangsta rappers. He changed his name to Mr. Knightowl in 2004.

== Personal life ==
Knightowl died from complications of COVID-19 on February 11, 2022.

== Discography ==
- The Knightowl - 1995
- Wicked West - 1998
- Shot Caller - 1999
- Hollowpoint (With Mr. Lil One) - 2000
- Knightmares - 2000
- Bald Headed Kingpin - 2001
- Knightowl Presents The Untouchables - 2002
- Most Requested - 2002
- Mr. Knightowl Presents Episode 13 - 2002
- 619 HoodLumz - 2003
- Mr. Knightowl Presents Out The Birds Nest - 2003
- Ghetto Bird - 2004
- El Gran Pelon - 2004
- Mr. Knightowl Presents Only The Strong Survive - 2004
- Mr. Knightowl Presents Blue Rag Soldiers - 2005
- Jail Bird - 2005
- King Of The West - 2006
- Classics For The O.G.'s - 2007
- El Padrino De Las Calles - 2007
- No Regrets - 2007
- Mr. Knightowl Presents Armed & Dangerous - 2008
- Code Of Silence - 2008
- Mr. Knightowl Southside Affiliates - 2008
- Konvicted Felon - 2010
- El Pajaro Loko- 2012
- The Chronicles of Knight Owl - 2014
- Return of the Kingpin - 2017
- The Untouchable Owl Pacino - 2019
