= Killuminati 2K11 =

Mixtape by Outlawz
- Released: July 14, 2011
- Genre: Gangsta rap
- Length: 58 m. 36 s.
- Labels: 1Nation Entertainment; Ca$hville Records; Thugtertainment; Krude Production Inc.
- Producers: Outlawz (exec.); Aktual, Maxwell Smart, Scottzilla, MPire, J Remy, Lee Major Beats, Femi

Outlawz chronology
Killuminati 2K10 (2010)	Killuminati 2K11 (2011)	Perfect Timing (2011)

Killuminati 2K11 is a mixtape by American hip-hop group Outlawz hosted by DJ Smallz and DJ Kay Slay, released July 14, 2011 for free download. It serves as a sequel to their 2010 mixtape Killuminati 2K10.

== Track listing ==
No.	Title	Producer(s)	Length
1.	"One Way" (featuring Chamillionare)	Aktual	4:42
2.	"Brand New (Pimp C Dedication)"	Maxwell Smart	4:23
3.	"O4L"	Scotzilla	3:21
4.	"Blow My High" (featuring Trae The Truth & Young Buck)	MPire	4:33
5.	"Cocaine" (featuring Aktual & Tony Atlanta)	Aktual	4:41
6.	"Late Night Shift" (featuring Tey Martel)	J Remy	4:59
7.	"Back Again"	Lee Major Beats	3:02
8.	"Spirit of an Outlaw"	Scottzilla	4:35
9.	"Outlaw Culture" (featuring Kastro)	Maxwell Smart	4:02
10.	"Bounce"	Femi	4:30
11.	"Tha Corner" (featuring Lowkey)	Maxwell Smart	3:53
12.	"Dedication" (featuring Maserati Rick)	Femi	3:38
13.	"From the Bottom (Part 2)"	MPire	3:29
14.	"Tupac Back (G-Mix)" (featuring Rick Ross & 2Pac)		4:50

iTunes Store Edition Bonus Tracks
No.	Title	Producer(s)	Length
15.	"What Am I Supposed to Do"		3:38
16.	"Black Rose" (featuring Kastro)	Scottzilla	3:50
17.	"Workin' Girl" (featuring Aktual)	Aktual	4:35
18.	"Alright wit Me" (featuring Sky)		4:33

Notes

- Track 12 - "Dedication" (Released on original mixtape version as "Keep On")
- Track 14 - "2Pac Back (Outlaw G-Mix)" (Missing on the iTunes Release)
