= In the Line of Fire (Hussein Fatal album) =

Studio album by Fatal
- Released: March 24, 1998
- Recorded: 1997–98
- Studio: Platinum Island (New York City); The Hit Factory (New York City); Chung King (New York City); Jimmy Weaver
- Genre: Gangsta rap
- Length: 42:26
- Label: Relativity
- Producer: Courtney Burgess; Baby Paul; Buff William; D'Anthony Johnson; Darrell "Delite" Allamby; Femi Ojetunde; Quimmy Quim; Reef; Steve Pitts

Fatal chronology
In the Line of Fire (1998)	Fatal (2002)

Singles from In the Line of Fire
- 1. "Getto Star" Released: 1997; 2. "Everyday" Released: 1998

Professional ratings
Review scores
Source	Rating
AllMusic	4/5 stars
RapReviews	7/10
The Source	2.5/5 stars

In the Line of Fire is the debut solo studio album by American rapper Hussein Fatal. It released on March 24, 1998, via Relativity Records.

== Background ==
Recording sessions took place at Platinum Island Studios, The Hit Factory and Chung King Studios in New York, and at Jimmy Weaver Studio. Production was handled by Darrell "Delite" Allamby, Reef, Steve Pitts, Baby Paul, Buff William, D'Anthony Johnson, Femi Ojetunde, Quimmy Quim, and Courtney Burgess, who also served as executive producer together with Awanda Booth. It features guest appearances from Dirty Bert, Antoinette Roberson, Freddie Foxxx, Merciless X, Smooth and Tame One. The album peaked at number 50 on the Billboard 200 and number 10 on the Top R&B/Hip-Hop Albums. Two singles were released: "Getto Star" and "Everyday", with the latter reached number 79 on the Hot R&B/Hip-Hop Songs.

== Track listing ==
No.	Title	Writer(s)	Producer(s)	Length
1.	"Intro"	Bruce Washington	Courtney Burgess; Buff William	3:29
2.	"M.O.B." (featuring Freddie Foxxx)	Washington; James Campbell; D'Anthony Johnson	D'Anthony Johnson	4:06
3.	"Everyday" (featuring Antoinette Roberson)	Washington; Antoinette Roberson; Darrell Allamby	Darrell "Delite" Allamby	4:33
4.	"Friday" (featuring Dirty Bert and Smooth)	Washington; Muntaquim Farid	Quimmy Quim	5:06
5.	"I Know the Rules"	Washington; Rob Tewlow; Phillip Mitchell	Reef	4:19
6.	"Outlaws" (featuring Mac Mall and Merciless X)	Washington; Jamal Rocker; Paul Hendricks; Eugene McDaniels	Baby Paul	4:34
7.	"Time's Wastin'"	Washington; Steve Pitts	Steve Pitts	4:08
8.	"What's Your Life Worth?" (featuring Dirty Bert)	Washington; Allamby	Darrell "Delite" Allamby	4:00
9.	"Getto Star" (featuring Tame One)	Washington; Rahem Brown; Tewlow	Reef	3:59
10.	"Take Your Time"	Washington; Pitts; Sean Brown	Steve Pitts	3:35
11.	"The World Is Changing"	Washington; Femi Ojetunde	Femi Ojetunde	4:06
Total length:				42:26

Sample credits

- Track 5 contains elements from "A Star In The Ghetto" written by Phillip Mitchell and performed by Average White Band.
- Track 6 contains elements from "Feel Like Making Love" written by Gene McDaniels.

== Personnel ==
- Bruce "Hussein Fatal" Washington – main artist, sleeve notes
- James "Freddie Foxxx" Campbell – featured artist (track 2)
- Antoinette Roberson – featured artist (track 3)
- Dirty Bert – featured artist (tracks: 4, 8)
- Smooth – featured artist (track 4)
- Jamal "Mac Mall" Rocker – featured artist (track 6)
- Merciless X – featured artist (track 6)
- Rahem "Tame One" Brown – featured artist (track 9)
- Courtney Burgess – producer (track 1), executive producer, sleeve notes
- Buff William – producer (track 1)
- D'Anthony Johnson – producer (track 2)
- Darrell "Delite" Allamby – producer (tracks: 3, 8)
- Muntaquim "Quimmy Quim" Farid – producer (track 4)
- Rob "Reef" Tewlow – producer (tracks: 5, 9)
- Paul "Baby Paul" Hendricks – producer (track 6)
- Steve Pitts – producer (tracks: 7, 10)
- Femi Ojetunde – producer (track 11)
- Carl Nappa – mixing (tracks: 1, 3, 4, 6, 8)
- Troy Hightower – mixing (tracks: 2, 7, 10, 11)
- Ken "Duro" Ifill – mixing (tracks: 5, 9)
- Michael Sarsfield – mastering
- David Bett – creative director
- Awanda Booth – executive producer
- Daniel Hastings – photography

== Charts ==
Chart (1998)	Peak position
US Billboard 200	50
US Top R&B/Hip-Hop Albums (Billboard)	10
