= All Eyez on Me (Tupac Shakur song) =

1996 song by 2Pac featuring Big Syke

Song by 2Pac featuring Big Syke

from the album All Eyez on Me
- Released: February 13, 1996
- Recorded: October 30, 1995
- Genre: West Coast hip hop; gangsta rap
- Length: 5:07
- Label: Death Row; Interscope
- Songwriters: Tupac Shakur; Johnny Jackson; James Pennington
- Producer: Johnny "J"

"All Eyez on Me" is a song by American rapper 2Pac from his fourth studio album of the same name (1996). It features American rapper Big Syke. Produced by Johnny "J", the song contains a sample of "Never Gonna Stop" by Linda Clifford.

== Background ==
In a sample of an earlier interview, later published after his death by XXL in 2015, Johnny "J" talked about connecting with 2Pac on the track:

That was the very first track I laid when we got together at Death Row. When he just got out of jail, just got released, two days later he's like, "'J', get to the studio, I'm with Death Row now." I assumed it was a joke, somebody perpetrating Tupac. I'm like "Hell no – 'Pac is locked up!" He's like "J, I'm out" I walk in, 15 minutes into the session, the first beat I put in the drum machine is "All Eyez On Me." I wasn't going to show him the track, honestly. I was like, "This track? Nah, it's not finished. It's incomplete." My wife says, "Hey, it's a dope beat!" So I just pop it in, titles just come right off his fuckin' head.

== Content ==
In the song, 2Pac raps about his paranoia and feeling he is under surveillance by the police and rival gangsters, as well as being willing to live the life as a "thug nigga" and "boss player". The song contains a sample of Linda Clifford's "Never Gonna Stop", originally recorded by Exile.

== Critical reception ==
Roger Morton of NME cited "All Eyez on Me" as one of the songs from All Eyez on Me which he described as "superbly unsettling, unprecedented renderings of the fear-soaked, hardcore-G mentality."

== Charts ==
Chart performance for "All Eyez on Me"
Chart (2023)	Peak position
Russia Airplay (TopHit) Gangsta Mix	23

== Certifications ==
Certifications for "All Eyez on Me"
Region	Certification	Certified units/sales
Denmark (IFPI Danmark)	Platinum	90,000^{‡}
Germany (BVMI)	Gold	300,000^{‡}
Italy (FIMI)	Gold	50,000^{‡}
New Zealand (RMNZ)	3× Platinum	90,000^{‡}
Spain (Promusicae)	Gold	30,000^{‡}
United Kingdom (BPI)	Platinum	600,000^{‡}
^{‡} Sales+streaming figures based on certification alone.
