= Outlaw 4 Life: 2005 A.P. =

Studio album by Outlawz
- Released: April 19, 2005
- Recorded: 2004–2005
- Genre: Gangsta rap
- Label: 33rd Street; 1Nation
- Producer: Focus...; Armando Colon; Gorilla Tek; J-Mack; Outlawz; The Legendary Traxster

Outlawz chronology
Neva Surrenda (2002)	Outlaw 4 Life: 2005 A.P. (2005)	Can't Sell Dope Forever (2006)

Professional ratings
Review scores
Source	Rating
AllMusic	link

Outlaw 4 Life: 2005 A.P. is the fourth studio album by Outlawz, It was released on April 19, 2005. The letters A.P. in the title mean "After Pac" referring to their former groupmate and rapper Tupac Shakur who was assassinated in 1996, nine years before the release of the album.

== Track listing ==
No.	Title	Producer(s)	Length
1.	"Real Talk" (featuring Focus...)	Focus...	3:49
2.	"Can't Turn Back"	A.D. Future for Divine Music Group	4:09
3.	"Celebrate" (featuring TQ)	REO of The Soundkillers	3:31
4.	"Big Ballin" (featuring Bun B & Stormey)	The Legendary Traxster	4:13
5.	"They Don't Understand"	Dani Kartel	4:10
6.	"Let It Burn" (featuring Chair Krazy)	The Legendary Traxster	4:34
7.	"If You Want 2"	Focus...	4:18
8.	"These Are the Times" (featuring Stormey, Khujo Goodie & Malachi)	Armondo Colon	4:46
9.	"Ghetto Gospel Pt. 2"	A.D. Future for Divine Music Group	4:47
10.	"Smiling Faces" (featuring F'Lana Star)	Jay Mac for Dark City; E.D.I.	3:15
11.	"I Dare U" (featuring Focus...)	Focus...	3:15
12.	"Don't Get It Fucked Up"	Jay Mac for Dark City; E.D.I.	4:03
13.	"Sacred Vows (And I Do)" (featuring Stormey)	Jay Mac for Dark City; E.D.I.	5:24
14.	"Better It Get"	Gorilla Tek	4:11
15.	"Interlude" (featuring C. Bone Jones)	E.D.I.	0:21
16.	"Listen 2 Me"	Jay Mac for Dark City; E.D.I.	3:53
17.	"Losing My Mind" (featuring Stormey)	Gorilla Tek	3:53

== Charts ==
Chart (2005)	Peak position
US Top R&B/Hip-Hop Albums	44
US Top Rap Albums	19
US Top Independent Albums	33
