= We Want In: The Street LP =

Studio album by Outlawz
- Released: August 5, 2008
- Recorded: 2008
- Genre: Gangsta rap; hardcore hip hop
- Length: 50:07
- Label: Gold Dust Media; 1Nation Entertainment
- Producer: E.D.I.; K-Salaam & Beatnick; Aktual; Kaiser Sosa; Tha Nox; Boondox; J-Bo; Cozmo; Ayo

Outlawz chronology
Can't Sell Dope Forever (2006)	We Want In: The Street LP (2008)	The Lost Songs Vol. 1 (2010)

Professional ratings
Review scores
Source	Rating
RapReviews.com	(7.0/10)
Hip Hop Warlord	(2.5/5)

We Want In: The Street LP is the fifth studio album released by Outlawz, It was released on August 5, 2008. It features J-Bo of YoungBloodZ, C-Bo, Maserati Rick, and Stormey.

== Track listing ==
No.	Title	Producer(s)	Length
1.	"We Want In"	Beat Nik & K-Salaam	3:58
2.	"Everything Happenz 4 a Reason"	Aktual	4:02
3.	"Failure Ain't an Option"	Kaiser Sosa	3:16
4.	"Hunger Pains"	Aktual	4:28
5.	"Love of Money" (featuring Keion)	Cozmo	4:30
6.	"Thuggin Till I Die" (featuring C-Bo)	Tha Nox	5:10
7.	"I'm Mister"	Boondox	4:43
8.	"My Life"	E.D.I.	3:58
9.	"Do It Like That" (featuring J-Bo)	J-Bo	3:25
10.	"I Can't Lie" (featuring Tha Pimtationz)	Cozmo	4:51
11.	"Take It Off" (featuring Keion)	Cozmo	3:31
12.	"It's My Turn" (featuring Maserati Rick & Nutt-So)	AYO	4:14

== Charts ==
Chart (2008)	Peak position
U.S. Billboard Top R&B/Hip-Hop Albums	84
