= Neva Surrenda =

Studio album by Outlawz
- Released: October 22, 2002
- Genre: Gangsta rap
- Labels: Outlaw; Rap-A-Lot
- Producers: J. Prince (exec.); Mike Dean; Mr. Lee

Outlawz chronology
Novakane (2001)	Neva Surrenda (2002)	Outlaw 4 Life: 2005 A.P. (2005)

Neva Surrenda is the third studio album by hip hop group Outlawz. It was released on October 22, 2002 on Outlaw Recordz.

== Track listing ==
No.	Title	Producer(s)	Length
1.	"Intro"	Mike Dean	0:21
2.	"Gatz Up"	Mr Lee	4:48
3.	"What Side U On?" (featuring Hot Boys)	Mr Lee	6:18
4.	"Move Somethin'" (featuring Willie D)	Mike Dean	3:44
5.	"Everything Is Alright"	Mr Lee	4:15
6.	"Playtime"	Mr Lee	4:26
7.	"Stick 2 the Plan" (featuring Big Syke)	Mr Lee	3:30
8.	"Not Real"	Mr Lee	4:26
9.	"Us"	Mr Lee	5:28
10.	"Black Diamond"	Mr Lee	2:59
11.	"Why?"	Mike Dean	5:07
12.	"Pleasure of Sin" (featuring Yukmouth & Big Syke)	Mr Lee	4:40
13.	"Desperation"	Mike Dean	4:04
14.	"Blessings"	Mr Lee	4:57
15.	"Lost and Turned Out"	Mr Lee	5:28
16.	"Outro"	Mike Dean	1:32

== Charts ==
Chart (2002)	Peak position
US Top R&B/Hip-Hop Albums	80
