= Ride wit Us or Collide wit Us =

Studio album by Outlawz
- Released: November 7, 2000
- Recorded: 1999–2000
- Genres: Gangsta rap; hardcore hip-hop
- Length: 59:24
- Labels: Outlaw; Bayside
- Producers: Outlawz (exec.); E.D.I.; Mike Dean; Mr. Lee; Femi Ojetunde; Reef; Quimmy Quim

Outlawz chronology
Still I Rise (1999)	Ride wit Us or Collide wit Us (2000)	Novakane (2001)

Singles from Ride wit Us or Collide wit Us
- 1. "Black Rain" Released: 2000

Professional ratings
Review scores
Source	Rating
AllMusic	3/5 stars

Ride wit Us or Collide wit Us is the debut album by rap group Outlawz, excluding their collaborative Still I Rise with 2Pac. It was released on November 7, 2000, on Outlaw Recordz and Bayside Entertainment.

== Track listing ==
#	Title	Performer (s)	Producer(s)	Length
1	"Intro"	E.D.I.	E.D.I.	0:36
2	"Outlaw 2000"	E.D.I.; Kastro; Napoleon; Young Noble; Akwylah	Mr Lee	4:41
3	"Life Is What You Make It"	E.D.I.; Kastro; Napoleon; Young Noble	Quimmy Quim	3:31
4	"Black Rain"	E.D.I.; Kastro; Napoleon; Young Noble; Val Young	Femi Ojetunde	5:04
5	"Hang On"	Young Noble; Ya Yo; Hellraza	Quimmy Quim	4:25
6	"Soldier to a General"	E.D.I.; Kastro; Napoleon; Young Noble	E.D.I.	4:12
7	"When I Go"	E.D.I.; Kastro; Young Noble; Val Young	Femi Ojetunde	3:46
8	"Who?"	Young Noble; Akwylah; Phats Bossi	Mike Dean	4:04
9	"The Nyquil Theory"	E.D.I.	E.D.I.	1:01
10	"Fuck with Me"	E.D.I.; Kastro; Napoleon; Young Noble	Mr Lee	4:09
11	"Get Paid"	E.D.I.; Kastro; Napoleon; Young Noble; TQ	E.D.I.	4:26
12	"Good Bye"	E.D.I.; Kastro; Napoleon; Young Noble; Hellraza; Coolio; Divine	Quimmy Quim; Reefologist	5:05
13	"Mask Down"	E.D.I.; Young Noble; Napoleon; H-Ryda; Ya Yo	E.D.I.; Quimmy Quim	3:30
14	"Nobody Cares"	E.D.I.; Kastro; Napoleon; Young Noble; Supreme C	E.D.I.	4:33
15	"Geronimo Ji Jaga"	Geronimo "Ji Jaga" Pratt	E.D.I.	1:35
16	"Maintain"	E.D.I.; Kastro; Napoleon; Young Noble; Hellraza; Supreme C	E.D.I.	5:07
17	"Smash"	Napoleon; Young Noble; Bad Azz; Low Lives; Spice 1	Quimmy Quim	5:10
18	"Jersey Mob"	E.D.I.		0:53
19	"Murder Made Easy"	E.D.I.; Akwylah; Dirty Bert; Smooth; Trife	Quimmy Quim	4:51

== Charts ==
Chart (2000)	Peak position
U.S. Billboard 200	95
U.S. Billboard Top R&B/Hip-Hop Albums	16
U.S. Billboard Top Independent Albums	6
