= E.D.I. Mean =

American rapper (born 1974)

E.D.I Mean
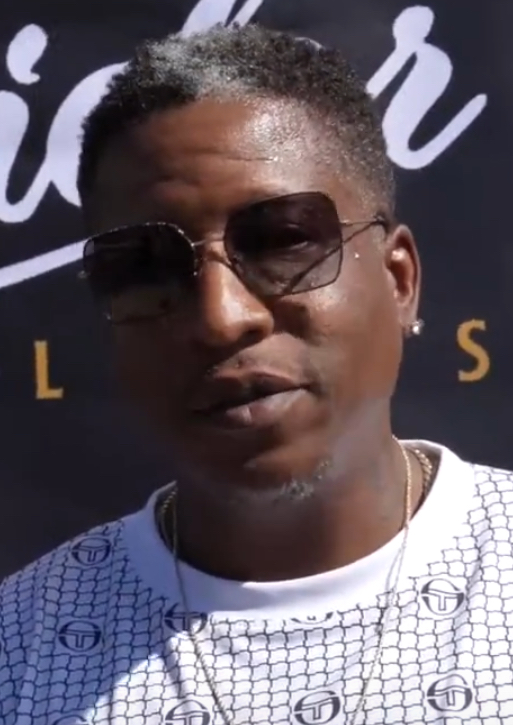
- E.D.I. Mean in 2021

Background information
- Also known as: Big Malc; E.D.I Mean; EDIDON
- Born: Malcolm Greenidge; July 7, 1974 (age 52); New York City, U.S.
- Genre: Hip hop
- Occupations: Rapper; producer; songwriter
- Years active: 1992–present
- Labels: Outlaw; Death Row; Ca$hville; Real Talk
- Formerly of: Outlawz

Malcolm Greenidge (born July 7, 1974), known as E.D.I Mean and EDIDON, is an American rapper and record producer, he was a member of the Outlawz. The name is a play on the name Idi Amin, former dictator of Uganda. While in the third grade, Malcolm became friends with Katari "Kastro" Cox who later introduced him to his cousin, Tupac Shakur.

== Dramacydal ==
In 1992, Kastro, Greenidge, and Tupac's godbrother Yafeu "Kadafi" Fula, formed a rap trio. Greenridge began rapping under the alias "Big Malcolm". The trio went under the names Thoro Headz and Young Thugs. By then, Tupac had become a rap star and they were featured on his song Flex which was the B side of his "Holla If Ya Hear Me" single which was released on February 4, 1993. In late 1993, Mutah "Napoleon" Beale joined the group, which was now known as Dramacydal. They guest appeared on the songs "Me Against the World" and "Outlaw" from Tupac's LP, Me Against the World, which was released on March 14, 1995.

== Outlawz ==
Upon Tupac's release from prison in 1995, Greenidge, Tupac, Bruce "Hussein" Washington, Kadafi, Big Syke, Mopreme Shakur, Kastro, and Napoleon formed the group Outlaw Immortalz, which later changed to the Outlawz. Tupac gave each group member an alias from an enemy of the United States of America. Shakur gave Greenidge the alias E.D.I Mean after former Ugandan president Idi Amin. E.D.I Mean appeared on "Tradin' War Stories," "When We Ride," and "Thug Passion from Tupac's double LP, All Eyez on Me, which was released on February 13, 1996.

On June 4, 1996, Tupac's "How Do U Want It" single was released. Its b-side, "Hit 'Em Up", featured E.D.I Mean, Hussein and Kadafi. It is considered one of the most aggressive diss songs in history, dissing Bad Boy Entertainment, Chino XL, Junior M.A.F.I.A. and Mobb Deep.

On September 7, 1996, Tupac was shot four times in a drive-by-shooting in Las Vegas, Nevada. He was taken to University Medical Center where he died six days later. E.D.I Mean was in the car behind Tupac, but claimed he could not identify the murderer. E.D.I Mean and the rest of the Outlawz moved back to the East Coast after Shakur's death. Tupac's LP, The Don Killuminati: The 7 Day Theory, was released on November 5, 1996. E.D.I Mean appeared on three songs, "Intro/Bomb First (My Second Reply)," "Life Of An Outlaw" and "Just Like Daddy. On November 10, just five days after Tupac's album was released, Kadafi was shot in the head in New Jersey, while visiting his girlfriend, and died instantly. He was found wearing a bullet proof vest.

In March 1997, E.D.I Mean and the rest of the Outlawz (minus Fatal) moved back to California and signed with Death Row Records. Tupac's double LP, "R U Still Down? (Remember Me)" was released on November 25, 1997. E.D.I Mean produced six songs on it, "Redemption," "Thug Style," "Fuck All Y'all," "Let Them Thangs Go," "When I Get Free," and "Enemies With Me." On December 21, 1999, the Outlawz' debut album, Still I Rise, was released.

In 1999, the Outlawz, (excluding Fatal, who by now had a disagreement with the group and felt they had betrayed Tupac by signing with Death Row), started Outlawz Records and released their second and third LPs, Ride Wit Us Or Collide Wit Us and Novakane, on November 7, 2000 and October 23, 2001.

== 2026 Tupac Shakur murder trial testimony ==
In August 2026, Greenidge testified as a prosecution witness in the Las Vegas murder trial of Duane "Keffe D" Davis regarding the murder of Tupac Shakur. Greenidge, who drove the vehicle positioned directly behind Shakur's automobile during the 1996 drive by shooting, recounted the sequence of events and described gunfire coming from the back seat of a light colored Cadillac.

== Discography ==
=== Solo albums ===
- 2010: The Stash Spot
- 2013: O.G. Est. 1992
- 2015: The Hope Dealer
- 2018: The Hope Dealer 2
- 2020: O.G. Part 2: Classics in Session
- 2023: OG 3: La Bella Vita
- 2023: The Hope Dealer, Pt. 3
- 2026: The Realest Shit I Ever Wrote

=== Collaboration albums ===
- 2002: Blood Brothers (with Kastro)
- 2006: Against All Oddz (with Young Noble)
- 2008: Doin' It Big (with 8Ball)
- 2015: Ghetto Starz: Streets to the Stage (with Nutt-So)
- 2022: Souljahz 2 Generalz (with Yhung T.O.)
- 2024: Street Fame (The Soundtrack) (with Various Artists)
- 2024: Amg Boyz Presents Greatness EP (with Marsz)
- 2024: Blood Brothers 2 (with Ed Bone)
- 2026: This Thing of Ours (with H-Ryda)

=== Singles ===
- 2013: "No Lights On" (feat. Stormey Coleman & Redcoat da Poet)
- 2015: "The Move-ment"
- 2015: "#W!NU4" (feat. Deladiea & DJ Stay Turnt Up)
- 2016: "Love Will Do"
- 2016: "Visions" (Sacx One & Dr. X feat. Edidon)
- 2017: "Wounds" (feat. Young Noble)
- 2018: "Dreams" (feat. Aktual)
- 2020: "Roses"
- 2020: "Ridin'"
- 2021: "One Nation" (feat. Xzibit)
- 2021: "21 Gun Salute" (feat. C-Bo & Ajayofficial)

=== Guest appearances ===
- 1996: "Bomb First (My Second Reply)" (Makaveli featuring E.D.I. Mean & Young Noble)
- 1998: "Young Ritzy Outlaw" (Gonzoe featuring E.D.I. Mean)
- 2000: "Thug Livin' (Part II)" (Killa Tay featuring Cosmo & E.D.I. Mean)
- 2001: "Good Life" (2Pac featuring Big Syke & E.D.I. Mean)
- 2002: "Never B Peace (Nitty Remix)" (2Pac featuring Kastro & E.D.I. Mean)
- 2002: "Out Of Position" (Hellraza featuring E.D.I.)
- 2002: "Get Doe" (Hellraza featuring Akwalla, Phats Bossi & E.D.I. Mean)
- 2002: "My Niggaz" (Big Syke featuring E.D.I. Mean & Young Noble)
- 2002: "Because Of U Girl (OG Mix)" (Daz Dillinger featuring Storm & E.D.I. Mean)
- 2004: "The Uppercut" (2Pac featuring E.D.I. Mean & Young Noble)
- 2004: "Hennessey (Red Spyda Remix)" (2Pac featuring Sleepy Brown & E.D.I. Mean)
- 2009: "Ice Kold" (Tha Realest featuring E.D.I. Mean)

=== As producer ===
- 1999: 2Pac + Outlawz – Still I Rise
  13. "Tattoo Tears"
- 2000: Tupac Shakur - The Rose That Grew from Concrete
  16. "In The Event Of My Demise"
- 2000: Outlawz - Ride wit Us or Collide wit Us
  1. "Intro"
  6. "Soldier to a General"
  9. "The Nyquil Theory"
  11. "Get Paid" (feat. TQ)
  13. "Mask Down"
  14. "Nobody Cares"
  15. "Geronimo Ji Jaga"
  16. "Maintain"
- 2001: 2Pac - Until the End of Time
- 2001: Jerzey Mob - Mix Tape Vol. 1
  9. Please Believe It (feat. Big Syke, Nutt-So & Outlawz)
- 2002: Kastro & Edi - Blood Brothers
  1. Makaveli and Kadafi's Intro
  3. No More
  11. So Wrong (feat. Jazze Pha)
- 2002: Hussein Fatal – FATAL
1. Intro (Rough Shit)"
  11. Daddy (feat. Scarface)
- 2002: 2Pac – Better Dayz
  9. (Disc 1) Whatcha Gonna Do? (feat. Outlawz)
  9. (Disc 2) Catchin' Feelins (feat. Outlawz)
- 2002: Hellraza – Hell Razed Us
  11. Out of Position
  15. Get Doe (feat. Akwalla, EDI, Fatz)
- 2002: Young Noble - Noble Justice
  5. Noble Justice
  7. Over Again (feat. EDI)
  15. Your World (feat. Baby Girl)
  19. Lightz Out (feat. Yukmouth, Lil Zane & Bad Azz)
- 2002: Outlawz - Worldwide
- 2002: Thirst & Loch - No Soap No Rags
  4. 4 Ueva (feat. Outlawz)
- 2002: Law-n-Orda - Ground Zero
  8. How the Game Goes
- 2002: JT the Bigga Figga & Young Noble - Street Warz
  13. Lights Out (feat. Young Noble, EDI, Bad Azz, Lil Zane)
  14. Part of Life (Napoleon, Tripple 7)
- 2003: Tupac: Resurrection
- 2004: 2Pac - Loyal to the Game
- 2005: Mopreme Shakur - Evolution of a Thug N.I.G.G.A. Vol. 1
  11. Sick Thoughts (feat. Outlawz)
- 2006: 2Pac – Pac's Life
  8. Don't Sleep (feat. Lil' Scrappy, Nutt-So, Yaki Kadafi & Stormey)
- 2006: Dead Prez and Outlawz – Can't Sell Dope Forever
  3. Can't Sell Dope Forever
  6. Thuggin' on the Blokkk
  10. Fork in the Road
- 2007: 2Pac – Nu-Mixx Klazzics Vol. 2
  11. How Do U Want It [Nu Mixx]
- 2007: Outlawz - We Want In: The Street LP
  8. My Life
- 2009: Outlawz - Outlaw Culture Vol. 2
  17. Keep Pushin' (feat. Antwon, Skitekk)
- 2010: EDIDON - The Stash Spot
- 2013: EDIDON - O.G. Est. 1992
- 2014: EDIDON - The Hope Dealer
- 2014: Skitekk - Tape
  10. Keep Pushin (feat. Outlawz & Murder Mack)
