= Still I Rise (album) =

Studio album by 2Pac and Outlawz
- Released: December 21, 1999
- Studios: Can-Am Studios (Tarzana, Los Angeles); Pacifique and Track (North Hollywood, Los Angeles)
- Genres: Gangsta rap; conscious hip-hop
- Length: 72:45
- Label: Interscope
- Producers: Tony Pizarro; Daz; Johnny "J"; Darryl "Big D" Harper; Kurupt; QDIII; Quimmy Quim; Soulshock; Damon Thomas; 2Pac; Mr. Lee; E.D.I. Mean; L Rock Ya; Reef

2Pac chronology
Greatest Hits (1998)	Still I Rise (1999)	Until the End of Time (2001)

Outlawz chronology
Still I Rise (1999)	Ride wit Us or Collide wit Us (2000)

Singles from Still I Rise
- 1. "Baby Don't Cry (Keep Ya Head Up II)" Released: October 28, 1999

Professional ratings
Review scores
Source	Rating
AllMusic	2.5/5 stars
Los Angeles Times	3/4 stars
NME	3/5 stars
RapReviews	6/10
The Rolling Stone Album Guide	1/5 stars
Uncut	3/5 stars

Still I Rise is a collaboration album by 2Pac and Outlawz, released on December 21, 1999, via Interscope Records. The album excludes some of the original lineup of Outlawz, including Hussein Fatal, who had left the group as he had refused to sign with Death Row Records. The album contains all previously unreleased, albeit remixed material.

The album features production from 2Pac's close producers Tony Pizarro, Johnny "J" and QDIII, and appearances from Big Syke and Nate Dogg. The album features mostly tracks from Shakur while he was on Death Row Records.

The album debuted at number 7 on the US Billboard 200 chart, selling 408,000 in the first week. The album was certified platinum by the Recording Industry Association of America (RIAA) for shipping and selling over a million copies in America.

== Singles ==
"Baby Don't Cry (Keep Ya' Head Up II)", which features the female group H.E.A.T., was the only single from the album. The song "Letter to the President" is featured in the film Training Day (2001).

== Commercial performance ==
Still I Rise debuted at number 7 on the US Billboard 200 chart, selling 408,000 in the first week. On February 2, 2000, the album was certified Platinum by the Recording Industry Association of America (RIAA) for sales of over one million copies. As of September 2011, the album has sold a total of 1,692,316 copies in the United States, according to Nielsen Soundscan.

On February 10, 2000, the album was certified Gold by Music Canada (MC) for sales of over 50,000 units in Canada. On March 14, 2014, the album was certified Gold by British Phonographic Industry (BPI) for 100,000 units sold in the United Kingdom.

== Track listing ==
#	Title	Producer	Time
1	"Letter to the President" (feat. Big Syke)	QD III	6:03
2	"Still I Rise"	Johnny J	4:45
3	"Secretz of War"	Johnny J	4:15
4	"Baby Don't Cry (Keep Ya Head Up II)"	2Pac; Soulshock and Karlin	4:22
5	"As the World Turns"	Darryl "Big D" Harper	5:08
6	"Black Jesuz"	2Pac; L Rock Ya; Mr. Lee	4:29
7	"Homeboyz"	Daz Dillinger	3:38
8	"Hell 4 a Hustler"	Damon Thomas	4:56
9	"High Speed"	Darryl "Big D" Harper	5:59
10	"The Good Die Young"	Darryl "Big D" Harper	5:42
11	"Killuminati"	Tony Pizarro	4:02
12	"Teardrops and Closed Caskets" (feat. Nate Dogg & Val Young)	QD III	5:05
13	"Tattoo Tears"	Kurupt; E.D.I. Mean	5:02
14	"U Can Be Touched"	Johnny J	4:23
15	"Y'all Don't Know Us"	Quimmy Quim; Reef	4:55

== Charts ==
=== Weekly charts ===
Chart (2000)	Peak position
Australian Albums (ARIA)	54
Austrian Albums (Ö3 Austria)	48
Canadian Albums (RPM)	9
Dutch Albums (Album Top 100)	24
German Albums (Offizielle Top 100)	24
Irish Albums (IRMA)	50
New Zealand Albums (RMNZ)	49
Swiss Albums (Schweizer Hitparade)	86
UK Albums (Official Charts)	75
UK R&B Albums (Official Charts)	14
US Billboard 200	6
US Top R&B/Hip-Hop Albums (Billboard)	2

Chart (2026)	Peak position
Greek Albums (IFPI)	100

=== Year-end charts ===
Chart (2000)	Position
US Billboard 200	58
US Top R&B/Hip-Hop Albums (Billboard)	15

=== Singles ===
Year	Song	Billboard Hot 100	Hot R&B/Hip-Hop Singles & Tracks
1999	"Baby Don't Cry (Keep Ya Head Up II)"	72	36

== Certifications ==
Region	Certification	Certified units/sales
Canada (Music Canada)	Gold	50,000^{^}
United Kingdom (BPI)	Gold	100,000^{*}
United States (RIAA)	Platinum	1,692,316
^{*} Sales figures based on certification alone.^{^} Shipments figures based on certification alone.
