= Napoleon (rapper) =

American rapper (born 1977)

- Born: Mutah Wassin Shabazz Beale; October 7, 1977 (age 48)
- Origin: Irvington, New Jersey, U.S.
- Genres: Hip hop
- Occupations: Rapper, Politician motivational speaker
- Years active: 1994–2005 (rapping); 2005–present (as motivational speaker)
- Labels: Outlaw, Death Row
- Formerly of: Outlawz

Mutah Wassin Shabazz Beale (born October 7, 1977), better known as Napoleon, is an American former rapper of Tupac's rap group Outlawz. He has since converted to Islam and is now a motivational speaker.

== Early life ==
Beale grew up in Irvington, New Jersey. He was raised by his Christian grandmother after his Muslim parents were murdered in their home in front of him in “an ‘execution-style’ slaying” when he was three.

== Career ==
Napoleon was a member of the Outlawz (originally "Dramacydal", subsequently "tha Outlaw Immortalz"), a hip hop group founded by rapper Tupac Shakur in late 1995 after Shakur's release from prison. Collectively, they were best known for their association with Shakur, coming to prominence by appearing on his Makaveli album. After Shakur's death in 1996, the group were co-billed on the posthumous album Still I Rise, and released their first album, Ride wit Us or Collide wit Us in 2000. Napoleon also appeared on their next two albums, Novakane (2001) and Neva Surrenda (2002). In 2006, Napoleon released his only solo album Loyalty Over Money.

== Conversion to Islam ==
In 2001, a Muslim record producer, impressed by Napoleon's potential as a leader, motivated him to embrace Islam and forsake his former use of alcohol and drugs. Beale considers hip hop and Islam to be incompatible, because "they basically call for two different things" and that even if the song's message is positive, "if it is not according to the Sunnah (teachings) of the Prophet Muhammad, then it is unacceptable".

== Personal life ==
He married a Yemeni woman with whom he has three children. As of 2003, he and his brother owned a barbershop in Studio City, Los Angeles. He is also a co-owner of 4 restaurants and a cafe in Riyadh.

== Discography ==
Solo album

- Loyalty over Money (2006)

with Outlawz

- Still I Rise (1999)
- Ride wit Us or Collide wit Us (2000)
- Novakane (2001)
- Neva Surrenda (2002)

Compilation album

- The Loyalty Fam (2005)

== Filmography ==
- Thug Life (2001)
- Outlawz: Worldwide (DVD) (2002)
- Tupac: Assassination (2007)
- Life of an Outlaw (2019)
