= Hussein Fatal =

American rapper (1977–2015)

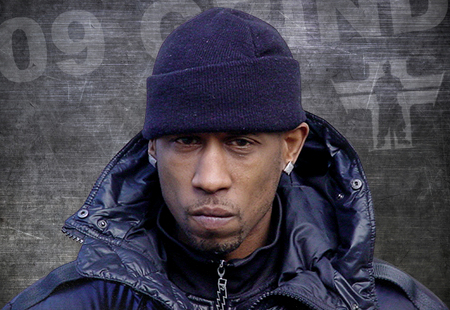
- Fatal in 2009

Background information
- Also known as: Fatal Hussein; Fatalvelli; Dizza; Dirty Bruce
- Born: Bruce Edward Washington Jr. April 3, 1973; Montclair, New Jersey, U.S.
- Died: July 10, 2015 (aged 42) Banks County, Georgia, U.S.
- Occupation: Rapper
- Years active: 1993–2015
- Labels: Thugtertainment; Relativity; Rap-A-Lot
- Formerly of: Outlawz

Bruce Edward Washington Jr. (April 3, 1973 – July 10, 2015), better known by his stage name Hussein Fatal or sometimes as Fatal Hussein, was an American rapper, best known for his collaborative work with Tupac Shakur as a member of the rap group Outlawz.

== Early life ==
Fatal was born Bruce Edward Washington Jr. in New Jersey on April 3, 1973.

== Career ==
Washington first appeared as "Hussein Fatal" in February 1996 on the songs "All Bout U" and "When We Ride" from Shakur's album All Eyez on Me. As a member of the Outlaw Immortalz, his name was chosen to evoke a villain, Iraqi president Saddam Hussein. In June 1996, he was featured on Shakur's song "Hit 'Em Up", insulting Shakur's rivals in the song's second verse.

After 2Pac died in September 1996 and Outlawz member Yaki Kadafi died in November, Washington did not appear on another recording until 1998 when Relativity Records released his first solo album In the Line of Fire. The label went bankrupt; the album wasn't promoted and sold poorly. Washington did not appear on the Outlawz debut album, Still I Rise.

Washington then signed with Rap-A-Lot Records and began work on a second solo studio album, Death Before Dishonor, recording over 40 songs before being arrested in December 1999 for an assault committed three years earlier. Rap-A-Lot Records released the album as Fatal after he was paroled in 2002.

Around 2003, through his affiliation with Rap-A-Lot, Washington began associating with Irv Gotti's Murder Inc. Records. That year, Washington performed on four songs of Ja Rule's album Blood in My Eye: "The Life", "It's Murda (Freestyle)", "The Wrap (Freestyle)" and the eponymous title track, "Blood in My Eye". He also made a cameo appearance in the music video for Clap Back, and appeared on the remix of Ashanti's "Rain On Me".

Washington performed again with the Outlawz on their 2010 mixtape Killuminati 2K10 and their 2011 mixtape Killuminati 2K11, and on the 2011 album, Perfect Timing. He also appeared on the tracks "Emancipation" and "Welcome To Real Life", from fellow Outlawz member Young Noble's 2012 album Son of God. He continued to release mixtapes on his own label, Thugtertainment, until his death.

== Death ==
Washington was killed in a traffic collision in Banks County, Georgia, on July 10, 2015. He was 42 years old. His girlfriend, Zanetta Yearby, was charged with DUI, first-degree vehicular homicide, and reckless driving.

== Discography ==
Solo albums	Year	Label
In the Line of Fire	1998	Relativity Records
Fatal	2002	Rap-a-Lot, Asylum Records
Born Legendary	2009	Thugtertainment
The Interview: It's Not a Gimmik 2 Me	2013	Thugtertainment
Ridin' All Week on 'Em	2015	Thugtertainment
Legendary Status	2018	Hussein Entertainment
With Young Noble	Year	Label
Thug in Thug Out	2007	High Powered, Koch, Thugtertainment, 1Nation Ent.
Outlaw Nation Vol. 3 (Mixtape)	2013	Thugtertainment, Outlaw Recordz
Jerzey Giantz (Mixtape)	2014	Thugtertainment, Outlaw Recordz
With Nutt-So	Year	Label
Outkasted Outlawz	2010	Nutty's Playhouse Entertainment, Thugtertainment
With Outlawz	Year	Label
Killuminati 2K10	2010	1Nation Ent., Thugtertainment
Killuminati 2K11	2011	1Nation Ent., Thugtertainment
Perfect Timing	2011	Universal, Fontana, 1Nation Ent., Krude

== Filmography ==
Year	Title	Role	Notes
2002	Outlawz: Worldwide	himself	Documentary DVD
2003	Eyes On Hip Hop – The Chronicle Vol.1	himself	Documentary DVD
2003	Beef	himself	Documentary DVD
2004	All Access Vol.5	himself	Documentary DVD
2007	Smooth: The Game Is Dead	–	Motion picture debut
2008	The Money Kept Coming	himself	Documentary DVD
2008	Ca$h Rules	M.J.	Motion picture debut
2011	Sex, Money and You Already Know: The Hykine Johnson Story	Fatal	Motion picture debut
2013	Napoleon: Life of an Outlaw	himself	Documentary DVD
2013	Sleeping With Angels	Walter Kurtz	Motion picture debut
2013	Can't Forget New Jersey	himself	Documentary
2013	Bound by Blood	–	Motion picture debut
