= Young Noble =

American rapper (1978–2025)

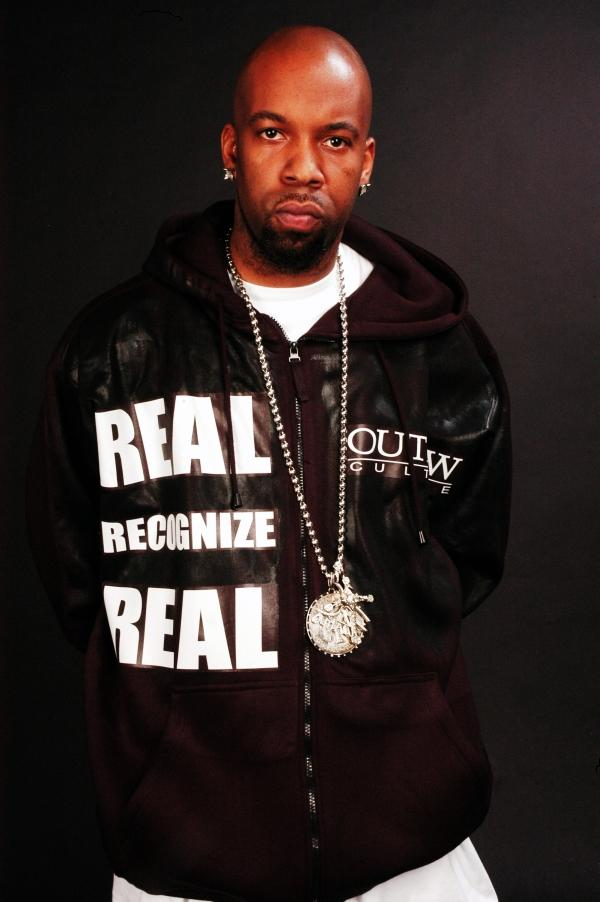
- Young Noble in 2006

Background information
- Born: Rufus Lee Cooper III; March 21, 1978; Sierra Madre, California, U.S.
- Origin: Montclair, New Jersey, U.S.
- Died: July 4, 2025 (aged 47) Snellville, Georgia, U.S.
- Genres: West Coast hip-hop
- Occupation: Rapper
- Years active: 1996–2025
- Labels: Outlawz; 1Nation Entertainment; Death Row; Affluent; Real Talk Ent.; Ca$hville
- Formerly of: Outlawz

Rufus Lee Cooper III (March 21, 1978 – July 4, 2025), also known by his stage name Young Noble, was an American rapper and member of Tupac Shakur's rap group Outlawz.

== Early life ==
Noble was born in Sierra Madre, California, a suburb of Los Angeles. He grew up in nearby in Pasadena, and at the age of eight, moved to New Jersey where he met future Outlaw members Hussein Fatal and Yaki Kadafi. Around the age of 16, he moved back to California to live with his sister in Rancho Cucamonga.

== Career ==
Through his affiliation with Hussein Fatal and Yaki Kadafi, they introduced him to their friend, rapper 2Pac. He made his debut on 2Pac's album The Don Killuminati: The 7 Day Theory, on the songs "Bomb First (My Second Reply)", "Hail Mary", "Life of an Outlaw", and "Just Like Daddy". Having joined the Outlawz in early 1996, Noble was the last member to be added to the group by Shakur himself, before the rapper's death in September 1996. A platinum-selling collaborative album, Still I Rise, between Shakur and Outlawz was released in 1999, with Noble contributing to several tracks.

Noble's first solo album, Noble Justice, was released in 2002. Over the years, he made other solo albums, was involved in several projects with other members of Outlawz, and also released collaborative albums with other artists such as the Bone Thugs-n-Harmony members Krayzie Bone and Layzie Bone.

== Songs recorded with 2Pac ==
Young Noble recorded at least ten songs with 2Pac while the rapper was still alive. On songs "Just Like Daddy" and "As the World Turns" (Original) 2Pac referred to Young Noble as Marbles.

1. "Tattoo Tearz" (Original) (Recorded on March 30 & June 17, 1996) (Remixed version appeared as Track # 13 on Still I Rise)
2. "Life of an Outlaw" (Recorded on July 2, 1996, appeared as Track # 6 on The Don Killuminati: The 7 Day Theory)
3. "Hail Mary" (Recorded on July 8, 1996, appeared as Track # 2 on The Don Killuminati: The 7 Day Theory)
4. "Lost Souls" (Recorded on July 8, 1996, appeared as Track # 12 (CD 2) on Gang Related – The Soundtrack)
5. "Bomb First (My Second Reply)" (Recorded on July 12, 1996, appeared as Track # 1 on The Don Killuminati: The 7 Day Theory)
6. "Just Like Daddy" (Recorded on August 12, 1996, appeared as Track # 7 on The Don Killuminati: The 7 Day Theory)
7. "Runnin' On E" (Original) (Recorded on 13 August, 1996) (Remixed version appeared as Track # 12 (CD 2) on Until the End of Time)
8. "As The World Turns" (Original) (Recorded on August 22, 1996) (Remixed version appeared as Track # 5 on Still I Rise)
9. "All Out" (Original) (Recorded on July 6 & 5 September 1996) (Remixed version appeared as Track # 9 (CD 1) on Until the End of Time)
10. "Hell 4 a Hustler" (Original) (Recorded on July 6 & 6 September 1996) (Remixed version appeared as Track # 8 on Still I Rise)

== Performance with 2Pac and the Outlawz at the House of Blues ==
Young Noble performed with 2Pac and the other Outlawz on stage at the Los Angeles House of Blues on July 4, 1996 where he rapped his verse from "Tattoo Tearz" (Original) referring to a fight with the Wu-Tang Clan member GZA, and Hussein Fatal's verse from the diss track "Hit 'Em Up" because of Fatal's arrest right before the performance.

== Dispute with Nas ==
Nas's second album It Was Written was released on July 2, 1996. Nas' lead single "If I Ruled The World (Imagine That)" (Track # 14) was released on June 4, 1996, and the music video was released on the week ending on June 16, 1996, on 2Pac's 25th birthday. The music video featured an intro with a modified verse from the song "The Message" (Track # 2) which was suspected of having subliminal disses towards 2Pac and the Notorious B.I.G. even more than the album version: "You weak cats are played out, get robbed and laid out", referencing 2Pac's shooting and robbery at the New York Quad Studios on November 30, 1994. Nas would later repeat the move when he released the Jay-Z and Roc-A-Fella diss track Ether (Track # 2 on Stillmatic) on Jay-Z's birthday on December 4, 2001. The song "Street Dreams" (Track # 3) used the same sample as 2Pac's "All Eyez On Me". The songs "Take It In Blood" (Track # 6) and "Silent Murder" (Bonus track # 15) were produced by Stretch and the Live Squad, 2Pac's former friends who 2Pac accused of setting him up at the Quad Studios shooting. Stretch was killed exactly a year later on November 30, 1995. The song "Nas Is Coming" (Track # 7) was produced and featured Dr. Dre who recently left Death Row records.

2Pac premiered his song "Troublesome '96" on July 4, 1996, at the House of Blues starting with words for Nas, taking the same sample from the Whodini song "Friends" as Nas used for "If I Ruled The World (Imagine That)" like Nas did with "Street Dreams". 2Pac and Nas confronted each other in New York at the 1996 MTV Video Music Awards on September 4, 1996, and allegedly squashed their beef. Young Noble was with 2Pac and spoke about in his last interview. 2Pac was shot and died on September 13, 1996 in Las Vegas, Nevada. His posthumously released album The Don Killuminati: The 7 Day Theory (under the alias Makaveli) featured the song "Against All Odds" (Track # 12) which was a response to Nas' "The Message".

Later in 1996 Nas recorded a song "Real ******" which sampled "The Message" in the intro: "Who got the ends, the type of a ***** 2Pac pretends", confirming that "The Message" really was directed at 2Pac. Nas again dissed the late 2Pac on a DJ Clue mixtape Cluemanatti Pt. 2: The Rematch on the song "Freestyle Intro": "Black Pirellis rolling over this Makaveli". Mobb Deep released their single featuring Nas "It's Mine" on August 31, 1999. It featured a hook and a Nas verse suspected of having subliminal disses towards the late 2Pac. 2Pac and the Outlawz's album Still I Rise was released on December 21, 1999, and the Outlawz freestyled on Rap City soon after, responding to "It's Mine": Young Noble rapped "You sayin' Thug Life yours, betta act a clown, Cause when you see us, dawg ain't no backin' down" and Napoleon saying "Thug Life is yours... SIC! You gone see boy... Get it right!".

After years of subliminal disses and commentary from Nas, Young Noble took him on on January 3, 2025, in the song "EUTHANASIA".

== Death ==
Cooper died from suicide by gunshot in Snellville, Georgia, on July 4, 2025, at the age of 47. According to police records on the same day, officers responded to a 911 call around 9 AM at the Country Club of Gwinnett in Snellville, Georgia, after a witness reported seeing a body in the pool. When police arrived, they discovered Cooper at the bottom of the pool wearing tan cargo shorts and a black T-shirt. He had died from what appeared to be a gunshot wound to the right side of his head. Near the body, officers recovered a spent shell casing and a small black Beretta Tomcat .32-caliber pistol.

Cooper's wife told police that he had been battling with depression and she had been actively trying to get him help. She last spoke to him around 2 AM, when he said he was going out to "clear his head." He never returned home, and her calls went unanswered. Cooper typically stayed home to care for their children, including a child with autism, while she worked. When he did not come back, she took the children to a relative's house and later found his car parked nearby.

Cooper's relatives also confirmed that he had been suffering from depression and financial pressures. His wife and E.D.I. Mean noted that his music career had declined and recent hardships, including the death of his mother, had taken a severe toll on his mental health.

== Discography ==
Solo albums

- Noble Justice (2002)
- Son of God (2012)
- Powerful (2016)
- 3rd Eye View (2019)
- Outlaw University (2023)
- Lucky Number 7 (2023)
- Positive Vibes Only (2024)
- The Last Outlaw (2024)

== Filmography ==
Year	Title	Role	Notes
2002	Outlawz: Worldwide	himself	Documentary DVD
2002	Chorchyp: The Way of the Samurai	himself	Documentary
2013	Napoleon: Life of an Outlaw	himself	Documentary DVD
2013	Bound by Blood	–	Motion picture debut
2017	All Eyez on Me	himself	Motion picture debut
