= Outlawz =

American hip hop collective

- The group in 1996. Standing: Napoleon, E.D.I. Mean, and Hussein Fatal; Below: Kastro, Makaveli and Yaki Kadafi

Background information
- Also known as: Outlaw Immortalz; Dramacydal; Fatal-N-Felony; Thug Life
- Origin: New Jersey
- Genres: West Coast hip hop; hardcore hip-hop; gangsta rap; horrorcore
- Works: Outlawz discography
- Years active: 1995–2025
- Labels: Death Row; Interscope; Outlaw; Rap-A-Lot
- Spinoff of: Thug Life
- Past members: Makaveli; Yaki Kadafi; E.D.I. Mean; Kastro; Hussein Fatal; Young Noble; Napoleon; Storm; Mussolini; Komani

Outlawz were an American hip-hop collective founded by Tupac Shakur (Makaveli) and Yafeu Fula (Yaki Kadafi) in 1995. The group's core members originally performed under the names Thoro Headz and Young Thugz, first gaining recognition for their guest appearance on Shakur's 1993 track "Flex", which served as the B-side to his single "Holler If Ya Hear Me".

By 1995, the group had reorganized as Dramacydal. Under this name, they were featured on the tracks "Me Against the World" and "Outlaw" from Shakur's third studio album, Me Against the World. Following Shakur's release from prison in late 1995, the group was officially rebranded as the Outlaw Immortalz.

== History ==
=== 1992–1995: Early days and Dramacydal ===
In 1992, Kastro (Katari Cox), E.D.I. Mean (Malcolm Greenridge), and Tupac's godbrother Yafeu "Kadafi" Fula formed a rap trio, originally performing under the names Thoro Headz and Young Thugs. Following Tupac's rise to prominence, the group was featured on his song "Flex", released on February 4, 1993, as the B-side to the single "Holla If Ya Hear Me".

In late 1993, Mutah "Napoleon" Beale joined the group, which rebranded as Dramacydal. They contributed guest appearances to the songs "Me Against the World" and "Outlaw" from Shakur's LP Me Against the World, released on March 14, 1995.

=== 1995–1996: Outlawz, and the deaths of Makaveli and Kadafi ===
In late 1995, following Shakur's release from prison, the collective reformed as the Outlaw Immortalz. The updated lineup featured Shakur (utilizing the alias Makaveli) alongside Hussein Fatal and Yaki Kadafi, who also performed as the duo Fatal-N-Felony. They were joined by former Thug Life members Big Syke and Mopreme Shakur, who adopted the aliases Mussolini and Komani, respectively. Shakur's former protégés from Dramacydal—Big Malc, K-Dog, and Lil' Mu—also joined the collective, taking on the names E.D.I. Mean, Kastro, and Napoleon.

This iteration of the group made its official debut on the song "When We Ride" from Shakur's 1996 album, All Eyez on Me. Storm, introduced during the same recording sessions, became the group's ninth member and only female affiliate. She subsequently began recording a solo album under Shakur's mentorship.

In June 1996, Hussein Fatal, Yaki Kadafi, and E.D.I. Mean were featured on Shakur's prominent diss track "Hit 'Em Up". Although Kastro and Napoleon did not perform on the track, they appeared in the accompanying music video. During the sessions for All Eyez on Me and "Hit 'Em Up," Hussein and Kadafi introduced Shakur to their associate Rufus Cooper III. Operating under the name Young Noble, Cooper became the tenth and final member to join the group during Shakur's lifetime and was featured extensively on the album The Don Killuminati: The 7 Day Theory.

On September 7, 1996, Tupac Shakur was critically wounded in a drive-by shooting in Las Vegas, Nevada. While he was hospitalized, members of the Outlawz and Death Row Records video director Gobi M. Rahimi took turns guarding his room due to security concerns. Six days later, on September 13, 1996, Shakur died from his injuries.

=== 1996–2025: Post-Shakur era and dissolution ===
Following Shakur's death, Hussein Fatal left the group and returned to New Jersey alongside Yaki Kadafi. On November 10, 1996, Kadafi was fatally shot in Orange, New Jersey. Prior to his death, the Las Vegas police had sought to interview him as a key witness to Shakur's murder. Storm also departed the collective shortly after.

In 1997, the Outlawz were featured on the Gang Related soundtrack. The album peaked at No. 2 on the Billboard 200 and achieved a double-platinum certification from the Recording Industry Association of America (RIAA). The group remained signed to Death Row Records until 1999, releasing the platinum-certified collaborative album Still I Rise with 2Pac, which peaked at No. 6 on the Billboard 200. Following this release, they established their own imprint, Outlaw Recordz, and issued Ride wit Us or Collide wit Us in 2000.

Napoleon and Kastro departed the group in 2005 and 2009 respectively. Hussein Fatal briefly distanced himself from the group throughout this entire period due to internal disagreements regarding the protective measures surrounding Shakur and the group's subsequent signing with Death Row Records. He later rejoined the latest lineup E.D.I Mean and Young Noble in 2010 to record Perfect Timing (2011). Fatal died in a vehicular accident in Banks County, Georgia, on July 10, 2015. While Big Syke died of natural causes at his home in Hawthorne, California, on December 5, 2016.

On July 4, 2025, long-term member Young Noble died by suicide in Atlanta, Georgia, effectively marking the conclusion of the group's active timeline.

== Former members ==
- Tupac Amaru Shakur (alias: Makaveli) – Original leader of the collective, known as "The Don". Named after Niccolò Machiavelli. Murdered in September 1996 at age 25.
- Yafeu Akiyele Fula (alias: Yaki Kadafi) – Shakur's godbrother, known as "The Prince". Named after Muammar Gaddafi. Shot dead in November 1996 at age 19.
- Malcolm Greenidge (alias: E.D.I Mean) – Named after Idi Amin. A founding member of Dramacydal, he contributed to the group's entire discography and numerous solo projects. Also, he produced some of 2Pac's posthumous songs.
- Katari Terrance Cox (alias: K.Kastro) – Shakur's cousin, named after Fidel Castro. A core member who contributed to albums such as Still I Rise, Ride wit Us or Collide wit Us, Novakane, and Outlaw 4 Life: 2005 A.P. and Can't Sell Dope Forever. He left the group in 2009.
- Rufus Cooper III (alias: Young Noble) – The final member added during Shakur's lifetime, featured extensively on The Don Killuminati: The 7 Day Theory. One of the main members, he actively participated in many projects throughout its existence. Died by suicide in 2025 at age 47.
- Mutah Wassin Shabazz Beale (alias: Napoleon) – Named after Napoleon Bonaparte. Featured on Still I Rise, Ride wit Us or Collide wit Us and Novakane before leaving the music industry in 2001 following his conversion to Islam.
- Bruce Edward Washington Jr. (alias: Hussein Fatal) – The Lieutenant, named after Saddam Hussein. Departed shortly after Shakur's death, he focused on solo career, released his debut album In the Line of Fire and made featured appearances. Rejoined years later, in 2010 to record Perfect Timing. Died in a car accident in 2015 at age 42.
- Donna Harkness (alias: Storm) – The only female member of the collective, inducted in 1995. Featured on the All Eyez on Me album and various soundtracks such as Gang Related – The Soundtrack and Gridlock'd – The Soundtrack before departing after Shakur's death.

Other Members:

- Tyruss Gerald Himes (alias: Mussolini) – Former member of Thug Life, named after Benito Mussolini. Part of the initial 1995 lineup, he departed the group in early 1996. Died of natural causes in 2016 at age 48.
- Maurice Mutulu Shakur Jr. (alias: Mo' Komani) – Shakur's stepbrother and former Thug Life member, named after Ruhollah Khomeini. An initial member during the 1995 reformation who departed the label and collective in early 1996.
- ’’’ Kamil Beale ’’’ (Alias: ’’’Muszamil’’’) Called Kamillion by Tupac Shakur was the younger brother of original Outlawz member Napoleon and one of the closest proteges and affiliates of the collective. He passed away in early 2024 at age 43.
- ’’’ Ronald Moore ’’’ (Alias: ’’’Gonzoe’’’) Tupac Shakur gave him his Outlawz moniker name, Young Ritzy. Joined the group briefly in 1996. Died after he was shot in Seattle at age 45.
- ‘’‘ Sean Cole ’’’ (alias: ’’’Nutt-So’’’) a member who joined the group briefly on August of 1996 and collective /protege of Shakur who was discovered by MC Hammer and brother of the singer Keyshia Cole.
- ’’’ Allen Jordan ’’’ (Alias: ’’’Wack Deuce’’’) Death Row affiliate who joined the group briefly in 1996
- ’’’ Hassachi Jenkins ’’’ (Alias: ’’’H-Ryda’’’) Joined the group briefly in 1996
- ’’’ Wallace Lynch ’’’ (Alias: ’’’New Child’’’) Joined in 1999
- ’’‘ Courtney Sean Coleman’’’ (Alias: ’’’ Stormey Coleman’’’) Joined in 2005

== Discography ==
Studio albums

- Ride wit Us or Collide wit Us (2000)
- Novakane (2001)
- Neva Surrenda: The Rap-A-Lot Sessions (2002)
- Outlaw 4 Life: 2005 A.P. (2005)
- Retribution: The Lost Album (2006)
- Perfect Timing (2011)
- #LastOnezLeft (2017)

Collaborative albums

- Still I Rise (with 2Pac) (1999)

== Legacy ==
=== Books ===
- Life is Raw: The Story of a Reformed Outlaw by Napoleon
- Journey With an Outlaw by Hussein Fatal
- Spirit of an Outlaw: The Untold Story of Tupac Amaru Shakur and Yafeu "Kadafi" Fula by Yaasmyn Fula.
- The Homicide of Yafeu 'Yaki Kadafi' Fula by Yaasmyn Fula.
- Street Fame by E.D.I. Mean
- This Thug's Life by Komani

=== Documentaries ===
- 2002: Outlawz Worldwide
- 2015: Celebrity Crime Files (Season 4, Episode 10: "Outlawz and Yaki Kadafi")
- 2019: Napoleon: Life of an Outlaw
- 2026: Killing Fields: The Vindication of Yaki Kadafi
