= Mac Mall discography =

- Studio albums: 12
- Soundtrack albums: 1
- Compilation albums: 7
- Singles: 7
- Video albums: 1
- Mixtapes: 1

This is the discography of American hip hop recording artist Jamal "Mac Mall" Rocker from Vallejo, California.

== Studio albums ==
=== Solo albums ===
List of albums with selected chart positions
Title	Album details	Peak chart positions			
Title	Album details	US	US R&B	US Indie	US Heat.
Illegal Business?	Released: July 12, 1993; Label: Young Black Brotha Records	—	71	—	40
Untouchable	Released: April, 1996; Label: Relativity	35	6	—	—
Illegal Business? 2000	Released: March 23, 1999; Label: Don't Give Up Productions	185	54	—	7
Immaculate	Released: February 20, 2001; Label: Sesed Out Records	—	65	22	—
Mackin Speaks Louder Than Words	Released: July 30, 2002; Label: Sesed Out Records	—	—	—	—
Thizziana Stoned and the Temple of Shrooms	Released: September 19, 2006; Label: Thizz Entertainment	—	—	—	—
Mac to the Future	Released: August 18, 2009; Label: Thizz Entertainment	—	—	—	—
The Rebellion Against All There Is	Released: 2012; Label: Young Black Brotha Records	—	—	—	—
Macnifacence & Malliciousness	Released: 2014; Label: Young Black Brotha Records	—	—	—	—
Legal Business?	Released: 2015; Label: Thizz Entertainment	—	—	—	—
"—" denotes a recording that did not chart or was not released in that territory.

=== Collaboration albums ===
List of albums with selected chart positions
Title	Album details	Peak chart positions	
Title	Album details	US R&B	US Indie
Illegal Game (with JT the Bigga Figga)	Released: November 16, 2004; Label: Get Low Recordz	—	—
Da U.S. Open (with Mac Dre)	Released: 2005; Label: Thizz Entertainment	93	40
"—" denotes a recording that did not chart or was not released in that territory.

== Compilation albums ==
Year	Title
1999	Mallennium: Released: June 22, 1999; Label: Sesed Out Records
2002	Beware of Those Volume 2 (with JT the Bigga Figga): Released: 2002; Label: Imperial Entertainment
2003	Black Wall Street (with JT the Bigga Figga & Ray Luv): Released: 2003; Label: Black Wall Street, Inc.
2004	The Macuscript, Vol. 1: Released: September 21, 2004; Label: Sesed Out Records
2005	The Macuscript, Vol. 2: Released: August 23, 2005; Label: Sesed Out Records
2005	The Macuscript, Vol. 3: Released: September 20, 2005; Label: Sesed Out Records
2005	The Macuscript, Vol. 4: Released: October 18, 2005; Label: Sesed Out Records

=== Soundtrack albums ===
Year	Title
2000	Beware of Those (with JT the Bigga Figga): Released: 2000; Label: Get Low Recordz

== Mixtapes ==
Year	Title
2013	Return of the Mac (with DJ Fresh a.k.a. The World's Freshest): Released: October 22, 2013; Label: EMPIRE

== Singles ==
Released	Title
1994	"I Got's 2 Have It"
1994	"Sic Wit Tis"
1994	"Ghetto Theme"
1996	"Get Right" (#41 Hot Rap Songs)
1996	"Lets Get a Telly"
1999	"Wide Open"
2005	"Murda I Wrote"

=== Guest appearances ===
Title	Release	Other artist(s)	Album
"Dusted 'N' Disgusted"	1995	E-40, Spice 1, 2Pac, Levitti	In a Major Way
"Players Holiday"	1999	T.W.D.Y., Too Short, Otis & Shug	Derty Werk
