= 2005 in hip-hop =

This article summarizes the events, album releases, and album release dates in hip-hop for the year 2005.

== Released albums ==
Release Date	Artist	Album	Label
January 11	Various Artists	Coach Carter (soundtrack)	Capitol Records
January 18	The Game	The Documentary	Aftermath Entertainment, G-Unit Records, Interscope Records
January 25	Buck 65	This Right Here Is Buck 65	V2 Records
January 25	Geto Boys	The Foundation	Rap-a-Lot Records, Asylum Records
January 25	Paul Wall & Chamillionaire	Controversy Sells	Paid in Full Entertainment
January 25	Spice 1	Dyin' 2 Ball	Triple X Entertainment
January 31	Pete Rock	The Surviving Elements: From Soul Survivor II Sessions	BBE Records
February 8	Krayzie Bone	Gemini: Good vs. Evil	Ball'r Records, ThugLine Records
February 8	Mike Ladd	Negrophilia: The Album	
February 8	One Be Lo	S.O.N.O.G.R.A.M. (Sounds Of Nahshid Originate Good Rhymes And Music)	Subterraneous Records, Fat Beats Records
February 8	Rapper Big Pooh	Sleepers	6 Hole Records, Caroline Distribution
February 8	Sage Francis	A Healthy Distrust	Epitaph Records
February 15	Suburban Noize Records	Sub Noize Souljaz	Suburban Noize Records
February 22	A Gun Called Tension	A Gun Called Tension	Cold Crush Records
February 22	Aesop Rock	Fast Cars, Danger, Fire and Knives	Definitive Jux
February 22	Bone Brothers	Bone Brothers	Koch Records
February 22	Busdriver	Fear of a Black Tangent	Mush Records
February 22	Death Row Records	The Very Best of Death Row	Death Row Records, Koch Records
February 22	Jumpsteady	Master of the Flying Guillotine	Psychopathic Records
February 22	Sole	Live from Rome	Anticon
February 22	TRU	The Truth	The New No Limit Records, Koch Records
March 1	Pimp C	The Sweet James Jones Stories	Rap-a-Lot Records, Asylum Records
March 3	50 Cent	The Massacre	G-Unit Records, Shady Records, Aftermath Entertainment, Interscope Records
March 7	Sev Statik	Slow Burn	Pitch Control, Pointman
March 8	Boom Bip	Blue Eyed in the Red Room	Lex Records
March 8	Celly Cel	It'z Real Out Here	33rd Street Records
March 8	Tame One	O.G. Bobby Johnson	Eastern Conference Records
March 12	Evidence	Another Sound Mission Vol. 1	Audio Fidelity
March 15	Baby Bash	Super Saucy	Latium Records, Universal Records
March 22	Anybody Killa	Road Fools	Psychopathic Records
March 22	C-Murder	The Truest Shit I Ever Said	Bossalinie Records, Koch Records
March 22	M.I.A.	Arular	XL Recordings, Interscope Records
March 22	The Perceptionists	Black Dialogue	Definitive Jux
March 22	Prefuse 73	Surrounded By Silence	Warp Records
March 29	Blueprint	1988	Rhymesayers Entertainment
March 29	Beanie Sigel	The B. Coming	Dame Dash Music Group, Def Jam Recordings
March 29	Edan	Beauty and the Beat	Lewis Recordings
March 29	Fat Killahz	Guess Who's Coming to Dinner?	No Tyze Entertainment
March 29	The Game	West Coast Resurrection	FastLife Records, Get Low Recordz
March 29	Will Smith	Lost and Found	Interscope Records
April 12	Z-Ro	Let the Truth Be Told	Rap-a-Lot Records
April 19	Esham	A-1 Yola	Psychopathic Records
April 19	Mike Jones	Who is Mike Jones?	Swishahouse, Asylum Records, Warner Bros.
April 19	Roots Manuva	Awfully Deep	Big Dada
April 19	Zion I	True & Livin'	Live Up Records
April 26	Various Artists	XXX: State of the Union (soundtrack)	Jive Records
May 3	Quasimoto	The Further Adventures of Lord Quas	Stones Throw Records
May 3	13 & God	13 & God	Alien Transistor, Anticon
May 6	Nelly	Sweatsuit	Universal Records, Derrty Records, Fo' Reel Records
May 10	Fannypack	See You Next Tuesday	Tommy Boy Records
May 10	John Cena and Tha Trademarc	You Can't See Me	Columbia Records and WWE Music Group
May 10	Jus Allah	All Fates Have Changed	Babygrande Records
May 17	The Away Team	National Anthem	6 Hole Records, Caroline Distribution
May 17	Cowboy Troy	Loco Motive	Rawbaw, Warner Bros. Records
May 17	Insane Clown Posse	The Calm	Psychopathic Records
May 17	Memphis Bleek	534	Get Low Records, Roc-A-Fella Records, Def Jam Recordings
May 17	Nobody	And Everything Else...	Plug Research
May 24	Common	Be	GOOD Music, Geffen Records
May 24	Gorillaz	Demon Days	Virgin Records
May 24	Gucci Mane	Trap House	Big Cat Records
May 24	Pretty Ricky	Bluestars	Atlantic Records, Bluestar Entertainment
May 24	Sway & King Tech	Back 2 Basics	Bungalo Records
May 24	Various Artists	The Longest Yard (soundtrack)	Derrty Entertainment, Universal Records
May 24	Young Gunz	Brothers from Another	Roc-A-Fella Records, Def Jam Recordings
May 31	The High & Mighty	The 12th Man	Eastern Conference Records
May 31	M.E.D.	Push Comes to Shove	Stones Throw Records
May 31	Sean Price	Monkey Barz	Duck Down Music
May 31	Ya Boy	Rookie of the Year	SMC Recordings, Done Deal Entertainment
June 14	Afu-Ra	State of the Arts	Life Force Records, Decon Records
June 14	Fat Joe	All or Nothing	Terror Squad Productions, Atlantic Records
June 21	9th Wonder & Buckshot	Chemistry	Duck Down Music
June 21	Canibus	Mind Control	Tommy Boy Records
June 21	Guru	Version 7.0: The Street Scriptures	7 Grand Records
June 21	Ol' Dirty Bastard	A Son Unique	Dame Dash Music Group, UMG, Def Jam Recordings
June 27	Kano	Home Sweet Home	679 Artists
June 28	Bizarre	Hannicap Circus	Sanctuary Urban
June 28	Cassidy	I'm a Hustla	Full Surface Records, J Records
June 28	Twiztid	Man's Myth (Vol. 1)	Psychopathic Records
June 28	Ying Yang Twins	USA (United State Of Atlanta)	TVT Records
July 4	Missy Elliott	The Cookbook	The Goldmind Inc., Atlantic Records
July 5	Webbie	Savage Life	Trill, Asylum Records, Atlantic Records
July 12	Felt	Felt, Vol. 2: A Tribute to Lisa Bonet	Rhymesayers Entertainment
July 12	Frayser Boy	Me Being Me	Hypnotize Minds Productions
July 12	Slim Thug	Already Platinum	Star Trak Entertainment, Geffen Records
July 12	Bow Wow	Wanted	Columbia Records, Sony Urban Music
July 12	Various Artists	Hustle & Flow (soundtrack)	Grand Hustle Records, Atlantic Records
July 19	Jermaine Dupri	Young, Fly & Flashy, Vol. 1	So So Def Recordings, Virgin Records
July 26	Buck 65	Secret House Against the World	WEA
July 26	The Game	Untold Story, Vol. 2	FastLife Records, Get Low Recordz
July 26	Young Jeezy	Let's Get It: Thug Motivation 101	CTE World, Def Jam Recordings
July 26	Trey Songz	I Gotta Make It	Atlantic Records
July 26	Twiztid	Mutant (Vol. 2)	Psychopathic Records
July 26	7L & Esoteric	Moment of Rarities	Babygrande Records
July 26	Various Artists	The Source Presents: Hip Hop Hits, Vol. 10	Image Entertainment
August 2	Necro	The Sexorcist	Psycho+Logical-Records
August 9	Kool Keith	The Lost Masters, Vol. 2	DMAFT Records
August 9	Proof	Searching for Jerry Garcia	Iron Fist Records
August 16	Vanilla Ice	Platinum Underground	Ultrax Records
August 16	Pras Michel	Win Lose Or Draw	Universal Music Group
August 23	Jim Jones	Harlem: Diary of a Summer	Diplomat Records, Koch Records
August 23	Kurupt	Against the Grain	Death Row Records, Koch Records
August 23	Pumpkinhead	Orange Moon Over Brooklyn	Soulspazm Records, Rawkus Records
August 23	Skrapz	The 12 Step Program	Genetic Soil LLC
August 30	Kanye West	Late Registration	Roc-A-Fella Records, Def Jam Recordings
August 30	Tony Yayo	Thoughts of a Predicate Felon	G-Unit Records, Interscope Records, Money Management
September 6	AZ	A.W.O.L.	Quiet Money Records
September 13	Big Shug	Who's Hard?	Sure Shot Recordings
September 13	DJ Quik	Trauma	Mad Science Records
September 13	Little Brother	The Minstrel Show	ABB Records, Atlantic Records
September 13	Paul Wall	The Peoples Champ	Swishahouse, Asylum Records, Atlantic Records
September 13	Smif-n-Wessun	Smif 'n' Wessun: Reloaded	Duck Down Music
September 13	U-God	Mr. Xcitement	Free Agency Recordings
September 20	Cage	Hell's Winter	Definitive Jux
September 20	David Banner	Certified	SRC Records, Universal Records
September 20	Pimp Squad Click	25 to Life	Grand Hustle Records, Atlantic Records
September 26	Why?	Elephant Eyelash	Anticon
September 27	Bizzy Bone	Speaking in Tongues	845 Entertainment
September 27	Blackalicious	The Craft	Anti-
September 27	Three 6 Mafia	Most Known Unknown	Hypnotize Minds Productions, Sony Urban Music, Columbia Records
September 27	Lil' Kim	The Naked Truth	International Rock Star Records, Atlantic Records
September 28	Snoop Dogg	Snoopified	Priority Records, EMI Group Limited
October 3	Ms. Dynamite	Judgement Days	Polydor Records
October 3	2Pac	The Prophet Returns	Death Row Records, Koch Records
October 4	Silkk the Shocker	The Best of Silkk the Shocker	Priority Records
October 4	Twista	The Day After	Atlantic Records
October 4	Atmosphere	You Can't Imagine How Much Fun We're Having	Rhymesayers Entertainment
October 4	C-Murder	The Best of C-Murder	Priority Records
October 4	Spice 1	The Truth	High Powered Entertainment
October 4	Tragedy Khadafi	Thug Matrix	Fastlife Records
October 6	DJ Muggs and GZA	Grandmasters	Angeles Records
October 11	DANGERDOOM	The Mouse and the Mask	Epitaph Records
October 11	Warren G	In the Mid-Nite Hour	G-Funk Entertainment
October 18	Black Milk	Sound of the City	Music House, Fat Beats
October 18	Bun B	Trill	Rap-a-Lot Records, Asylum Records
October 18	Circle of Tyrants	The Circle of Tyrants	Psycho+Logical-Records
October 18	Ninja High School	Young Adults Against Suicide	Tomlab
October 18	Rev. Run	Distortion	Def Jam Recordings
October 18	M.O.P.	St. Marxmen	Koch Records
October 18	Wu-Tang Clan and Various Artists	Wu-Tang Meets the Indie Culture	Think Differently, Babygrande Records
October 25	Suburban Noize Records	SRH Presents: Supporting Radical Habits	Suburban Noize Records
November	Various Artists	50 Cent: Bulletproof (soundtrack)	G-Unit Records, Shadyville Records
November 1	Canibus	Hip-Hop for Sale	Babygrande Records
November 1	Fatlip	The Loneliest Punk	Delicious Vinyl
November 1	Public Enemy	New Whirl Odor	Slam Jamz Records
November 1	Tha Dogg Pound	Dillinger & Young Gotti II: Tha Saga Continuez...	Gangsta Advisory Records
November 7	Beastie Boys	Solid Gold Hits	Capitol Records
November 8	Bigg Jus	Poor People's Day	Mush Records
November 8	D4L	Down for Life	Dee Money, Asylum Records, Atlantic Records
November 8	G-Unit Records	Get Rich or Die Tryin' (soundtrack)	Interscope Records, G-Unit Records
November 8	Lil' Romeo	Romeo! The TV Show (soundtrack)	The New No Limit Records, Koch Records
November 8	Sheek Louch	After Taxes	D-Block Records, Koch Records
November 15	Mike Ladd	Father Divine	ROIR Records
November 15	Pitbull	Money Is Still a Major Issue	TVT Records
November 22	Fort Minor	The Rising Tied	Machine Shop Records, Warner Bros. Records
November 22	Talib Kweli	Right About Now	Koch Records
November 22	Chamillionaire	The Sound of Revenge	Universal Music Group
November 22	Juelz Santana	What the Game's Been Missing!	Diplomat Records, Roc-A-Fella Records, Def Jam Recordings
November 22	Rich Boyz	Young Ballers: The Hood Been Good to Us	Guttar Music
December 6	Eminem	Curtain Call: The Hits	Shady Records, Aftermath Entertainment, Interscope Records, Web Entertainment
December 6	Flame	Rewind	Cross Movement Records
December 6	Funkmaster Flex	Car Show Tour	Koch Records
December 6	Ja Rule	Exodus	Murder Inc. Records, Def Jam Recordings
December 6	Lil Wayne	Tha Carter II	Cash Money Records, Universal Records
December 13	Ludacris & Disturbing tha Peace	Disturbing tha Peace	Disturbing tha Peace, Def Jam South
December 13	Snoop Dogg	Bigg Snoop Dogg Presents...Welcome to tha Chuuch: Da Album	Doggystyle Records, Koch Records
December 13	Rawkus Records	Best of Decade I: 1995–2005	Geffen Records, Rawkus Records
December 20	The Notorious B.I.G.	Duets: The Final Chapter	Bad Boy Records, Atlantic Records
December 26	DJ Smallz & Stat Quo	The Road To Statlanta	All Love
December 27	Trick-Trick	The People vs.	Motown Records, WonderBoy Entertainment

== Highest-charting singles ==
Hip hop singles from any year which charted in the 2005 Top 40 of the Billboard Hot 100
Song	Artist	Project	Peak position
"Gold Digger"	Kanye West featuring Jamie Foxx	Late Registration	1
"Candy Shop"	50 Cent featuring Olivia	The Massacre	1
"Hate It Or Love It"	The Game featuring 50 Cent	The Documentary	2
"Disco Inferno"	50 Cent	The Massacre	3
"Just a Lil Bit"	50 Cent	The Massacre	3
"How We Do"	The Game featuring 50 Cent	The Documentary	4
"Soul Survivor"	Young Jeezy featuring Akon	Let's Get It: Thug Motivation 101	4
"Outta Control (Remix)"	50 Cent featuring Mobb Deep	The Massacre & Blood Money	6
"Grind With Me"	Pretty Ricky	Bluestars	7
"When I'm Gone"	Eminem	Curtain Call: The Hits	8
"Get It Poppin'"	Fat Joe featuring Nelly	All or Nothing	9
"Bring Em Out"	T.I.	Urban Legend	9
"Mockingbird"	Eminem	Encore	11
"Your Body"	Pretty Ricky	Bluestars	12
"Stay Fly"	Three 6 Mafia featuring Young Buck & 8Ball & MJG	Most Known Unknown	13
"Girl Tonite"	Twista featuring Trey Songz	The Day After	14
"I Think They Like Me"	Dem Franchize Boyz featuring Jermaine Dupri, Da Brat & Bow Wow	Young, Fly & Flashy, Vol. 1	15
"Wait (The Whisper Song)"	Ying Yang Twins	U.S.A. (United State of Atlanta)	15
"Karma"	Lloyd Banks featuring Avant	The Hunger For More	17
"Shorty Wanna Ride"	Young Buck	Straight Outta Cashville	17
"Window Shopper"	50 Cent	Get Rich or Die Tryin' (soundtrack)	20
"Sugar (Gimme Some)"	Trick Daddy featuring Ludacris, Lil Kim & Cee-Lo Green	Thug Matrimony: Married to the Streets	20
"U Don't Know Me"	T.I.	Urban Legend	23
"Errtime"	Nelly featuring Jung Tru & King Jacob	The Longest Yard (soundtrack)	24
"Encore"	Eminem, Dr. Dre & 50 Cent	Encore	25
"Heard 'Em Say"	Kanye West featuring Adam Levine	Late Registration	26
"New York"	Ja Rule featuring Fat Joe & Jadakiss	R.U.L.E.	27
"Badd"	Ying Yang Twins featuring Mike Jones & Mr. ColliPark	U.S.A. (United State of Atlanta)	29
"Hope"	Twista featuring Faith Evans	Coach Carter (soundtrack)	31
"Fireman"	Lil Wayne	Tha Carter II	32
"Dreams"	The Game	The Documentary	32
"Like Toy Soldiers"	Eminem	Encore	34

== Highest first-week sales ==
List of top ten albums with the highest first-week
Number	Album	Artist	1st-week sales	1st-week position	Refs
1	The Massacre	50 Cent	1,140,000	1	
2	Late Registration	Kanye West	860,000	1	
3	The Documentary	The Game	586,000	1	
4	Curtain Call: The Hits	Eminem	441,000	1	
5	Get Rich Or Die Tryin' OST	G-Unit Records	317,000	2	
6	Tha Carter II	Lil Wayne	240,000	2	
7	Thoughts Of A Predicate Felon	Tony Yayo	214,000	2	
8	U.S.A. (United State of Atlanta)	Ying Yang Twins	201,000	2	
9	Be	Common	185,000	2	
10	Who Is Mike Jones?	Mike Jones	181,000	3	

== Highest critically reviewed albums (Metacritic) ==
Number	Artist	Album	Average score	Number of reviews	Reference
1	M.I.A.	Arular	88	33 reviews	
2	Kanye West	Late Registration	85	31 reviews	
3	Edan	Beauty And The Beat	85	18 reviews	
4	Common	Be	83	26 reviews	
5	Gorillaz	Demon Days	82	37 reviews	
6	DangerDoom	The Mouse And The Mask	81	34 reviews	
7	Blackalicious	The Craft	80	22 reviews	
8	13 & God	13 & God	80	20 reviews	
9	Roots Manuva	Awfully Deep	80	19 reviews	
10	Quasimoto	The Further Adventures of Lord Quas	79	23 reviews	

== See also ==
- Previous article: 2004 in hip-hop
- Next article: 2006 in hip-hop
