= Hustle Relentless =

Studio album by JT the Bigga Figga
- Released: October 1, 2002
- Recorded: 2002
- Genres: Gangsta rap; hardcore hip hop; West Coast hip hop
- Label: Get Low
- Producers: JT the Bigga Figga; Sean T

JT the Bigga Figga chronology
Know About It (2002)	Hustle Relentless (2002)	Street Warz (2002)

Hustle Relentless is the fourteenth studio album by American rapper, JT the Bigga Figga. The album was released on October 1, 2002 for Get Low Recordz and was produced by JT the Bigga Figga and Sean T.

== Track listing ==
1. "Intro" – 1:42
2. "Neighborhood Supastarz" (featuring The Game) – 3:28
3. "Peace Not War" (featuring Young Noble and Tha Gamblaz) – 4:14
4. "JT Skit"- 0:11
5. "Conspiracy" (featuring Guce, Cozmo & Mississippi) – 4:17
6. "On the Run" (featuring Cozmo and Big Rich) – 3:04
7. "Millionaire Pirates" (featuring San Quinn and Ive Low) – 4:06
8. "Just Hustlin'" – 4:12
9. "Know About It" (featuring Tha Commissiona and Telly Mac) – 3:53
10. "The Old Days" (featuring San Quinn and Authentic) – 4:21
11. "California" (featuring Ray Luv and Sean T) – 4:00
12. "Otherside of the Game 2" (featuring San Quinn and Ive Low) – 4:13
13. "Custom Timz" (featuring D-Moe) – 2:35
14. "All the Above" – 3:27
15. "457 Representaz" – 4:18
16. "Freestyle" – 2:30
17. "Exclusively" – 4:31
