= Bay Area Bosses =

Compilation album by various artists
- Released: July 10, 2001
- Recorded: 2001
- Genres: Gangsta rap; hardcore hip hop; West Coast hip hop
- Label: Get Low
- Producers: JT the Bigga Figga; Tha Gamblaz; Guce

JT the Bigga Figga chronology
Game for Sale (2001)	Bay Area Bosses (2001)	Street Warz (2002)

Bay Area Bosses is a hip hop compilation album presented by JT the Bigga Figga. It was released on July 10, 2002 by Get Low Recordz.

== Track listing ==
1. "Hustle Relentless"- 3:27 (JT the Bigga Figga)
2. "Get You Lit"- 4:35 (Keak Da Sneak)
3. "Ghetto Slums"- 5:19 (C-Bo, JT the Bigga Figga, Phats Bossi, Fed-X, Ampachino)
4. "Bossin' Up"- 4:12 (Mac Mall)
5. "Livin Beyond Means"- 3:46 (Sean T, M.O.G. Stunt Team, Mississippi)
6. "Handle It"- 3:48 (Joi Patrice)
7. "457"- 4:08 (Tha Gamblaz)
8. "Hold It Down"- 5:27 (Killa Tay, Cosmo, H2O)
9. "Lil' Shop of Horrors"- 4:21 (Guce, Mobilotti)
10. "Matter of Time"- 4:48 (Yukmouth, Tha Jet)
11. "Retaliation Come Quick"- 4:06 (San Quinn, Tha Gamblaz)
12. "What You Want?"- 4:57 (Messy Marv)
13. "Swiss Accounts"- 4:18 (Mob Figaz)
14. "Mind on My Money"- 3:30 (JT The Bigga Figga, Tha Gamblaz, Joi Patrice)
