= New Jersey Drive, Vol. 1 =

Soundtrack album by various artists
- Released: March 28, 1995
- Recorded: 1994–1995
- Genre: Hip hop
- Length: 1:16:22
- Label: Tommy Boy
- Producer: Nick Gomez (exec.); Monica Lynch (exec.); Easy Mo Bee; Eric "Kenya" Baker; Erick Sermon; Frankie Beverly; Giovanni Salah; Khayree; LoRider; Marley Marl; MC Eiht; Mike "Nice" Barrel; Organized Noize; Queen Latifah; Redman; Sean "Puffy" Combs; Tracy Stuckey; The LG Experience; T-Ray; Wino

New Jersey Drive soundtrack chronology
New Jersey Drive, Vol. 1 (1995)	New Jersey Drive, Vol. 2 (1995)

Singles from New Jersey, Vol. 1
- 1. "Can't You See" Released: March 11, 1995; 2. "All About My Fetti" Released: May 13, 1995; 3. "Don't Shut Down on a Player" Released: 1995

Professional ratings
Review scores
Source	Rating
AllMusic	2.5/5 stars

New Jersey Drive, Vol. 1 (Original Motion Picture Soundtrack) is the first of two soundtracks to Nick Gomez' 1995 film New Jersey Drive. It was released on March 28, 1995 through Tommy Boy Records, and consists of hip hop music. Composed of seventeen songs, the album features performances by Blak Panta, Coolio, Heavy D, Ill Al Skratch, Keith Murray, Mac Mall, Maze, MC Eiht, Lords of the Underground, The Notorious B.I.G., Outkast, Poets of Darkness, Queen Latifah, Ray Luv, Redman, Sabelle, Smooth, Total, Undacova, and Young Lay. Production was handled by several hip hop's top producers, including Puff Daddy, Erick Sermon, Easy Mo Bee and Marley Marl.

The album found a great deal of success, making it to #22 on the Billboard 200 and #3 on the Top R&B/Hip-Hop Albums, and spawned the certified gold single "Can't You See" which launched the career of popular 90's girl group Total. On June 6, 1995 the soundtrack was certified gold by the RIAA.

New Jersey Drive, Vol. 2 was released on April 11, 1995.

== Track listing ==
No.	Title	Producer(s)	Length
1.	"Don't Shut Down on a Player" (Ill Al Skratch)	The LG Experience; LoRider	3:25
2.	"Where Am I?" (Redman)	Redman	5:40
3.	"Do What U Want" (Blak Panta)	Mike "Nice" Barrel; Brent Toussaint (add.); Danett Levy (add.)	4:22
4.	"Old Thing" (Sabelle)	Giovanni Salah	4:12
5.	"All About My Fetti" (Young Lay featuring Mac Mall and Ray Luv)	Khayree	6:24
6.	"Can't You See" (Total featuring The Notorious B.I.G.)	Sean "Puffy" Combs	4:52
7.	"Burn Rubber" (Lords of the Underground)	Marley Marl	4:30
8.	"21 In the Ghetto" (Poets of Darkness)	Tracy Stuckey; 69 aka Satan (co.)	3:49
9.	"Love Slave" (Undacova)	T-Ray	4:30
10.	"Benz or Beamer" (Outkast)	Organized Noize	4:15
11.	"Check It Out" (Heavy D)	Easy Mo Bee	4:18
12.	"Jersey" (Queen Latifah)	Queen Latifah	4:53
13.	"East Left" (Keith Murray)	Erick Sermon	3:30
14.	"Ain't Nuthin' But Killin'" (MC Eiht)	MC Eiht	5:01
15.	"Thru the Window" (Coolio)	Wino	3:29
16.	"Before I Let Go" (Maze featuring Frankie Beverly)	Frankie Beverly	5:03
17.	"One and Only" (Smooth)	Eric "Kenya" Baker	4:09
Total length:			1:16:22

== Charts ==
=== Weekly charts ===
Chart (1995)	Peak position
US Billboard 200	22
US Top R&B/Hip-Hop Albums (Billboard)	3

=== Year-end charts ===
Chart (1995)	Position
US Billboard 200	196
US Top R&B/Hip-Hop Albums (Billboard)	40

== Certifications ==
Region	Certification	Certified units/sales
United States (RIAA)	Gold	500,000^{^}
^{^} Shipments figures based on certification alone.
