= Neighborhood Supastarz =

Compilation album by JT the Bigga Figga
- Released: August 9, 2005
- Recorded: 2005
- Genres: Gangsta rap; hardcore hip hop; West Coast hip hop
- Label: Get Low
- Producer: JT the Bigga Figga

JT the Bigga Figga chronology
Illegal Game (2004)	Neighborhood Supastarz (2005)	Who Grind Like Us? (2005)

Professional ratings
Review scores
Source	Rating
Allmusic	3/5 stars

Neighborhood Supastarz is the 17th album by rapper, JT the Bigga Figga. The album was released on August 9, 2005, for Get Low Recordz and was produced by JT the Bigga Figga. The album featured many of JT the Bigga Figga's discoveries and associates such as The Game, Juvenile, Young Buck, E-40 and Daz Dillinger.

== Track listing ==
1. "When Shit Get Thick" (featuring The Game, Sean T) – 3:19
2. "Ceo Stacks" (featuring Juvenile, Phats Bossi) – 4:04
3. "Mobb with This" – 2:57
4. "Gotta Get It" (featuring Young Buck, Juvenile) – 3:39
5. "Independent Bubble" (featuring E-40, Daz Dillinger) – 3:00
6. "Neighborhood Supastarz" (featuring The Game) – 2:07
7. "Mind on My Money" (featuring Tha Gamblaz, Joi Patrice) – 3:29
8. "Street Warz" featuring Young Noble, Cozmo) – 3:57
9. "Dangerous Minds" (featuring Juvenile, Skip) – 4:20
10. "Ghetto Slums" (featuring C-Bo, Phats Bossi) – 4:55
11. "Conspiracy" (featuring Gucci, Cozmo) – 3:41
12. "Who Got My Back" (featuring Daz Dillinger, Telly Mac) – 4:13
13. "Just Hustlin'" – 3:50
