= Dwellin' in tha Labb =

Studio album by JT the Bigga Figga
- Released: October 10, 1995
- Recorded: 1994–1995
- Studio: The Get Low Labb
- Genre: West Coast hip hop; G-funk; gangsta rap; underground hip hop
- Length: 58:41
- Label: Get Low Recordz; Straight Out Tha Labb Entertainment
- Producer: Rack Skerz (exec.); JT the Bigga Figga (also exec.); "G-Man" Stan Keith

JT the Bigga Figga chronology
Playaz N the Game (1993)	Dwellin' in tha Labb (1995)	Game Tight (1998)

Singles from Dwellin' in tha Labb
- 1. "Dwellin' in the Labb" Released: 1995

Professional ratings
Review scores
Source	Rating
AllMusic	3.5/5 stars

Dwellin' in tha Labb is the third solo full-length album by American rapper and producer JT the Bigga Figga from San Francisco. It was released on October 10, 1995 through Get Low Recordz and Straight Out Tha Labb Entertainment with distribution by Priority Records. The album features guest appearances from 11/5, Andre "Herm" Lewis, Black C, Celly Cel, Cougnut, E-40, Get Low Playaz, Mac Mall, Master P, Pizzo, San Quinn, Seff tha Gaffla, The Delinquents, The Link Crew and Trev-G.

The album peaked at number 168 on the Billboard 200, at number 24 on the Top R&B/Hip-Hop Albums and at number 9 on the Heatseekers Albums in the United States, making it JT's most successful project to date. Its lead single, a self-titled track "Dwellin' in the Lab", made it to number 39 on the Hot Rap Songs chart.

It was re-released in 2000 via Get Low Recordz and in 2006 via SMC Recordings.

== Track listing ==
All music is composed by JT the Bigga Figga, except track 5 produced with G-Man Stan and tracks 2 and 3 produced by his cousin LeShaun Smith.

No.	Title	Length
1.	"Critical"	2:12
2.	"The Mack Hand"	4:15
3.	"Dwellin' in tha Labb"	3:45
4.	"Beware of Those" (featuring Celly Cel & E-40)	5:00
5.	"Ain't Something Wrong"	3:57
6.	"It's Going Down"	4:30
7.	"Representing" (featuring Get Low Playaz)	5:43
8.	"Scrilla, Scratch, Paper" (featuring Cougnut & 11/5)	4:57
9.	"Root of All Evil" (featuring Rappin' 4-Tay & San Quinn)	5:43
10.	"Bay Area Playaz" (featuring Master P, Mac Mall, The Delinquents, Ray Luv, Seff tha Gaffla, Black C, Pizzo, Tha Link & Trev-G)	5:15
11.	"Did You Get Yo Geez"	3:56
12.	"Young G's and OG's" (featuring Herm)	2:15
13.	"Lost in a Massacarade"	3:25
14.	"Flypn' Nyhaz Lyke Ounces"	3:48
Total length:		58:41

== Charts ==
Chart (1995)	Peak position
US Billboard 200	168
US Top R&B/Hip-Hop Albums (Billboard)	24
US Heatseekers Albums (Billboard)	9
