= Playaz N the Game =

Studio album by JT the Bigga Figga
- Released: July 13, 1993
- Genre: Hip hop
- Length: 45:06
- Label: Get Low Recordz
- Producer: JT the Bigga Figga; Gregg

JT the Bigga Figga chronology
Don't Stop 'Til We Major (1991)	Playaz N the Game (1993)	Dwellin' in tha Labb (1994)

Professional ratings
Review scores
Source	Rating
AllMusic	2.5/5 stars

Playaz N the Game is the second solo full-length album by American rapper and producer JT the Bigga Figga from San Francisco. It was released on July 13, 1993, through Get Low Recordz, making it the debut for both JT and the indie label. The album features guest appearances from D-Moe, Gigolo G, Mac Mall, Rappin' 4-Tay and San Quinn.

The album was not a commercial success when it first came out, but today the album is considered as a classic. Playaz N the Game charted at 91 on the Top R&B/Hip-Hop Albums and the two singles released, "Peep Game" and "Game Recognize Game" did not make it to the charts, but the latter received frequent airplay on the local hip-hop station, Wild 107.7.

The album was reissued via Get Low Recordz in 1996 with distribution by Priority Records and in 2006 via with distribution by SMC Recordings.

== Track listing ==
No.	Title	Length
1.	"It's About That Time"	4:29
2.	"Peep Game" (featuring D-Moe)	3:41
3.	"Game Recognize Game" (featuring Mac Mall)	3:52
4.	"Mr. Millimeter"	3:33
5.	"Out 2 Get Cha" (featuring D-Moe)	2:25
6.	"Did You Get the Dank" (featuring Rappin' 4-Tay)	4:24
7.	"The Whole Thang"	3:25
8.	"The Paper Chaser"	3:48
9.	"Back to the Shit" (featuring San Quinn & D-Moe)	3:41
10.	"Doin' Dirt" (featuring Gigolo G)	3:38
11.	"Foul From the Start"	3:24
12.	"You Can't Play a Playa"	4:21
Total length:		45:06

== Charts ==
Chart (1993)	Peak position
US Top R&B/Hip-Hop Albums (Billboard)	91
