= Untold Story (album) =

Compilation album by The Game
- Released: October 5, 2004
- Recorded: 2001–2002
- Genres: West Coast hip hop; gangsta rap; hardcore hip hop
- Length: 58:07 (standard edition); 1:28:10 (special edition)
- Label: Get Low
- Producers: JT the Bigga Figga (also exec.); Charlie-O; Sean T; T-Wayne

The Game chronology
Untold Story (2004)	The Documentary (2005)

Untold Story is an independently released compilation album by American rapper the Game. It was released on October 5, 2004 by Get Low Recordz. The album features guest appearances from Sean T and JT the Bigga Figga, among others.

A sequel to the album, titled Untold Story, Vol. 2, released the following year.

== Critical reception ==
Professional ratings
Review scores
Source	Rating
AllMusic	3/5 stars
RapReviews	7/10 stars
HipHopPlus	6.5/10 stars

Untold Story was met with mixed reviews from music critics. While his technical abilities and personality were praised, his lyrics, production and similarities to contemporaries such as Daz Dillinger and Lloyd Banks were criticized.

== Commercial performance ==
Untold Story debuted at 146 on the Billboard 200 chart, with approximately 8,000 copies sold in its first week. As of 2005, it had sold 82,000 copies in the United States.

== Track listing ==
Untold Story standard edition
No.	Title	Producer(s)	Length
1.	"Intro" (featuring JT the Bigga Figga)	Charlie-O; T-Wayne	1:03
2.	"Neighborhood Supa Starz" (featuring JT the Bigga Figga)	Charlie-O; T-Wayne	3:52
3.	"When Shit Get Thick" (featuring Sean T and JT the Bigga Figga)	Sean T	3:15
4.	"I'm Looking" (featuring Blue Chip)	Sean T	3:27
5.	"Real Gangstaz"	Sean T	4:00
6.	"Drama Is Real" (featuring San Quinn)	Sean T	3:38
7.	"Compton 2 Fillmore" (featuring JT the Bigga Figga)	Sean T	3:52
8.	"El Presidente" (featuring Telly Mac)	Sean T	4:02
9.	"G.A.M.E." (featuring Young Noble)	Sean T	3:27
10.	"Cali Boyz"	Sean T	1:49
11.	"Who the Illest" (featuring Sean T)	Sean T	4:10
12.	"Bleek Is..."	Sean T	3:46
13.	"Street Kings" (featuring Get Low Playaz)	Sean T	4:55
14.	"Don't Cry" (featuring Blue Chip)	Sean T	3:39
15.	"Exclusively" (featuring Get Low Playaz and Young Noble)	Sean T	4:28
16.	"Compton Compton"	Sean T	3:38
17.	"Outro" (featuring JT the Bigga Figga)	Charlie-O; T-Wayne	1:06
Total length:			58:07

Digital Reissue Bonus Tracks
No.	Title	Producer(s)	Length
18.	"Troublesome"	Sean T; JT the Bigga Figga	3:14
19.	"We Gangsta" (featuring Sean T)	Sean T	3:40
20.	"Put It In the Air"	Sean T; JT the Bigga Figga	3:40
Total length:			1:08:41

Untold Story special edition disc 2
No.	Title	Length
1.	"Documentary DVD"	30:03
Total length:		1:28:10

== Charts ==
=== Weekly charts ===
Weekly chart performance for Untold Story
Chart (2004)	Peak position
US Billboard 200	146
US Top R&B/Hip-Hop Albums (Billboard)	29
US Independent Albums (Billboard)	12
US Heatseekers Albums (Billboard)	6

Weekly chart performance for Untold Story
Chart (2005)	Peak position
US Billboard 200	191
US Top R&B/Hip-Hop Albums (Billboard)	78
US Independent Albums (Billboard)	27
