= Something Crucial =

Studio album by JT the Bigga Figga
- Released: September 28, 1999
- Recorded: 1999
- Genres: Gangsta rap; hardcore hip hop; West Coast hip hop
- Label: Get Low
- Producers: JT the Bigga Figga; Zaytoven

JT the Bigga Figga chronology
Game Tight (1998)	Something Crucial (1999)	Puttin' It on the Map (2000)

Something Crucial is the fifth album by rapper JT the Bigga Figga, his first of several released in 1999. The album was released on September 28, 1999 for Get Low Recordz and was produced by JT the Bigga Figga.

== Track listing ==
1. "Mob Wit' This" – 3:00
2. "Thug in Me" (featuring Steady Mobb'n & Killa Tay) – 4:07
3. "Another Episode" – 4:41
4. "Certified" (featuring Killa Tay, Guce & AP9) – 4:23
5. "Fedi Can't Buy You Love" (featuring Mykatan) – 4:34
6. "The Hidden Hand" (featuring The Commisiona & Dame) – 4:45
7. "Something Crucial" (featuring Sigmen) – 4:18
8. "Too Fly for Me" (featuring Miss Mocha) – 3:56
9. "Beware of Those" (featuring Mac Mall & Yukmouth) – 3:53
10. "Get Low Anthem" (featuring Gamblaz) – 4:38
11. "Don't Get It Twisted" – 3:49
12. "Beating Prophecy" (featuring San Quinn, Brotha John & Shug) – 4:47
