= West Coast Resurrection =

Compilation album by the Game
- Released: March 29, 2005
- Recorded: 2002
- Genre: West Coast hip hop; gangsta rap; hardcore hip hop
- Length: 62:59
- Label: FastLife, Get Low
- Producer: JT the Bigga Figga (exec.); JT the Bigga Figga, Sean T, G-Man Stan

The Game chronology
| The Documentary (2005) | West Coast Resurrection (2005) | Untold Story, Vol. 2 (2005) |

Professional ratings
Review scores
| Source | Rating |
|---|---|
| AllMusic | 2/5 stars |
| Robert Christgau | (dud) |
| RapReviews | 6.5/10 |
| Vibe | 3/5 stars |

West Coast Resurrection is an independently released compilation album by American rapper the Game. It was released on March 29, 2005, via Get Low Recordz. It was produced by JT the Bigga Figga, Sean T, and G-Man Stan.

The album was more successful than his previous independent release, Untold Story, peaking at #53 on the Billboard 200, #24 on the Top R&B/Hip-Hop Albums, and #2 on the Independent Albums charts.

== Critical reception ==
Entertainment Weekly praised "Promised Land," writing: "Built on an exquisitely soulful boom-bap beat, the song is an engaging sneak peek at an MC honing his nascent rhyme skills." Vibe called the album "a gritty look back at a rapper's first grasp at stardom."

== Track listing ==
| No. | Title | Producer(s) | Length |
|---|---|---|---|
| 1. | "Intro" (featuring JT the Bigga Figga) | --- | 1:16 |
| 2. | "The Streetz of Compton" (featuring JT the Bigga Figga) | Charlie O. & G Man Stan | 4:41 |
| 3. | "Blacksox" (featuring JT the Bigga Figga & Bluechip) | Charlie O. & G Man Stan | 3:59 |
| 4. | "Krush Groove" (featuring JT the Bigga Figga, Nina B & Get Low Playaz) | JT the Bigga Figga & Sean T | 3:24 |
| 5. | "Troublesome" | JT the Bigga Figga & Sean T | 4:39 |
| 6. | "Rookie Card" (featuring JT the Bigga Figga) | JT the Bigga Figga & Sean T | 2:22 |
| 7. | "Promised Land" | JT the Bigga Figga & Sean T | 4:16 |
| 8. | "Gutta Boyz" (featuring Sean T) | JT the Bigga Figga & Sean T | 3:37 |
| 9. | "Put It in the Air" (featuring Sky Balla) | JT the Bigga Figga & Sean T | 3:40 |
| 10. | "Desparados" (featuring JT the Bigga Figga) | JT the Bigga Figga & Sean T | 4:22 |
| 11. | "100 Barz and Gunnin'" | JT the Bigga Figga & Sean T | 1:14 |
| 12. | "Work Hard" (featuring JT the Bigga Figga, Bluechip, Nina B & Get Low Playaz) | JT the Bigga Figga & Sean T | 4:07 |
| 13. | "Untold Story" (featuring JT the Bigga Figga & Tee-Uk) | JT the Bigga Figga & Sean T | 2:56 |
| 14. | "Outro" ((featuring JT the Bigga Figga)) | --- | 2:48 |

== Charts ==
Chart performance for West Coast Resurrection
| Chart (2005) | Peak position |
|---|---|
| Canadian Albums (Nielsen SoundScan) | 42 |
| US Billboard 200 | 53 |
| US Independent Albums (Billboard) | 2 |
| US Top R&B/Hip-Hop Albums (Billboard) | 24 |
