= Game Tight Vol. 2 =

Game Tight Vol. 2: The Collaboration Album

Studio album by JT the Bigga Figga
- Released: 2003
- Recorded: 2003
- Genres: Gangsta rap; West Coast hip hop
- Label: Get Low
- Producers: JT the Bigga Figga; One Drop Scott; Rick Rock; Sean T; Tone Capone

JT the Bigga Figga chronology
The Mob Tales (2003)	Game Tight Vol. 2: The Collaboration Album (2003)	Fillmoe 2 San Jo (2004)

Game Tight Vol. 2: The Collaboration Album is a collaborative album by rapper JT the Bigga Figga. The album was released in 2003 for Get Low Recordz and was produced by JT the Bigga Figga, One Drop Scott, Rick Rock, Sean T, and Tone Capone.

== Track listing ==
No.	Title	Featuring	Length
1.	"Get Low Outlawz"	D-Moe, Double D, San Quinn, Telly Mac, & The Outlawz	4:14
2.	"Nothing Over My G'z"	C-Bo, Killa Tay	3:49
3.	"Snitchez"	Daz Dillinger, Sean T	3:02
4.	"Hustle-Matic"	Master P, Steady Mobbin	4:31
5.	"Countin' Money"	C-Bo, Killa Tay, Mac Mall, Marvaless, Pizzo	4:17
6.	"Pull Up A Seat"	Biaje, Tha Gamblaz	2:33
7.	"Held Up"	San Quinn, Sean T	4:04
8.	"Can We Ball?"	C-Bo, Killa Tay	3:43
9.	"Messy Situations"	Daz, Messy Marv	4:27
10.	"Count Time"	Daz, Telly Mac	2:40
11.	"Raided-R"	Raided-R	3:41
12.	"Cooking In The Kitchen"	Howie T	4:54
13.	"Federal Shit"	Killa Tay, Tha Gamblaz	3:36
14.	"World Wide Shit"	Seff Tha Gaffla	4:03
15.	"Bullys Wit Fullys"	Guce, Killa Tay	4:55
16.	"Independence With Elegance"	C.E.O., Tha Gamblaz	4:36
17.	"Ghetto Gumbo"	Coolio, Mac Dre	4:18
18.	"D1A, We Don't Play"	Cozmo, Tha Gamblaz	4:20
19.	"Thug Shit"	Killa Tay, Luni Coleone, Tha Gamblaz	5:14
