= Don't Stop til We Major =

Don't Stop 'Til We Major

Studio album by JT the Bigga Figga
- Released: September 10, 1992
- Recorded: 1990–1991
- Genre: West Coast hip hop; gangsta rap; underground hip hop
- Length: 56:28
- Label: Lil Daddy Records
- Producer: JT the Bigga Figga; "G-Man" Stan Keith; Rob; Gigolo G; Gregg

JT the Bigga Figga chronology
Don't Stop 'Til We Major (1992)	Playaz N the Game (1993)

Professional ratings
Review scores
Source	Rating
AllMusic	2.5/5 stars

Don't Stop 'Til We Major is the debut solo full-length album by American rapper and producer JT the Bigga Figga from San Francisco. It was released on September 10, 1992, through Lil Daddy Records, re-released three years later via Get Low Recordz with distribution by Priority Records, and reissued in 2000 via Get Low Records with distribution by ILG/Bayside Ent. Distribution and on July 20, 2006, via SMC Recordings with distribution by Fontana Distribution.

== Track listing ==
1. "Intro" - 1:51
2. "The Bigga Figga" - 3:18
3. "Victim of the Vapes" featuring D-Moe - 4:15
4. "Appetizer" - 3:29
5. "The Hard Way" - 4:29
6. "Don't Stop 'til We Major" - 4:37
7. "The SFC" featuring RBL Posse, Gigolo G, San Quinn, Seff Tha Gaffla & D-Moe - 8:43
8. "9 to 5" - 4:04
9. "Mind Yo Own" - 4:13
10. "Nuthin' But a Hustla" - 5:14
11. "Get My Money" - 2:01
12. "Me and My Nigga" - 4:38
13. "Shouts Out" - 4:37
14. "Hidden Track" - 0:50
