= Untouchable (Mac Mall album) =

Studio album by Mac Mall
- Released: April 23, 1996
- Recorded: 1995–1996
- Genres: West Coast hip hop; gangsta rap
- Length: 1:02:44
- Label: Relativity
- Producers: Mike Mosley; Khayree; Rick Rock; Ant Banks; Cold 187um; Kevin Gardner; Prodeje; Robert Redwine; Tone Capone

Mac Mall chronology
Illegal Business? (1993)	Untouchable (1996)	Illegal Business? 2000 (1999)

Singles from Untouchable
- 1. "Get Right" Released: 1996; 2. "Lets Get A Telly" Released: 1996

Professional ratings
Review scores
Source	Rating
AllMusic	4/5 stars

Untouchable is the second studio album by American rapper Mac Mall from Vallejo, California. It was released on April 23, 1996 via Relativity Records. Production was handled by Mike Mosley, Khayree, Rick Rock, Ant Banks, Cold 187um, Kevin Gardner, Prodeje, Robert Redwine and Tone Capone. It features guest appearances from Ant Banks, Big Hutch, Do Thangs, Kokane, Ray Luv and Young Lay.

The album peaked at number 35 on the Billboard 200 albums chart and at number 6 on the Top R&B/Hip-Hop Albums chart in the United States. It spawned two singles: "Get Right" and "Let's Get a Telly". Its lead single, "Get Right" with Levitti on backing vocals, made it to number 41 on the Hot Rap Songs chart.

== Track listing ==
No.	Title	Producer(s)	Length
1.	"Intro"	Rick Rock	0:55
2.	"Let's Get a Telly"	Khayree	4:51
3.	"Straight Lace"	Mike Mosley	4:57
4.	"Servin Game"	Tone Capone	4:44
5.	"Young Nigga"	Khayree	4:21
6.	"Dopefiends Lullaby"	Kevin Gardner; Robert Redwine	2:40
7.	"Ghetto Stardom"	Mike Mosley; Rick Rock (co.); Femi Ojetunde (co.)	4:46
8.	"Get Right"	Mike Mosley	4:28
9.	"Playas Wit da Choppas"	Prodeje	3:43
10.	"Get Away"	Mike Mosley	3:49
11.	"Pimp or Die" (featuring Ray Luv & Young Lay)	Ant Banks	4:09
12.	"Untouchable"	Mike Mosley	4:31
13.	"Opening Doors" (featuring Cold 187um & Kokane)	Cold 187um	4:52
14.	"Playa Tip" (featuring Ant Banks)	Ant Banks	3:58
15.	"Crestside" (featuring Do Thangs)	Khayree	5:06
16.	"Outro"	Rick Rock	0:54
Total length:			1:02:44

== Chart history ==
Chart (1996)	Peak position
US Billboard 200	35
US Top R&B/Hip-Hop Albums (Billboard)	6
