= Illegal Business? 2000 =

Studio album by Mac Mall
- Released: March 23, 1999
- Recorded: 1998–1999
- Genre: West Coast hip hop; gangsta rap
- Length: 1:10:46
- Label: Don't Give Up Productions/Young Black Brotha Records
- Producer: Khayree; O.D.S.

Mac Mall chronology
Untouchable (1996)	Illegal Business? 2000 (1999)	Immaculate (2001)

Singles from Illegal Business? 2000
- 1. "Wide Open" Released: 1999

Illegal Business? 2000 is the third studio album by the American rapper Mac Mall, from Vallejo, California. It was released on March 23, 1999, via Young Black Brotha Records' sublabel, Don't Give Up Productions. The album peaked at number 185 on the Billboard 200 albums chart and at number 54 on the Top R&B/Hip-Hop Albums chart in the United States.

== Track listing ==
All music is composed by Khayree Shaheed, except for track 3 composed by JT the Bigga Figga.

No.	Title	Length
1.	"When They Come For Me"	5:47
2.	"Mohave"	4:51
3.	"Don't Move"	4:14
4.	"Rude Boy"	5:14
5.	"Wide Open"	4:17
6.	"Chicken Head/Hot Wings"	7:17
7.	"Keys 2 the City"	4:38
8.	"With Me or Against Me"	5:34
9.	"Pussy Whipped"	4:52
10.	"White on White Violence" (Interlude)	1:07
11.	"Free Reign"	1:37
12.	"People Every Ask You?"	5:39
13.	"Clockwork"	5:29
14.	"The Singer" (Interlude)	1:49
15.	"What's Ya Name?"	3:53
16.	"Mac's Fashion"	4:28
Total length:		1:10:46

== Chart history ==
Chart (1999)	Peak position
US Billboard 200	185
US Top R&B/Hip-Hop Albums (Billboard)	54
US Heatseekers Albums (Billboard)	7
