= Puttin' It on the Map =

Studio album by JT the Bigga Figga
- Released: June 27, 2000
- Recorded: 1999
- Genres: Gangsta rap; hardcore hip hop; West Coast hip hop
- Labels: Get Low; SMC (2006 re-release)
- Producer: JT the Bigga Figga

JT the Bigga Figga chronology
Something Crucial (2000)	Puttin' It on the Map (2000)	Operation Takeover (2000)

Professional ratings
Review scores
Source	Rating
AllMusic	2.5/5 stars
The Encyclopedia of Popular Music	3/5 stars

Puttin' It on the Map is the sixth album by the rapper JT the Bigga Figga. The album was released on June 27, 2000, for Get Low Recordz, and re-released in 2006 for SMC Recordings. It was produced by JT the Bigga Figga. It was the second of his four albums released in the year 2000.

== Track listing ==
1. "The 2 of Us" – 2:37
2. "Young Black Male" – 3:05
3. "Platinume Playaz" – 5:19
4. "Zeniths in the Summertime" – 4:49
5. "Good for Nuthin'" – 4:44
6. "Playa Haterz" – 1:38
7. "History Class" – 1:19
8. "Dank or Dope" – 8:20
9. "GLP 4.5.7" – 1:40
10. "Right on Time" – 4:35
11. "Cream of the Crop" – 4:07
12. "The Bust" – 1:28
13. "Me and My Nigga" – 4:07
14. "No Competition" – 3:58
15. "Freestyle 1" – 3:17
16. "Freestyle 2" – 2:22
