= Terrain Boss =

Studio album by Sean T
- Released: October 25, 2003
- Genre: Hip hop
- Length: 1:25:16
- Label: Get Gone Records
- Producer: Sean T

Sean T chronology
Familiar Ground (2002)	Terrain Boss (2003)	Ain't Playin' (2005)

Terrain Boss is the sixth studio album by American rapper Sean T. It was released October 25, 2003 via Get Gone Records. Production was handled entirely by Sean T himself. It features guest appearances from A-Wax, Baby Trina, Balance, Biaje, Blue Chip, Cise, E-40, Eddie Projex, Elijah Henry, Furious, Ghazi Shami, Keak da Sneak, Mac & A.K., Mississippi, Mistah F.A.B., Mr. Kee, Mr. Sandman, Papoose, Prohoezak, Roddy Bo, Sean Jr., Seam, Simon, Skip, Ten Dolla, Terror, The Game and Young Noble.

== Track listing ==
No.	Title	Length
1.	"We Gangstas" (featuring The Game)	3:40
2.	"Want War" (featuring Young Noble, A-Wax and Eddie Projex)	4:04
3.	"Mo Murder"	4:07
4.	"What Should I?"	3:40
5.	"What Is It" (featuring Ten Dolla, Balance and Seam)	3:19
6.	"Get Ya Hands Up" (featuring Terror)	3:05
7.	"Damn" (featuring E-40, Keak da Sneak and Biaje)	3:41
8.	"Off Top" (featuring Papoose and Mr. Sandman)	3:59
9.	"Lemme Hit It"	3:17
10.	"Here 2 There" (featuring Skip and Biaje)	3:42
11.	"Hungry"	3:50
12.	"We Are" (featuring The Game and Blue Chip)	3:34
13.	"Who Want It"	4:04
14.	"In the Streets" (featuring Simon and Cise)	3:52
15.	"Party Wit Us" (featuring Mac & A.K. and Baby Trina)	3:31
16.	"Makin' Me High" (featuring Prohoezak and Mr. Kee)	3:27
17.	"Terrain Talk" (featuring Mr. Sandman, Roddy Bo and Sean Jr.)	3:47
18.	"Toe Up" (featuring Mistah F.A.B.)	3:15
19.	"I Choose You" (featuring Mississippi)	4:13
20.	"Groove" (featuring Ghazi and Furious)	3:52
21.	"Papa" (featuring Elijah Henry)	4:08
Total length:		1:25:16

== Personnel ==
- Sean Miguel "Sean T" Thompson – main artist, producer, mixing (tracks: 1, 4, 19), executive producer
- Ghazi Shami – mixing (tracks: 2, 3, 5, 7, 9–13, 15, 17, 20, 21)
- "G-Man Stan" Keith – mixing (tracks: 6, 8, 14, 16, 18)
- Craig Johnson – artwork
- Joel Clifton – photography
