= Operation Takeover =

Studio album by JT the Bigga Figga
- Released: 1996
- Recorded: 1996
- Genres: Gangsta rap; hardcore hip hop; West Coast hip hop
- Length: 50:03
- Label: Get Low
- Producer: JT the Bigga Figga

JT the Bigga Figga chronology
Puttin' It on the Map (2000)	Operation Takeover (1996)	Long Beach 2 Fillmoe (2001)

Professional ratings
Review scores
Source	Rating
Allmusic	3/5 stars

Operation Takeover is the seventh album by rapper, JT the Bigga Figga. The album was initially released on a small scale in 1996 for Get Low Recordz and was produced by JT the Bigga Figga. It was re-released commercially on June 27, 2000, making it the third of three albums JT released in 2000.

== Track listing ==
1. "Intro"- 1:50
2. "Extreme Danger"- 5:19
3. "Northern Cali"- 4:07
4. "Mobstyle Menu"- 3:56
5. "Bout 2 Ball"- 4:28
6. "Filthy Surroundings"- 4:48
7. "Cornerstone Pimpin'"- 1:14
8. "On the Daily"- 4:32
9. "Checking Traps"- 6:12
10. "State Penn"- 4:28
11. "Fall of America"- 4:47
12. "Hidden Secrets"- 4:22
