= Mallennium =

Studio album by Mac Mall
- Released: June 22, 1999 (U.S.)
- Genre: Rap
- Label: Sesedout Records

Mac Mall chronology
Illegal Business? 2000 (1999)	Mallennium (1999)	Immaculate (2001)

Professional ratings
Review scores
Source	Rating
Allmusic	link

Mallennium is the 4th studio album by rapper Mac Mall. It was released June 22, 1999.

== Track listing ==
#	Name	Time
1	"Intro to the Mallennium"	1:25
2	"Life at an Altitude"	4:08
3	"Pop My Pee's"	4:10
4	"Mi Vida Loca (My Crazy Life)"	4:10
5	"Sumthin'"	4:01
6	"Art of War"	4:41
7	"The Day the World Ended"	3:58
8	"Mack.A.Frama.Lama"	3:32
9	"Régime Life"	3:30
10	"Better Way"	4:11
11	"R.I.C.O."	4:35
12	"You Don't Want No Funk"	3:56
13	"Girlfriend"	3:33
14	"Always Down for Me"	4:02
15	"Real Friends"	3:54
16	"My Heart Was a Ghetto"	2:39
17	"I Don't Mind"	3:29
18	"Dope Game"	4:19
19	"One More From Khayree"	1:41
