= Ain't Playin' =

Studio album by Sean T
- Released: October 4, 2005
- Genre: West Coast Hip Hop, Gangsta Rap
- Label: Get Gone Records
- Producer: Sean T, Ghazi Shami

Sean T chronology
Terrain Boss (2003)	Ain't Playin' (2005)

Ain't Playin' is the seventh album by Sean T. It was released on October 4, 2005, for Get Gone Records and was produced by Sean T and Ghazi Shami.

== Track listing ==
1. "Intro" – 1:21
2. "Punchlines" – 3:11
3. "We Don't Stop" – 3:43 (featuring Keak da Sneak)
4. "Gimme That" – 3:06
5. "Cocky" – 3:45 (featuring Messy Marv)
6. "Scream at Me" – 3:58
7. "Thas the Spirit" – 2:57
8. "In Yo Look" – 3:44
9. "All We Do" – 3:33
10. "Jus Don't Get It" – 2:39
11. "Ain't Playin'" – 4:15
12. "Rowdy" – 3:49
13. "We Beastin'" – 3:29 (featuring Turf Talk, Mr. Sandman)
14. "Transformin" – 3:37
15. "Down Ass B" – 4:17 (featuring Blue Chip, PSD)
16. "Long Time Comin'" – 3:53 (featuring San Quinn)
