= Rich Rocka =

Rich Rocka (Album)

Studio album by Ya Boy
- Released: November 5, 2013
- Recorded: 2013
- Genre: West Coast hip hop
- Length: 55:09
- Label: Black Card Music; EMPIRE
- Producer: Arictech Lord; Blackcard R; Hidden Faces; Laine Hitz; Lil Bit & B-Rae; J-Hill; Mitch Arizona; Nizzy J

Ya Boy chronology
Rookie of the Year (2005)	Rich Rocka (Album) (2013)

Rich Rocka is the second studio album from San Francisco rapper Ya Boy. It was released on November 5, 2013. Guests include Trae Tha Truth, Clyde Carson, Sam Hook, Kool Money, Short Dawg, and others.

== Track listing ==
No.	Title	Producer(s)	Length
1.	"MayDay" (featuring Trae Tha Truth)	Laine Hitz	3:09
2.	"New Guy"	J-Hill	5:13
3.	"Been Rich" (featuring El Niño Term)	Arictech Lord	5:19
4.	"Rain On Me"	Hidden Faces	4:43
5.	"550" (featuring El Niño Term & Kool Money)	Blackcard R	3:31
6.	"Bang Bang"	Mitch Arizona	5:06
7.	"100" (featuring T.G.I.F.)	J-Hill	4:08
8.	"Is It You?" (featuring Sam Hook)	Laine Hitz	3:07
9.	"Keep The Party Goin'" (featuring Cik Money)	Blackcard R	4:48
10.	"Hangover" (featuring Kool Money)	Mitch Arizona	3:19
11.	"Maker Her Money" (featuring Lil AL B Sure)	Hidden Faces	5:11
12.	"4 The Money" (featuring Clyde Carson)	Nizzy J	3:30
13.	"Gotta Know" (featuring El Niño Term)	Lil Bit & B-Rae	3:50
14.	"Star"	Mitch Arizona
Total length:			55:09
