= Can I Shine? =

Studio album by Sean T
- Released: October 9, 2001
- Studio: Dungeon Studios
- Genre: Gangsta rap
- Length: 1:11:22
- Label: Asphalt Music Group
- Producer: Sean T; Prohoezak

Sean T chronology
Heated (2000)	Can I Shine? (2001)	Familiar Ground (2002)

Can I Shine? is the fourth solo studio album by American rapper Sean T. It was released on October 9, 2001, via Asphalt Music Group. Recording sessions took place at Dungeon Studios. Production was handled by Sean T himself, except for the song "Gangsta", which was produced by Prohoezak. It features guest appearance from Murder One Gangster, Carmen Santiago, JT the Bigga Figga, Mississippi, Prohoezak, Biaje, B-Legit, Crime Boss, Daz Dillinger, Gonzoe, Guce, Justus, Mac & A.K., Mr. Droop, Outlawz, Re-Akt, Resse Cup, San Quinn and Spice 1.

== Track listing ==
No.	Title	Length
1.	"Beyond My Means" (featuring Papoose and Mississippi)	3:24
2.	"Loosing My Mind" (featuring Carmen Santiago and M.O.G.)	3:34
3.	"Can I Shine?" (featuring M.O.G.)	3:57
4.	"Held Up" (featuring JT the Bigga Figga, San Quinn and Mr. Droop)	4:04
5.	"Snitches" (featuring Daz Dillinger and JT the Bigga Figga)	3:04
6.	"Gettin Paper" (featuring M.O.G.)	3:33
7.	"All Night"	3:47
8.	"Can't Wait Til I Get It" (featuring Carmen Santiago)	3:49
9.	"When I C U" (featuring B-Legit)	4:17
10.	"Bruised Fruit" (featuring Mississippi and M.O.G.)	3:29
11.	"Flip Shit" (featuring M.O.G.)	4:07
12.	"What U Wanna Do?" (featuring Carmen Santiago)	3:09
13.	"Ride or Die" (featuring Outlawz and M.O.G.)	3:04
14.	"That Nigga" (featuring Prohoezak)	3:51
15.	"In Yo Look" (featuring Spice 1 and Crime Boss)	3:52
16.	"Gangsta" (featuring Resse Cup, Prohoezak, Papoose, Mac & A.K.)	4:32
17.	"Definitions" (featuring Guce, Biaje, Re-Akt and Papoose)	4:11
18.	"U Know" (featuring Gonzoe)	3:27
19.	"Get Gone" (featuring Justus)	4:11
Total length:		1:11:22

== Personnel ==
- Sean Miguel "Sean T" Thompson – producer (tracks: 1–15, 17–19), mixing
- Simon "Prohoezak" McKinley – producer (track 16)
- Denoise – mastering
- Clyde Anthony Polk – executive producer
- Arthur Griffith – executive producer
- Dave Ledford – photography
- Yola Fx – artwork
