= JT the Bigga Figga =

American rapper (born 1973)

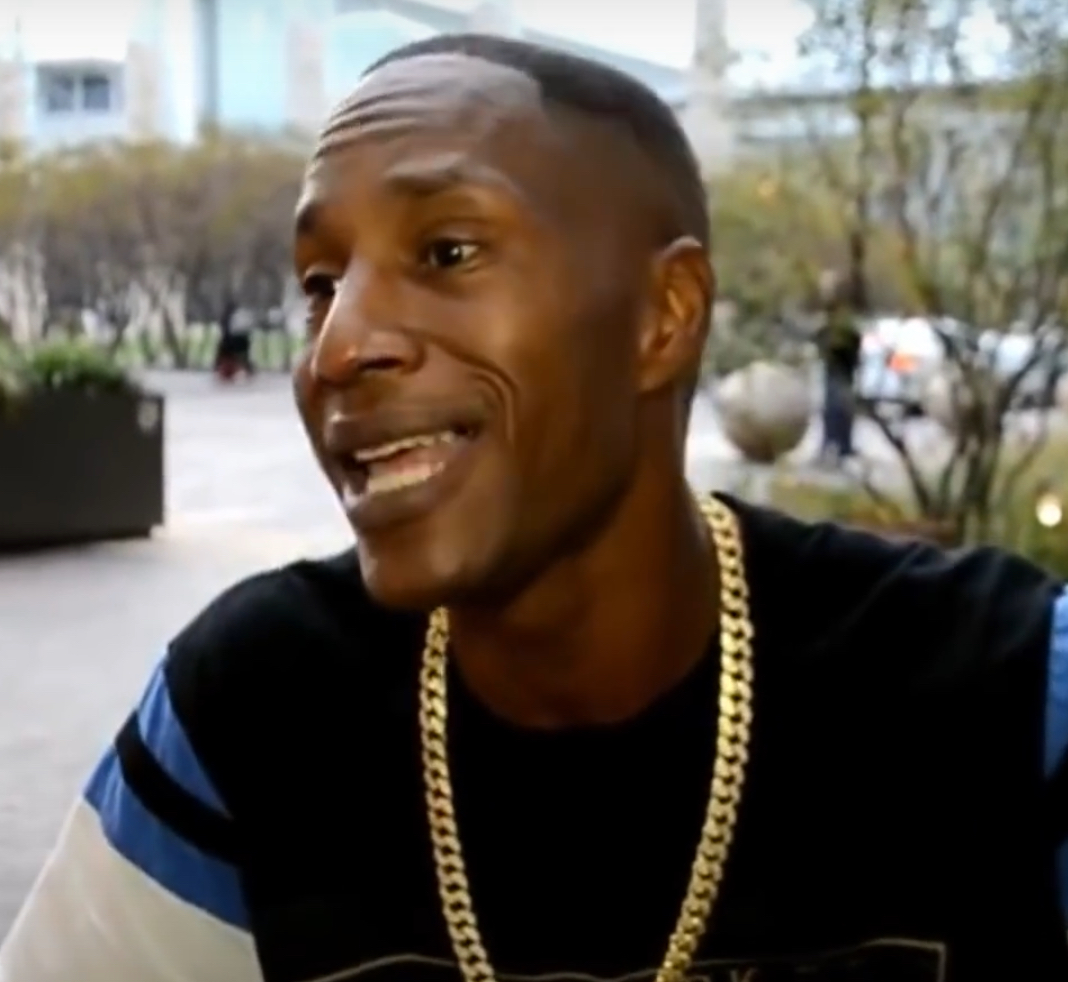
- Thompson in 2018

Background information
- Also known as: Figg Panamera
- Born: Joseph David Thompson; November 8, 1973 (age 52); Fillmore District, San Francisco, California, U.S.
- Genre: West Coast hip-hop
- Occupations: Rapper; songwriter; record producer; record executive
- Years active: 1992–present
- Label: Get Low

Joseph David Thompson (born November 8, 1973), better known by his stage name JT the Bigga Figga (also known as Figg Panamera), is an American rapper, record producer, and record executive from San Francisco, California. He founded the record label Get Low Recordz in 1991, which signed fellow California-based rapper the Game in the early 2000s, prior to his mainstream breakthrough. The label has also signed Messy Marv and San Quinn.

== Music career ==
In 1991, Thompson founded the independent record label Get Low Recordz. The label started as a basement operation.

Thompson's rap debut came in 1992 with the self-released album Don't Stop til We Major, at the age of 18. In the following year, he followed it up with Playaz N the Game. The album's first single, "Game Recognize Game" received significant airplay, thrusting Thompson into the spotlight. The success of his album led to a bidding war among record labels, and he signed with Priority Records in 1994. Subsequent albums released through Priority Records were unsuccessful, however. In 1996, the label elected to release Thompson from his contract. Thompson guest performed on No Limit Records's May 1997 soundtrack album, I'm Bout It, appearing on the song "Game Tight" with The Fast One. Both Thompson and The Fast One produced the song.

After the dissolution of his contract with Priority Records, Thompson went back to self-distributing his albums through Get Low Recordz. With the earnings from his deal with Priority, Thompson invested in a recording studio and began producing beats for other artists. In 2000, after signing a modest distribution deal with Bayside Records, Get Low began expanding productions.

In 2002, Thompson published an E-Book, The CEO Manual.

Thompson is credited with discovering fellow California rapper The Game, with Get Low having released his first album, Untold Story, before his signing with Dr. Dre's Aftermath Entertainment.

In fall of 2005, Thompson was named A&R of West Coast operations for the Houston, Texas-based Rap-A-Lot Records.

Thompson's film credits include the Spike Lee film Sucker Free City (2004), and SKUZZ TV (2007), a documentary DVD released by 3MZ Productions.

In 2006, Thompson worked with Snoop Dogg on the documentary DVD Mandatory Business, which featured Russell Simmons, Spike Lee, Xzibit, Young Buck and 50 Cent.

In 2015, Thompson founded the on-demand service Trapflix, which showcases urban films, documentaries, and concert footage. Thompson has since renewed focus onto filmmaking, as well as discussions of Pan-Africanism in Burkina Faso on his YouTube channel, Trapflix TV.

== Discography ==
Solo albums

- 1992: Don't Stop til We Major
- 1993: Playaz N the Game
- 1995: Dwellin' in tha Labb
- 1996: Operation Takeover
- 1997: Game Tight
- 1999: Something Crucial
- 2000: Puttin' It on the Map
- 2002: Hustle Relentless
- 2003: Project Poetry
- 2005: Neighborhood Supastarz
- 2005: Who Grind Like Us?
- 2006: Name in Your Mouth
- 2006: Drop Your Thangs, Just Box
- 2007: Mr. Vice President
- 2008: Mandatory Business (Block Edition)
- 2008: Blueprintz
- 2010: Gang Injunction 2.0 (Digital Only)
- 2024: Fillmoe Forever (Digital Only)

Collaboration albums

- 2000: Beware of Those (with Mac Mall)
- 2001: Beware of Those Vol. 2 (with Mac Mall)
- 2001: Cali Thuggin (with Speedy Loc)
- 2001: Bay Area Bosses (Compilation album)
- 2001: Long Beach 2 Fillmoe (with Daz Dillinger)
- 2001: Game for Sale (with Daz Dillinger)
- 2002: Aint No Punkz (with Dem Frisco Boyz)
- 2002: Street Warz (with Young Noble)
- 2002: Know About It (with Tha Gamblaz)
- 2002: Gotta Get It (with Juvenile)
- 2003: Game Tight Vol. 2 (with C-Bo, Killa Tay, Daz Dillinger, Sean T, Master P, Steady Mobbin, Mac Mall, Marvaless, Pizzo, Gamblaz, Biaje, San Quinn, Guce, Messy Marv, Seff Tha Gaffla, Mac Dre, Coolio Da Unda Dogg, Cozmo, and Luni Coleone)
- 2004: Illegal Game (with Mac Mall)
- 2004: Present Fillmoe 2 San Jo (with Assassin)
- 2005: Turf Grinders (with Wali M)
- 2006: Hood Luv (with Black Sox)
- 2007: Boss' Life 2 (with Snoop Dogg)
- 2008: Mobb Tales (with Young Noble)
- 2009: Gang Injunction EP (with Young Buck)

Mixtapes

- 2011: Drug Dealer Potential (with Kevin Gates)
- 2012: Conflict of Interest
- 2012: Fillmoelanta 2
- 2012: Kill The Burglar
- 2013: Bonkers
- 2013: Don't Stop Til We Major
- 2013: My Runner
- 2013: Run Ya Bandz Up (with Future & Young Scooter)
- 2014: The Independent Game
- 2014: The Independent Game 2
- 2015: Filmoelanta 3 (with Gucci Mane & Kevin Gates)
- 2015: God's Plan
- 2016: Trap Flix World (with DJ Tokars)
- 2017: Cali Boy Down South

=== Guest appearances ===
Year	Song	Artist(s)	Album
1994	"Playaz and Hustlaz" (featuring JT the Bigga Figga, San Quinn & Master P)	Lil Ric	Deep n tha Game
1994	"Bad Boys" (featuring JT the Bigga Figga)	Dru Down	Explicit Game
1994	"I Got Cha Back" (featuring JT the Bigga Figga & Fly)	Rappin' 4-Tay	Don't Fight the Feelin'
1996	"A Poor Man's Dream" (featuring JT the Bigga Figga & San Quinn)	Messy Marv	Messy Situationz
1996	"Gumbo" (featuring JT The Bigga Figga, Dangerous Dame & Coolio Da Unda Dogg)	Mac Dre	The Rompilation
1996	"Hitz I'm Makin" (featuring JT the Bigga Figga)	San Quinn	The Hustle Continues
1996	"The Hustle Continues" (featuring JT the Bigga Figga)	San Quinn	The Hustle Continues
1996	"Shock the Party" (featuring JT the Bigga Figga)	San Quinn	The Hustle Continues
1996	"Mob Style Musik" (featuring JT the Bigga Figga)	San Quinn	The Hustle Continues
1997	"4 tha Bizzness" (featuring JT the Bigga Figga)	Lunasicc	Mr. Lunasicc
1997	"Trying to Get Mine" (featuring Master P & JT the Bigga Figga)	Steady Mobb'n	Pre-Meditated Drama
1997	"Scrilla, Scratch, Paper" (featuring JT the Bigga Figga & Cougnut)	Luniz	Bootlegs & G-Sides
1998	"Can We All Ball" (featuring Killa Tay & JT the Bigga Figga)	C-Bo	Til My Casket Drops
1998	"Professional Ballers" (featuring Marvaless, Pizzo, Mac Mall, JT the Bigga Figga & Killa Tay)	C-Bo	Til My Casket Drops
1998	"JT's Intro" (featuring JT The Bigga Figga)	Mac Dre	Stupid Doo Doo Dumb
1998	"Black N Brown" (featuring JT the Bigga Figga & Louie Loc)	Mac Dre	17 Reasons
1998	"Northside Soldier" (featuring Mousie & JT the Bigga Figga)	Mac Dre	17 Reasons
1998	"Still Representing" (featuring JT the Bigga Figga)	Lil Ric	It's Like Armegeddon
1999	"From da Filty 2 da Shady" (featuring Da Commissiona, Fleetwood, JT the Bigga Figga & Seff tha Gaffla)	Messy Marv	Death on a Bitch
1999	"Ride Tonight" (featuring JT the Bigga Figga)	Agerman	$uccess The Best Revenge
2000	"Save the Drama" (featuring JT the Bigga Figga & San Quinn)	Sean T	Heated, Held Up (soundtrack) and Can I Shine?
2000	"Nothin' over My G's" (featuring JT the Bigga Figga & Killa Tay)	C-Bo	Enemy of the State
2000	"Strap Ya Boots" (featuring JT the Bigga Figga, Saves Osos & Young Lee)	Tha Gamblaz	Tha Gamblaz
2000	"Federal S**t" (featuring JT the Bigga Figga, Killa Tay & San Quinn)	Tha Gamblaz	Tha Gamblaz
2000	"4 Da Luv" (featuring JT the Bigga Figga)	Tha Gamblaz	Tha Gamblaz
2001	"Fuck The Ice" (featuring JT the Bigga Figga)	Yukmouth & Tha Gamblaz	Block Shit
2001	"End of Days" (featuring JT the Bigga Figga & RBX)	Sleep Dank	Murder Book Author
2001	"Held Up" (featuring JT the Bigga Figga & San Quinn)	Sean T	Can I Shine?
2001	"Ghetto Ballin" (featuring JT the Bigga Figga, Daz Dillinger, Low & Konvict)	Speedy Loc	Cali Thuggin
2002	"Get Low Outlawz" (featuring D-Moe, Double D, JT the Bigga Figga & Telly Mac)	Young Noble	Noble Justice
2002	"Pimp Tyte" (featuring Kazy D & JT the Bigga Figga)	Big Jut	Screwed Up Fo Life
2002	"Beware of Those" (featuring E-40 & JT the Bigga Figga)	Celly Cel	Song'z U Can't Find
2002	"Turf Politics" (featuring JT the Bigga Figga, Levitti & Daz Dillinger)	Messy Marv	Turf Politics
2002	"Get Yo $" (featuring JT the Bigga Figga)	Daz Dillinger	Who Ride wit Us: Tha Compalation, Vol. 2
2004	"S.O.Z." (featuring Snoop Dogg Production by JT the Bigga Figga)	Soz	The Initiative
2004	"Puttin Up A Fight" (Production by JT the Bigga Figga)	Soz	The Initiative
2004	"Pushin Weight" (featuring Keak Da Sneak Production by JT the Bigga Figga)	Soz	The Initiative
2004	"Creepin in the Hood" (Production by JT the Bigga Figga)	Soz	The Initiative
2004	"Step Up" (featuring San Quinn Production by JT the Bigga Figga)	Soz	The Initiative
2004	"Cuz We Want To" (featuring JT The Bigga Figga)	Messy Marv	Different Slanguages
2004	"Intro" (featuring JT the Bigga Figga)	Game	Untold Story
2004	"Neighborhood Supa Starz" (featuring JT the Bigga Figga)	Game	Untold Story
2004	"When Shit Get Thick" (featuring JT the Bigga Figga & Sean T)	Game	Untold Story
2004	"Compton 2 Fillmore" (featuring JT the Bigga Figga)	Game	Untold Story
2004	"Outro" (featuring JT the Bigga Figga)	Game	Untold Story
2005	"The Streetz of Compton" (featuring JT the Bigga Figga)	Game	West Coast Resurrection
2005	"Blacksox" (featuring JT the Bigga Figga & Bluechip)	Game	West Coast Resurrection
2005	"Krush Groove" (featuring JT the Bigga Figga, Nina B & Get Low Playaz)	Game	West Coast Resurrection
2005	"Rookie Card" (featuring JT the Bigga Figga)	Game	West Coast Resurrection
2005	"Work Hard" (featuring JT the Bigga Figga, Bluechip, Nina B & Get Low Playaz)	Game	West Coast Resurrection
2005	"Fuck Wit Me" (featuring JT the Bigga Figga)	Game	Untold Story, Vol. 2
2005	"Money Over Bitches" (featuring JT the Bigga Figga)	Game	Untold Story, Vol. 2
2005	"Eat Ya Beats Alive" (featuring JT the Bigga Figga)	Game	Untold Story, Vol. 2
2005	"Truth Rap" (featuring JT the Bigga Figga)	Game	Untold Story, Vol. 2
2005	"Drop Ya Thangs" (featuring JT the Bigga Figga)	Game	Untold Story, Vol. 2
2005	"The Game Get Live" (featuring JT the Bigga Figga)	Game	Untold Story, Vol. 2
2005	"Thug Hatin'" (featuring JT The Bigga Figga, Killa Tay & Rappin' 4-Tay)	Guce	Pill Music: The Rico Act, Vol. 1
2006	"Never Personal" (featuring JT the Bigga Figga)	Game	G.A.M.E.
2006	"Get Live" (featuring JT the Bigga Figga)	Game	G.A.M.E.
2006	"Way Beyond BAYsik" (featuring JT The Bigga Figga, Tre$Paper & Mike Mar)	Nump	The NUMP Yard
2007	"Dangerous Minds" (featuring Juvenile, JT the Bigga Figga & Skip)	Young Buck	They Don't Bother Me
2008	"Black Wall Street/Antonio Montana" (featuring JT the Bigga Figga & Ray Luv)	Mac Mall	Black Wall Street
2008	"What We Do" (featuring JT the Bigga Figga)	Mac Mall	Black Wall Street
2008	"We Get Gutta" (featuring JT the Bigga Figga, Telly Mac & Ya Boy)	Mac Mall	Black Wall Street
2008	"Talk About It" (featuring Mistah F.A.B. & JT the Bigga Figga)	Mac Mall	Black Wall Street
2008	"Why U Still Muggin'" (featuring JT the Bigga Figga)	Mac Mall	Black Wall Street
2008	"Lock S**t Down" (featuring JT the Bigga Figga & Playa P)	Mac Mall	Black Wall Street
2008	"What It Iz" (featuring JT the Bigga Figga & Keak da Sneak)	Mac Mall	Black Wall Street
2008	"Keep Ya Head Up" (featuring JT the Bigga Figga & Ray Luv)	Mac Mall	Black Wall Street
2008	"Interlude" (featuring jT the Bigga Figga)	Mac Mall	Black Wall Street
2008	"Party People" (featuring JT the Bigga Figga & Ray Luv)	Mac Mall	Black Wall Street
2009	"Dem Boyz" (featuring JT the Bigga Figga, Mr. Skrillz & Mr. Skruge)	Messy Marv	Slangin' at the Cornerstore
2009	"Work That Thang" (featuring G-Bundle, JT the Bigga Figga & Mr. Skrillz)	Messy Marv	Slangin' at the Cornerstore
2009	"Code of the Streets" (featuring The Jacka, Husalah, Mr. Skrillz, JT the Bigga Figga, Gaf Pak, Kard 2 Trust, Scavenger Click & Reek Daddy)	Messy Marv	Slangin' at the Cornerstore
2009	"Ghetto Wishes" (featuring JT the Bigga Figga)	Messy Marv	Northern Cali
2009	"Money Talk" (featuring JT the Bigga Figga)	Messy Marv	Northern Cali
2009	"Frisco Legends" (featuring Black C, JT the Bigga Figga, Cellski, Big Mack & Main-O)	Taydatay	Out of Sight on the Grind
2009	"Still Strugglin'" (featuring JT the Bigga Figga)	Seff tha Gaffla	Lethal Weapon
2010	"Yo Town" (featuring JT the Bigga Figga)	E. Broussard	Single
2012	"Wit the S***" (featuring JT the Bigga Figga & Cellski)	E-40	The Block Brochure: Welcome to the Soil 2
2014	"Pocket Watching" (featuring Figg Panamera)	Migos	Single
