= Straight from the Streets =

Studio album by Sean T
- Released: November 30, 1993
- Recorded: 1993
- Genre: Gangsta Rap, West Coast Hip Hop
- Label: Murder One Records
- Producer: Sean T, G-Man Stan

Sean T chronology
Straight from the Streets (1993)	Pimp Lyrics & Dollar Signs (1996)

Straight from the Streets is the debut album by Sean T. It was released in 1993 for Murder One Records and was produced by Sean T and G-Man Stan. The album was later re-released on November 14, 2003.

== Track listing ==
1. "Keep Em' Broke" – 4:10
2. "Get Gone" – 4:14
3. "Gangsta Shit" – 4:26
4. "As A Youngsta" – 5:09
5. "All In A Niggas Look" – 5:03
6. "Upper Hand" – 4:39
7. "Victim of a Jack" – 4:18
8. "Stay Off the Dick" – 3:41
9. "Straight from the Streets" – 4:33
10. "Murder One Gangsta" – 4:49
11. "Can't Be Touched" – 4:03
12. "A Whole Nutha Level" – 3:56
13. "Only the Strong Survive" – 4:31
14. "Shouts Out" – 4:05
