= Heated (Sean T album) =

Studio album by Sean T
- Released: September 19, 2000
- Genre: Gangsta Rap, West Coast Hip Hop
- Label: Get Gone Records
- Producer: Sean T

Sean T chronology
Pimp Lyrics & Dollar Signs (1996)	Heated (2000)	Can I Shine? (2001)

Professional ratings
Review scores
Source	Rating
Allmusic	2/5 stars

Heated is the third album by Sean T. It was released on September 19, 2000, for his own label Get Gone Records and was entirely produced by Sean T.

== Track listing ==
1. "Intro" - :56
2. "Hataz" - 4:11 (Featuring San Quinn, Re-Act)
3. "In Yo Look" - 3:57 (Featuring Spice 1, Crime Boss)
4. "Cameras" - 2:30
5. "Heated" - 3:32
6. "Real Mcee's" - 3:54
7. "In the Hood" - 4:19 (Featuring Papoose)
8. "We Don't Listen" - 3:53 (Featuring Tuff)
9. "Gangsta" - 3:26
10. "Sean Gotti" - 3:31
11. "All Night" - 3:57
12. "Out" - 3:53
13. "We Ride" - 3:32
14. "Get Gone 2K" - 4:23
15. "Bomb 1st" - 3:33
16. "When I C U" - 4:30 (Featuring B-Legit)
17. "What U Wanna" - 3:09
18. "Livin'" - 3:58
19. "Save the Drama" - 4:07 (Featuring JT the Bigga Figga, San Quinn)
