= Familiar Ground =

Studio album by Sean T
- Released: April 16, 2002
- Genre: Gangsta Rap, West Coast Hip Hop
- Label: Perrion Records
- Producer: Sean T

Sean T chronology
| Can I Shine? (2001) | Familiar Ground (2002) | Terrain Boss (2003) |

Familiar Ground is the fifth album by Sean T. It was released on April 16, 2002 for Perrion Records and was produced entirely by Sean T.

== Track listing ==
1. "Bomb First" - 3:34
2. "Earn Your Strips" - 4:13
3. "Mercenaries" - 3:46 (featuring Spice 1)
4. "Bounce to This" - 3:30
5. "Dirty Game" - 3:54 (featuring Taydatay)
6. "Chopping Game" - 2:29
7. "Tricks" - 3:13 (featuring Bloody Mary)
8. "Gangstas Ride Deep" - 4:07
9. "Married to Tha Game" - 4:20
10. "Mo Murder Mo Drama" - 4:33 (featuring E-40)
11. "Skit" - 4:10
12. "Halla at Me" - 4:22
13. "Ballers Party" - 4:27
14. "Out to Get It" - 4:04
15. "Balia" - 3:10
