= Pimp Lyrics & Dollar Signs =

Studio album by Sean T
- Released: November 5, 1996
- Genre: Gangsta rap
- Length: 1:06:04
- Label: Young Gotti Records
- Producer: Sean T; G-Man Stan; Shannon Lacy

Sean T chronology
Straight from the Streets (1993)	Pimp Lyrics & Dollar Signs (1996)	Heated (2000)

Pimp Lyrics & Dollar Signs is the second studio album by American rapper Sean T. It was released on November 5, 1996, via Young Gotti Records. Production was handled by Sean T himself and G-Man Stan, who also served as executive producer together with Robert "RJ" Johnson. It features guest appearances from Baby Lee, Mac & A.K., Prime Suspect, Scoot Dogg, Sam Joseph, Shannon Lacy, Stacy Hogg, Theresa Shorter and Wicked.

== Track listing ==
No.	Title	Writer(s)	Producer(s)	Length
1.	"Intro"			0:36
2.	"Pimp Lyrics & Dollar Signs" (featuring Scoot Dogg)	Sean Thompson; Daniel Smith	G-Man Stan	4:24
3.	"Hit Da Corner"	Thompson; Stan Keith	Sean T	4:05
4.	"All It Takes"	Thompson	Sean T	3:34
5.	"Somethin 2 Ride 2" (featuring Baby Lee)	Thompson	Sean T	4:32
6.	"All in a Niggas Look" (featuring Prime Suspect)	Thompson; D. McCann; E. Warren; J. Scott; Keith	Sean T; G-Man Stan	4:26
7.	"Lyrical Trip"	Thompson	Sean T	3:20
8.	"Another Jack"	Thompson	Sean T	4:29
9.	"Reality"	Thompson	Sean T	3:59
10.	"Ghetto Situations"	Thompson; Keith; Shannon Lacy	G-Man Stan	3:53
11.	"Street Life"	Thompson	Sean T	4:00
12.	"Against the Grain"	Thompson; Keith; Lacy	G-Man Stan; Shannon Lacy	4:17
13.	"If You Only Knew" (featuring Mac & A.K.)	Thompson; Eric Gordon; Keith Gordon; Keith	G-Man Stan	3:56
14.	"If It Ain't Gee"		G-Man Stan	4:08
15.	"Way 2 Much on It"	Thompson; Keith	G-Man Stan	4:36
16.	"Somethin 2 Ride 2 (Radio) / Bonus Track"	Thompson	Sean T	7:50
Total length:				1:06:04

== Personnel ==
- Sean Miguel "Sean T" Thompson – rap vocals, keyboards, drum programming, producer (tracks: 3–9, 11, 16)
- Daniel "Scoot Dogg" Smith – featured artist (track 2)
- Wicked – backing vocals (track 3)
- Shannon Lacy – backing vocals & engineering (track 4), keyboards (tracks: 10, 12), drum programming (track 10), producer (track 12)
- Sam Joseph – backing vocals (tracks: 4, 9)
- Baby Lee – featured artist (track 5), backing vocals (tracks: 5, 16)
- Prime Suspects – featured artists (track 6)
- Stacy Hogg – backing vocals (track 7)
- Theresa Shorter – backing vocals (tracks: 12, 14)
- Eric "Mac Pacino" Gordon – featured artist (track 13)
- Keith "A.K." Gordon – featured artist (track 13)
- "G-Man Stan" Keith – guitar (tracks: 2, 4–7, 10–16), bass (tracks: 6, 11, 13–15), keyboards (tracks: 2, 10, 13–15), drum programming (tracks: 2, 10, 12–15), producer (tracks: 2, 6, 10, 12–15), engineering (tracks: 2, 3, 5–16), mixing (track 4), executive producer
- Ken Lee – mastering
- Robert "RJ" Johnson – executive producer
- Pat Johnson – photography
- Phunky Phat Graph-X – design, layout
