= Gang Injunction =

EP by Young Buck and JT the Bigga Figga
- Released: December 14, 2009
- Recorded: 2007–2009
- Genre: Hip-hop
- Label: Mandatory Digital
- Producer: JT the Bigga Figga

Singles from Gang Injunction
- 1. "Gang Injunction" Released: December 3, 2009

Gang Injunction is a collaboration EP by rappers Young Buck and JT the Bigga Figga. The EP was released December 14, 2009, through the independent label Mandatory Digital. It sold 6,700 copies its first week of release and debuted on the Billboard 200 at number 106. All tracks on the EP were produced by JT the Bigga Figga.

Gang Injunction was the first single released by Buck and JT to promote the upcoming EP; however, it did not make the cut when released in December 2009.

== Track listing ==
All lyrics by Young Buck and JT the Bigga Figga; music compositions listed below.

| No. | Title | Producer(s) | Length |
|---|---|---|---|
| 1. | "Could'a Been You" | JT the Bigga Figga | 4:13 |
| 2. | "Half My Jewlery" | JT the Bigga Figga | 4:12 |
| 3. | "No License" | JT the Bigga Figga | 4:29 |
| 4. | "We All In" | JT the Bigga Figga | 4:22 |
| 5. | "Make It Look Easy" | JT the Bigga Figga | 3:43 |
| 6. | "Boss Position" | JT the Bigga Figga | 2:52 |
| 7. | "Take It Back" | JT the Bigga Figga | 3:37 |
