= New Jersey Drive, Vol. 2 =

Soundtrack album by Various artists
- Released: April 11, 1995
- Recorded: 1994–1995
- Genre: Hip hop
- Length: 34:28
- Label: Tommy Boy
- Producer: Nick Gomez (exec.); Monica Lynch (exec.); Al Mal; DJ Premier; Evil Dee; Funkmaster Flex; Knobody; KRS-One; Marley Marl; Mr. Walt; Naughty by Nature; Organized Konfusion; Roc Raida

New Jersey Drive soundtrack chronology
New Jersey Drive, Vol. 1 (1995)	New Jersey Drive, Vol. 2 (1995)

Professional ratings
Review scores
Source	Rating
AllMusic	3/5 stars

New Jersey Drive, Vol. 2 (Original Motion Picture Soundtrack) is the second of two soundtracks to Nick Gomez' 1995 film New Jersey Drive. It was released on April 11, 1995 through Tommy Boy Records, and consists of hip hop music. Composed of eight songs, the album features performances by Biz Markie, Boot Camp Clik, E Bros, Flip Squad All-Stars, Jeru the Damaja, Mad Lion, Naughty by Nature, O.C. and Organized Konfusion. Production was handled by Da Beatminerz, DJ Premier, Funkmaster Flex, Knobody, KRS-One, Marley Marl and Roc Raida.

This soundtrack failed to match the success of the gold-selling Volume 1, but it still managed to make it to #58 on the Billboard 200 and #9 on the Top R&B/Hip-Hop Albums.

== Track listing ==
No.	Title	Producer(s)	Length
1.	"Funky Piano" (performed by E Bros)	Knobody; Roc Raida	5:14
2.	"Headz Ain't Ready" (performed by Boot Camp Clik)	Evil Dee; Mr. Walt	5:19
3.	"Connections" (performed by Naughty by Nature)	Naughty by Nature; Al Mal	3:11
4.	"Nobody Beats the Biz" (performed by Biz Markie)	Marley Marl	5:05
5.	"Invasion" (performed by Jeru the Damaja)	DJ Premier	3:11
6.	"Own Destiny" (performed by Mad Lion)	KRS-One	4:37
7.	"You Won't Go Far" (performed by O.C. & Organized Konfusion)	Organized Konfusion	3:43
8.	"Flip Squad's in da House" (performed by Flip Squad All-Stars)	Funkmaster Flex	4:08
Total length:			34:28

== Chart history ==
Chart (1995)	Peak position
US Billboard 200	58
US Top R&B/Hip-Hop Albums (Billboard)	9
