= Untold Story, Vol. 2 =

Untold Story: Volume II

Compilation album by The Game
- Released: July 26, 2005
- Recorded: 2002–2004
- Genre: West Coast hip hop; gangsta rap; hardcore hip hop
- Length: 59:24
- Label: FastLife, Get Low
- Producer: JT the Bigga Figga (exec.), Sean T

The Game chronology
| West Coast Resurrection (2005) | Untold Story: Volume II (2005) | G.A.M.E. (2006) |

Professional ratings
Review scores
| Source | Rating |
|---|---|
| RapReviews | link |

Untold Story: Volume II is a compilation album by American hip hop recording artist The Game. It was released independently on July 26, 2005, for Get Low Recordz. The album proved to be another success for The Game despite being released independently, peaking at #61 on the Billboard 200, #29 on the Top R&B/Hip-Hop Albums and #7 on the Independent Albums.

== Track listing ==
| No. | Title | Length |
|---|---|---|
| 1. | "Fuck Wit Me" (featuring JT the Bigga Figga) | 3:23 |
| 2. | "For My Gangstaz" | 4:03 |
| 3. | "Money Over Bitches" (featuring JT the Bigga Figga) | 3:54 |
| 4. | "I'm A Mobsta" (featuring Young Menace) | 3:44 |
| 5. | "Business Never Personal" (featuring Blue Chip) | 2:32 |
| 6. | "Eat Ya Beats Alive" (featuring JT the Bigga Figga) | 3:33 |
| 7. | "Troublesome" | 3:14 |
| 8. | "Just Beginning (Where I'm From)" | 3:09 |
| 9. | "Born and Raised In Compton (Raised As A G)" | 2:39 |
| 10. | "We Are The Hustlaz" (featuring Blue Chip & Sean T) | 3:32 |
| 11. | "Walk Thru The Sky" | 1:45 |
| 12. | "Truth Rap" (featuring JT the Bigga Figga) | 3:50 |
| 13. | "Drop Ya Thangs" (featuring JT the Bigga Figga) | 4:28 |
| 14. | "The Game Get Live" (featuring JT the Bigga Figga) | 3:53 |
