= G.A.M.E. =

Compilation album by the Game
- Released: March 21, 2006
- Recorded: 2002–2003
- Genre: West Coast hip-hop; gangsta rap; hardcore hip-hop
- Length: 41:02
- Label: FastLife
- Producer: Bob Perry (exec.); JT the Bigga Figga (exec.)

The Game chronology
Untold Story, Vol. 2 (2005)	G.A.M.E. (2006)	Doctor's Advocate (2006)

Professional ratings
Review scores
Source	Rating
RapReviews	3/10

G.A.M.E. is a compilation album by American West Coast hip hop recording artist the Game. It was released independently on March 21, 2006, via Fast Life Music. JT the Bigga Figga and Bob Perry served as executive producers. Released without the Game's permission by JT the Bigga Figga causing a lawsuit and the Game encouraging fans not to buy it, but instead download it. The album peaked at #151 on the Billboard 200, #31 on the Top R&B/Hip-Hop Albums and #14 on Independent Albums in the United States.

== Track listing ==
No.	Title	Beats by	Length
1.	"Anything You Ask For" (featuring Bootleg)	Ill Will; DJ B-Roc; Cataclysmic Sounds	3:08
2.	"Never Personal" (featuring JT the Bigga Figga)	DJ B-Roc; Ill Will	3:30
3.	"Gettin' American Money Easy" (featuring Young Noble)	DJ B-Roc	3:12
4.	"Curtains"	J. Cardim	3:30
5.	"Real Niggas Stand Up"	Wizard	3:58
6.	"Walk Wit Me"	MoSS	3:07
7.	"It Gets Thicker"	DJ B-Roc	2:36
8.	"That's Presidents" (featuring Telly Mac)	DJ B-Roc	2:48
9.	"It's the Game"	Ill Will	3:45
10.	"Nothin' Promised" (featuring Bootleg)	Jaguar	4:22
11.	"Get Live" (featuring JT the Bigga Figga)	Cataclysmic Sounds	3:43
12.	"It Is What It Is" (featuring Shoestring)	Ill Will	3:23
Total length:			41:02

== Additional personnel ==
- Ill Will – guitar, A&R
- Arnold Mischkulnig – keyboards, mixing
- Lenaé Harris – cello
- Benjamin "DJ B-Roc" Ruttner – scratches
- Bob Perry – executive producer, design
- Joseph "JT the Bigga Figga" Tom – executive producer
- Ben Altman – design
- Dan Green – A&R

== Charts ==
Chart performance for G.A.M.E.
Chart (2006)	Peak position
US Billboard 200	151
US Top R&B/Hip-Hop Albums (Billboard)	31
US Top Rap Albums (Billboard)	16
US Independent Albums (Billboard)	14
