= Rookie of the Year (album) =

Studio album by Ya Boy
- Released: May 31, 2005
- Genre: Hip hop; hyphy
- Label: SMC; Done Deal Ent.
- Producer: San Quinn (exec.); Ya Boy (exec.); Davey D. Cohn; Droop-E; Cello; Cozmo; J-Moe; Keez; King Cydal; Matter; Rashaad Wiggins; Razor; Rick Rock; Rob Lo; Sean T; Tony Butcha

Ya Boy chronology
Rookie of the Year (2005)	Rich Rocka (2013)

Rookie of the Year is the debut album from San Francisco rapper Ya Boy. It was released on May 31, 2005. Guests include San Quinn, Messy Marv, Roscoe, Clyde Carson, Turf Talk, E-40, Goldie, and others.

== Track listing ==
#	Track	Featured Guest(s)	Producer(s)	Length
01.	"Introduction"		Rob Lo	3:15
02.	"Bust Back"	Bailey	Cozmo	3:53
03.	"We So Cold"	E-40; Turf Talk	Droop-E	3:20
04.	"Right Here'"	Selau	Davey D. Cohn; J-Moe	4:06
05.	"Step Ya' Game Up"		Rick Rock	3:53
06.	"Fly As This"	Clyde Carson	Droop-E	3:27
07.	"Bigger The Drama"	Messy Marv	Matter	3:55
08.	"Bad Company"	Bailey	Sean T	4:04
09.	"Wut's Good"		Tony Butcha	3:41
10.	"On Fire"		King Cydal	3:13
11.	"Turf 2 Tha Club"		King Cydal	2:52
12.	"Get That Weight Off"	San Quinn	Rashaad Wiggins	3:42
13.	"Not For Free"		Droop-E	4:00
14.	"Get Down"	Big Rich	Sean T	3:30
15.	"Somethin' To Rap About"	San Quinn; AP.9	Razor	3:41
16.	"It's Easy"		King Cydal	4:20
17.	"How U Want It"	Joy	Davey D. Cohn; J-Moe	3:28
18.	"Cannon"	Blue Chip	Keez for Goodfella Records	3:24
19.	"Tha Hardest"	Roscoe	Davey D. Cohn	3:56
20.	"Run Yo' Mouth"	Goldie; Boo Banger; R-Geezy; Infamous JD	Cello	4:09
