= Eli Meltzer =

American musician, songwriter and record producer

ELI
- Also known as: Smoov-E
- Born: Eli Meltzer; September 26, 1979 (age 47)
- Origin: Summertown, Tennessee
- Genres: Hip hop, rockabilly
- Occupations: Musician, record producer, songwriter, performer
- Years active: 1992–present
- Labels: I-Khan Distribution, R.E.A.L. Records
- Website: smoov-e.tv

Eli Rafael Meltzer (born September 26, 1979), better known by his stage name Smoov-E, or colloquially "E", is an American musician, songwriter, record producer, and performer. He is from Summertown, Tennessee, but moved to Sebastopol, California, at a young age.

== Biography ==
Meltzer was born in Summertown, Tennessee, on September 26, 1979, to Alan and Lee Meltzer. The youngest of four siblings, Eli, his three sisters, mom, and dad moved to Sebastopol when he was 4 years old.

When he graduated high school, Eli continued to pursue high school girls and after making valuable connections in the local San Francisco Bay Area hip hop scene, he released his self-titled debut under the name Smoov-E. While he has since stated that the album isn't his personal favorite, it did establish him as a presence in the underground scene and featured other prominent artists such as Andre Nickatina, X-Raided, and Young Lay.

He went on to release five more albums in the same fashion over the next several years including Keep Your Hand Out My Pocket (R.E.A.L. Records/2000), Confessions (R.E.A.L. Records/2001), Assuefatto (R.E.A.L. Records/2003), Long Duck Dong (R.E.A.L. Records/2005), and Sum Yung Girl (R.E.A.L. Records/2006). He continued to expand his audience with each consecutive record showing more lyrical prowess, vocal presence, and musical skill than its predecessor. Not only did E develop as an artist he also forged new working relationships with other Bay Area talents during this period including Dubee a.k.a. Sugawolf, Reek Daddy, and most notably the late Mac Dre.

By 2007 Eli had released 6 full-length studio LPs and found his music straying from the synthesizers and drum machines that previously defined his sound. With Larry Dallas (R.E.A.L. Records/2007), Eli moved towards real instrumentation of his sounds playing live drums and piano on much of the album. By the time Rusty Squeezebox (R.E.A.L. Records/2008), was in production Eli had picked up playing the guitar just as both his grandfathers did before him. E's newfound skills with live instruments worked to his advantage while producing the western themed album which meshed the sounds of classic spaghetti western scores and his own unique style of rap.

During the recording of Sum Yung Girl, Eli became increasingly interested in video production. After shooting a video for the song "Dream Girl" he decided to put out his next two albums with accompanying DVDs. These led to his next project, Simply Suggestive (R.E.A.L. Records/2009). The concept behind Simply Suggestive would be to shoot and perform 12 previously released Smoov-E songs live in different settings. Doing so would not only provide him a chance to create more videos but also showcase his ever-growing talent on live instruments ranging from guitar, piano, vintage synthesizers, banjos, turntables, and even a typewriter. A twelve track audio CD version was made available as well.

In 2009 Eli released Mr. Biscuits (R.E.A.L. Records/2009), a compilation of B-sides and new tracks heavily laden with vintage synthesizers and drum machines. The album finally provided E with a chance to work with two of his longtime favorites Too Short and Brotha Lynch Hung. Following Mr. Biscuits came El Joy Del Sexo (R.E.A.L. Records/2010). The Latin themed record combined elements of live instruments and hand percussion with Giorgio Moroder-like synthesizers and drum sequencers.

2011 found Smoov E transitioning into new musical horizons as he signed a two-year record deal with I-Khan Distribution under the name "Eli". The only album that came from these years was titled "One Popular Guy" (I-Khan/2011), executive produced by Andre Nickatina. It took the artists love for early rock and roll and fused it with the rap production he's best known for. The release was backed by heavy touring and self-indulgence.

After his deal with I-Khan, Eli began working on another Smoov E concept album. For the break dance themed record Smoov E enlisted the help of legendary producer Egyptian Lover for the title track. He collaborated with artist Nathan Gomez to create a 32-page, full cover, deluxe companion comic book for the EP "Rappin' Robot" (R.E.A.L. Records 2013) that preceded the full-length record simply entitled "Breakdance" (R.E.A.L. Records).

In 2013 Smoov E set his sights on recording an album produced in the style of the 1980s horror director John Carpenter. On Jessica Gets Jealous (R.E.A.L. Records 2014) the unmistakable sounds and elements from classic slasher films complement the sharp lyrics as Smoov E courts yet another doomed mistress. Released in February 2014 on Rap Entering Another Level.

In 2014 Smoov E releases another two albums. The first is an electro funk themed album aptly titled I Funked Her First. The second release of 2014 is a Top Gun themed album about the world's most famous legal hooker "Air Force Amy". After a liquor fueled performance at Carson City's Bunny Ranch, and a chance meeting with Air Force Amy, the two decided Amy needed a theme song. The result was a five-song EP in the style of Harold Faltermeyer's original score for Top Gun. This album glorifies the world of legal prostitution.

2015 brought the release of the hit single "Swerve", a collaboration with Dirt Nasty (née Simon Rex). The music video was produced by Gary Ottonello.

2017 marked Meltzer's first major production credit with the release of Mickey Avalon's Teardrops On My Tombstone. This release would encourage him to further develop his producer credits.

== Discography ==
=== Albums ===
- Smoov-E (1999)
- Keep Your Hand Out My Pocket (2000)
- Confessions (2001)
- Assuefatto (2003)
- Long Duck Dong (2005)
- Sum Yung Girl (2006)
- Larry Dallas (2007)
- Rusty Squeezebox (2008)
- Simply Suggestive (2009)
- Mr. Biscuits (2010)
- El Joy Del Sexo (2010)
- The King And Mr. Biscuits (with Andre Nickatina) (2010)
- Addicted/Million Dollar Remix Series (Volume 2) (2011)
- One Popular Guy (2012)
- Rappin’ Robot EP (2013)
- Breakdance (Bring Back The Music From The 1980’s) (2013)
- Jessica Gets Jealous EP (2014)
- I Funked Her First (2014)
- Air Force Amy EP (2014)
- Breakfast In Bed (with Dirt Nasty) (2015)

== Producer Discography ==
- Teardrops On My Tombstone (with Mickey Avalon) (2017)
- "End Of My Line" (with Mickey Avalon) (2018)
