= Immaculate (album) =

Studio album by Mac Mall
- Released: February 20, 2001
- Studio: QDIII Sound Lab; YBB Studios
- Genre: West Coast hip hop; gangsta rap
- Length: 1:14:50
- Label: Sesed Out Records
- Producer: DJ Yon; Femi Ojetunde; Khayree; Shock G

Mac Mall chronology
Beware of Those (2000)	Immaculate (2001)	Mackin Speaks Louder Than Words (2002)

Professional ratings
Review scores
Source	Rating
AllMusic	1.5/5 stars
RapReviews	8/10

Immaculate is the fourth solo studio album by American rapper Mac Mall. It was released on February 20, 2001, through Sesed Out Records. Production was handled by Khayree, Femi Ojetunde, DJ Yon and Shock G, with co-producer Thomas Anderson, and Leila Steinberg and Mac Mall serving as executive producers. It features guest appearances from Hussein Fatal, Shock G, DJ Yon, Kim Morgan, Lucia Sykes and D Knowledge.

The album did not enter the Billboard 200, however, it debuted at number 65 on the Top R&B/Hip-Hop Albums and number 22 on the Independent Albums in the United States.

== Track listing ==
No.	Title	Producer(s)	Length
1.	"Mac Jesus"	Khayree	4:32
2.	"Some More of It"	Khayree	5:05
3.	"Save Me" (featuring Hussein Fatal)	Khayree	5:04
4.	"Immaculate" (featuring DJ Yon)	DJ Yon	4:30
5.	"Magnificent"	Femi Ojetunde; Thomas Anderson (co.)	4:53
6.	"War on Drugs"	Khayree	5:33
7.	"Shakin' in the Alley"	Khayree	5:32
8.	"I Feel Your Pain"	Khayree	4:27
9.	"Bossin' Up"	Khayree	4:12
10.	"Chassy" (featuring Shock G, Kim Morgan and Lucia Sykes)	Shock G	4:36
11.	"Cold on Me"	Khayree	4:12
12.	"Seventeen"	Khayree	4:15
13.	"Monster"	Khayree	4:07
14.	"P.O.P"	Femi Ojetunde	4:17
15.	"Higher Than Hubble"	Khayree	4:50
16.	"The Man Upstairs" (featuring D Knowledge)	DJ Yon	4:45
Total length:			1:14:50

== Personnel ==
- Jamal "Mac Mall" Rocker — rap vocals, executive producer
- Bruce "Hussein Fatal" Washington — rap vocals (track 3)
- Gregory "Shock G" Jacobs — rap vocals, producer, recording & mixing (track 10)
- DJ Yon — backing vocals (track 4), scratches (tracks: 1, 4, 6, 12, 13), producer (tracks: 4, 16)
- Kim Morgan — additional vocals (track 10)
- Lucia Sykes — additional vocals (track 10)
- D-Knowledge — voice (track 16)
- T. Roy — bass (track 16)
- Khayree Shaheed — producer, recording & mixing (tracks: 1–3, 6–9, 11–13, 15)
- Femi Ojetunde — producer, recording & mixing (tracks: 5, 14)
- Thomas Anderson — co-producer (track 5)
- Pam Drake — recording (tracks: 4, 16)
- Michael Denten — mixing (tracks: 4, 16)
- Michael Romanowski — mastering
- Leila Steinberg — executive producer
- Brandon C. Rodegeb — art direction, design, layout, A&R
- Daven Michaels — art direction
- Phantom — cover design
- Carl Posey — photography
- Rob Nonies — A&R
- Daraka Shaheed — project consultant

== Charts ==
Chart (2001)	Peak position
US Top R&B/Hip-Hop Albums (Billboard)	65
US Independent Albums (Billboard)	22
