= Mackin Speaks Louder Than Words =

Studio album by Mac Mall
- Released: July 30, 2002
- Genre: Rap
- Label: Sesedout Records

Mac Mall chronology
Immaculate (2001)	Mackin Speaks Louder Than Words (2002)	The Macuscripts, Vol. 1 (2004)

Mackin Speaks Louder Than Words is the 6th studio album by Mac Mall. It was released July 30, 2002.

== Track listing ==
#	Name	Time
1	"Side Show Intro (Da' Town 4AM)"	0:53
2	"N**ga Wake Up" (feat. Big Syke)	4:20
3	"I Keep Hoes Broke"	4:14
4	"Bust Yo Guns"	4:11
5	"All on a Bitch"	4:55
6	"Mac Fashion"	4:15
7	"Power Moves the Family"	4:08
8	"Mack A. Frama Lama"	4:20
9	"5-3-5 (Five-Tre-Five)"	4:01
10	"Picture This"	4:03
11	"Imagine"	5:34
12	"I Mac, Therefore, I Am"	4:42
13	"Smile For Me (Ghetto Girl)"	4:56
14	"Together"	4:33
15	"Life So Far"	5:06
