= Illegal Business? =

Studio album by Mac Mall
- Released: July 13, 1993
- Recorded: 1992–1993
- Genre: West Coast hip-hop; gangsta rap; Mobb music
- Length: 74:45
- Label: Young Black Brotha
- Producer: Khayree

Mac Mall chronology
Illegal Business? (1993)	Untouchable (1996)

Professional ratings
Review scores
Source	Rating
AllMusic	3/5 stars
The Source	(Note: Initially, The Source mistakenly awarded the album 2.5 mics; the score was corrected to 3.5 in the next issue.)

Illegal Business? is Mac Mall's debut album. It was released on July 13, 1993. It was produced by Khayree. A single, "Ghetto Theme," was released, for which Tupac Shakur directed the music video. The album peaked at #71 on the Billboard charts. The album sold more than 125,000 copies. In 2025, Pitchfork placed Illegal Business? at number 72 on their list of the 100 Best Rap Albums of All Time.

== Track listing ==
#	Name	Featured Guest(s)	Time
1	"Crest Side Playah"		2:06
2	"Sic Wit Tis"		4:40
3	"It's All Good"		4:45
4	"I Gots 2 Have It"		4:44
5	"Cold Sweat"		4:55
6	"Nathan But Game"		4:44
7	"Versatile"		4:19
8	"Crack Da 40"		5:10
9	"Da Bank Heist"		4:43
10	"Don't Wanne See Me"		5:06
11	"Young N Da Game"		4:50
12	"$$ on da Dank"		4:37
13	"My Opinion"		4:04
14	"Illegal Business?"		5:39
15	"Ghetto Theme"	Eboni Foster	5:15
16	"Pimp Shit"	Mac Dre, Ray Luv	5:08
