= Ghazi Shami =

American music executive (born 1977)

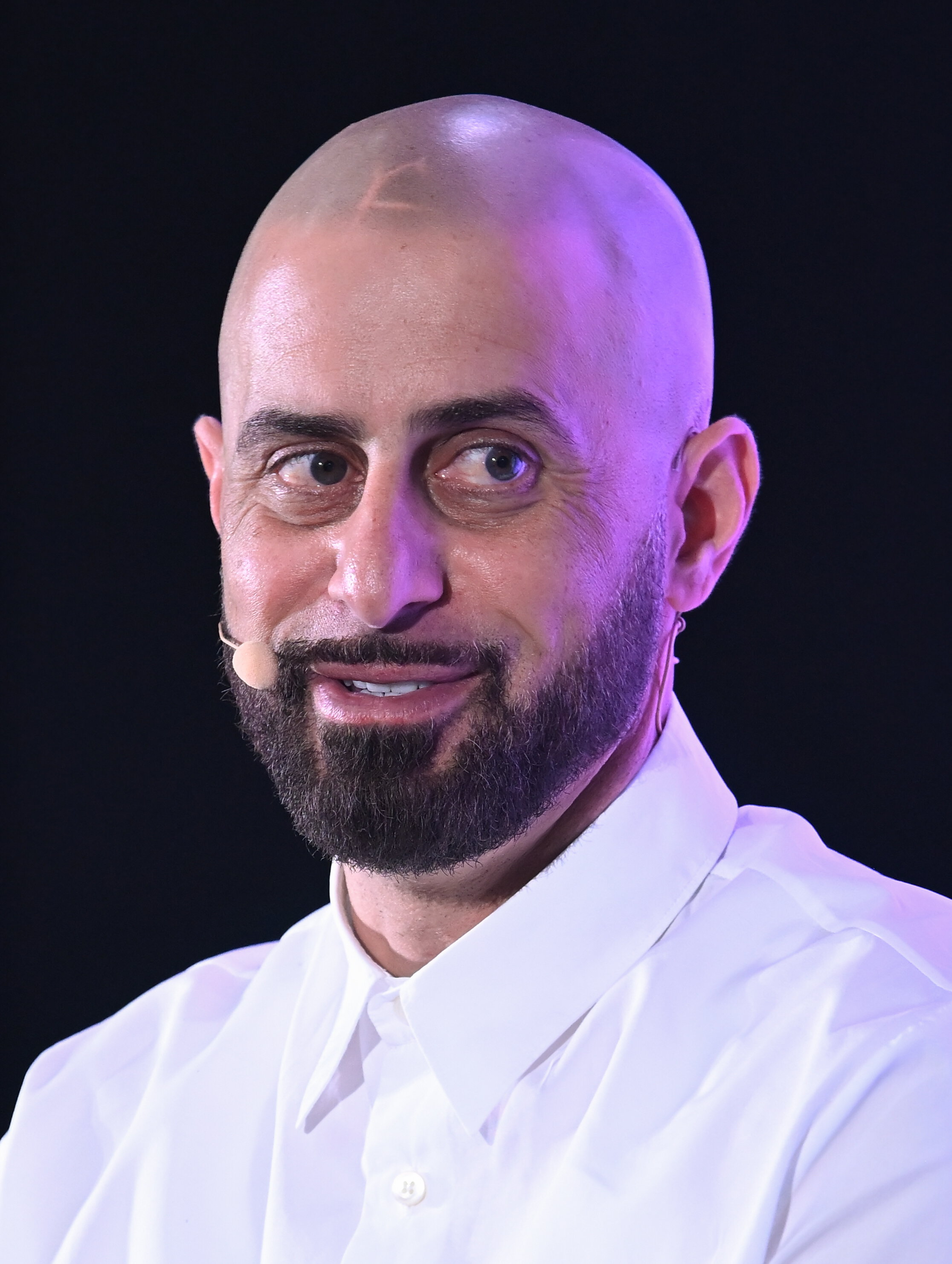
- Shami in 2024
- Born: 1977 (age 48–49); San Francisco, California, U.S.
- Education: College of San Mateo (AA); San Francisco State University (BA)
- Occupations: Music technologist; record producer; audio engineer; entrepreneur
- Known for: CEO and founder of Empire Distribution
- Honours: San Francisco State University Annual Alumni Hall of Fame Celebration (2025)

Ghazi Shami (Arabic: غازي شامي; born 1977), is an American music executive, technologist and entrepreneur, best known as the founder and CEO of Empire Distribution. Of Palestinian origins, Shami has been described as the "highest-profile Palestinian executive in the music business."

In 2010, Shami established Empire Distribution in San Francisco, and has remained its CEO since. As of 2026, Empire had offices in New York, Nashville, the United Kingdom, and the Middle East. The company played a role in the careers of artists in genres such as hip-hop, R&B, Latin, reggae, pop, rock, gospel, and country.

Throughout his career, Shami has received several honors, including being named a "San Franciscan of the Year," being included in Variety's Top 50 Hip-Hop Executives of All Time, and receiving Billboard's Clive Davis Visionary Award.

== Early life ==
Shami was born and raised in San Francisco, California. His father, Fuad Hanna Shami (1934–2008), was from Khirbat Lid in Palestine and left in 1948 following its occupation and depopulation during the Arab-Israeli War. His mother was from Ramla.

From a young age, Shami demonstrated an aptitude for technology and music. By four years old, he was repairing washing machines in his father's laundromat, and by 14, he was creating "pause-tapes" using a Gemini mixer and two tape decks.

== Education ==
Shami graduated from the College of San Mateo with an associate degree in music technology. He earned a bachelor's degree in radio and television from San Francisco State University. Ghazi was later inducted to San Francisco State's Alumni Association Hall of Fame in 2025.

== Career ==
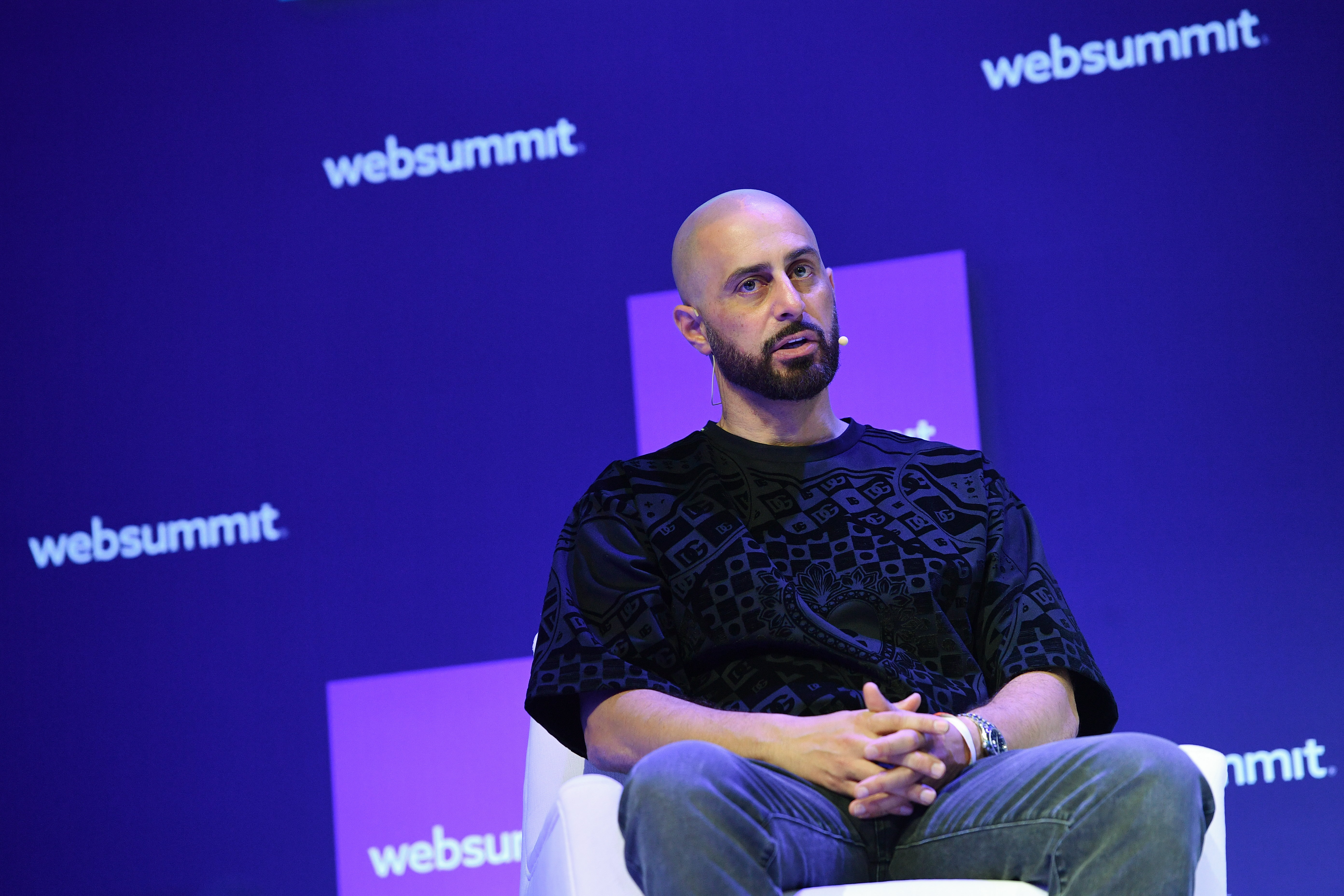
Shami on the PandaConf stage during day three of Web Summit 2022 at the MEO Arena in Lisbon, Portugal.

=== Career before Empire ===
Prior to founding Empire, Shami worked in technology companies during the new millennium's initial tech boom, including Sun Microsystems, Eloquent Technologies, and Audio Highway, where he gained insights into fiber optic cables and nascent compression technology. He also served as an audio engineer for 3rd Eye Studios in 1995 and as a creative media manager for Audiohighway.com in 2000.

Around 2002, he left his corporate job, using the financial payout to fund his music venture. During this period, he was involved in music production, making beats, writing, and recording albums with artists like Messy Marv and Planet Asia, though these projects were not released. He spent time at Hyde Street Studios, mixing projects, printing cover art, and pressing disks, developing a "one-stop-shop" service for artists and brands.

=== Empire: Founding and business model ===
Ghazi Shami founded Empire Distribution in 2010 in San Francisco, California. He started the company with a credit card. Shami's initial vision for Empire was to bridge the gap between a digital distribution platform and a record label, offering a unique business model that championed artist autonomy and transparency. Empire has become an internationally recognized music company with offices in North America, Europe and the Middle East.

Empire focused on non-exclusive deals, believing that fair treatment and transparent royalty statements would encourage artists to stay. Artists could log in to see their earnings. Empire's core business model emphasized a "win more than you lose" approach, operating leaner than major labels and signing a higher volume of acts, often investing "sweat equity" rather than large financial advances. They generally avoid royalty-based deals, structuring most agreements as partnerships that favor the artist with higher percentages.

Shami's music label has produced music for 50 Cent, XXXTentacion, Benny the Butcher, Hayley Kiyoko, Nef the Pharaoh, The Foreign Exchange, Rapper Big Pooh, Keak Da Sneak, Kendrick Lamar, and others. Shami has helped jump-start the careers of Kendrick Lamar, Migos, Cardi B, and Anderson .Paak.

== Reception ==
For his impact in the music industry, Shami has received several honors and awards. In 2020, he was named in Rolling Stone's "Future 25" for his contribution to the success of charting songs by Money Man, Tyga and Migos. In 2023, he was named in Variety's Top 50 Hip-Hop Executives of All Time. In 2025, Shami was named a "San Franciscan of the Year" for his leadership of Empire and his investment in the city's cultural landscape. That same year, he was inducted into the San Francisco State University Alumni Hall of Fame, describing his approach as "bring[ing] a rare blend of creativity, technical knowledge and strategic vision". Also in 2025, Shami received the Clive Davis Visionary Award from Billboard at the inaugural Global Power Players event.
