= Khayree =

- Born: Khayree Shaheed; 1960 (age 65–66); Vallejo, California, U.S.
- Genres: Hip hop; G-funk; West Coast hip hop; gangsta rap
- Occupations: Record producer; bassist
- Years active: 1976–present
- Labels: Strictly Business Productions; Young Black Brotha

Khayree Shaheed is a music producer, from Vallejo, California. He is best known for producing for Bay Area rappers such as Mac Dre, Mac Mall, Ray Luv, and Young Lay.

== Career ==
He produced most of Young Lay's album Black 'N Dangerous and Mac Mall's Illegal Business?, as well as many others. Some of the best known songs he produced include Young Lay's "All About My Fetti", which was used for the soundtrack to the movie New Jersey Drive, and also Mac Mall's "Ghetto Theme", whose music video was directed by Tupac Shakur. His production style is similar to the G-Funk that was commonly found in West Coast Rap in the mid-1990s, but usually without the use of samples. Khayree Produced Ray Luv's album "Forever Hustlin" and the album was released in 1995 by Interscope Records through the Bay Area label Young Black Brotha, was his major label debut it reached #21 on the Billboard Top R&B/Hip Hop Albums chart. Ray Luv's single "Last Nite" was popular among street Gangsta rap fans. Khayree released a solo album in 1997 titled The Blackalation (The World Is Yours). Some of his earliest productions were the tracks "Hooked" and "It's a Party" off of Vanilla Ice's 1990 album To the Extreme.

As of January 2010, he had reconnected with longtime Young Black Brotha Records labelmate Mac Mall, with whom he was in the studio working on new crestside material for a new album which would be off Mall's new label Thizz Or Die.
