= Young Lay =

American rapper

- Born: Lathan Williams; 1975 (age 50–51); Vallejo, California, U.S.
- Genres: West Coast hip hop, Gangsta rap
- Occupation: Rapper
- Years active: 1994–2004

Lathan Williams (born 1975 in Vallejo, California), better known by his stage name Young Lay, is a San Francisco Bay Area-based gangsta rapper.

He has worked with artists such as label mate Ray Luv, Tupac Shakur and Mac Dre.

Young Lay was becoming popular when a 1995 attempt was made on his life when he was shot in the head while stopped at a Vallejo traffic light as a passenger in a friend's car. Although critically injured, Young Lay survived and went on to resume rapping after extensive therapy for brain damage in which he had to learn to speak again.

On May 17, 1996, Young Lay's infant son Le-Zhan Williams was kidnapped when two teenage girls entered the home of Daphne Boyden, the rapper's 17-year-old girlfriend and mother to his newborn son, killed her, abducted the infant, and set the home on fire in an attempt to cover up the crime. The case went unsolved for 6 years, and was featured on the television shows America's Most Wanted and Unsolved Mysteries.

In November 2002 an anonymous tip called in to Vallejo police led to the arrest of Latasha Brown, one of the killers, who had been raising the abducted infant as her own, along with her mother, Delores Ann Brown, who was also arrested. They were still living in Vallejo, not far from where Daphne Boyden was murdered. Latasha Brown's cousin Ocianetta Williams was identified as the second teenage girl responsible for the murder and abduction and both were arrested by the Vallejo Police Department. The then 6-year-old Le-Zhan was reunited with family soon after their arrest.

Young Lay was sentenced to a 12-year prison sentence for a 1999 armed robbery. He was released from prison in 2010.

== Discography ==
=== Studio albums ===
- Black 'N Dangerous (1996)
- Unsolved Mysteries (1998)
- Black 'N Dangerous: The Instrumentals (2007)

=== Compilation albums ===
- Young Lay Presents: Lifeline Original Soundtrack (2004)

=== Remix albums ===
- Don't Get It Twisted (2003)

=== Guest appearances ===
- 1996: "Pimp or Die" (Mac Mall feat. Ray Luv & Young Lay)
- 2000: "Love Me Then Hate Me" (Smoov-E feat. Young Lay)
