= Ya Boy =

American rapper from California

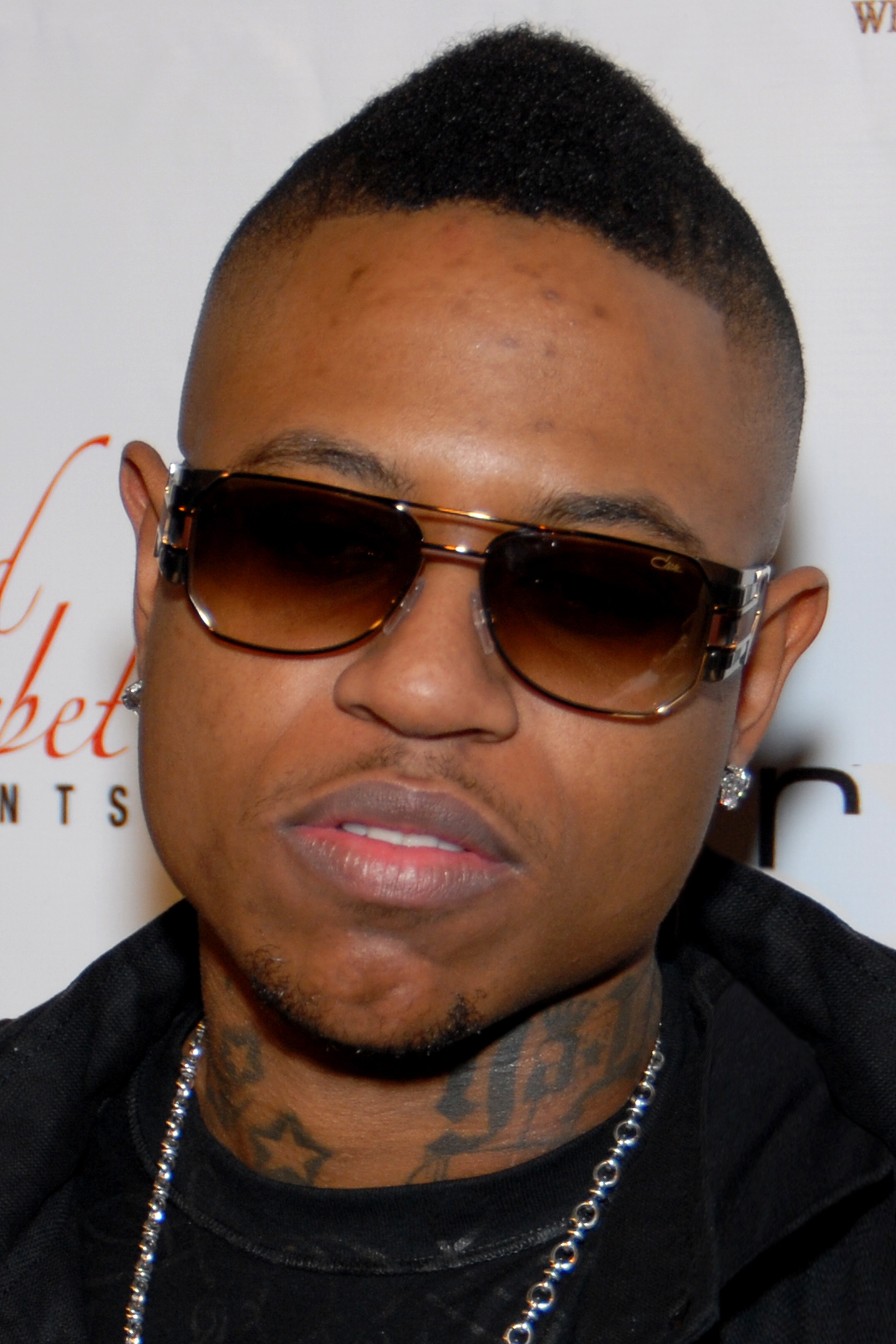
- Ya Boy in 2009

Background information
- Also known as: Rich Rocka
- Born: William Joseph Crawford; January 28, 1984 (age 42)
- Origin: San Francisco, California, U.S.
- Genres: Hip hop; West Coast hip hop; hyphy
- Occupations: Rapper; songwriter
- Instrument: Vocals
- Years active: 2002–present
- Labels: Black Card Music; E1; Konvict; KonLive; SMC; Hoo-Bangin'; Black Wall Street; Done Deal

William Joseph Crawford (born January 28, 1984), known by his stage name Ya Boy (also known as Rich Rocka), is an American rapper from Fillmore District, California. He is best known for his 2011 single "Lock Down" (with DJ Drama featuring Akon). The year prior, he signed with the latter's record label, Konvict Muzik, having first signed with San Quinn's Done Deal Entertainment to release his debut studio album, Rookie of the Year (2005). The following year, he signed with the Game's Black Wall Street Records, and later Mack 10's Hoo-Bangin' Records in 2009, although he released no albums with both labels.

== Early life ==
Crawford grew up in San Francisco's Fillmore District, and graduated from El Camino High School in South San Francisco.

His cousin is football player Stevie Johnson.

== Career ==
In 2005, Crawford signed with San Quinn's Done Deal Entertainment and SMC Recordings to release his debut album, Rookie of the Year in May of that year. In 2006, Crawford signed with the Game's record label The Black Wall Street Records, an imprint of Warner Bros. Records. After making an appearance on the label's collaborative mixtape, The Black Wall Street Journal, Vol. 1 (2006), Crawford began working with producers including Scott Storch, Araab Muzik and Cool & Dre, the latter of whom produced his 2008 standalone single, "Holla at Ya Boy".

In 2009, Crawford formed the record label Black Card Music, and signed himself and the label to Mack 10's Hoo-Bangin' Records. He released no projects with the label, and instead signed with Akon's labels Konvict Muzik and Kon Live Distribution in February 2010. The following August, he released the single "Party Girls" (featuring Rico Love), and later the single "Lockdown" (with DJ Drama featuring Akon) in late 2011. The latter song was shared with disc jockey DJ Drama as part of his third album, Third Power (2011). Crawford changed his stage name in favor of Rich Rocka in early 2013. He then released the mixtape Road 2 Rocka on July 4, 2013.

== Discography ==
=== Studio albums ===
- Rookie of the Year (2005)
- Rich Rocka (2013)

=== Mixtapes ===
Year	Title
2003	Mind Motion Rocks The Done Deal Party
2004	Fully Loaded Street Heat "16's Wit Me"
2005	The Future of the Franchise
2006	Chapter 1: The Rise
2007	Ya Boy Radio: Part One
2007	The Fix
2008	Optimus Rime
2008	I'm 'Bout to Murdah This Shit
2008	The Bay Area Bully
2009	Kush 2009
2009	Mohawks & Heavy Metal
2010	The Fix 2
2011	The Fillmore Renaissance Story
2011	Pray For Forgiveness (with DJ Paul and Lil Lody, hosted by DJ Scream)
2012	Trappy Birthday
2013	Road 2 Rocka
2014	Allegiance
2015	Rich Rocka II
2016	Alien
2016	Legacy
2016	Guilty by Association 2
2016	The Fix 3
2017	Definition of Explosive
2017	The Tonite Show
2017	Rocka World
2019	Lord Rocka
2023	Back From the Future 2
2025	Ya Boy vs Rich Rocka
