= Ray Luv =

American rapper

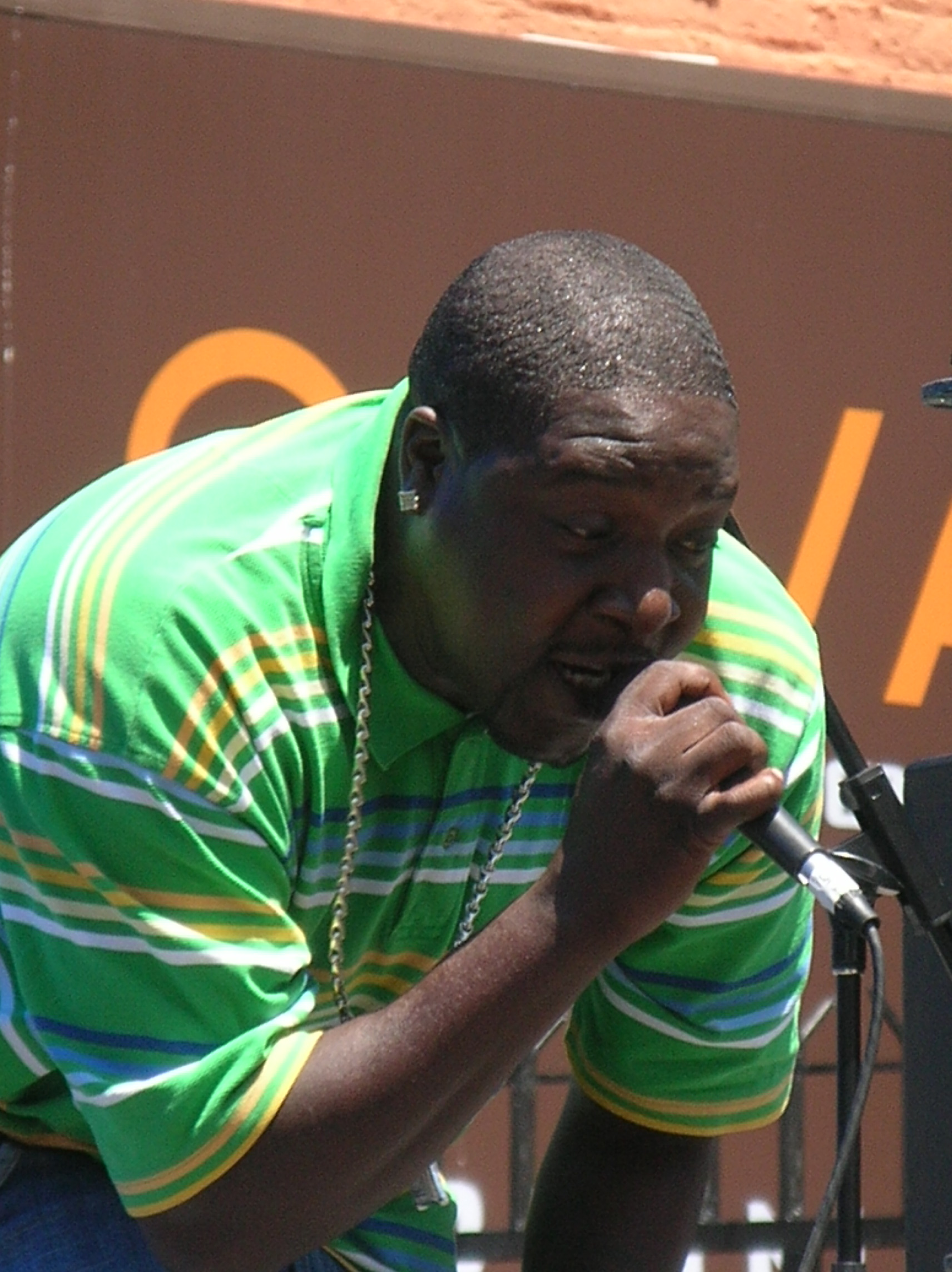
- Ray Luv in May 2009

Background information
- Born: Raymond Tyson; April 15, 1972 (age 54); New Orleans, Louisiana, United States
- Genres: West Coast Hip Hop, Gangsta Rap,
- Occupations: Rapper, Record Producer, Songwriter
- Years active: 1989–present
- Labels: Young Black Brotha, Priority Records, Interscope Records, Atlantic Records

Raymond Tyson, better known by his stage name Ray Luv, is an American Bay Area rapper from Santa Rosa, California, United States, who is best known for his contribution to the Bay Area hip hop scene in the mid-1990s.

== Biography ==
Raymond Tyson was born on April 15, 1972, in New Orleans, Louisiana, and was raised in Santa Rosa, California.

== Career ==
Early in his career Ray Luv performed alongside Tupac Shakur in the group Strictly Dope, a group based in Santa Rosa, California. In 1991, Ray was signed to the independent label Young Black Brotha Records by fellow friends Mac Dre and Mac Mall. Ray Luv has stated that he got his name from Tupac Shakur.

His first extended play Who Can Be Trusted? was released in 1993 by Young Black Brotha "Get Your Money On" from Trusted was popular on local radio at the time. That next year, Luv was featured on the Above The Rim soundtrack. Forever Hustlin', released in 1995 by Atlantic Records through the Bay Area label Young Black Brotha, was his major label debut; it reached #21 on the Billboard Top R&B/Hip Hop Albums chart.

One of Ray Luv's biggest singles "Last Nite", music video was directed by Tupac Shakur in 1994. He was longtime friends with Tupac and fellow Bay Area rappers, Mac Dre and Mac Mall.

In 1997, Luv contributed to the Bay Area rap compilation, Best of Da Bay: A Series of Slaps, from Young Black Brotha.

Ray Luv is co-owner of the bay area favorite online video series Pushin' The Bay TV, alongside the show's host Emcee T, a rapper who is also from Santa Rosa, California

== Discography ==
=== Studio albums ===
Title	Release	Peak chart positions	
Title	Release	US R&B	US Heat
Forever Hustlin	1995	21	16
Coup d'Etat	1998	29	—
A Prince in Exile	2002	35	—
Deathwish	2004	40	—

=== Collaboration albums ===
- Population Control (with Crimeseen) (2006)
- Boss Balla (with Emcee T) (2011)

=== Compilation albums ===
- Black Wall Street (with JT the Bigga Figga & Mac Mall) (2003)

=== Extended plays ===
- Who Can Be Trusted? (1993)
- Last Nite (1993)

=== Singles ===
Title	Release	Peak chart positions	Album
Title	Release	US Rap	Album
"Last Nite"	1994	16	Forever Hustlin'
"Definition of a Hustla"	1995	18	Forever Hustlin'
"Still Smokin Indo"	1995	21	Forever Hustlin'

=== Guest appearances ===
Title	Release	Peak chart positions	Album
Title	Release	US Rap	Album
"They Don't Understand" (Mac Dre featuring Ray Luv)	1993	9	Young Black Brotha
"Pimp Shit" (Mac Mall featuring Ray Luv and Mac Dre)	1993	18	Illegal Business?
"Born Hustlaz" (Ray Luv & RBL Posse)	1994	24	West Coast Bad Boyz Vol.1
"All About My Fetti" (Young Lay featuring Mac Mall & Ray Luv)	1995	21	New Jersey Drive, Vol. 1, Black 'N Dangerous
"Bay Area Playaz" (Mac Dre featuring Ray Luv, Mac Mall, Master P, Too Short, Young Lay)	1995	11	Dwellin' in tha Labb
"Pimp or Die " (Mac Mall featuring Ray Luv and Young Lay)	1996	27	Untouchable
"Cinnamon Waves" (Shock G featuring Ray Luv)	2000	35	
