= Sean T =

American rapper

- Born: Sean Miguel Thompson
- Origin: East Palo Alto, California, U.S.
- Genres: Hip hop, gangsta rap
- Occupations: Rapper; record producer
- Years active: 1989–present
- Labels: Murder One, Young Gotti, Get Gone
- Website: getgonerecords.com

Sean Miguel Thompson is an American rapper and producer from East Palo Alto, California. Throughout his career both as a rapper and a producer, he has released seven solo albums, two albums with his group Murder One Gangstas and has worked with some of California's top rappers, including E-40, C-Bo, and 3X Krazy.

== Biography ==
Sean T started his career in 1989 as a DJ before becoming a member of the rap group M.O.G. (short for Murder One Gangstas). The group released their debut album Exposed to the Game in 1992. A year later, Sean T released his first solo album, entitled Straight from the Streets. In addition to his solo work, Sean T has produced dozens of albums for various West Coast rappers and founded his own Get Gone Records label.

== Discography ==
=== Studio albums ===
- Straight from the Streets (1993)
- Pimp Lyrics & Dollar Signs (1996)
- Heated (2000)
- Can I Shine? (2001)
- Familiar Ground (2002)
- Terrain Boss (2003)
- Ain't Playin' (2005)

=== Collaboration albums ===
- Exposed to the Game with M.O.G. (1992)
- Still Exposed with M.O.G. (2002)

=== Extended plays ===
- My Testimony (2013)
