= Get Low Recordz =

Independent record label

- Founded: 1998
- Founder: JT the Bigga Figga
- Distributor: Priority Records
- Genre: Hip hop
- Country of origin: United States
- Location: Fillmore District, California

Get Low Recordz is a San Francisco based independent record label founded in 1991 by rapper and record producer JT the Bigga Figga. Artists who released material on Get Low Recordz included JT himself, Get Low Playaz, San Quinn, The Game and D-Moe. In 1994, the label entered a distribution deal with Priority Records, which lasted for one year.

The label was involved in a feud with Memphis Bleek's record label of the same name.

== Artists ==
- Tha Gamblaz
- JT the Bigga Figga
- The Fast One
- San Quinn
- D-Moe
- J La Rue
- Messy Marv
- Seff Tha Gaffla
- Get Low Playaz

== See also ==
- List of record labels
