= Messy Marv discography =

This is the discography of American rapper Messy Marv.

== Albums ==
=== Solo albums ===
- 1996: Messy Situationz
- 1999: Death On A Bitch
- 2001: Still Explosive
- 2002: Turf Politics
- 2004: DisoBAYish
- 2004: Different Slanguages (as MessCalen)
- 2004: The Block Files
- 2004: The Still Explosive Project (as MessCalen)
- 2005: Bandannas, Tattoos, & Tongue Rings
- 2005: Scrapers, Stunnas, & White Tees (as MessCalen)
- 2006: Hustlan.A.I.R.E.
- 2006: Gettin' That Guac (as MessCalen)
- 2006: What You Know Bout Me?
- 2006: What You Know Bout Me? (Part 2)
- 2008: Cake & Ice Cream
- 2009: Cake & Ice Cream 2
- 2009: The Tonite Show With Messy Marv (with DJ.Fresh)
- 2009: Northern Cali
- 2011: Kontrabrand
- 2012: Cake & Ice Cream 3
- 2013: Wake'n Dey Cook Game Up
- 2015: Trap Doin’ Numberz
- 2015: The Money In The B*tch Purse
- 2017: Still Marked For Death (Volume 1)
- 2017: Still Marked For Death (Volume 2)
- 2017: Still Marked For Death (Volume 3)
- 2017: Still Marked For Death (Volume 4)
- 2017: Still Marked For Death (Volume 5)
- 2022: The Tonite Show (Instrumentals) With Messy Marv (with DJ.Fresh)

=== Compilations ===
- 2006: Draped Up & Chipped Out
- 2006: The Features 2K6
- 2007: Muzik Fo' Tha Taliban
- 2007: Slangin' At The Corner Store (Block Edition)
- 2007: Filmoe Nation (Volume 1)
- 2007: Filmoe Nation (Volume 2)
- 2007: The Free Messy Marv Movement
- 2007: Draped Up & Chipped Out (Volume 2)
- 2008: Draped Up & Chipped Out (Volume 3)
- 2009: Draped Up & Chipped Out (Volume 4)
- 2009: The Best Of Messy Marv
- 2010: Dinosaur (The Collection) (Volume 1)
- 2010: City Life
- 2010: The Shooting Range (Part 1)
- 2010: The Shooting Range (Part 2)
- 2010: Millionaire Gangsta
- 2010: Thizz City
- 2011: The Shooting Range (Part 3)
- 2011: The Shooting Range (Part 4)
- 2011: The Shooting Range (Part 5)
- 2011: Goon Vitamins (Volume 1)
- 2011: Goon Vitamins (Volume 2)
- 2011: Goon Vitamins (Volume 3)
- 2011: Paper Bag Money
- 2012: The Definition Of Greed: Up All Night Hustlin’ (Volume 1)
- 2012: F*ck Too Short (Blood In Blood Out)
- 2012: Shots Fired
- 2012: A Hundred Planes
- 2023: Best Of Messy Marv (2005-2010) (Volume 1)
- 2026: The Features & The Remixes V.1

=== Collaboration albums ===
- 1998: Explosive Mode (with San Quinn)
- 2002: Turf Thuggin’ (with I-Rocc)
- 2003: Bonnie & Clyde (with Marvaless)
- 2004: The Re-Up (with I-Rocc)
- 2006: Explosive Mode 2: Back In Business (with San Quinn)
- 2006: Explosive Mode 3: The MOB Gets Explosive (with San Quinn & Husalah & The Jacka)
- 2006: 100 Racks (with Yukmouth)
- 2006: The Infrastructure (with Guce, as Bullys Wit Fullys)
- 2007: Da Bidness (with P.S.D. Tha Drivah & Keak Da Sneak)
- 2007: Messy Slick (with Mitchy Slick)
- 2007: Guerilla Red (with Prince Bugsy)
- 2008: The Best Of Bullys Wit Fullys – The Movement (with Bullys Wit Fullys)
- 2008: Fillmoe Hard Heads (with JT The Bigga Figga & San Quinn)
- 2009: Blow (with Berner)
- 2009: Tha 2nd & 3rd Letter (with T-Nutty)
- 2010: Blow: Blocks And Boat Docks (with Berner)
- 2010: Blood Gang Music (with The Game)
- 2010: Jonestown (with Blanco & The Jacka)
- 2010: Da Bidness Part II (with P.S.D. Tha Drivah & Keak Da Sneak)
- 2011: Atlantic City (with Melo)
- 2011: Neighborhood Supastar 3 (with Philthy Rich)
- 2012: My World (with Young Slug)
- 2012: AM To The PM (with Young Doe)
- 2014: Messy Marv Vs Philthy Rich (with Philthy Rich)
- 2014: One Hunnid (with Blanco & The Jacka)
- 2015: Good For Nothing (with Berner)
- 2015: Rubber Ducks & Gucci Duffles (with DZ)
- 2017: Mall & Mess (with Mall Tsunami)
- 2018: Explosive Mode 4: Explosive As Usual (with San Quinn)
- 2018: When You A Threat You A Target (with Shill Mac)
- 2018: Chow Time (with Mozzy)
- 2021: Pain Killers (with Troublez)
- 2022: The Streets Get Messy (with P. Street)
- 2024: Well Connected (with San Quinn & Jocnation)

=== Mixtapes ===
- 2003: The Ko-Alition - Click Clack Gang Mixtape (Volume 1)
- 2006: HollyHood The Mixtape
- 2006: West Coast Gangsta (Volume 16)
- 2008: A Hustlas Motivation (Volume 1) (as The Boy Boy Young Mess)
- 2008: A Hustlas Motivation (Volume 2) (as The Boy Boy Young Mess)
- 2008: A Hustlas Motivation (Volume 3) (as The Boy Boy Young Mess)
- 2009: Prices On My Head: Thug Money On Ya Family (Volume 1) (as The Boy Boy Young Mess)
- 2009: Prices On My Head: Thug Money on Ya Family (Volume 2) (as The Boy Boy Young Mess)
- 2009: Highly Aggressive (Volume 1) (as The Boy Boy Young Mess)
- 2010: Highly Aggressive (Volume 2) (as The Boy Boy Young Mess)
- 2010: Nemmo: Paystyle Flow - No Pen (Volume 1) (as The Boy Boy Young Mess)
- 2010: Nemmo: Paystyle Flow - No Pen (Volume 2) (as The Boy Boy Young Mess)
- 2010: Skrillionaire
- 2010: Urban Legend
- 2011: Kokaine Ballads Frum My S550 (as The Boy Boy Young Mess)
- 2012: Da New Frank Lukas Dat Neva Wore Da Mink Coat (as The Boy Boy Young Mess)

== Messy Marv Presents ==
- 2007: The Click Clack Gangs Gutta Mob - Gutta Or Nuttin’
- 2008: Royal HiniSS - Project Celebrities
- 2011: Pittsburgh Philthy - Pittbull Vicious
- 2012: Feva - Pay Da Fee
- 2018: JocNation - Well Connected (with San Quinn)
