= Draped Up and Chipped Out, Vol. 3 =

Draped Up & Chipped Out, Vol. 3

Studio album by Messy Marv
- Released: December 9, 2008
- Genre: Gangsta rap, hyphy
- Length: 1:19:21
- Label: Scalen Records/SMC Recordings
- Producer: Messy Marv

Messy Marv chronology
Cake & Ice Cream (2008)	Draped Up & Chipped Out, Vol. 3 (2008)	Cake & Ice Cream 2 (2009)

Draped Up & Chipped Out, Vol. 3 is a compilation album by American rapper Messy Marv, released on December 9, 2008. It peaked at #50 on the R&B/Hip-Hop Albums chart, #27 on the Heatseekers Albums chart, and #16 on the Heatseekers Albums chart. It is the third, and most successful, album of his Draped Up & Chipped Out series, and one of the most successful albums of his career. It includes performances by Krizz Kaliko, Tech N9ne, Killer Mike, Capone-N-Noreaga, Sean T, Mistah F.A.B., Jay Rock and Yukmouth, and a guest appearance from Keak da Sneak, among others.

== Track listing ==
#	Title	length
1	Imma Superstar (Produced by The Legion)	4:16
2	Salute (performed by Krizz Kaliko, Tech N9ne & Big Scoob)	5:02
3	Hogg Anthem (performed by Glasses Malone, Jay Rock & Big Wy)	4:15
4	Til I Float (performed by PSD)	4:27
5	Chadada-Adada (performed by Lameeze)	2:47
6	Down Fo'the Kick Doe (performed by Killer Mike, Nario & Gangsta Pill)	3:05
7	Gotham City (performed by Project Celebs)	3:42
8	Hotel Keys (performed by Matt blaque & D'Wayne Wiggins)	3:22
9	Trapped in a Rapper's Body (performed by The Politician & V-White)	3:46
10	Dr. Purp Thumb (performed by G-Stack)	3:40
11	On Errythang (featuring Seff tha Gaffla & Keak da Sneak)	5:12
12	My Buddy (performed by Dem Hoodstarz)	3:41
13	Throw Ya Hood Up (performed by Mistah F.A.B.)	4:02
14	Mac Hang Low (performed by 1st 48 & Capone-N-Noreaga)	3:01
15	Ain't Did S**t (performed by Sean T)	4:05
16	New West (performed by Balance, Crooked & The Juice)	3:35
17	Dey Make Those?	3:15
18	Wanna Be Me (performed by Krondon & Mitchy Slick)	3:20
19	Back Back (performed by Fee, Sliccs Gotcha & Rushen Roulette)	4:27
20	Cognac Dreams (performed by Jessica Rabbit, Keak da Sneak & Yukmouth)	3:04
21	I Go (performed by Young Boo & Homewrecka)	3:36
