= Messy Slick =

Studio album by Messy Marv & Mitchy Slick
- Released: March 27, 2007
- Genre: Hip hop
- Length: 48:21
- Label: Siccness.net
- Producer: Messy Marv, Tha Bizness, Traxamillion, Batkave, Cricket for Cracels, Dow Jones, Dubb Knoxx, J. Hen, Ecay Uno

Messy Marv & Mitchy Slick chronology
| What You Know bout Me? Part 2 (2006) | Messy Slick (2007) | Draped Up & Chipped Out, Vol. 2 (2007) |

Messy Slick is a collaboration album between American rappers Messy Marv and Mitchy Slick, released on March 27, 2007. It peaked at #95 on the R&B/Hip-Hop Albums chart. It includes guest appearances from Yukmouth, Keak da Sneak, Rah2K, Damu, T-Nutty, Tiny Doo, Styles P and Krondon.

== Track listing ==
| # | Title | length |
|---|---|---|
| 1 | Intro (Rah2K) (featuring Rah2K) | 0:33 |
| 2 | Click Clack | 3:37 |
| 3 | On the One (featuring Yukmouth) | 3:39 |
| 4 | OK | 3:23 |
| 5 | Skit | 0:25 |
| 6 | 2nd Letter (featuring Damu) | 4:20 |
| 7 | Rollie on My Arm (featuring Styles P & Turf Talk) | 4:17 |
| 8 | Big Gunz (featuring Tiny Doo) | 4:15 |
| 9 | Diego to da Bay | 4:01 |
| 10 | Cherish a Thug (featuring Keak da Sneak) | 3:38 |
| 11 | Hey (featuring Krondon) | 3:59 |
| 12 | Try'n to Get a Dolla (featuring Tiny Doo) | 4:13 |
| 13 | Take That Cream (featuring Tiny Doo) | 4:02 |
| 14 | 2 Bombs (featuring 211) | 3:59 |
| 15 | Siccness Anthem (featuring Damu & T-Nutty) | 4:02 |
