= The Shooting Range =

Compilation album by Messy Marv
- Released: August 2010
- Genre: Hip hop
- Length: 1:14:09
- Label: Clickclack Records

Messy Marv chronology
Thizz City (2010)	The Shooting Range (2010)	Blow: Blocks and Boat Docks (2010)

The Shooting Range is a compilation album by American rapper Messy Marv, released in August 2010, via Clickclack Records. The first of the Shooting Range series, the album features guest appearances from D.O.E., Young Doe, Glasses Malone and The Jacka, among others. It peaked on the Top R&B/Hip-Hop Albums chart at No. 85.

== Track listing ==
#	Title	length
1	I Got The Line (featuring Lee Majors)	3:32
2	My Money (featuring DZ)	3:31
3	Let's Play Ball (featuring Dem Hoodstarz)	3:28
4	Cheese On Da Bread (featuring Fed-X)	3:34
5	Playin' God (featuring Slick Litt)	3:56
6	What I'm Bout (featuring Mac T)	3:39
7	You Neva Know (featuring Husalah)	4:52
8	Still Wit Da B.S. (featuring Glasses Malone)	2:11
9	Blood In Blood Out (featuring Mitchy Slick)	4:24
10	I'm Thorough (featuring Young Doe)	4:43
11	Light Ya Cigar (featuring DZ & Glasses Malone)	4:17
12	Wud Up (featuring Papa Smurf)	4:04
13	Hard 2 Breathe (featuring D.O.E.)	3:50
14	100 (featuring Spider Loc)	3:28
15	Mob Shit (featuring The Jacka)	3:38
16	It's Goin' Down (featuring Chop Black & Philthy Rich)	3:44
17	Doin' Me (featuring Killa Keise & Da Robba)	4:23
18	Made It This Far (featuring Black C & Simon)	4:20
19	Put Some $ On It (featuring DZ)	4:35
