= Thizz City =

Compilation album by Messy Marv
- Released: August 10, 2010
- Genre: Rap
- Label: Thizz City, SMC Recordings

Messy Marv chronology
Millionaire Gangsta (2010)	Thizz City (2010)	Blow: Blocks and Boat Docks (2010)

Thizz City is a compilation album by American rapper Messy Marv, released on August 10, 2010, via SMC Recordings. The album includes performances by San Quinn, Berner and Cellski, among others, and guest appearances from Keak da Sneak, Glasses Malone, Skaz One and more. Thizz City charted on the Top R&B/Hip-Hop Albums chart.

== Track listing ==
#	Title	Producer	length
1	Intro	Dex Beats	2:43
2	If You Wanna Bang (performed by Cellski, Telly Mac & Tay Assassin)	Cellski	4:34
3	Thizz City		3:52
4	They (performed by Berner)	Cy Fyre	3:29
5	Motorbike		3:06
6	Ca$h Not Ass (performed by Roach Gigz)	Remedy	3:15
7	Vanilla Wafers (also performed by Big Cheese, Pac B & P-Gun)		3:39
8	911 (performed by Killa Keise featuring Scrooge)	DJ Fresh	3:45
9	Leather (also performed by Berner and Skaz One)	StinJ-E	4:29
10	Bounty (performed by Cam City)		3:54
11	Ride With Me (featuring DZ)		4:16
12	Real N***a (performed by Lars Locs)		4:24
13	Your Girlfriend Like Me (performed by Kev Kelley featuring Messy Marv)	SlapBoyz	3:57
14	567 (performed by The Taliban)		4:20
15	Super Sco Biz (performed by B.I.G. [B***h! I Go])	Roach Gigz	3:33
16	Purple In the Air (performed by San Quinn & Seff da Gaffla)		2:47
17	Last One Gone (performed by Hustle Boyz featuring Glasses Malone)		4:59
18	Swagga Jackin' (Remix) [performed by Balance featuring Erk tha Jerk, Keak da Sneak, Messy Marv, Big Rich & Clyde Carson]	Dem Jointz	4:09
19	B-Dot Bang (performed by Boo Banga)		4:45
20	Bass Rock (performed by Don Toriano)	Dunce	2:56
21	Can I Rap (performed by Roach Gigz)	C-Loz	2:57
22	Frisco (Where You At) [performed by Evenodds]	D.E.O.	2:49
23	Murder (performed by AR, Lil Joke & Young Shadd)		4:14
24	Outro (performed by Oakdale Mac)	Dex Beats	2:47
