= Da Baydestrian =

Studio album by Mistah F.A.B.
- Released: May 15, 2007
- Recorded: 2006–2007
- Genre: Hip hop; hyphy
- Length: 1:12:45
- Label: SMC Recordings; Thizz Entertainment
- Producer: Mistah F.A.B. (exec.); Desrie Jeffery (exec.); Rob-E; Gennessee; Bedrock; Maxwell Smart; Politics; Sean T; Trackademicks; Traxamillion; Young L

Mistah F.A.B. chronology
| Son of a Pimp (2005) | Da Baydestrian (2007) | Da Yellow Bus Rydah (2012) |

Professional ratings
Review scores
| Source | Rating |
|---|---|
| HipHopDX | 4/5 stars |
| RapReviews | 9/10 stars |
| XXL | 4/5 stars |
| DJBooth.net | 4/5 stars |

Da Baydestrian is the third studio album by American rapper Mistah F.A.B. from Oakland, California. It was released on May 15, 2007, via SMC Recordings and Thizz Entertainment. Production was handled by several record producers, including Gennessee Lewis, Maxwell Smart, Sean T, Traxamillion, Rob-E, Bedrock, Politics, Trackademicks, and Young L. It also features guest appearances from Keak da Sneak, Messy Marv, Spice 1, Too $hort, Fabo, 2Dolla, Dogwood, Dyson, and J. Nash.

The album peaked at number 177 on the US Billboard 200 and number 47 on the Top R&B/Hip-Hop Albums chart.

== Track listing ==
| No. | Title | Producer(s) | Length |
|---|---|---|---|
| 1. | "Baydestrian" | Rob-E | 3:48 |
| 2. | "Sideshow (Remix)" (featuring Keak Da Sneak & Too $hort) | Traxamillion | 3:24 |
| 3. | "Life on Track" (featuring J. Nash) | Rob-E | 4:28 |
| 4. | "Jamonie Robinson" | Maxwell Smart | 4:51 |
| 5. | "Furley Ghost" | Trackademiks | 4:16 |
| 6. | "Crack Baby Anthem" (featuring Messy Marv) | Sean T | 4:42 |
| 7. | "Fight Music" | Rob-E | 4:28 |
| 8. | "On Yo' Way" (featuring Dyson & Too $hort) | Bedrock | 4:56 |
| 9. | "Shorty Tryin' 2 Get By" (featuring Gennessee) | Gennessee | 4:42 |
| 10. | "Race 4 Ya' Pink Slips" (featuring Keak Da Sneak, Spice 1) | Politics | 3:31 |
| 11. | "Dem Cars" | Rob-E | 3:14 |
| 12. | "Get This Together" | Rob-E | 5:00 |
| 13. | "Can't Wait" (featuring Dogwood) | Gennessee | 3:24 |
| 14. | "Feelin' Fine" (featuring Dogwood) | Gennessee | 4:34 |
| 15. | "Goin' Crazy (Big Ol' Butt)" (featuring 2 Dolla, Fabo & Too $hort) | Young L | 3:15 |
| 16. | "Deepest Thoughts" | Gennessee | 4:07 |
| 17. | "100 Bars" | Rob-E | 6:06 |
| Total length: | | | 1:12:45 |

== Personnel ==
- Stanley P. Cox Jr – main artist, executive producer
- Todd Anthony Shaw – featured artist (tracks: 2, 8, 15)
- Charles Toby Bowens – featured artist (tracks: 2, 10)
- Marvin Watson – featured artist (track 6)
- Gennessee Lewis – featured artist (track 9), producer (tracks: 9, 13, 14, 16)
- Robert L. Green Jr. – featured artist (track 10)
- Lefabian Williams – featured artist (track 15)
- Rob Enea – producer (tracks: 1, 3, 7, 11, 12, 17)
- Sultan Banks – producer (track 2)
- Max Perry – producer (track 4)
- Jason Valerio – producer (track 5)
- Sean Miguel Thompson – producer (track 6)
- Joseph Epperson – producer (track 8)
- Lloyd Omadhebo – producer (track 15)
- Michael Denten – mixing & mastering
- Deegan Mack Adams – mixing
- Desrie Jeffery – executive producer
- Monte "Mont Rock" Malone – production coordinator
- Vivian Chen – photography
- Dow Jones – A&R
- Will Bronson – A&R

== Charts ==
| Chart (2007) | Peak position |
|---|---|
| US Billboard 200 | 177 |
| US Top R&B/Hip-Hop Albums (Billboard) | 47 |
| US Top Rap Albums (Billboard) | 21 |
| US Independent Albums (Billboard) | 20 |
| US Heatseekers Albums (Billboard) | 7 |
