= Son of a Pimp =

Studio album by Mistah F.A.B.
- Released: April 19, 2005
- Recorded: 2004–2005
- Genre: Hip hop; hyphy
- Length: 1:13:24
- Label: Thizz Entertainment
- Producer: Trackademicks; Gennessee; Clipto; CMT; Droop-E; E-A-Ski; G.A.; Kanye West; Sean T; Swamp Kat; Teddy Bishop; Ruff

Mistah F.A.B. chronology
Nig-Latin (2003)	Son of a Pimp (2005)	Da Baydestrian (2007)

Son of a Pimp is the second studio album by American rapper Mistah F.A.B. from Oakland, California. It was released on April 19, 2005 via Thizz Entertainment. Production was handled by several record producers, including Droop-E, E-A-Ski, Gennessee Lewis, Kanye West and Sean T among others. It also features guest appearances by the likes of Bavgate, E-40, G-Stack, Mac Dre (who was shot and killed 6½ months prior to the album's release), Mac Mall, Messy Marv, Miami, PSD, The Jacka, Turf Talk, and Yukmouth among others. A sequel to the album, Son of a Pimp Part 2, was released on May 27, 2016.

== Track listing ==
No.	Title	Producer(s)	Length
1.	"Intro" (featuring Fabby's Mom)		1:14
2.	"Big Time"	Kanye West	3:41
3.	"Crush on You"	Teddy Bishop	3:55
4.	"Streets of the Bay" (featuring PSD)	Clipto	3:32
5.	"Do It Live for Me" (featuring G-Stack & Mac Mall)	Trackademicks	4:00
6.	"Hey Little Mama" (featuring Johnny Ca$h & The Jacka)	Trackademicks	3:55
7.	"Kicked Out the Club"	Sean T	4:35
8.	"Call Heaven"	Trackademicks	3:50
9.	"Hoodlife" (featuring Harm)	Swampcat	4:14
10.	"Let Me Do My Thang" (featuring Kato, Yukmouth & LB)	Ruff	4:25
11.	"Super Sic Wit It" (featuring E-40 & Turf Talk)	Droop-E	3:30
12.	"If "If" Was a 5th"	Trackademicks	3:54
13.	"If Papa Was Home" (featuring Patrick Anderson)	Gennessee	3:30
14.	"Mama Song" (featuring Dyson)	Trackademicks	4:14
15.	"N.E.W. Oakland" (featuring Bavgate & G-Stack)	CMT; E-A-Ski	3:47
16.	"City Limits" (featuring Messy Marv & Mr. Kee)	The Ear Hustlers	3:23
17.	"Dis Is How da Game Goes" (featuring Mac Dre & Miami)	G.A.	4:51
18.	"Where's My Daddy"	Gennessee	4:01
19.	"U R My Angel"	Trackademicks	4:53
Total length:			1:13:24
