= Gotti (Berner album) =

GOTTI

Studio album by Berner
- Released: December 3, 2021
- Genre: Hip hop
- Length: 57:52
- Label: Bern One Entertainment; EMPIRE
- Producer: Berner (exec.); Aurora Beats; Authentik; CJ Washington; Cozmo; Daniel Cruz; Flex on the Beat; FOREVEROLLING; Max Perry; Nabeyin; Omar Grand; RBP; Tony Butcha; Traxx FDR; Vidal Garcia; ZBeatz

Berner chronology
Paulie Cicero (2021)	GOTTI (2021)	From Seed to Sale (2022)

Professional ratings
Review scores
Source	Rating
AllMusic	3.5/5 stars
RapReviews	5.5/10

Gotti is a solo album by American rapper Berner. It was released on December 3, 2021, via Bern One Entertainment/EMPIRE. Production was primarily handled by Cozmo. It features guest appearances from Cozmo, Benny the Butcher, Conway the Machine, Kevin Cossom, Future, Jadakiss, Madeline Lauer, Janelle Marie, Millyz, Mozzy, Nas, Ryn Nicole, Rod Wave, Rick Ross, Styles P, Ty Dolla $ign, Wiz Khalifa, and John Gotti's trial tapes. On the Billboard charts in the United States, the album peaked at number 23 on the Billboard 200, number 11 on Top R&B/Hip-Hop Albums, number 4 on Top Rap Albums, and number 2 on the Independent Albums chart.

== Track listing ==
No.	Title	Writer(s)	Producer(s)	Length
1.	"Untouchable (Intro)" (featuring John Gotti)	Gilbert Anthony Milam Jr.; John Joseph Gotti		0:27
2.	"Draped Up" (featuring Future)	Milam Jr.; Nayvadius Wilburn; Cosmo Hickox; Aaron Butler; Jeffrey Lynn Jones Jr.	Cozmo; Forever Rolling; Flex	3:56
3.	"1st 48" (featuring Cozmo)	Milam Jr.; Hickox; Butler; Jones Jr.	Cozmo; Forever Rolling; Flex	2:53
4.	"Silence"	Milam Jr.	Cozmo	3:00
5.	"Too Many Goats" (featuring Jadakiss, Rick Ross, Nas and Kevin Cossom)	Milam Jr.; Jason Phillips; William Leonard Roberts II; Nasir Jones; Kevin Cossom	Cozmo; Vidal Garcia	4:15
6.	"Lonely at the Top" (featuring Rod Wave)	Milam Jr.; Rodarius Marcell Green	Cozmo; Vidal Garcia; Daniel Cruz; Gennessee; CJ Washington	4:32
7.	"Legacy"	Milam Jr.	Cozmo; Vidal Garcia	3:06
8.	"Pound for Pound" (featuring John Gotti, Mozzy, Conway the Machine, Styles P and Benny the Butcher)	Milam Jr.; Gotti; Timothy Patterson; Demond Price; David Styles; Jeremie Pennick	Cozmo; Daniel Cruz; ZBeats (co.)	4:49
9.	"Slow Down" (featuring Ty Dolla $ign)	Milam Jr.; Tyrone William Griffin Jr.	Vidal Garcia; Cozmo	3:18
10.	"Zoning" (featuring Ryn Nicole)	Milam Jr.	Cozmo; Tony Butcha	3:12
11.	"Morals (Interlude)" (featuring John Gotti)	Milam Jr.; Gotti		0:21
12.	"Bucket List" (featuring Cozmo)	Milam Jr.; Hickox	Nabeyin; Cozmo; Omar Grand; Authentik Beats	3:09
13.	"Next Level" (featuring Millyz)	Milam Jr.	Cozmo	3:16
14.	"Big Chain" (featuring Wiz Khalifa)	Milam Jr.; Cameron Jibril Thomaz; Hickox; Daniel Cruz; Max Perry; Russell Pochop	Cozmo; Daniel Cruz; Max Perry; RBP	4:12
15.	"Running Numbers" (featuring Cozmo)	Milam Jr.	Cozmo; Traxx FDR; Vidal Garcia	3:02
16.	"Pac Vibes" (featuring Cozmo)	Milam Jr.; Hickox	Vidal Garcia; Cozmo; CJ Washington	3:21
17.	"Side Tracked"	Milam Jr.	Traxx FDR	3:27
18.	"Karma" (featuring Janelle Marie and Madeline Lauer)	Milam Jr.	Daniel Cruz; Cozmo; Aurola	3:07
19.	"Above the Law (Outro)" (featuring John Gotti)	Milam Jr.; Gotti		0:30
Total length:				57:52

Deluxe edition bonus tracks
No.	Title	Writer(s)	Length
20.	"Make It Look Easy" (featuring Lil Durk)	Milam Jr.; Durk D. Banks	3:18
21.	"Whiplash" (featuring Young Money Mitch)	Milam Jr.	4:41

== Charts ==
Chart (2021)	Peak position
US Billboard 200	23
US Top R&B/Hip-Hop Albums (Billboard)	11
US Top Rap Albums (Billboard)	4
US Independent Albums (Billboard)	2
