= Hempire =

Studio album by Berner
- Released: April 15, 2016
- Genre: Hip hop
- Length: 74:42
- Label: Bern One
- Producer: Cozmo; D Wellz; Drumma Boy; Maejor; Max Perry; Nima Fadavi; Jeev; Scoop DeVille; The Elevaterz; TM88; Traxx FDR

Berner chronology
Drought Season 3 (2015)	Hempire (2016)	Public Enemies (2016)

Professional ratings
Review scores
Source	Rating
AllMusic	3.5/5 stars
HipHopDX	3.4/5

Hempire is the fourth solo full-length studio album by American rapper Berner. It was released on April 15, 2016 via Bern One Entertainment. Production was handled by several record producers, including Drumma Boy, Max Perry, Scoop DeVille and TM88. It features guest appearances from Wiz Khalifa, B-Real, Atmosphere, Mistah F.A.B., Cozmo, Freeze, Hollywood, Juicy J, K Camp, Lil' Kim, Maejor, Project Pat, Quez, Smiggz, Snoop Dogg, Strap and Young Dolph. The album peaked at number 54 on the Billboard 200.

== Track listing ==
Hempire track listing
No.	Title	Length
1.	"Home"	3:23
2.	"Life Goes On"	3:30
3.	"Burn One" (featuring Quez and Strap)	4:48
4.	"Best Thang Smokin'" (featuring Wiz Khalifa, Snoop Dogg and B-Real)	4:18
5.	"Seal" (featuring Wiz Khalifa and K Camp)	3:54
6.	"Homeboys" (featuring Freeze)	4:41
7.	"Telephone"	3:21
8.	"Murals/Changes" (featuring Atmosphere and Mistah F.A.B.)	8:01
9.	"Gunplay" (featuring Hollywood)	2:25
10.	"Kansas City/Drug Runner" (featuring Young Dolph and Project Pat)	6:07
11.	"Plug Name"	2:45
12.	"Am I Wrong" (featuring Maejor)	3:13
13.	"All We Do" (featuring Wiz Khalifa and Juicy J)	5:08
14.	"Cream"	3:04
15.	"Still Rich" (featuring Wiz Khalifa and Lil' Kim)	4:32
16.	"Next Up" (featuring Cozmo)	3:44
17.	"Feel" (featuring Smiggz)	3:53
18.	"Last Run"	3:55
Total length:		104:42

== Charts ==
Chart performance for Hempire
Chart (2016)	Peak position
US Billboard 200	54
US Top R&B/Hip-Hop Albums (Billboard)	6
US Top Rap Albums (Billboard)	4
US Independent Albums (Billboard)	6
