= 20 Lights =

EP by Berner
- Released: January 6, 2015
- Genre: Hip hop
- Length: 29:56
- Label: Bern One Entertainment
- Producer: Berner (exec.); Taylor Gang (exec.); Cheeze; Cozmo; Ricky P; Sean T; Sledgren; The Elevaterz; Max Perry

Berner chronology
Prohibition (2014)	20 Lights (2015)	Contraband (2015)

Professional ratings
Review scores
Source	Rating
AllMusic	3.5/5 stars

20 Lights is the first solo extended play by American rapper Berner. It was released on January 6, 2015, via Bern One Entertainment. Production was handled by Cheeze, Cozmo, Ricky P, Sean T, Sledgren, The Elevaterz and Max Perry. It features guest appearances from Ampichino, Curren$y, Mac Dre, Migos, Smiggz, The Jacka and Wiz Khalifa. The album peaked at number 95 on the Billboard 200. Music video for "OT" was directed by David Camarena.

== Track listing ==
No.	Title	Producer(s)	Length
1.	"Dizzy"	Sledgren; Ricky P	3:16
2.	"OT" (featuring Wiz Khalifa)	Cozmo	5:02
3.	"3 Mill"	The Elevaterz	2:38
4.	"Cry" (featuring The Jacka, Curren$y and Smiggz)	Cheeze	4:17
5.	"Dump" (featuring Mac Dre)	Sean T; Max Perry (co.)	2:35
6.	"Pass Me the Green" (featuring Migos)	The Elevaterz	4:20
7.	"Breathe/Dreaming" (featuring Ampichino)	The Elevaterz	7:48
Total length:			29:56

== Charts ==
Chart (2015)	Peak position
US Billboard 200	95
US Top R&B/Hip-Hop Albums (Billboard)	10
US Top Rap Albums (Billboard)	6
US Independent Albums (Billboard)	4
US Indie Store Album Sales (Billboard)	5
