= DisoBAYish =

Studio album by Messy Marv
- Released: March 9, 2004
- Recorded: 2003–2004
- Genre: West Coast hip hop
- Label: Sumday
- Producer: Marvin "Messy Marv" Watson Jr.

Messy Marv chronology
Turf Politics (2002)	DisoBAYish (2004)	Different Slanguages (2004)

DisoBAYish is the fifth studio album by rapper Messy Marv, released on March 9, 2004. Guest appearances on the album include Yukmouth, E-40, Too Short, and Nate Dogg. It peaked at number 76 on the Billboard Top R&B/Hip-Hop Albums, and number 49 on the Billboard Top Independent Albums.

== Track listing ==
1. "Baby Bintro"
2. "You Already Know" (feat. Yukmouth)
3. "Hypnotic" (feat. Missippi)
4. "That's What's Up!"
5. "Dick Head" (skit)
6. "Stop Callin'" (feat. E-40)
7. "Blades" (feat. D'wayne Wiggins & Billy Cook)
8. "Baby" (feat. Missippi)
9. "Like What! (Bad Boppas in the Club)"
10. "Can't Nobody" (feat. Too Short & Mr. Lucci)
11. "Chicken Head Hoes" (skit)
12. "Oh No, Pt. 2" (feat. Nate Dogg)
13. "Until 4:00" (feat. Rich the Factor & Rushin Roolet)
14. "Well..." (feat. Ive Low)
15. "In Front of the Buildings"
16. "The Flame" (feat. Siegal)

== Production ==
- Kream Team – track 2, 4, 8, 9
- Rick Rock – track 3, 14–16
- Aa Gee – track 6
- D'wayne Wiggins – track 7
- Pharmaceuticals – track 10
- DJ Daryl – track 12
- Rich the Factor – track 13
