= Hustlan.A.I.R.E. =

Studio album by Messy Marv
- Released: July 18, 2006
- Recorded: 2003–2006
- Genre: West Coast hip hop, hyphy
- Label: Scalen LLC.
- Producer: Marvin "Messy Marv" Watson Jr.

Messy Marv chronology
Scrapers, Stunnas & White Tees (2005)	Hustlan.A.I.R.E. (2006)	Gettin' That Guac (2006)

Hustlan.A.I.R.E. is a studio album released by Messy Marv on July 18, 2006. Guest appearances on the album include Birdman, Keak Da Sneak, Lucci, The Click Clack Gang, E-40, B-Legit & Noble.

The song, "C of A", originally appeared on the 2002 Messy Marv album, Turf Politics, as "Center of Attention".

== Track listing ==
1. "I'm Shinin'"
2. "Real Life"
3. "Ain't No Cut on Me" (featuring Birdman)
4. "Pop That Nigga"
5. "My Potna"
6. "Stuntin'"
7. "Thug Life"
8. "Dangerous" (featuring Keak Da Sneak)
9. "Crazy" (featuring Lucci)
10. "Make Room"
11. "Where I'm Bout 2 Go"
12. "So Hot" (featuring The Click Clack Gang)
13. "C of A" (featuring E-40 & B-Legit)
14. "Street Law" (featuring Noble)
