= Prices on My Head: Thug Money on Ya Family, Vol. 1 =

Mixtape by The Boy Boy Young Mess
- Released: June 23, 2009
- Genre: Rap
- Label: Click Clack Records, INgrooves

The Boy Boy Young Mess chronology
Cake & Ice Cream 2 (2009)	Prices on My Head: Thug Money on Ya Family, Vol. 1 (2009)	Draped Up and Chipped Out, Vol. 4 (2009)

Prices on My Head: Thug Money on Ya Family, Vol. 1 is a mixtape by American rapper The Boy Boy Young Mess, released in June 2009 via his label Click Clack Records and INgrooves. The first of his Prices on My Head series, it is his only album not to have any guest appearances. It peaked at #93 on the Top R&B/Hip-Hop Albums chart.

== Track listing ==
#	Title	length
1	"Prices on My Head (Intro)"	3:40
2	I Run This B*tch	3:21
3	Talk Like Money	3:17
4	Get Yo Ass In the Kitchen	2:46
5	My Chain	3:28
6	To All My Hataz	3:28
7	Bad Yellow B*tch	2:51
8	Funky Ass B*tch (Skit)	2:43
9	Got Some Money for That Sh*t	3:01
10	Steppin Out the Phantom	2:15
11	Talkin' Bout	2:23
12	Hate On Me	3:15
13	I'm On That	2:59
