= Draped Up & Chipped Out, Vol. 2 =

Compilation album by Messy Marv
- Released: November 6, 2007
- Genre: Rap
- Length: 57:34
- Label: SMC Recordings
- Producer: DJ Daryl, Seanie T.

Messy Marv chronology
Messy Slick (2007)	Draped Up & Chipped Out, Vol. 2 (2007)	Cake & Ice Cream (2008)

Draped Up & Chipped Out, Vol. 2 is a compilation album by the American rapper Messy Marv, released on November 6, 2007. It peaked at #77 on the R&B/Hip-Hop Albums chart, #33 on the Heatseekers Albums chart, #1 on the Top Heatseekers Pacific chart, and #8 on the Top Heatseekers West North Central chart. It is the second album of his Draped Up & Chipped Out series and includes performances by B-Legit & Mistah F.A.B., as well as guest appearances from Sean Paul, Juvenile, Mike Jones and Mac Dre, among others. Draped Up & Chipped Out, Vol. 2 was released shortly after Messy Marv's release from a year-long prison sentence on weapons charges (hence the name of the album series).

== Track listing ==
#	Title	length
1	Live from Rita (Intro)	2:12
2	Conversation Costs Money (featuring Magnolia Chop)	3:24
3	My Life Is a Movie (featuring Mac Dre)	3:42
4	Bagg Up (featuring Sean Paul)	4:00
5	Rep Yo Hood (performed by Mistah F.A.B., G-Stack & J. Stalin)	4:49
6	How Bad You Want It (performed by B-Legit)	3:21
7	Lil Daddy (featuring Juvenile & Skip)	3:42
8	What U Hollerin' (featuring Guce)	4:10
9	When the Plane Lands (performed by PSD)	3:21
10	Real Street N****s (featuring Guce)	3:36
11	Dope Boyz (performed by Nio the Gift, Dem Hoodstarz & Big Rich)	4:17
12	Body Rock (featuring Mike Jones)	3:25
13	Tongue Ring (performed by Jessica Rabbit)	2:29
14	How Bout That (performed by The Politician & V-White)	3:35
15	Say Luv (featuring J. Valentine)	3:47
16	Millionaire Gangsta	3:44
