= Cake & Ice Cream =

Studio album by Messy Marv
- Released: August 5, 2008
- Genre: Hip hop
- Length: 1:03:17
- Label: Siccness.net

Messy Marv chronology
Draped Up & Chipped Out, Vol. 2 (2007)	Cake & Ice Cream (2008)	Cake & Ice Cream 2 (2009)

Cake & Ice Cream is the 14th studio album by American rapper Messy Marv. It peaked at No. 49 on the R&B/Hip-Hop Albums chart and at No. 42 on the Heatseekers Albums chart. It is the first album of his Cake & Ice Cream trilogy and includes guest appearances from Gucci Mane, Yukmouth and Keak da Sneak, among others.

== Track listing ==
#	Title	length
1	Cake & Ice Cream	1:51
2	Just Fo the H*'s	4:01
3	Bussin Rubbabands	4:10
4	Ima Tell You Whuts Real	3:10
5	Neva Eva	4:34
6	To Whom It May Concern	4:52
7	Come Blow Wit Us (featuring Guce, Gucci Mane, Mitchy Slick, Keak da Sneak & Yukmouth)	5:52
8	Im Good (featuring Balance & Yukmouth)	3:49
9	All in the Club (featuring Jessica Rabbit)	3:23
10	100 Racks (featuring 100 Racks, Mitchy Slick & Tha Wrongkind)	3:49
11	Keisha Cole	0:46
12	All In Da Pimpin'	5:09
13	Jewelry Store (performed by Matt Blaque)	4:06
14	Like Me (performed by Jessica Rabbit)	3:12
15	U Get High	3:59
16	Don't Want to Lose You	3:37
17	For the Oners (performed by The Jacka & Turf Talk featuring Dubee & Mistah F.A.B.)	5:00
18	You N****s Aint Ready (featuring Ave Gang)	4:46
19	Why Me	3:11
