= Draped Up and Chipped Out, Vol. 4 =

Draped Up & Chipped Out, Vol. 4

Compilation album by Messy Marv
- Released: November 17, 2009
- Genre: Rap
- Length: 1:03:17
- Label: Clickclack Records

Messy Marv chronology
Prices on My Head: Thug Money on Ya Family, Vol. 1 (2009)	Draped Up & Chipped Out, Vol. 4 (2009)	Blow (2009)

Draped Up & Chipped Out, Vol. 4 is the seventh compilation album by American rapper Messy Marv. The album is the 4th and final album of his Draped Up & Chipped Out series. Although it never matched the success of the series' third volume, it did peak at #79 on the R&B/Hip-Hop Albums chart, #33 on the Heatseekers Albums chart, #1 on the Top Heatseekers West North Central chart, and #5 on the Top Heatseekers Pacific chart. It includes guest appearances from Tech N9ne, Keak da Sneak, Young Doe, Krizz Kaliko, The Jacka, Dru Down & Big Scoob, among others.

== Track listing ==
#	Title	length
1	Gain Green (featuring Krizz Kaliko, Tech N9ne & Big Scoob)	4:46
2	Oil (featuring Calico)	4:19
3	Married to the Game (featuring Rich the Factor & Skiem)	4:10
4	That's Real (featuring Keak da Sneak)	2:40
5	Shoot Em Down (featuring AP.9, Pretty Black & Lee Majors)	4:38
6	Around the World (featuring D.Z. & 40 Glocc)	4:35
7	Double XXL (Boy Big & K-Oz)	4:59
8	Tell Me (featuring Boy Big)	3:55
9	My Pimp (featuring Du Dirty)	3:58
10	Hook Up, Cook Up (featuring Dru Down)	2:55
11	Stories (featuring Boy Big, Young Gutta & K-Oz)	4:14
12	Lay U Down (featuring Slick Putt)	3:36
13	O's (featuring Rappin Twan)	3:52
14	Playin' My Part (featuring Young Doe)	4:55
15	Everything (featuring The Jacka)	3:07
16	Make It Like Crack (featuring Mitchy Slick)	5:29
17	Mr. Frank Lucas (featuring Papa Smurf)	3:49
18	Let's Get Down (featuring Young Bereta)	3:14
