= Nig-Latin =

Studio album by Mistah F.A.B.
- Released: October 1, 2002
- Recorded: 2002
- Genre: Hip hop; hyphy
- Length: 54:01
- Label: Straight Hits Entertainment

Mistah F.A.B. chronology
Nig-Latin (2002)	Son of a Pimp (2005)

Professional ratings
Review scores
Source	Rating
HipHopDX	4/5 stars

Nig-Latin is the debut studio album by American rapper Mistah F.A.B. from Oakland, California. It was released on October 1, 2002 via Straight Hits Entertainment.

== Track listing ==
No.	Title	Length
1.	"Born Up"	3:40
2.	"The Ghetto Lyfe" (featuring Lil Darryl)	3:49
3.	"Lava Boy" (featuring Why B.)	3:04
4.	"Thong B Free"	3:43
5.	"Causin You Trouble (Bubble)"	3:08
6.	"The Biz"	3:40
7.	"Damn Thang" (featuring Preach Martin)	4:26
8.	"He's Sicc"	3:28
9.	"Beaver Duck" (featuring Why B.)	3:28
10.	"Sports or Streets"	3:23
11.	"Cuzzo"	3:27
12.	"Nig-Latin"	3:20
13.	"Hula Hoop"	4:02
14.	"Hifey"	3:10
15.	"Worries"	4:13
Total length:		54:01
