= The Rock: Pressure Makes Diamonds =

Studio album by San Quinn
- Released: February 7, 2006
- Recorded: 2004–2006
- Genre: Hip hop
- Length: 1:13:42
- Label: Done Deal Entertainment; SMC Recordings
- Producer: Box Kev; Cozmo; Davey D; E-A-Ski; Jonathan "J. Moe" Moe; Left; Mac Pacino; Maxwell Smart; Mista Royce; Sean T; Steve Vicious; T.B.; Traxamillion

San Quinn chronology
I Give You My Word (2004)	The Rock: Pressure Makes Diamonds (2006)	Explosive Mode 2: Back In Business (2006)

Professional ratings
Review scores
Source	Rating
AllMusic	3/5 stars
RapReviews	7/10

The Rock: Pressure Makes Diamonds is the sixth studio album by American rapper San Quinn. It was released on February 7, 2006 through Done Deal Entertainment and SMC Recordings. Production was handled by Box Kev, Cozmo, Davey D, E-A-Ski, Jonathan "J. Moe" Moe, Left, Mac Pacino, Maxwell Smart, Mista Royce, Sean T, Steve Vicious, T.B. and Traxamillion. It features guest appearances from Allen Anthony, Big Rich, E-A-Ski, Dem Hoodstarz, Mike Marshall, Seff Tha Gaffla, Selau, Pierce and Ya Boy.

The album did not reach the US Billboard 200 albums chart, however, it made it to number 100 on the Top R&B/Hip-Hop Albums, number 20 on the Independent Albums, number 12 on the Heatseekers Albums and number 11 on the Tastemaker Albums. Its single, "Hell Yeah!", received considerable radio play and peaked at #19 on the Bubbling Under R&B/Hip-Hop Songs chart, with an accompanying music video was also directed for the song.

== Track listing ==
No.	Title	Producer(s)	Length
1.	"Frisco Stand Up (Checkmate 2)" (featuring Ya Boy)	Sean T	2:52
2.	"Hell Yeah!" (featuring E-A-Ski and Allen Anthony)	E-A-Ski	3:46
3.	"Planet Fillmoe" (featuring Seff Tha Gaffla)	Maxwell Smart	4:06
4.	"Get Low"	Mista Royce	3:14
5.	"Look What I've Done for Them"	Cozmo	4:54
6.	"Put My Mind to It"	Steve Vicious	4:32
7.	"Run the Block"	Left	3:41
8.	"Kick Yo' Ass"	Davey D	3:39
9.	"It's a Done Deal"	Traxamillion	3:08
10.	"Do That for Me"	Cozmo	4:22
11.	"So Young" (featuring Mike Marshall)	Sean T	4:02
12.	"From a Gangsta Like Me"	Cozmo	4:36
13.	"The Hunter" (featuring Ya Boy)	Steve Vicious	3:31
14.	"That's Beef" (featuring Big Rich)	T.B.	3:39
15.	"Holdin' Back These Years"	Davey D; Box Kev	3:44
16.	"I Got Goons" (featuring Dem Hoodstarz)	Sean T	3:39
17.	"Tell Me What the Price Is"	Mac Pacino	3:38
18.	"Way More Than They Can See" (featuring Selau)	Davey D; Jonathan "J. Moe" Moe	3:53
19.	"Pimps 'N Hustlas" (featuring Pierce)	Steve Vicious	4:46
Total length:			1:13:42

== Charts ==
Chart (2006)	Peak position
US Top R&B/Hip-Hop Albums (Billboard)	100
US Independent Albums (Billboard)	20
US Heatseekers Albums (Billboard)	12
US Top Tastemaker Albums (Billboard)	11
