= Millionaire Gangsta =

Compilation album by Messy Marv
- Released: June 22, 2010
- Genre: Rap
- Length: 1:03:17
- Label: Prominent House Records

Messy Marv chronology
| Blow (2009) | Millionaire Gangsta (2010) | Blow: Blocks and Boat Docks (2010) |

Millionaire Gangsta is the 9th compilation album by American rapper Messy Marv, released on June 22, 2010. It includes guest appearances from E-40, Yukmouth and T-Nutty, among other artists. Millionaire Gangsta peaked at #90 on the R&B/Hip-Hop Albums chart and #8 on the Top Heatseekers Pacific chart.

== Track listing ==
| # | Title | length |
|---|---|---|
| 1 | Messy Talkin' (Intro) | 1:52 |
| 2 | Cheese You Out | 4:17 |
| 3 | We Bears (featuring D.Z. & T-Nutty) | 4:35 |
| 4 | My Money (featuring D.Z.) | 3:28 |
| 5 | So Hard (performed by J. Stalin featuring Philthy Rich & Lil Blood) | 3:39 |
| 6 | Yayo (featuring Guce) | 3:51 |
| 7 | Hustle Till I Die (featuring Arrangatang Gang) | 3:08 |
| 8 | You Ain't Sayin' Nuttin (performed by Marcell) | 4:19 |
| 9 | I'm Big (featuring E-40 & Miss Cashley) | 4:03 |
| 10 | Know Bout Me (performed by Do It Movin') | 4:02 |
| 11 | Let You Have It (featuring Young Jun3) | 3:39 |
| 12 | Forget Me (featuring D.Z. & Guce) | 4:00 |
| 13 | In My Shoes (performed by Marcell) | 3:46 |
| 14 | Sixteen Gangstaz (performed by Guce featuring Squeak Wesson & Matt Blaque) | 3:08 |
| 15 | Money Mayne (featuring Yukmouth) | 3:20 |
| 16 | Doin My Thang (performed by Arrangatang Gang featuring Jujizzle & Arkaydion) | 4:18 |
| 17 | Don't F**k With the Help (featuring Killa Keise & Do It Movin) | 3:33 |
| 18 | Happy Ending (performed by Balance) | 4:03 |
| 19 | Outro (performed by various artists) | 1:34 |
