= Blow (Messy Marv and Berner album) =

Studio album by Messy Marv and Berner
- Released: December 15, 2009
- Genre: Gangsta rap
- Length: 62:54
- Label: SMC Recordings
- Producer: Maxwell Smart; Sean T; Cozmo; CyFyre; Gennessee; Goblin; Golden I-95; Stinj-E

Messy Marv and Berner chronology
Draped Up and Chipped Out, Vol. 4 (2009)	Blow (2009)	Millionaire Gangsta (2010)

Blow is collaboration album between American rappers Messy Marv and Berner. The album includes guest appearances from B-Legit, Yukmouth and C-Bo. Blow peaked at #87 on the R&B/Hip-Hop Albums chart, #31 on the Heatseekers Albums chart, and #6 on the Top Heatseekers West North Central chart.

== Track listing ==
#	Title	length
1	Intro	3:13
2	They Talkin' (featuring Lee Majors)	4:08
3	The Format (featuring B-Legit & Shoboat)	4:03
4	Sky's tha Limit (featuring C-Bo, Maserati Rick & Killa Tay)	3:59
5	Doin' Time (featuring Goldtoes & Husalah)	4:33
6	Won't Stop (featuring Fam Syrk & Killa Tay)	4:02
7	Ghetto America (featuring J. Stalin)	3:34
8	Hit 'Em (featuring Shoboat)	3:18
9	Ungreatful (featuring Ampichino & Young Boss)	3:49
10	The Re-Up (featuring Fed-X)	4:15
11	Skit	0:57
12	Dealer (featuring City Shine Hustle Boys)	3:36
13	Good for Nothing (featuring Fed-X)	4:32
14	So Fly (featuring Dubb 20)	4:06
15	Around tha Way (performed by Messy Marv featuring Equipto & Shag Nasty)	3:54
16	Pie (performed by Berner featuring Young Boss, Lurchi & Yukmouth)	4:02
17	Outro	2:53
