= Different Slanguages =

Studio album by Messy Marv
- Released: October 16, 2004
- Genre: Gangsta rap West Coast hip hop Hyphy
- Label: Cheddah Recordz

Messy Marv chronology
DisoBAYish (2004)	Different Slanguages (2004)	The Block Files (2004)

Different Slanguages is the sixth album by rapper Messy Marv a.k.a. MessCalen.

== Track listing ==
1. Intro
2. Top of the World
3. Bitch Move
4. Different Slanguages
5. Cuz We Want to (featuring JT The Bigga Figga)
6. Black Jesus (featuring Mad Lung)
7. It's On (featuring Keak Da Sneak)
8. Skit
9. Pop That (featuring Billy Cook)
10. Stuntin
11. Discobayish
12. Ko.Alition (featuring Lucci Seigal)
13. Kill That Bitch
14. It's Krazy (featuring Lucci Seigal)
