= Blow: Blocks and Boat Docks =

Studio album by Messy Marv and Berner
- Released: August 17, 2010
- Genre: Hip hop
- Length: 1:12:40
- Label: Bern One
- Producer: Sean T, Maxwell Smart, Cozmo, Pak Slap, D. Wells, Gennessee

Messy Marv and Berner chronology
Millionaire Gangsta (2010)	Blow: Blocks and Boat Docks (2010)	Kontraband (2011)

Blow: Blocks and Boat Docks is collaboration album between American rappers Messy Marv and Berner, the second album of their Blow series. The album features guest appearances from Brisco, Yukmouth, B-Legit, The Jacka, J. Stalin and San Quinn, among others.

It peaked at #48 on the R&B/Hip-Hop Albums chart, #16 on the Heatseekers Albums chart and #2 on the Top Heatseekers pacific chart. It is one of Messy Marv's most successful albums of his career, while Blow: Blocks and Boat Docks is the most successful for Berner.

A music video has been filmed for the song "Well Connected".

== Track listing ==
#	Title	length
1	Well Connected (performed by Berner)	3:52
2	Dolla's (featuring Shoboat)	4:07
3	Blow (featuring Joe Blow)	4:03
4	Picture Me (featuring Brisco & Cozmo)	5:20
5	Blow Money (featuring Freeze & Killa Keise)	4:21
6	Warrior (featuring Ampichino & San Quinn)	4:49
7	Heard About Me (featuring B-Legit, Rocka Boy & The Jacka)	5:27
8	I Get It (featuring Lee Majors & Yukmouth)	4:20
9	City S**t (featuring Buchanan, Killa Keise, Shag Nasty & Baldhead Rick)	5:08
10	Whip Cream (featuring Freeze & Smiggz)	4:47
11	High Speed (featuring Ampichino)	4:11
12	Everything Is Wrong (featuring Equipto)	4:33
13	How I Ride (featuring Matt Blaque & San Quinn)	5:03
14	Gold Club (featuring Goldtoes & J. Stalin)	4:37
15	Street Figures (featuring Freeze & Maserati Rick)	4:11
16	Vision (featuring J. Stalin)	3:51
