= Son of a Pimp Part 2 =

Studio album by Mistah F.A.B.
- Released: May 27, 2016
- Genre: Hip hop
- Length: 1:15:33
- Label: EMPIRE
- Producer: Mistah F.A.B. (exec.); Chinky P; Ekzakt; Elusive Orkestra; Erk Tha Jerk; Iamsu!; Jake One; Juneonnabeat; Lev Berlak; P-Lo; Pete Rock; Sean T; S.E. Trill; Tha Bizness; The Mekanix

Mistah F.A.B. chronology
Da Yellow Bus Rydah (2012)	Son of a Pimp Part 2 (2016)	Thug Tears (2018)

Professional ratings
Review scores
Source	Rating
HipHopDX	3.9/5 stars

Son of a Pimp Part 2 is the fifth studio album by American rapper Mistah F.A.B. from Oakland, California. It was released on May 27, 2016, via Faeva Afta/EMPIRE. Production was handled by several record producers, including Iamsu!, Jake One, Pete Rock, P-Lo, Sean T, and Tha Bizness among others. It also features guest appearances by the likes of 2 Chainz, B.o.B, Bobby V, Bun B, Carl Thomas, Crooked I, Devin the Dude, E-40, Fashawn, G-Eazy, J. Stalin, Jadakiss, Keak da Sneak, Kendrick Lamar, Keyshia Cole, Kobe, Lil' Boosie, Lupe Fiasco, Curren$y, Paul Wall, Raekwon, Schoolboy Q, Slim Thug, Snoop Dogg, Tech N9NE, The Jacka, Too $hort, and Z-Ro among others. The album peaked at number 24 on the US Billboard Top R&B/Hip-Hop Albums, number 16 on the Top Rap Albums, number 22 on the Independent Albums, number 3 on the Heatseekers Albums. This album is a follow-up to the rapper's 2005 album Son of a Pimp.

== Track listing ==
No.	Title	Producer(s)	Length
1.	"Liberty Forever" (Intro)		0:19
2.	"Son of a Pimp" (featuring CMT)	The Mekanix	3:01
3.	"Not in Love Anymore" (featuring Netta B)	Tha Bizness	3:51
4.	"Pretty Girls" (featuring Raekwon, G-Eazy & Carl Thomas)	Chinky P	3:59
5.	"Up Until Then" (featuring Lil' Boosie & Iamsu!)	Iamsu!	3:36
6.	"Survive" (featuring Kendrick Lamar, Crooked I & Kobe Honeycutt)	Tha Bizness	3:50
7.	"All Around the World" (featuring Keyshia Cole & Silk-E)	The Mekanix	3:44
8.	"What Yo Hood Like" (featuring Jadakiss)	Pete Rock	3:05
9.	"Backseat" (featuring Tech N9NE & B.o.B)	Chinky P	3:19
10.	"Finna Do" (featuring Iamsu! & Idaho J Doe)	Juneonnabeat	4:05
11.	"Black Hollywood" (featuring Too $hort, Snoop Dogg & Bobby V)	Tha Bizness	3:41
12.	"Still Feelin' It"	Sean T	3:23
13.	"IDKW2D" (featuring 2 Chainz)	Ekzakt	3:22
14.	"Memory Lane" (featuring Dyson)	Elusive Orkestra	3:41
15.	"On All Mommaz" (featuring Keak da Sneak & E-40)	P-Lo	3:07
16.	"The Chill" (featuring ScHoolboy Q & Curren$y)	Elusive Orkestra	4:09
17.	"Yes Indeed" (featuring Fashawn & Lupe Fiasco)	Jake One	3:42
18.	"Commin Down" (featuring Bun B, Slim Thug, Paul Wall & Z-Ro)	S.E. Trill	5:03
19.	"Disrespectful" (featuring Too $hort, Devin The Dude & Erk Tha Jerk)	Erk Tha Jerk	4:10
20.	"Brother to Brother" (featuring Dyson)		5:11
21.	"Written in Blood" (featuring J. Stalin & The Jacka)	Lev Berlak	3:15
Total length:			1:15:33

== Charts ==
Chart (2016)	Peak position
US Top R&B/Hip-Hop Albums (Billboard)	24
US Top Rap Albums (Billboard)	16
US Independent Albums (Billboard)	22
US Heatseekers Albums (Billboard)	3
