= I Give You My Word =

Studio album by San Quinn
- Released: December 14, 2004
- Recorded: 2003–2004
- Genre: Hip hop
- Length: 1:17:31
- Labels: Done Deal Entertainment; Rider Entertainment
- Producers: Cozmo; Icey Mike Beats; One Drop Scott; Tone Capone

San Quinn chronology
| The Mighty Quinn (2001) | I Give You My Word (2004) | The Rock: Pressure Makes Diamonds (2006) |

I Give You My Word is the fifth solo studio album by American rapper San Quinn. It was released on December 14, 2004 through Done Deal Entertainment and Rider Entertainment.The album's Production was handled by Tone Capone, One Drop Scott, Cozmo and Icey Mike Beats. It features guest appearances from Big Rich, C-Bo, E-40, James "Stomp Down" Bailey, Juvenile, Keak da Sneak, Killa Tay, Phats Bossi and Willy Hen.

While the album did not reach the US Billboard 200 albums chart, it made it to number 61 on the Top R&B/Hip-Hop Albums, number 23 on the Independent Albums and number 27 on the Heatseekers Albums.

== Track listing ==
| No. | Title | Producer(s) | Length |
|---|---|---|---|
| 1. | "Northern California" | Cozmo | 5:17 |
| 2. | "Going All Out" | One Drop Scott | 3:57 |
| 3. | "Hardway" (featuring E-40) | Tone Capone | 3:31 |
| 4. | "Butterfly (By My Side)" | Tone Capone | 4:17 |
| 5. | "Pop Off" (featuring Keak da Sneak and Juvenile) | Tone Capone | 4:19 |
| 6. | "Mask Cracked" | Tone Capone | 3:58 |
| 7. | "Lavishness" | Tone Capone | 3:50 |
| 8. | "Deep End" (featuring Big Rich) | One Drop Scott | 4:23 |
| 9. | "Flow Down" (featuring James "Stomp Down" Bailey) | Tone Capone | 4:24 |
| 10. | "High Light" | Tone Capone | 4:15 |
| 11. | "Real Playaz" (featuring Willy Hen) | Tone Capone | 4:23 |
| 12. | "Sav Boyz" (featuring C-Bo and Killa Tay) | Tone Capone | 4:17 |
| 13. | "What You Made Me Do" | Icy Mike Beats | 4:10 |
| 14. | "Daddy Song" | Tone Capone | 4:14 |
| 15. | "Thugs" | Tone Capone | 4:23 |
| 16. | "Gangsta Touch" (featuring Phats Bossilini) | Tone Capone | 4:46 |
| 17. | "Smiling Faces" | One Drop Scott | 5:01 |
| 18. | "Greatness (Gangsta Prayer)" | | 4:06 |
| Total length: | | | 1:17:31 |

== Charts ==
| Chart (2004) | Peak position |
|---|---|
| US Top R&B/Hip-Hop Albums (Billboard) | 61 |
| US Independent Albums (Billboard) | 23 |
| US Heatseekers Albums (Billboard) | 27 |
