= Roach Gigz =

American music artist

- Also known as: Roachy Balboa
- Born: Orlando Rinaldi Campbell
- Origin: San Francisco, California, U.S.
- Genres: Hip hop, hyphy
- Occupation: Rapper
- Labels: Goomba Records, Thizz City
- Website: http://roachgigz.com/

Roach Gigz or Roach, is an American rapper and hyphy hip hop artist from the San Francisco Bay Area. Gigz released his first independent album in 2012, entitled Bugged Out. He runs his own label, Goomba Records.

== Career ==
=== Early career ===
While a student at Leadership High School, Roach Gigz was involved with Youth Radio, an East Bay Area nonprofit youth organization, and then started to develop an interest in rapping. In 2006, Gigz started rapping in his closet with a microphone, and started to create his own hip hop songs, which were liked by his peers. He first gained fame locally after forming a hip hop duo called Bitch I Go (B.I.G.) with rapper Lil 4Tay. Roach Gigz was given the nickname due to his resemblance to a character from the movie Next Friday named Roach, and "gigz" due to his frequent performance at gigs around Northern California.

=== 2010–present ===
In May 2010, Gigz released his first major mixtape entitled Roachy Balboa, which received much airplay on Bay Area radio station 106.1 KMEL. Pitchfork music critic David Drake described the mixtape as "one of the most energetically fun rap records released this year." Gigz was selected to be KMEL's Top 10 Freshman Rappers of the Bay Area. In November 2010, he released his single "Can I Rap". A music video for the song was uploaded onto YouTube and has received over one million views.

Mixtape Roachy Balboa 2 was released in January 2011, and the mixtape Bitch, I'm a Player was released in August 2011. Gigz was featured on the track "Golden State" with Bay Area rappers Bobby Brackins and Iamsu!, which was released in November 2011.

Roach Gigz's first independent album, Bugged Out, was released on iTunes on September 4, 2012. The album features fourteen tracks, and a digital booklet.

== Discography ==
=== Studio albums ===
- 2012 Bugged Out
- 2015 The Float

=== EPs ===
- 2010 Roach Gigz & Lil 4 Tay – From Another
- 2012 Bitch I'm A Player

=== Mixtapes ===
- 2008 Bitch I Go Vol. 1
- 2009 Buckets And Booty Calls
- 2010 Roachy Balboa
- 2011 Roachy Balboa – Round 2
- 2012 Roach Gigz & Iamsu – Heartbreak Goomba
- 2012 Hot Air Balloons & Cinnamon Sticks
- 2013 Roachy Balboa – Round 3
- 2015 Roachy Balboa – Round 4

== Influences ==
Gigz cites rappers 2Pac and Mac Dre as his musical influences, who are both artists that grew up in the San Francisco Bay Area. He also states Lil Wayne, Andre 3000, and Eminem to be among his hip hop artist influences. He claimed that the first rap song that he heard that got him interested in wanting to rap was "Summertime in the LBC" by The Dove Shack, a Long Beach hip hop group. Gigz first heard of it in elementary school and described the fact that it was a "California song" made him feel connected to it.
