= From Seed to Sale =

From Seed to $ale

Studio album by Berner
- Released: October 27, 2022
- Genre: Hip hop
- Length: 101:51
- Labels: Bern One Entertainment; Empire
- Producer: Berner

Berner chronology
Gotti (2021)	From Seed to $ale (2022)

Professional ratings
Review scores
Source	Rating
AllMusic	3/5 stars

From Seed to $ale is a solo album by American rapper Berner. It was released on October 27, 2022, via Bern One Entertainment/Empire. It features guest appearances from Cozmo, Seddy Hendrinx, CJ Washington, Hollywood, JMSN, Mozzy, The Jacka and Wiz Khalifa. The album peaked at number 20 on the Billboard 200.

== Track listing ==
From Seed to Sale track listing
No.	Title	Length
1.	"Bohdi (Intro)"	0:45
2.	"Still Holdin"	3:19
3.	"Low Temp"	3:03
4.	"Cure"	3:38
5.	"Back Around" (featuring Cozmo and CJ Washington)	3:44
6.	"Conglomerate" (featuring Mozzy and Cozmo)	3:25
7.	"Juice"	3:44
8.	"Black Cars & Heavy Metal"	3:54
9.	"Cold Champagne for Lunch"	2:37
10.	"Spin the Block" (featuring Wiz Khalifa)	3:50
11.	"Mail"	3:51
12.	"Coach"	3:37
13.	"No More Deals" (featuring Cozmo)	3:32
14.	"If It's Up" (featuring Seddy Hendrinx)	3:02
15.	"Cut Throat"	4:14
16.	"Doubled It"	4:32
17.	"Dream"	3:43
18.	"Slide"	2:54
19.	"About Us"	3:45
20.	"Like This" (featuring Hollywood)	2:33
21.	"Elon"	2:53
22.	"Whole New Lens"	2:55
23.	"Top"	2:47
24.	"Wheel"	3:06
25.	"This Car"	4:10
26.	"Pain" (featuring The Jacka and Seddy Hendrinx)	4:05
27.	"Gut"	3:38
28.	"No Nightmares"	3:38
29.	"Hidden Messages" (featuring JMSN)	4:58
30.	"Bohdi (Outro)"	1:59
Total length:		101:51

== Charts ==
Chart performance for From Seed to Sale
Chart (2022)	Peak position
US Billboard 200	20
US Independent Albums (Billboard)	2
US Top R&B/Hip-Hop Albums (Billboard)	12
