= No Safety =

Studio album by Tiny Doo
- Released: 2014
- Genre: Hip hop

No Safety is an American rap album by Tiny Doo.

== Controversy ==
No Safety became the subject of controversy after authorities in San Diego charged Doo with promoting violence in the album's lyrics in 2014.
