= Bandannas, Tattoos & Tongue Rings =

Studio album by Messy Marv
- Released: January 25, 2005
- Recorded: 2004
- Genre: West Coast hip hop, hyphy
- Label: Scalen Muzik Inc.
- Producer: Marvin "Messy Marv" Watson Jr., Cozmo, Droop-E, Sean T, The Kream Team, Tron Treez

Messy Marv chronology
The Still Explosive Project (2004)	Bandannas, Tattoos & Tongue Rings (2005)	Scrapers, Stunnas & White Tees (2005)

Bandannas, Tattoos & Tongue Rings is a studio album released by rapper Messy Marv on January 25, 2005. Guest appearances on the album include Lil' Flip (credited as Clover Geez), Suga Free, Rich The Factor, Dead Prez, Guce, E-40 & Yukmouth. It peaked at number 80 on the Billboard Top R&B/Hip-Hop Albums.

== Track listing ==
1. "The Toast" 1:52
2. "2 To The Neck" 3:17
3. "I'm Too Thowed" 4:29
4. "Tycoonin'" 3:26
5. "The Ice Down" (Skit) 1:22
6. "Still Ballin'" (featuring Clover Geez) (Lil' Flip & Big Shasta) 4:47
7. "Momma" 4:52
8. "Sexy Thang" (featuring Suga Free) 4:28
9. "Eat The Poot" (Skit) 1:06
10. "That Thurr" (featuring Rich The Factor) 4:13
11. "Wanna B Yours" 3:29
12. "U Ain't The Only 1" (featuring Dead Prez) 4:50
13. "Let It B Known" (featuring Guce) 4:22
14. "Don't You Say That" 3:07
15. "Mac Dre & The Mac" (Tribute) 3:45
16. "Neva B Right" (featuring E-40 and Yukmouth) 4:03
17. "Get On My Hype" 3:25
