= Cake & Ice Cream 2 =

Studio album by Messy Marv
- Released: March 10, 2009
- Genre: Rap
- Length: 1:18:01
- Label: Siccness.net
- Producer: Messy Marv

Messy Marv chronology
Cake & Ice Cream (2008)	Cake & Ice Cream 2 (2009)	Blow (2009)

Cake & Ice Cream 2 is the 15th studio album by American rapper Messy Marv. The 2nd album of his Cake & Ice Cream trilogy, it peaked at #39 on the R&B/Hip-Hop Albums chart, #25 on the Heatseekers Albums chart, and at #12 on the Rap Albums chart. It is one of the most successful albums of his career. Cake & Ice Cream 2 includes guest appearances from E-40 and The Jacka, among others, and also performances by Gucci Mane, Mistah F.A.B., Yukmouth & Turf Talk. As of April 2009, it had sold 5,222 copies in the U.S.

"Talk Baseball" and "Killa" are both diss tracks at cousin/rapper San Quinn, while Quinn himself appears on Cake & Ice Cream 2 and disses Messy Marv in a song called "Fence Hopper".

According to Allmusic, "The Fillmore District’s own Messy Marv never rests, as he gives hungry fans another taste of his unique West Coast flavor on the mixtape release Cake & Ice Cream 2. The album documents the beef between Marv and fellow Bay Area representative San Quinn with each rapper throwing shots on solo diss tracks (San Quinn labels Marv a “Fence Hopper” and Marv gets personal on “Killa”). A handful of respected northern Cali artists also put in guest appearances."

== Track listing ==
#	Title	length
1	Cake and Ice Cream, V. II	3:36
2	Talk Baseball (San Quinn Diss!!)	2:45
3	Fence Hopper (Messy Marv Diss!!) [performed by San Quinn]	3:30
4	Killa (San Quinn Diss!!)	4:11
5	Enemy	3:25
6	Like Me	3:49
7	Down for My Block (performed by Mistah F.A.B. & Turf Talk featuring E-40)	4:22
8	Money Bags Shawty (performed by Gucci Mane)	4:31
9	U Heezy	3:53
10	U Wit Me	3:11
11	Let Me Pimp or Let Me Die (performed by Suga Free)	3:27
12	No Love (performed by Matt Blaque)	3:28
13	Menage	3:45
14	Fu#$n Wit It (performed by Yukmouth featuring Smigg Dirtee, Gonzoe, I-Rocc & The Jacka)	4:42
15	Trap	4:04
16	Angel	4:35
17	Underneath	3:50
18	Candy	4:51
19	Imma Hustla (featuring The Jacka)	4:42
20	Girl (performed by Jessica Rabbit)	3:24
