= Explosive Mode =

Studio album by Messy Marv, San Quinn
- Released: June 30, 1998
- Genre: West Coast hip hop
- Length: 1:13:39
- Label: Presidential Records
- Producers: Sean T, Mike Mosely, Tone Capone, Icey Mike Beats, D'wayne Wiggins, DJ Daryl

Messy Marv, San Quinn chronology
Explosive Mode (1998)	Explosive Mode 2: Back In Business (2006)

Explosive Mode is a studio album by San Quinn and Messy Marv. It is the first installment in the three-album series, which did well through independent sales and is considered a Bay Area–classic in the late 1990s.

== Reception ==
Journalist Pendarvis Harshaw described Explosive Mode as a "certified hood classic". Critic Steve Juon calls the album a "West coast classic", writing that "Messy Marv and San Quinn are unapologetically gangsterish, pimperish, misogynistic and straight twisted."

== Track listing ==
#	Track	Featured Guest(s)	Producer(s)	Length
01.	"Home"	Dee-Dee	Mike Mosely	5:28
02.	"Pop Yo Colla"	E-40, Mixture	C-Funk	5:31
03.	"Discourteous"		DJ Daryl	3:53
04.	"Ready 4 War"		Tone Capone	5:27
05.	"Golden State"	Rappin' 4-Tay, Sky Skers	Nick Peace	3:51
06.	"Mobb Shit'"	Marvaless	Sean T, G-Man Stan	4:08
07.	"Explosive Mode"	Bossman	Icey Mike Beats	4:10
08.	"Stop It"	Bill Bathgate	DJ Daryl	4:25
09.	"Bay Luv"	Black N Brown, Don P, Baldhead Rick	Reg & Race	3:23
10.	"Presidential"	The Network	Mike Mosely, Femi	4:38
11.	"Hoodlyfe"	Celly Cel	Mike Mosely, Femi	4:54
12.	"Want Me to Stay"	D'wayne Wiggins	Dwayne Wiggins	5:04
13.	"Watch Out"	D-Mozer, Willie Hen, Lyesha	DJ Darryl	4:21
14.	"Money Now"	Sky Skers	Tone Capone	4:45
15.	"Boss Hogs"	D-Fresh	DJ Daryl	3:43
16.	"Takin' Inventory"	Rich the Factor, Young Fee	Rick The Factor	4:02
