= Max Perry =

- Born: June 23, 1984 (age 42)
- Origin: Brooklyn, New York, United States
- Genres: Hip hop, R&B, Pop
- Occupations: Record producer, songwriter, rapper, singer
- Instruments: synthesizer, keyboards, turntables, drum machine, sampler
- Years active: 2001–present
- Labels: EMI, Slip-N-Slide, Koch, Diplomat, SMC, Thizz, E1 Music

Max Perry (born June 23, 1984), primarily known by his stage name Maxwell Smart is a record producer, born in New York City and raised in Brooklyn, New York. He has worked with artists including Wiz Khalifa, Trina, and Snoop Dogg.

== History ==
Max Perry was born in New York. His father, Fredro Perry, is a drummer, songwriter, producer, and independent label owner, who has toured with his band, The Brooklyn Cowboys. His uncle, Richard Perry, is a record producer who has worked with artists including Carly Simon, Ringo Starr, Ray Charles, and Barbra Streisand.

Max Perry has done cowriting with his brother and partner, Gennessee, who has worked with artists such as Mac Dre, One Block Radius, Too Short, Hell Rell, Paul Wall, AZ, and Chino XL. Perry has produced for artists from his hometown of New York such as Jim Jones (rapper), Prodigy (rapper), AZ, Sheek Louch, TruLife, Hell Rell, Max B, 40 Cal, and Paul Cain. He often traveled to California to work with his brother and musical partner Gennessee. This collaboration led to working with artists like Berner (rapper), Mistah F.A.B., San Quinn, Messy Marv, Slim The Mobster, The Outlawz, Killa Tay, BLegit & Matt Blaque.

Max Perry produced 3 tracks for the American Gangster: Mac Dre and the Romper Room Gang episode, which aired on BET in January 2009. In 2010 Max gained his first #1 Album on Billboard producing for Trina & Lyfe Jennings on Trina's album “Amazin”.

In 2011, Perry became Head Engineer at Wash House Studios in Haleiwa, HI producing, mixing and recording for Reggae artists such as Morgan Heritage, SOJA, Junior Reid, Gappy Ranks, Fiji & Jboog, whose Perry produced single “Smokin Bomb Bud” reached #1 on the iTunes Reggae Charts. Perry is currently working with J Boog, Snoop Dogg, Berner, Wiz Khalifa, Twista, Big K.R.I.T & Vital Deshawn.

== Chart Awards ==
Hell Rell – For the Hell of It

Chart	Position
Billboard 200	# 55
R&B/Hip-Hop Albums	# 10
Independent Albums	# 5
Rap Albums	# 5

Mistah F.A.B. – Da Baydestrian

Chart	Position
Billboard 200	# 177
R&B/Hip-Hop Albums	# 47
Heatseekers Albums	# 7
Independent Albums	# 20
Rap Albums	# 21

San Quinn – The Rock: Pressure Makes Diamonds

Chart	Position
R&B/Hip-Hop Albums	# 100
Heatseekers Albums	# 12
Independent Albums	# 20

AZ – Legendary

Chart	Position
R&B/Hip-Hop Albums	# 54
Rap Albums	# 24

Sheek Louch – Life On D-Block

Chart	Position
Billboard 200	# 122
R&B/Hip-Hop Albums	# 26
Independent Albums	# 17
Rap Albums	# 13

Messy Marv and Berner – Blow

Chart	Position
Heatseekers Albums	# 31

Messy Marv and Berner – Blow 2: Blocks and Boat Docks

Chart	Position
R&B Albums	# 48
Heatseekers Albums	# 16

Trina – Amazin'

Chart	Position
Billboard 200	# 13
R&B/Hip-Hop Albums	# 4
Independent Albums	# 1
Rap Albums	# 2

== Discography ==
- 2006 Global – Yadadamean [Global Warning]
- 2006 San Quinn – Planet Fillmoe – The Rock: Pressure Makes Diamonds
- 2007 Mistah F.A.B. – Jamonie Robinson – Da Baydestrian
- 2007 Cozmo – Drinks Up feat. San Quinn, Goldie [The Streets Are Mine]
- 2007 Berner – We Got It feat Sean Paul of The Youngbloodz & San Quinn [Dirty Sneakers... Plenty Ways To Get It]
- 2007 Paul Cain – Runnin The City [The Wrath Of Cain]
- 2007 San Quinn – Get Lit Wit Us [The Color Of Money]
- 2007 San Quinn – You Need It We Got It [The Color Of Money]
- 2007 Hell Rell – Always Wanted To Be A Gangster For the Hell of It
- 2007 Hell Rell & 40 Cal. – Warm It Up [Year of the Gun]
- 2008 Prodigy – Superstars [H.N.I.C. 2: Advance]
- 2009 Jody Breeze – Too Much
- 2009 AZ – Boy Meets Girl – Legendary
- 2009 Sheek Louch – In The Rain Life on D-Block
- 2009 Hell Rell – Young, Black & Strapped [Get in Line Or Get Lined Up]
- 2010 Trina – Make Way feat. Lyfe Jennings – Amazin'
- 2010 One Block Radius – Gravity
- 2010 Messy Marv & Berner – The Dealer [Blow]
- 2010 Messy Marv & Berner – Blow feat Joe Blow [Blow 2]
- 2010 Messy Marv & Berner – Blow Money feat Killa Keise & Freeze [Blow 2]
- 2010 Messy Marv & Berner – Warrior feat San Quinn & Ampichino [Blow 2])
- 2010 Messy Marv & Berner – I Get It feat Yukmouth & Lee Majors [Blow 2]
- 2010 Messy Marv & Berner – V4 feat Freeze & Maserati Rick [Blow 2]
- 2010 Outlawz – Killuminati 2K10 feat. Mainavent
- 2010 Outlawz – Gotta Get It feat. Yung LA
- 2010 Outlawz – Better Than Ever (Killuminati 2K10)
- 2011 Mistah F.A.B. – Hip Hop – [I Found My Backpack]
- 2011 Berner – Carry On feat San Quinn & Cozmo [The White Album]
- 2011 Q Da Kid – Look at Me Now feat Avery Storm
- 2011 Outlawz – Pushin On feat. Scarface & Lloyd (Perfect Timing)
- 2011 Matt Blaque – Alcohol Insane feat. Clyde Carson
- 2011 Mainey Vent – Powered Up (Hogan)
- 2012 J-Boog & Fiji – Smokin Bomb Bud
- 2013 J Boog – Diamond in the Back [My Diamond Life Mixtape]
- 2013 B-Legit – Best Friend feat J Boog [My Diamond Life Mixtape]
- 2013 Mac Dre – Mami Come feat J Boog [My Diamond Life Mixtape]
- 2013 Lion Fiyah – Salute The Crown feat Peetah Morgan [My Diamond Life Mixtape]
- 2013 J Boog – Coldest Zone Maxwell Smart Remix [My Diamond Life Mixtape]
- 2013 Berner – Ready 2 Die feat Big K.R.I.T. & Z-Ro [Drugstore Cowboy]
- 2013 Philthy Rich – Get Ya Money feat Fabolous & Smuggla [N.E.R.N.L. 2]
- 2014 Berner – All in a Day feat YG, Young Thug & Vital
- 2014 Wiz Khalifa – The Dispensary feat Chevy Woods & Berner
- 2014 J-Stalin – Meth [Dirty Money]
- 2014 B-Real & Berner – Faded feat Snoop Dogg & Vital [Prohibition]
- 2014 B-Real & Berner – 1 Hit feat Devin The Dude [Prohibition]
- 2014 B-Real & Berner – Xanax & Patron feat Demrick [Prohibition]
- 2014 Twista – Burnin feat Wiz Khalifa & Berner [Dark Horse]
- 2014 Berner – Foreign feat Sage The Gemini, Keak Da Sneak & Snow Tha Product
- 2014 Drew Deezy – Gets No Better feat Common Kings [Poly Tape 2]
- 2014 Gappy Ranks – Carpenter Maxwell Smart Remix [Carpenter (The Remixes)]
- 2015 Berner – 3 Mill [20 Lights]
- 2015 Berner – Dump feat Mac Dre [20 Lights]
- 2015 Berner – Pass Me The Green feat Migos [20 Lights]
- 2015 Berner – Breathe/Dreaming feat Ampichino [20 Lights]
- 2015 Berner – Still I Ride [The Jacka Tribute]
- 2015 Lion Fiyah – Feel Like A Kid Agin [Salute The Crown]
- 2015 Lion Fiyah – Salute The Crown feat Peetah Morgan [Salute The Crown]
- 2015 Lion Fiyah – Love Love feat J Boog [Salute The Crown]
- 2015 Lion Fiyah – Still Mighty [Salute The Crown]
- 2015 Lion Fiyah – Love of a Lifetime [Salute The Crown]
- 2015 B-Legit – Best Friend feat J Boog [What We Been Doin]
- 2015 B-Real & Berner – Kings [Prohibition Part 2]
- 2015 B-Real & Berner – Mob feat B-Legit [Prohibition Part 2]
- 2015 B-Real & Berner – Go feat Vital [Prohibition Part 2]
- 2015 Jay Lozoya – Dangerous feat Iamsu & Zoey Dollaz
- 2015 Kelissa – Keep My Head Up [Smart Riddim]
- 2015 Marla Brown – Better Days [Smart Riddim]
- 2015 Gappy Ranks – Barefoot feat Torch [Smart Riddim]
- 2015 King Mas – Reflection [Smart Riddim]
- 2015 Jah Bami – What Can You Do [Smart Riddim]
- 2015 Forelock & Awawak – Global Backfire [Smart Riddim]
- 2015 Norris Man – It Dread [Smart Riddim]
- 2015 Cam'Ron & Berner – Not Yours feat Sen City [Contraband]
- 2015 Cam'Ron & Berner – Get More feat Devin The Dude [Contraband]
- 2015 Cam'Ron & Berner – Ride feat Twista & Sen City [Contraband]
- 2015 Marteen – I Wanna
- 2016 B-Real & Berner – Levitate feat Quez [Prohibition Part 3]
- 2016 B-Real & Berner – Marijuana feat B-Legit & Demrick [Prohibition Part 3]
- 2016 B-Real & Berner – On & On [Prohibition Part 3]
- 2016 Smoke DZA & Green R Fieldz – The One
- 2016 J Boog – Brighter Days [Rose Petals]
- 2016 J Boog – No Pressure feat Snoop Dogg [Rose Petals]
- 2016 Berner – Seal feat Wiz Khalifa & K Camp [Hempire]
- 2016 Berner – Telephone [Hempire]
- 2016 Berner – All We Do feat Wiz Khalifa & Juicy J [Hempire]
- 2016 J Boog – Brighter Days [Wash House Ting]
- 2016 Cozmo – Seen It All B4 (Intro) [Beyond Forever]
- 2016 Cozmo – What Dreams Are Made Of feat Wiz Khalifa & AVRY [Beyond Forever]
- 2016 Cozmo – No Tomorrow feat Cyhi the Prynce [Beyond Forever]
- 2016 Cozmo – Exhale feat Berner [Beyond Forever]
- 2016 Cozmo – 4U feat Torica [Beyond Forever]
- 2016 Berner – Niice feat Quavo & Paul Wall [Packs]
- 2016 Berner – Chilled feat Wiz Khalifa [Packs]
- 2016 Berner – Twenty One feat Smiggz [Packs]
- 2017 Mistah F.A.B. – Champagne & Cookies – [4506]
- 2017 Berner – Last Night feat B-Real & Cozmo [Sleepwalkin]
- 2017 Berner – Dusse feat Vital [Sleepwalkin]
- 2017 Berner – Crazy [Sleepwalkin]
- 2017 Flipp Dinero – I Do [The Guala Way]
- 2017 Mula Gang – Twin Giants
- 2017 Tree Thomas – Kingrove EP
- 2017 Styles P & Berner – Turkey Bag feat B-Real [Vibes]
- 2017 Styles P & Berner – Blue [Vibes]
- 2017 Styles P & Berner – Picture feat Dave East & Skimask [Vibes]
- 2017 Styles P & Berner – Rotate feat B-Real & Cozmo [Vibes]
- 2017 Styles P & Berner – Top Floor feat Cozmo [Vibes]
- 2017 Styles P & Berner – Free [Vibes]
- 2017 Styles P & Berner – Keep Smokin feat Wiz Khalifa [Vibes]
- 2017 Philthy Rich – Hella Dope feat The Jacka & Erk The Jerk [Neighborhood Superstar 4]
- 2017 Young Dolph & Berner – Tracking Numbers feat Philthy Rich [Tracking Numbers]
- 2017 Young Dolph & Berner – Heron feat Wiz Khalifa [Tracking Numbers]
- 2017 Young Dolph & Berner – Die Young feat PeeWee Longway [Tracking Numbers]
- 2018 Godholly – Green Light – Black Lightning (TV series)
- 2018 Shawn Cook – Intro [The Silky Slim LP]
- 2018 Shawn Cook – In My Lane [The Silky Slim LP]
- 2018 Shawn Cook – Loud feat Iamsu [The Silky Slim LP]
- 2018 Shawn Cook – The Answer [The Silky Slim LP]
- 2018 Shawn Cook – Airplanes, Strains & Automobiles feat Berner & Chippass [The Silky Slim LP]
- 2018 Shawn Cook – The Distance feat J Boog [The Silky Slim LP]
- 2018 Shawn Cook – Free To Go [The Silky Slim LP]
- 2018 Berner – Miss Me feat Wiz Khalifa & Styles P [RICO]
- 2019 Adrian Marcel – Slow Burn
- 2019 Demrick – No Wasting Time EP [Also Executive Producer]

== Television ==
- 2009 BET American Gangster (TV series) – Episode – "Mac Dre & The Romper Room Gang"
- 2018 The CW Black Lightning (TV series) – Episode 4 – "Rotten Tomatoes"

== Other media ==
- 2005 Jim Jones A Day in the Fast Life – We Want in feat. Max B, NOE DVD
