= Tiny Doo =

American hip hop artist, rapper and musician

- Born: Brandon Duncan
- Genres: Hip hop
- Occupations: Rapper, musician

Brandon Duncan, better known by his stage name Tiny Doo, is an American hip hop artist, rapper and musician.

In 2014, controversy surrounded his album No Safety after San Diego, California authorities charged Duncan with being part of a criminal conspiracy and thus promoting and profiting from Lincoln Park Blood gang activity described in his lyrics.

Tiny Doo is featured in the 2024 documentary Cover Your Ears produced by Prairie Coast Films and directed by Sean Patrick Shaul, discussing music censorship and his conspiracy trial.

== Discography ==
=== Studio albums ===
- What It Doo (2006)
- What It Doo, Vol. 2 (2011)
- What It Doo, Vol. 3: Black Hoodie Muzik (2011)
- No Safety (2014)

=== with Tiny Beef ===
- Tiny 2X (2011)
