= Gennessee Lewis =

- Born: Gennessee Lewis; January 23, 1974 (age 52)
- Origin: Berkeley, California, California, U.S.
- Genres: Hip hop, rap, R&B
- Occupations: Songwriter, record producer
- Instruments: Vocals, synthesizer, keyboards, turntables, drum machine, sampler
- Years active: 1984–present
- Label: Noble House Music Group
- Website: Gennessee Lewis on Myspace

Gennessee Lewis (born January 23, 1974), primarily known by his stage name Gennessee, is an American record producer, songwriter and record executive. He is the founder and current CEO of Noble House Music Group, also having produced records for and overseeing the careers of many rappers such as Dogwood Speaks and Haji Springer. As a producer he is credited as producing for Mac Dre, Baby Bash, Frankie J, One Block Radius, and Paul Wall.

== Career ==
In 2008, he produced "Choc-O-Lat" for One Block Radius and spent one week on the Billboard Top R&B/Hip-Hop Albums chart, at number 86. After the completion of “If You Were My Girlfriend”, a record Lewis wrote for Frankie J in 2009, he partnered with Baby Bash to do numerous co-writes. Lewis also writes and composes for other rising artists, and has partnered with fellow producers Cozmo Hickox and Max Perry.

During the 2000s, he focused his career on production for other artists, while occasionally contributing vocals in other artists' songs. His publishing company, GenStar Music, is building its catalogue of songs and has found additional success in licensing and songwriting.

== Noble House Music Group ==
- Dogwood Speaks

== Discography ==
- 2004 Mac Dre - Fa My Niggaz [Ronald Dregan]
- 2004 Mac Dre - Dreganomics [Ronald Dregan]
- 2004 Mac Dre - On The Run [Ronald Dregan]
- 2004 Mac Dre - Out There [Genie of the Lamp]
- 2005 Mistah F.A.B. - If Papa Was Home [Son of a Pimp]
- 2005 Mistah F.A.B. - Where's My Daddy [Son of a Pimp]
- 2006 The Team - Good Girl [World Premiere]
- 2006 Lil' Jordan - Next Generation [R U Ready 4 Me?]
- 2006 Lil' Jordan - 2 The Top [R U Ready 4 Me?]
- 2006 Lil' Jordan - See Me Rock [R U Ready 4 Me?]
- 2006 Lil' Jordan - Golf Man Dance feat Mistah FAB [R U Ready 4 Me?]
- 2006 Lil' Jordan - My Bro [R U Ready 4 Me?]
- 2006 Lil' Jordan - Puppy Love [R U Ready 4 Me?]
- 2006 Lil' Jordan - Swing 4 The Dream feat Cait La Dee [R U Ready 4 Me?]
- 2006 Lil' Jordan - Hey Jordan feat Julissa Leilani [R U Ready 4 Me?]
- 2006 Lil' Jordan - #1 Fan feat Genevieve Goings [R U Ready 4 Me?]
- 2006 Lil' Jordan - My time to Shine [R U Ready 4 Me?]
- 2007 Genevieve Goings - In this Bed [Diversity Personified]
- 2007 Genevieve Goings - On Fire [Diversity Personified]
- 2009 DL da ARSUN - Like No Other [Work Now Play Later Vol.1]
