= J Boog =

American-Samoan reggae singer (born 1983)

- Born: Jerry Fealofani Afemata; 1983 (age 42–43); Long Beach, California, U.S.
- Origin: Hawaii
- Genres: Reggae
- Occupations: Singer, songwriter
- Years active: 2007–present
- Label: Wash House
- Website: jboogmusic.net

Jerry Fealofani Afemata (born 1983), better known by his stage name J Boog, is an American-Samoan reggae singer and songwriter. J Boog has released three albums that reached the top ten of the Billboard Reggae Albums chart, debuting with Hear Me Roar in 2007. His next two albums, Backyard Boogie (2011) and Wash House Ting (2016), both reached number one on the Reggae Albums chart.

== Early life ==
Afemata was born in Long Beach, California and grew up in nearby Compton with six siblings in a Samoan American family. As a child, Afemata became interested in reggae music after seeing his sister play the Bob Marley song "Jamming" on the piano. His siblings gave Afemata the nickname "Boog", a play on "boogie" and reference to him not being able to sit still. Afemata first sang for an audience at age nine when his mother had him and his sister sing the Whitney Houston song "One Moment in Time" at a family reunion.

Afemata attended Paramount High School, enrolling because his parents registered him with his cousin's address in neighboring Paramount. While in high school, Afemata began listening to hip hop and the ska punk band Sublime. After graduating from high school, Afemata worked at an oil refinery near Los Angeles and sang at nightclubs outside of his regular job.

== Music career ==
During a 2005 vacation in Hawaii, Afemata met Fijian reggae singer George "Fiji" Veikoso and provided a mixtape of his to Veikoso, who had a positive impression listening to it. Recording as J Boog, Afemata collaborated with Veikoso for his 2007 debut album Hear Me Roar, which debuted on the Billboard reggae albums chart on March 1 and peaked at no. 8 on March 22, 2008.

J Boog found more success in 2011 with his self-titled EP that peaked at no. 3 on the Billboard reggae albums chart in July 2011. In October 2011, his second album Backyard Boogie debuted on the top of the reggae chart. Backyard Boogie featured the singles "Let Me Know", "Let's Do It Again", and "Sunshine Girl". "Let's Do It Again" was later certified Silver by the British Phonographic Industry (BPI) in 2022. J Boog's 2013 EP Live Up!, reached no. 3 on the reggae albums chart. Then in 2014, J Boog collaborated with Hawaiian singer Anuhea and reggae band SOJA for the single "Easier".

In April 2016, Boog's EP Rose Petals topped the Reggae Albums chart. Then in November 2016, Boog released his third album Wash House Ting, his first full-length album in five years and second straight to reach the top of the Reggae Albums chart.

On August 31, 2023, Afemata performed In Anchorage, Alaska at the Alaska state fair. Boog performed "Siva mai" and the crowd loved it. Shortly after, Afemata performed "Ganja Farmer" who he dedicated to his older brother.

== Discography ==
- Hear Me Roar (2007)
- J Boog - EP (2011)
- Backyard Boogie (2011)
- Wash House Ting (2016)
- Pennies From Heaven (2023)
- Heartbeat (2025)
