= Berner (rapper) =

American rapper and cannabis entrepreneur

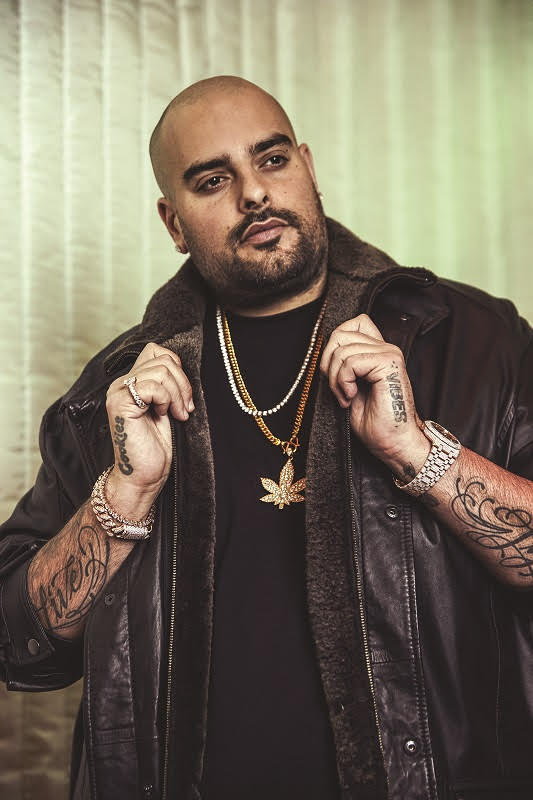
- Berner in 2019

Background information
- Born: Gilbert Anthony Milam Jr. October 27, 1983 (age 43); San Francisco, California, U.S.
- Genre: West Coast hip-hop
- Occupations: Rapper; songwriter; entrepreneur
- Years active: 2007–present
- Labels: EMPIRE; GT Digital; Bern One; Taylor Gang
- Children: 4
- Website: cookies.co cookiessf.com

Gilbert Anthony Milam Jr. (born October 27, 1983), known professionally as Berner, is an American rapper and cannabis entrepreneur. As of 2025, he has released 22 solo albums — beginning with Dirty Sneakers... Plenty Ways to Get It (2007) — and 29 collaborative projects — beginning with Track Money & Pack Money (2007) with fellow California rapper Equipto. He signed with Wiz Khalifa's Taylor Gang Entertainment in March 2018.

Four of his solo releases—the extended play 20 Lights (2015), and the albums Hempire (2016), Gotti (2021), and From Seed to Sale (2022)—have entered the Billboard 200, the latter peaked at number 20. As an entrepreneur, he founded the cannabis brand Cookies in 2015; initially based in San Francisco, it has since expanded to service cannabis and clothing products internationally.

== Early life ==
A Sunset District native, Berner attended Galileo Academy of Science and Technology before dropping out. His mother was an office worker and his father was a chef at a Mexican restaurant on Fillmore Street. When Berner was 13, the family moved to Arizona, where his father planned to open a restaurant. During high school, Berner began battle rapping and in 2006 he released his first mixtape, Dirty Sneakers...Plenty Ways to Get It.

== Musical career ==
After forming his own label, Bern One Entertainment in 2007, Berner released his debut album, Track Money & Pack Money, with Equipto. His first solo album, Weekend at Bernie's arrived in 2009, along with four other albums.

In March 2012, Berner signed to Wiz Khalifa's Taylor Gang Records. Urban Farmer, Berner's first collection to be released on Taylor Gang Records, was released on October 2, 2012. In 2013, Berner performed on the "Under the Influence of Music Tour" alongside Khalifa, A$AP Rocky, Trinidad Jame$ and Joey Bada$$. In 2015, Berner released Contraband, a collaborative album with Cam'ron, as well as Drought Season 3 with deceased rapper The Jacka. In 2016, Berner released the solo album Hempire, also producing a 4/20 show at the Bill Graham Civic Auditorium with a lineup that included Cypress Hill, Juicy J, Dizzy Wright, J Boog, Kool John, and Berner.

Urban Farmer, another of Berner's albums, features Iamsu! from The HBK Gang on two tracks; and the Jacka, Rydah J. Klyde and San Quinn on 21 Gunz.

Berner's single, 20 Lights reached number 95 on the Billboard 200 chart. It was released on January 6, 2015. "Best Thang Smokin" is the lead single in Berner's album Hempire, released April 1, 2016.

On May 4, 2019, he released the album El Chivo.

== Cookies cannabis brand ==
Berner began working in the cannabis industry at age 18 at a San Francisco dispensary named The Hemp Center. In the early 2000s he befriended a cultivator named Jai Chang (a.k.a. "Jigga"), who developed a strain of cannabis that he named "Girl Scout Cookies". Berner and Chang began selling various strains that Chang developed to dispensaries, including Girl Scout Cookies. After the Girl Scouts of the USA sent a cease and desist letter, they named their brand simply "Cookies". Berner was also selling the strains to friends, including rapper Wiz Khalifa whom he met in 2010. Khalifa soon began mentioning Cookies in his rap songs, while Berner wore clothing bearing a Cookies logo in music videos that he appeared in. Berner went on to develop a line of Cookies clothing wear and opened the first Cookies clothing store in San Francisco in 2015. He also began opening Cookies dispensaries, with the first appearing in Los Angeles in 2018, followed by the first on the East Coast opening in 2021. Using a business model similar to franchising, Cookies expanded to a total of 49 dispensaries by June 2022 to go along with "Cookies SF" clothing stores in San Francisco and Los Angeles. A third clothing store also serving as a "Cookies University" was opened in Manhattan in October 2022, but was later repurposed into a dispensary.

In August 2022, Berner was the first cannabis executive to be featured on the cover of Forbes magazine. Forbes conservatively estimated the Cookies brand to be worth $150 million.

By January 2024, Cookies had expanded to seventy dispensaries across the U.S., Canada, Israel, and Thailand, according to a profile of Berner in The New York Times Magazine.

== Personal life ==
Berner was diagnosed with stage 3 colon cancer in 2021, but it went into remission after chemotherapy.

Berner has four children from his relationships. In July 2007, he welcomed his first child, a daughter named Janelle Marie Milam, with his former partner, Sophia. Janelle later became a teenage entrepreneur, founding the youth clothing brand Heartblaster.

On January 15, 2022, Berner married April Martinez. The marriage ended in divorce by 2023. [1]

Following his divorce, Berner began a relationship with Ashley, a native of Hanford, California. On March 2, 2024, the couple welcomed their first child together, a son named Gilbert Anthony Milam Jr. Berner and Ashley were married on November 11, 2025. They subsequently expanded their family with the birth of a daughter, Jodi Moon Milam, followed by a second daughter, Layla Milam, born on July 10, 2026. [1, 2, 3]

== Discography ==
=== Solo albums ===
- Dirty Sneakers... Plenty Ways To Get It (2007)
- Weekend At Bernie's (2009)
- The White Album (2011)
- Urban Farmer (2012)
- Drugstore Cowboy (2013)
- Drugstore Cowboy (Deluxe Edition) (2013)
- 20 Lights EP (2015) – US Billboard 200 No. 95
- Hempire (2016) – US Billboard 200 No. 54
- Packs (2016)
- Berner (DJ Michael Watts Swisha House Remix) (2016)
- Sleepwalking (2017)
- The Big Pescado (2018)
- RICO (2018)
- 11/11 (2018)
- Drugstore Cowboy (DJ Michael Watts Swisha House Remix) (2019)
- El Chivo (2019)
- La Plaza (2019)
- Russ Bufalino: The Quiet Don (2020)
- Paulie Cicero (2021)
- Gotti (2021) – US Billboard 200 No. 23
- Gotti (Deluxe Edition) (2022)
- From Seed To Sale (2022) – US Billboard 200 No. 20
- Arrogance Is Ignorance (One Shot Kill) (2023)
- The Farmers Market (2024)
- HOFFA (2024)
- Carbon EP (2025)
- 09 (2025)
- Profit & Pain EP (2026)
- Sitting Bull (2026)

=== Collaboration albums ===
- 2007: Track Money & Pack Money (with Equipto)
- 2008: Drought Season (with The Jacka)
- 2009: Demolition Men Presents: Duffle Bag Money (with Equipto)
- 2009: Drought Season 2 (with The Jacka)
- 2009: Blow (with Messy Marv)
- 2009: Traffic (with Ampichino)
- 2010: Traffic 2: Trains, Planes, & Automobiles (with Ampichino)
- 2010: Blow (Blocks & Boat Docks) (with Messy Marv)
- 2012: Border Wars (with The Jacka)
- 2013: Cookies & Cream (with San Quinn)
- 2013: The Best Of Traffic (with Ampichino)
- 2014: Prohibition (with B-Real)
- 2015: Drought Season 3 (with The Jacka)
- 2015: Harvest Season (with Liqz)
- 2015: Prohibition (Part 2) (with B-Real)
- 2015: Contraband EP (with Cam'ron)
- 2015: Good For Nothing (with Messy Marv)
- 2016: Prohibition (Part 3) (with B-Real)
- 2016: Public Enemies (with Lil Evil & Aftah Sum)
- 2016: Guilty By Association 2: Criminal Enterprise (with Rich Rocka aka Ya Boy & San Quinn)
- 2017: Vibes (with Styles P)
- 2017: Tracking Numbers EP (with Young Dolph)
- 2018: Terra Firma EP (with Omni Alien)
- 2019: Slimey Individualz (with Mozzy)
- 2019: Pheno Grigio (with Curren$y)
- 2020: Los Meros (with B-Real)
- 2020: The Warning (with R-Mean)
- 2020: Cooks & Orange Juice EP (with Larry June)
- 2020: Respect The Connect (with Cozmo)
- 2021: They Land Better In Manchester EP (with Tunde)
- 2023: Trophies (with OhGeesy)
- 2024: 100 Sources Of Income (with DRODi)
- 2025: Timeless (with Mando)
- 2026: Cartel Symphony (with Nava)
- 2026: Inside The Bag (with B-Real)

=== Compilations ===
- 2010: The Best Of Goldtoes & Berner
- 2014: Dirty Money Compilation (Volume 1)
- 2017: Dirty Money Compilation (Volume 2)
- 2017: Dirty Money Compilation (Volume 2) (Chopped Not Slopped)

=== Singles ===
- 2008: "Purp" (Remix) with The Jacka (featuring B-Legit, Cozmo, & Matt Blaque)
- 2009: "Got Work" (featuring Bun B)
- 2010: "This Love" (featuring Supa Sag)
- 2011: "Flyn" (featuring Homewrecka & Smiggz)
- 2011: "Dirty"
- 2011: "Yoko" (featuring Wiz Khalifa & Big K.R.I.T.)
- 2011: "Day Dreamin'"
- 2011: "Yoko" (Remix) (featuring Wiz Khalifa, Big K.R.I.T., & Chris Brown)
- 2012: "Exhale" (featuring Cozmo)
- 2012: "No Handcuffs" (featuring Chevy Woods)
- 2013: "Vega" (Freestyle)
- 2013: "Wide Open" (featuring Project Pat)
- 2013: "Goodstock" (featuring Chevy Woods & Tuki Carter)
- 2013: "If I Don't Gotta" (featuring Freeze & Smiggz)
- 2013: "Paradise" (featuring Wiz Khalifa)
- 2013: "Me & You" (featuring Suga Free)
- 2013: "All In" with San Quinn (featuring Baldhead Rick)
- 2013: "Fly Away" with San Quinn (featuring Equipto)
- 2013: "Get High"
- 2013: "Working Girl"
- 2013: "That's How The $ Money Came"
- 2013: "Get High" (Remix) (featuring Designer D, Strae Bullet, & Nit Da Pit)
- 2013: "Don't Stop" (featuring Gage Gully)
- 2013: "Home Of The Cookies" (featuring Anonymous That Dude)
- 2014: "Dirty Money"
- 2014: "Chapo" (featuring Wiz Khalifa)
- 2014: "Dizzy"
- 2014: "20 Joints"
- 2014: "Trippin'" (Freestyle)
- 2014: "So Much Joy" (featuring Anonymous That Dude)
- 2014: "Thru"
- 2014: "Mess"
- 2014: "Check Talk" (featuring Slicc Pulla)
- 2014: "All In A Day" (featuring YG, Young Thug, & Vital)
- 2014: "Everything Everything" (with Wiz Khalifa, Iamsu!, JR Donato, & Kool John)
- 2014: "Sell It All" (Freestyle)
- 2015: "Cookies In A Bag" (featuring Swinla & Young Boo)
- 2015: "Still I Ride"
- 2015: "Money First" with Dinero G (featuring Lucky Luciano)
- 2015: "Street Money" (Freestyle)
- 2015: "Mind Blown" (featuring Anonymous That Dude)
- 2015: "Murda Murda" (with Paul Wall & Demrick)
- 2015: "Foreign" (featuring Keak Da Sneak, Sage The Gemini, & Snow Tha Product)
- 2015: "Lifetime"
- 2015: "100 P's (Part 2)"
- 2015: "Dopeboy Dance" (featuring Nef The Pharaoh & Dyce)
- 2015: "Why Wait?" with Camron (featuring Wiz Khalifa & 2 Chainz)
- 2016: "Changes" (featuring Mistah F.A.B.)
- 2016: "On My Own" (Freestyle)
- 2016: "Gun Play" (Remix) (featuring Wiz Khalifa & Hollywood)
- 2017: "Deep Thoughts" (featuring AG Cubano & Don Chino)
- 2017: "Hello" (featuring Jimmy Da Butcher)
- 2018: "Light Show" (featuring Kevin Gates)
- 2019: "Cookies In A Bag" (Remix) (featuring San Quinn, Swinla, & Young Boo)
- 2019: "I'ma Hustla" (with Prodkt & Louie Loc)
- 2020: "No Mids" (featuring G-Mainey)
- 2020: "Bay Area Flavors" (with Too $hort, J Diggs, & Goldtoes)
- 2020: "On God" with R-Mean (featuring Dave East)
- 2020: "Real Shit" with R-Mean (featuring Chris Webby)
- 2020: "Kings" with R-Mean (featuring Wiz Khalifa & B-Real)
- 2020: "Mafia" with R-Mean (featuring Styles P)
- 2022: "Elon"
- 2022: "Cold Champagne For Lunch"
- 2022: "On One"
- 2023: "Bay Area Flavors" (Remix) (with Too $hort, J Diggs, Goldtoes, & Jenny 69)
- 2023: "I Want That Too"
- 2023: "Microdose" (featuring Stinje & Yung Chowder)
- 2025: "She Wanna" (featuring Kafeeno)
- 2025: "Papered Up" (featuring E-40)
- 2025: "Boogers" (featuring 310babii & Yung Chowder)
