= San Quinn =

American rapper

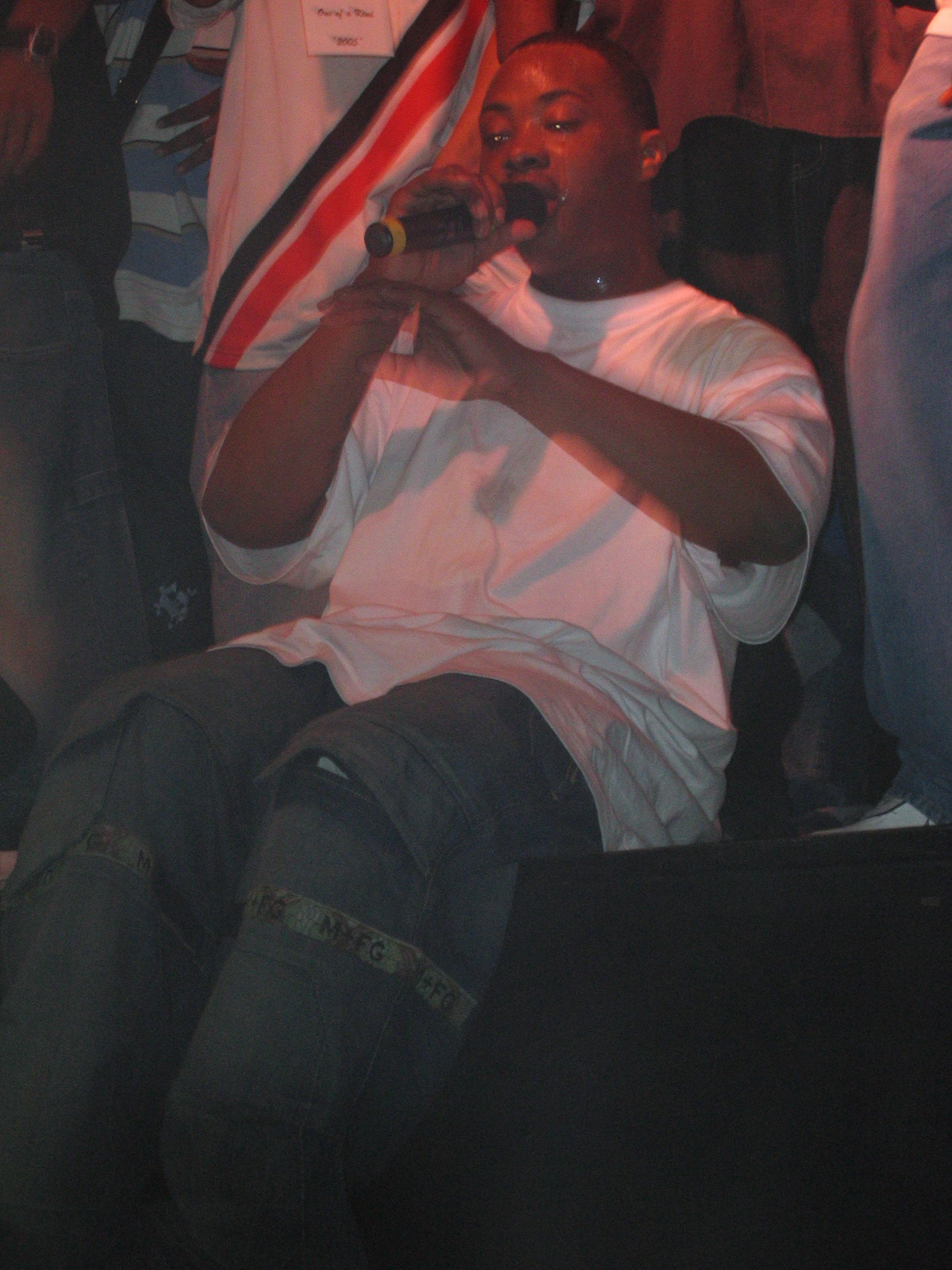
- San Quinn performing in 2006

Background information
- Born: Quincy Adams Brooks; Oakland, California, U.S.
- Origin: San Francisco, California, U.S.
- Genre: Hip hop
- Occupations: Rapper; songwriter
- Years active: 1989–present
- Labels: Get Low; Done Deal Ent.; SMC

Quincy Adams Brooks, known professionally as San Quinn, is an American rapper from San Francisco, California. He is the cousin of Messy Marv (by marriage), Stevie Johnson, and Ya Boy.

== Early life ==
Brooks was born in Oakland, and grew up in the Fillmore District of San Francisco since the age of three. He attended George Washington High School.

== Career ==
Brooks made his first rap appearance as an opening act for 2Pac and Digital Underground at the age of 12. He recorded his first album at 14 years old. In addition to a solo career, Brooks is also a member of the San Francisco rap group Get Low Playaz with JT The Bigga Figga, D-Moe, and Seff Tha Gaffla. One of Brooks' most notable tracks is "Shock the Party", which samples Whodini's "One Love". The video for "Shock the Party" was filmed in the Fillmore district of San Francisco in the now-defunct Buena Vista Plaza East public housing towers, commonly referred to as OC (Outta Control) Housing Projects.

== Discography ==
=== Studio albums ===
- 1993 Don't Cross Me
- 1994: Live N’ Direct
- 1996: The Hustle Continues
- 2001: The Mighty Quinn
- 2004: I Give You My Word
- 2006: The Rock: Pressure Makes Diamonds
- 2007: The Color Of Money
- 2008: From A Boy To A Man
- 2009: The Rock: Pressure Makes Diamonds (Collectors Edition)
- 2009: The Tonite Show (Addressing The Beef) With San Quinn (with DJ.Fresh)
- 2010: I Never Left
- 2011: The Redemption Of Quincy Brooks (Volume 1)
- 2011: Can't Take The Ghetto Out A Nigga
- 2011: G.O.D. (Guns, Oil, And Drugs Recession Proof)
- 2013: What Goes Around Comes Around: Good Karma
- 2014: Since 17 Reasons
- 2015: The Fillmore Lion
- 2015: Double Dose Of Gangsta
- 2016: Savvin With A Passion
- 2018: 89
- 2019: Stronger Than Ever
- 2019: The Re-Rock
- 2020: Hustle Til I Drop
- 2021: Quinndomania
- 2021: The Hustle Still Continues
- 2023: T.H.S.C. (The Extraz)

=== Compilation albums ===
- 1998: San Quinn Presents: 17 Reasons Compilation
- 1998: San Quinn Presents: Isolated In The Game
- 2001: 4.5.7. Is The Code
- 2002: Repossessions
- 2003: Mind Motion Presents: The Done Deal Party
- 2003: Quinndo Mania!: The Best Of San Quinn
- 2003: Collectors Pack
- 2004: The Best Of San Quinn (Remixed By DJ Ghost)
- 2005: 4.5.7. Is The Code (Part 2)
- 2006: 4.5.7. Is The Code (Part 3)
- 2007: Extreme Danger
- 2011: Best Of Frisco Street Show
- 2012: Giants & Elephants Radio (Volume 2): We Own The Streets
- 2014: Street Platinum (The Ultimate Album)
- 2014: DLK Collabs (Volume 3)

=== Collaboration albums ===
- 1998: Messy Marv & San Quinn - Explosive Mode
- 2002: The Done Deal Fam - Runs In The Family
- 2006: Assassin & San Quinn - Fillmoe 2 San Jo 2
- 2006: C-Bo & San Quinn - 100 Racks In My Backpack
- 2006: Messy Marv & San Quinn - Explosive Mode 2 (Back In Business)
- 2006: Messy Marv & The Jacka & Husalah & San Quinn - Explosive Mode 3
- 2007: San Quinn & T-Nutty - A Warrior And A King Lyrical Kingdom
- 2008: JT The Bigga Figga & Messy Marv & San Quinn - Fillmoe Hardheads
- 2008: San Quinn & Big Rich & Boo Banga aka All City - 41Feva
- 2008: Keak Da Sneak & San Quinn - Welcome To Scokland
- 2010: San Quinn & E.Klips Da Hustla - Detrimental
- 2010: San Quinn & Loyal-T - Never Say Die
- 2010: San Quinn Presents - Mixtape Muzik (Volume 1)
- 2011: San Quinn & Tuf Luv - A Hustler's Hope
- 2011: Insain & San Quinn - I’m Just Sayin’ Tho
- 2012: San Quinn & E.Klips Da Hustla - Detrimental 2 (No Mercy)
- 2012: Relly Rell & Lil Tim aka Mozzy & San Quinn - Hustle & Blow
- 2013: Berner & San Quinn - Cookies & Cream
- 2013: San Quinn & Extreme - Red Cups & Poker Chips
- 2013: Bueno & T-Nutty & C.M.L. aka Lavish D & Dezit Eaze & San Quinn - Omina Laboratories Presents: Gangsta
- 2014: The Jacka & The Hoodstarz & San Quinn - One
- 2014: Vic Da Baron & San Quinn - A Blue Tie Affair
- 2014: William Breed & San Quinn - Polly With The Bosses
- 2015: San Quinn & Sav Abinitio - Money Talks
- 2016: Young Sight & San Quinn - We Give You Our Word
- 2016: Neighborhood Connection & San Quinn - Spit It From The Lip
- 2016: Berner & Rich Rocka aka Ya Boy & San Quinn - Guilty By Association 2 (Criminal Enterprise)
- 2017: Insain & San Quinn - The Green Carpet Treatment
- 2018: Telly Mac & San Quinn - City Situations
- 2018: San Quinn & Cuddy & Telly Mac & Zone 28 Grams - H-Town To The Bay (Part 2)
- 2018: Cuddy & LV Tha Don & San Quinn - West Coast All Stars
- 2018: Celly Cel & San Quinn - Bay Waters Run Deep
- 2018: Messy Marv & San Quinn - Explosive Mode 4 (Explosive As Usual)
- 2019: The Gatlin & San Quinn - Dope Boy Habits
- 2019: Yoey The Fundraider & San Quinn - Slow Feet Don’t Eat
- 2019: Dela The Fella & San Quinn - Roseland 2
- 2019: San Quinn & V1C - A Rhyme Is A Terrible Thing To Waste
- 2019: Telly Mac & Seff Tha Gaffla & San Quinn - Tha Sucka Free Chronicles
- 2019: S.L. & San Quinn - Related By Loyalty
- 2019: The Gatlin & San Quinn - Dope Boy Habits (Deluxe Edition)
- 2020: Street Knowledge & San Quinn - Legendary Knowledge
- 2020: DZ & San Quinn - Natural Born Hustlers
- 2020: Lavish Rich & San Quinn - Ism On Display
- 2020: Kane & San Quinn - Independent Hustle
- 2020: Young Sight & San Quinn - Trampoline Dreams
- 2020: Pimpin Caprice & San Quinn - Road Runner
- 2020: San Quinn & Thizz Latin Hayward - Kalico Kid Meets Quinn
- 2020: Young Feta & San Quinn - Loyalty
- 2021: KR Mack & San Quinn - The Bussdown
- 2021: Young Feta & San Quinn - Loyalty 2
- 2022: San Quinn & V1C - Bay Bridgenezz
- 2022: Baby S & San Quinn - California Livin’
- 2023: San Quinn & N$n Klippa - Detrimental (Volume 3)
- 2023: Mob$ta Myk & San Quinn - Roseland 2.1
- 2023: C-Dubb & San Quinn - The MOB Hour Continues
- 2023: Baby S & San Quinn - Live
- 2024: Grimy Moe Bucks & San Quinn - The Dopest Of The Dope
- 2024: Bobby California & San Quinn - FillMohr
- 2024: Messy Marv & San Quinn & Jocknation - Well Connected
- 2024: Young Feta & San Quinn - Loyalty 3
- 2025: 6 Ether Da Death Deala & San Quinn - MOB Language
- 2025: Keyon Cash & Ruegar & Matt Blaque & Vitani & San Quinn & Spiff Of The Very Few - Old Cash New Money
- 2026: Nutso & San Quinn - The Mayor & The Outlaw
- 2026: C-Dubb & San Quinn - MOB Era Back Again
- 2026: 6 Ether Da Death Deala & San Quinn - MOB Language 2 (Good American Business)

=== with Get Low Playaz ===
- 1995: Straight Out The Labb
- 1996: What We Known Fo
- 1998: The Package
- 2000: The Family Business
- 2006: In The Streets Of Fillmoe

=== Mixtapes ===
- 2007: DJ Juice Presents: Bay Area Mixtape (Volume 7) (Hosted By San Quinn)
- 2010: I Never Left
- 2012: The Mighty (Volume 1)
- 2013: All In The City

=== Singles ===
- 2020: “Oh La Aye” (featuring Freeway, produced by Monk HTS)
