= T-Nutty =

American rapper

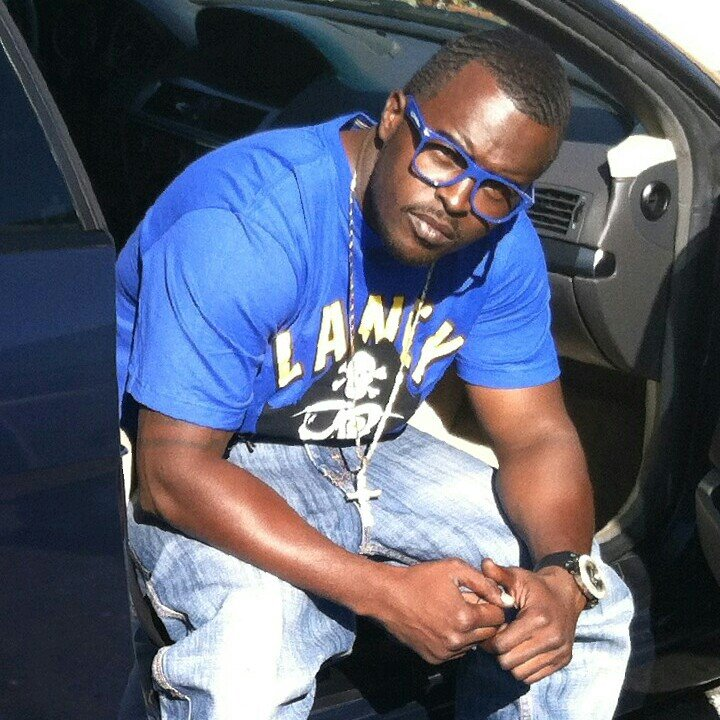
- T-Nutty in 2016

Background information
- Born: Todd Jones Jr. Sacramento, California
- Genres: Hip hop, west coast hip hop, Gangsta rap
- Occupation: Rapper
- Years active: 2002–present
- Labels: Black Armor Records, Murder Creek Music

Todd Jones Jr., also known as T-Nutty, The Flowmastermouth, or The Last of the Flo Heakinz, is an American rapper from Sacramento, California. He has appeared on albums such as Tech N9ne's Misery Loves Kompany and K.O.D..

== Discography ==
=== Studio albums ===
- 2002: The Gasoline (Bootleg fan made)
- 2003: Last Of The Floheakinz
- 2004: Flowmastermouth (West Walkin')
- 2005: The Nutt Factor Project
- 2008: Raw From Da Jaw Chapter 3
- 2010: Perfect Attendance
- 2011: The Tonite Show (Channel 24st) With T-Nutty (with DJ.Fresh)
- 2013: Sac It Up And Serve It Gas Chamber 2.4
- 2016: Blue Venom
- 2018: Return Of The Floheakin
- 2024: Down 2 Da Doobie

=== with Big Rocc ===
- State 2 State (The Soundtrack) (2006)

=== with Big NoLove 69EC ===
- Lyrical Octane (Tha Gas Effect) (2005)

=== with Black Armor Records ===
- The Best Kept Secretz (Volume 1) (2002)

=== with DJ Mighty Mike ===
- Bar 4 Bar (The Street Album) (2010)

=== with Liq ===
- Slangin' And Bangin' (2012)
- Slangin' And Bangin' (Part 2) (2017)

=== with Messy Marv ===
- Tha 2nd & 3rd Letter (2009)

=== with Mr. Skrillz & Doey Rock & Hollow Tip ===
- Sactown's Most Wanted (2011)

=== with San Quinn ===
- A Warrior And A King (Lyrical Kingdom) (2007)

=== with San Quinn & Bueno & Lavish D & Dezit Eaze ===
- Omina Laboratories Presents: Gangsta (2013)

=== with I-Rocc ===
- Hustlas Convention (2016)

=== with Luni Coleone & Get Rich ===
- The Legendary (2018)

=== with DZ ===
- PlayMakers (2025)
