= Tha Realest discography =

This is the discography of American rapper Tha Realest.

== Albums ==
=== Studio albums ===
- Witness Tha Realest
  - Released: July 14, 2009
  - Label: RBC, Team Dime Entertainment, Koch Records
  - Chart positions: TBR (U.S. Top 200)
  - Singles: "Peep'n Game, Get It N"

=== Mixtapes ===
- Tha Realest Presents: Me and My Mufuka'z
  - Released: 2005
  - Label: Omerta Entertainment
- Witness Tha Realest Mixtape
  - Released: October 3, 2006
  - Label: Tru 'Dat' Entertainment
  - Free to download
- From East 2 West
  - With: 730
  - Released: July 10, 2007
  - Label: Mob Life Records
  - Free to download
- Tha Death Row Dayz Vol. 1 (2 CDs)
  - Released: August 11, 2007
  - Label: For The People Entertainment
- Tha Death Row Dayz Vol. 2
  - Released: November 29, 2007
  - Label: For The People Entertainment
- Mob Muzik
  - With: Wack Deuce & G-Mack
  - Released: April, 2008
  - Label: Team Dime Entertainment
  - Single: "In The Streetz"

== Guest appearances ==
- "Masta Plan" Eastside featuring Tha Realest (The Battlefield) (1997)
- "City" Eastside featuring Tha Realest, Chyné & Z Bennet (The Battlefield) (1997)
- "Free 'Em All" J-Flexx featuring Tha Realest & Stephanie Fredric (Gang Related – The Soundtrack) (1997)
- "A Change To Come" J-Flexx featuring Tha Realest, Bahamadia, Kool & the Gang & Con Funk Shun (Gang Related – The Soundtrack) (1997)
- "It's Goin' Down" Mac Shawn featuring Daz Dillinger, Tha Realest & Black Tovin (Suge Knight Represents: Chronic 2000) (1999)
- "Because of You Girl" Tha Dogg Pound featuring Tha Realest (Suge Knight Represents: Chronic 2000) (1999)
- "Gangsta" The Relativez featuring Tha Realest (The Takeover) (2002)
- "C-Bo & Tha Realest" C-Bo featuring Tha Realest (The Mobfather) (2003)
- "Somebody Gone Die 2 Nite" Yukmouth featuring Benjilino, Tech N9ne, Hussein Fatal & Tha Realest (Godzilla) (2003)
- "United Ghettos Of America, Part 2" The Regime (Tha Realest, C-Bo, Spice 1, Dru Down, 151, Eastwood & Roscoe) (United Ghettos of America Vol. 2) (2004)
- "Me And My Mufuka'z" Tha Realest featuring G-Twin (Mob Life Records Presents On The Grind Vol.1) (2004)
- "Fuck You" 730 featuring Tha Realest & Swoop G (Spit In Ya Face) (2004)
- "Me and 730" 730 featuring Tha Realest (County Blues) (2005)
- "Blast First" The Regime (Messy Marv, Yukmouth & Tha Realest) (All Out War Volume 1) (2005)
- "They Wanna Be Like Us (Street Mix)" Top Dogg featuring Tha Realest & Doobie (Every Dogg Has His Day) (2005)
- "Payback" The Regime (C-Bo, Tha Realest, The Jacka, Yukmouth & Gonzoe) (All Out War Volume 2) (2005)
- "Bring Some Friendz" Speedy featuring Tha Realest (Flight Risk) (2005)
- "Live That Young Lyfe " Young Lyfe (featuring Tha Realest) (Real Lyfe) (2005)
- "Fuck Friends" Tha Realest (X Games) (2006)
- "What You Know About Gatz" The Regime (Yukmouth, Tha Realest, Dru Down) (All Out War Volume 3) (2006)
- "Trapp Ni99a" The Regime (Gonzoe, Yukmouth & Tha Realest) (All Out War Volume 3) (2006)
- "Tha M.O.B." The Regime (Yukmouth, Tha Realest, Monsta Ganjah & Kenny Kingpen) (All Out War Volume 3) (2006)
- "You Already Know" The Regime (Mike-Dee, Tha Realest, Monsta Ganjah & Yukmouth) (All Out War Volume 3) (2006)
- "Regime 4 Life" The Regime (Yukmouth, Tha Realest & Pretty Black) (All Out War Volume 3) (2006)
- "Still Know All About You'" Bizzy Bone featuring Tha Realest (Evolution of Elevation) (2006)
- "Addicted II Trouble" Yukmouth featuring Tha Realest (Million Dollar Mixtape) (2006)
- "Live A Full Life" C-Bo & Killa Tay featuring Tha Realest (The Moment of Truth) (2006)
- "Imma Killa" C-Bo & Killa Tay featuring Tha Realest & Mitchy Slick (The Moment of Truth) (2006)
- "Live Wire" Chop Black featuring Tha Realest (Mercenary Mixtape, Vol. 2: Stupid Hyphy) (2006)
- "Touchin' Tickets" Lil' Cyco featuring Tha Realest & Smigg Dirtee (Get Money, Have Heart) (2006)
- "Ridin' Wit Me" Lil' Cyco featuring Tha Realest & C-Bo (Get Money, Have Heart) (2006)
- "Get Out of Town" Pretty Black featuring Tha Realest, Monsta Gunjah & Fed X (Prince of the Streets) (2006)
- "Mob Muzik" Yukmouth featuring Tha Realest & Monsta Gunjah (100 Racks) (2006)
- "They Mad I Laugh" Yukmouth featuring Tha Realest & Pretty Black (100 Racks) (2006)
- "Wassup Homey" Lefty Knucles featuring Tha Realest & Caliber (Dain Bramage) (2007)
- "West Coast " Tha Realest featuring Yukmouth & Lady Ice (Messy Marv Presents: Muzik Fo' Tha Taliban) (2007)
- "Certified Snitchez " Gramm Kracker featuring Yukmouth & Tha Realest (Certified Snitchez) (2007)
- "Shotcallaz " Gramm Kracker featuring Tha Realest, Spice 1 & Wacsta (Certified Snitchez) (2007)
- "Breaded Out " Gramm Kracker featuring Tha Realest & Lil' Flip (Certified Snitchez) (2007)
- "Less Than Nothin' " Jayo Felony featuring Tha Realest, Spice 1, Gramm Kracker & more (Bang Bang Mixtape) (2007)
- "Street Lyfe " C-Bo featuring Tha Realest (West Side Ryders III: The Southeast Connection) (2007)
- "Getcha Mind Right " Yukmouth featuring C-Bo, Tha Realest & Trae tha Truth (United Ghettos of America: Eye Candy) (2007)
- "Hustlin'" Yukmouth featuring Tha Realest, Sean P. & C-Bo (The City of Dope, Vol. 1) (2007)
- "Shawty Is Da Shit (Remix)" The-Dream featuring Tha Realest (Rap Or Die Vol. 3) (2007)
- "Mobsta Mobsta" Yukmouth featuring Tha Realest, Tech N9ne & The Regime (Million Dollar Moupiece) (2008)
- "Who Want It" C-Bo featuring Tha Realest & Sassy (West Side Ryders IV : World Wide Mob) (2008)
- "Playa Hatin'" Gramm Kracker featuring Tha Realest, Spice 1 & Jayo Felony (A Season In Hell) (2008)
- "Mobbed Out" Gramm Kracker featuring Tha Realest (A Season In Hell) (2008)
- "Sparkin' It Up" Gramm Kracker featuring Tha Realest, Tech N9ne, Spice 1 & more (A Season In Hell) (2008)
- "Cry 4 Me Die 4 U" Top Dogg featuring Tha Realest & Sheeba Black (Dogg Dayz) (2008)
- "Imma Kash Getta" Infamous-C featuring Tha Realest & Gangsta Boo (V.I.P.) (2009)
- "Who Eva" Infamous-C featuring Tha Realest, Naudi Shawty, Loko & Hitman Sammy Sam (V.I.P.) (2009)
- "Thug Lova" Parlay Starr featuring Tha Realest (Welcome To My World) (2010)
- "If I Die" Thug Lordz (Yukmouth & C-Bo) featuring Tha Realest & Bo-Roc (Thug Money) (2010)
- "Lost That Thought" E.D.I. Mean & Nutt-So featuring Tha Realest (Ghetto Starz: Streets to the Stage) (2015)
