= Yukmouth discography =

Discography of American rapper Yukmouth

This is the discography of American rapper Yukmouth.

== Albums ==
=== Studio albums ===
Title	Release	Peak chart positions			RIAA Certifications
Title	Release	US	US R&B	US Rap	RIAA Certifications
Thugged Out: The Albulation	1998	40	8	x	US: Gold
Thug Lord: The New Testament	2001	71	17	x	
Godzilla	2003	112	21	x	
Million Dollar Mouthpiece	2008	—	46	13	
The West Coast Don	2009	—	44	20	
Free at Last	2010	—	55	—	
The Tonite Show - Thuggin' & Mobbin'	2011	—	—	—	
Half Baked	2012	—	—	—	
GAS (Grow and Sale)	2014	—	—	—	
JJ Based on a Vill Story	2017	—	—	—	
JJ Based on a Vill Story Two	2017	—	—	—	
JJ Based on a Vill Story Three	2018	—	—	—	
"—" denotes a recording that did not chart. "x" denotes that chart did not exist at the time.

=== Collaborative albums ===
- Operation Stackola with Luniz (1995)
- Bootlegs & B-Sides with Luniz (1997)
- Lunitik Muzik with Luniz (1997)
- Block Shit with Tha Gamblaz (2001)
- Silver & Black with Luniz (2002)
- In Thugz We Trust with Thug Lordz (2004)
- I'm Good (Tha Mixtape) with Killa Klump (2006)
- Killa Thugs with Killa Klump (2006)
- The Center Of Attention with I-Rocc (2006)
- 100 Racks with Messy Marv (2006)
- Thug Lordz Trilogy with Thug Lordz (2006)
- I'm Good with Killa Klump (2006)
- Thug Money with Thug Lordz (2010)
- Cookies 'n Cream with Blanco (2012)
- The Cream Team with Chino Nino & P Hustle (2013)
- The Last Dragon with The Regime (2013)
- Dragon Gang with The Regime (2013)
- Dragon Gang (Deluxe Edition) with The Regime (2013)
- High Timez with Luniz & The Mekanix (2015)
- Dragon Dynasty with The Dragons (2014)
- No Pressure with Luniz (2018)
- Savages with J-Hood (2018)
- Double Dragon with The Gatlin (2019)
- Money Rich Regime with California Brougham (2021)
- Long Story Short with Ras Kass & Swifty McVay & MRK SX & Yukmouth, as Long Story Short (2021)
- Versace Boyz EP with 50 Racks (2024)
- Living Life with Kuzzo Fly (2024)

=== Compilation albums ===
- United Ghettos Of America (2002)
- United Ghettos Of America Vol. 2 (2004)
- Yukmouth Presents: West Coast Gangsta V.15 (2005)
- United Ghettos Of America: Eye Candy (2007)
- Greatest Hits (2008)
- 420 (2010)
- 18k The Golden Era (2013)
- 18k The Golden Era (Deluxe Edition) (2013)

=== Mixtapes ===
- All Out War (Volume 1) with The Regime (2005)
- All Out War (Volume 2) with The Regime (2005)
- How Da West Luv 50 (2005)
- In Thugs We Trust (Tha Mix Tape) with Thug Lordz (2005)
- All Out War (Volume 3) with The Regime (2006)
- Million Dollar Mixtape (2006)
- The City Of Dope (Volume 1) (2007)
- Lord Of War (2007)
- City Of Smoke (2007)
- City Of Smoke (Volume 2) (2009)

== Guest appearances ==
List of non-single guest appearances, with other performing artists, showing year released and album name
Title	Year	Artist(s)	Album
"Ice Cream Man"	1994	Dru Down	Explicit Game
"Rescue 911"	1994	Dru Down	Explicit Game
"S.E.A.G. & Yuk is Ridin'"	1997	Seagram	Souls on Ice
"Dem Niggas"	1997	3X Krazy	Stackin' Chips
"Ballin"	1997	Spice 1, MC Breed	The Black Bossalini (a.k.a. Dr. Bomb from da Bay)
"Behind the Scenes"	1997	Cool Nutz, Jiboh, Poppa LQ,	Harsh Game for the People
"In My Blood"	1998	Scarface, Big Mike, DMG	My Homies
"Big Faces"	1998	Geto Boys, Willie D, DMG, Caine	Da Good da Bad & da Ugly
"Soul Searching"	1998	Above the Law	Legends
"R U High Yet?"	1998	A-G-2-A-KE	Mil-Ticket
"Money"	1998	Gonzoe, Val Young	If I Live & Nothing Happens
"The Unexpected"	1998	57th Street Rogue Dog Villians, Big Bear, Gonzoe, Phats Bossi, Rock Money	It's On Now
"Thug & Dangerous"	1999	5th Ward Boyz	P.W.A.: The Album... Keep It Poppin'
"High Stakes"	1999	Mob Figaz, B.A.	C-Bo's Mob Figaz
"Do or Die"	1999	The Whoridas, B.A.	High Times
"Suckas Do What They Can (Real Playaz)"	1999	Spice 1, Too Short, Roger Troutman	Immortalized
"None"	1999	Big Mike, Tre'mendous	Hard to Hit
"Ain't To Be Fucked With"	1999	Certified	Certified
"I Can't Wait"	1999	Clee & Drank-A-Lot	Good Laaawd That's a Lot of Drank
"Where Da Weed At?"	1999	C-Funk, Doc Louie, Madd Maxx, Phats Bossi	Shrooms
"Senorita"	1999	The Delinquents, Mack 10	Bosses Will Be Bosses
"Thug World"	2000	Bullys Wit Fullys	Westside Stories
"Shit On You"	2000	Fatal Konnektion	Hostile Intentions
"We All Ball"	2000	Boo-Yaa T.R.I.B.E.	Mafia Lifestyle
"G'z On It"	2000	Killa Tay, Fed-X, Mac Mall	Snake Eyes
"It's War"	2000	C-Bo, Little Keek	Enemy of the State
"Spray Yourself"	2000	C-Bo	Enemy of the State
"Thugged Out"	2000	Tech N9ne, Gonzoe, Phats Bossi, Poppa L.Q.	The Worst
"Hate Factor"	2001	Mitchy Slick	Trigeration Station
"Gotta Watch My Back"	2001	Luxury Rydaz, Levitti	Be About Your Paper
"Illegal"	2001	Lethal, Papa Reu	Da Chosen Few
"Do The Math"	2001	Dorasel, Phats Bossi, Young Noble	Unleash The Beast
"Target Practice"	2001	The Jacka	The Jacka of the Mob Figaz
"How Many Licks?"	2001	Richie Rich	The Game
"Boss Up"	2001	Criminalz, Spice 1, Jayo Felony, Tray Dee	Criminal Activity
"Don't Stop"	2001	Brotha Lynch Hung, C-Bo, Spice 1	Blocc Movement
"No Underwear"	2001	Dru Down, Enemy	Pimpin' Phernelia
"I'm a Boss"	2001	Daz Dillinger & JT the Bigga Figga, C-Bo, Dru Down	Game for Sale
"Game 4 Sale"	2001	Daz Dillinger & JT the Bigga Figga, Mac Mall, Sean T	Game for Sale
"Born a Soulja"	2002	Kastro & E.D.I., Muszamil, Outlawz	Blood Brothers
"Lightz Out"	2002	Young Noble, E.D.I., Bad Azz, Lil' Zane	Noble Justice
"Uh-Huh"	2002	MC Eiht	Underground Hero
"Blaze Up The City"	2002	10sion, C-Bo, I.V.A.N. The Terrible, Outlawz	10sion
"Party Tonite"	2002	C-Bo	West Coast Mafia
"Lock Down"	2002	Outlawz, New Child, Phats Bossi	Street Warz
"Creep"	2002	C-Bo	Life as a Rider
"Pleasure of Sin"	2002	Outlawz, Big Syke	Neva Surrenda
"Boss Tycoon"	2002	Mac Dre	Thizzelle Washington
"Headhunter"	2003	DMG, G Mone	Black Roulette
"Raft of a Killa"	2003	J-Diggs	Both Sides of the Gate
"Fly Gangsta"	2003	Rydah J. Klyde	Tha Fly Gangsta
"Spitz Network"	2003	Brotha Lynch Hung, Cos	Lynch by Inch: Suicide Note
"So Fresh"	2003	C-Bo, 151	The Mobfather
"Losing Composure"	2003	Trae Tha Truth, Z-Ro	Losing Composure
"Holmedown Up"	2004	Shock G, 5th Element, Clev MC, Java	Fear of a Mixed Planet
"Merc Life"	2004	Hollow Tip	Mercenary Life
"4 Much"	2004	Mac Dre	The Game Is Thick, Vol. 2
"You Already Know"	2004	Messy Marv	DisoBAYish
"Last Man Standing"	2004	Bosko, Outlawz, Gonzoe, Phats Bossi,	That Fire
"Get It Crunk"	2005	Lil' Flip & Z-Ro	Kings of the South
"2 Of Da Realest"	2005	Young Dru	V-Town
"Respect My Gangsta"	2005	Killa Tay, Spice 1, Tiffany Wilson	Flood the Market
"Get This Money"	2005	Killa Tay, 151	Flood the Market
"Big Boy"	2005	J-Flo, C-Bo	Sick Sick Em
"Superstar"	2005	Smigg Dirtee, Chag G.	God Made Dirt
"Aaaaddddimean"	2005	J-Diggs, Keak da Sneak	California Livin' Part Two
"Neva B Right"	2005	Messy Marv, E-40, Matt Blaque, Mike Marshall	Bandannas, Tattoos & Tongue Rings
"Intro"	2005	Pretty Black a.k.a. Verstyle	Definitely Eatin', Vol. 1
"Homicide"	2005	Big Hollis, Certified	Knocks 2005: Mustard Gas
"Put Ya Ring Book On"	2005	B.A.	Sports
"Let Me Do My Thang"	2005	Mistah F.A.B., Kato	Son of a Pimp
"Lookin' At It"	2005	The Jacka, Keak da Sneak	The Jack Artist
"All We Want"	2006	Jon Nash, Lee Majors, Pretty Black	The Spokesman
"Shopping"	2006	Sleep Dank	Danker Nation
"All Night (This Is For)"	2006	Pretty Black, The Jacka	Prince of the Streets
"Get That Guac"	2006	Pretty Black, Fed-X	Prince of the Streets
"Mob"	2006	Pretty Black, Husalah	Prince of the Streets
"Mobsta's"	2006	Pretty Black, Bleu Davinci, Dru Down, J-Diggs	Prince of the Streets
"Niggaz Is Bitches"	2006	Pretty Black	Prince of the Streets
"Dribble The Ball"	2006	Gonzoe	Sex, Drugz & Hip-Hop
"Straight Up"	2006	Bullys Wit Fullys	The Infrastructure
"Ronald Dregan Intro"	2006	Y.S., Mac Dre, Swampkat	Tha Thizz Kid
"Mo Donuts"	2006	Y.S., Dru Down, Monstah Mason	Tha Thizz Kid
"Real Fly"	2006	Dru Down & Lee Majors	Cash Me Out
"Murder"	2006	Fed-X, Dru Down	Drug War
"Damn Dumb"	2006	Mistah F.A.B.	Thizz Nation, Volume 8
"My Hood"	2006	C-Bo & Killa Tay	The Moment of Truth
"Ride for a Nigga"	2006	C-Bo & Killa Tay	The Moment of Truth
"This Is My Life"	2006	C-Bo & Killa Tay	The Moment of Truth
"On the One"	2007	Messy Marv & Mitchy Slick	Messy Slick
"Stay Ballin'"	2007	Lil Flip, Big Shasta	I Need Mine
"Pushin Rocks"	2007	Bueno	The Sacramento B
"This Is For"	2007	The Jacka, Pretty Black	Shooterz
"Problems"	2007	The Jacka & Ampichino, Pretty Black	Devilz Rejectz: 36 Zipz
"Guns Will Blow"	2007	Daz Dillinger, D-Dub	Gangsta Party
"Go Dumb"	2007	Mac Dre	Pill Clinton
"Belly Dance"	2007	Haji Springer, Gennessee	Hello Buddy
"Rich & Famous"	2007	Berner & Equipto, Matt Blaque	Track Money and Pack Money
"For One Night (Luniz Reunion Song)"	2007	Numskull, J-Bo	Numworld
"X"	2007	Turf Talk	West Coast Vaccine: The Cure
"Misery"	2007	Tech N9ne, Tha Journalist	Misery Loves Kompany
"Snitchez Iz Bitchez"	2007	Macadoshis, Gold	Tha Come Up
"Stay on Top of Ur Game"	2007	Young Noble & Hussein Fatal	Thug in Thug Out
"We Does That"	2007	Arapahoe T.R.U.E.S., Tech N9ne	Eternal Flow
"Click Clack Pow"	2010	Homewrecka	On The Stove
"Doin' It"	2010	Tech N9ne, DJ Chill, OME	The Gates Mixed Plate
"Life Is A Gamble"	2012	C-Bo, Tha Realest	Orca
"Roll Dat"	2012	Young Noble, Providence & Maserati Rick	Outlaw Rydahz Vol. 1
"Till I Die"	2012	Young Noble, Suicide Ru, Hussein Fatal	Outlaw Nation
"My Way"	2013	Young Noble & Gage Gully	The Year of the Underdogz
"Big Goals"	2013	Struggle Da Preacher & St.Rap	Big Goals
"My Way"	2015	EDIDON & Nutt-So	Ghetto Starz: Streets to the Stage
"Grow Ops"	2015	OnlyOne, Illmaculate	Only + Ill
"Throw It Up Stomp"	2022	Ron Bass	
"What You See"	2023	Anthony Vex	Black Magic EP Vol. 3: Still Moving Forward
