= Big Lurch discography =

This is the discography of American rapper Big Lurch.

== Albums ==
=== Studio albums ===
- It's All Bad
  - Released: March 16, 2004
  - Label: Blackmarket Records

=== With Cosmic Slop Shop ===
- Da Family
  - Released: June 2, 1998
  - Chart positions: –

=== Mixtapes & Compilations ===
- 3XL Vol. 1
  - Released: 1999
- It's All Bad: Greatest Hits
- Already! Vol. 1
  - Released: 2012
- My Ghetto Hits
  - Released: 2013

=== As featured performer ===
- "How We Comin'" (Southern Fried Mix) - RBL Posse Ft. Big Lurch & Mystikal
- "Fire" - Mac Dre Ft. Harm & Big Lurch
- "Break 'Um Off" - C-Bo Ft. Big Lurch
- "Can I Take You Home" - Roguer Troutman II Ft. Big Lurch
- "Real Ones" - DJ U-Neek Ft. Big Bone & Big Lurch
- "How We Comin'" (West Side Mix) - RBL Posse Ft. Big Lurch & Mystikal
- "Deeper & Deeper" - T-Luni Ft. Big Lurch & Mister Spence
- "Sexuality" - Marvaless Ft. Big Lurch
- "Gimme Yo Sak" - Lil Ric & Laroo Ft. Big Lurch, Mob Figaz & Mr. Brainy
- "If You Want It" - T-Luni Ft. Big Lurch & Mister Spence
- "Thrilla" - Kali's Finest Ft. Big Lurch
- "Repercussions" - DJ U-Neek Ft. Big Lurch & Big Bone
- "Those Who Oppose" - Fatal Konnection Ft. Big Lurch
- "Bad Behavior" - Luni Coleone Ft. Big Lurch
- "Rydas" - Keak Da Sneak Ft. Big Lurch & Mondy Moe
- "Playa Shit" (Remix) - Vell Bacardi Ft. The Conscious Daughters, Big Lurch & Mac Mall
- "Sad Millionaire" - Yukmouth Ft. Phats Bossi & Big Lurch
- "Record Haters" - E-40 Ft. Big Lurch
- "Can U Deal With This" - C-Bo Ft. T-Nutty, Big Lurch, Killa Tay & Roger Troutman II
- "All Head No Body" - 187 Fac Ft. Spice 1, Big Lurch, B-Legit, V-Dal & Almond
- "Closet Nigga" - E-A-Ski Ft. Big Lurch
- "Way U Feel" - Kokane Ft. Big Lurch
- "That Feeling" - Bugzy Ft. Big Lurch
- "Somebody's Watching Me" - TQ Ft. Yukmouth & Big Lurch
- "Some Love" - Herm Lewis Ft. Big Lurch & Doonie Baby
- "Mob Life" - Certified Ft. Big Lurch
- "Dirty Game" - Tone Capone Ft. Big Lurch
- "Nigga Riches" - Big Lurch Ft. Spook Thee Man
- "No Competition" - Neva Legal Ft. Big Lurch & Chunk
- "Playa Shit" - Vicious Ft. Big Lurch
- "Paper Route" - J-Cutt Ft. Big Lurch
- "Remember Me" - RBX Ft. Sweet Lou Collins & Big Lurch
- "Could God Be A G?" - LA Nash Ft. Big Lurch
- "State Your Occupation" - Death BIV Di$honEr Ft. Big Lurch
- "Monopoly" Ft. Marvaless, C-Bo & Cosmic Slop Shop
- "Hard Labor" - C-Bo Ft. Outlawz & Big Lurch
- "God Takes Notes" - Big Lurch Ft. Spook Thee Man
