= The Best of C-Bo =

Greatest hits album by C-Bo
- Released: November 21, 1995
- Recorded: 1992–95
- Genres: West Coast hip hop, gangsta rap, G-funk
- Length: 59:23
- Label: AWOL Records
- Producers: DJ Daryl, Mike Mosley, Rodney, Sam Bostic, Skills

C-Bo chronology
Tales from the Crypt (1995)	The Best of C-Bo (1995)	One Life 2 Live (1997)

Professional ratings
Review scores
Source	Rating
Allmusic	3/5 stars

The Best of C-Bo is the first greatest hits compilation released by American rapper C-Bo. It was released November 21, 1995 on AWOL Records and features songs from C-Bo's first three albums, guest performances from other AWOL Records releases as well as rare and unreleased songs. The album features production by DJ Daryl, Mike Mosley and Sam Bostic. It peaked at number 35 on the Billboard Top R&B/Hip-Hop Albums. E-40 and B-Legit appear on the album, as well as labelmates, Marvaless and Mississippi.

== Track listing ==
1. "Intro" - 1:51
2. "Do or Die in the Hood" (featuring Mississippi) - 2:45
3. "Gas Chamber" - 4:29 (from the album Gas Chamber)
4. "Freestyle" - 4:50 (from the album Tales from the Crypt)
5. "Autopsy" - 3:54 (from the album The Autopsy)
6. "Ball Head Nut" - 3:17 (from the album Gas Chamber)
7. "Smoking Bomb" (featuring Marvaless & Rup Dog) - 3:27 (from the album Ghetto Blues)
8. "Straight Killer" - 5:28
9. "One Time Can't Stop This" - 5:09
10. "Can't Stand the Heat" (featuring Marvaless) - 5:03 (from the album Ghetto Blues)
11. "Straight Killer (Remix)" (featuring Mississippi) - 6:11 (from the album D-Shot Presents - Boss Ballin)
12. "Birds in the Kitchen (Radio Version)" (featuring E-40) - 4:23 (from the album Tales from the Crypt)
13. "American Nightmare (Radio Version)" - 4:21 (from the album The Autopsy)
14. "Living Like a Hustler" (featuring B-Legit) - 4:16

== Chart history ==
Chart (1995)	Peak position
U.S. Billboard Top R&B/Hip-Hop Albums	35
