= One Life 2 Live =

Studio album by C-Bo
- Released: February 4, 1997
- Recorded: 1995–96
- Genre: Gangsta rap; g-funk
- Length: 49:01
- Label: AWOL Records
- Producer: Freddie "T" Smith (exec.); Big Will; DJ Daryl; Mike Mosley

C-Bo chronology
The Best of C-Bo (1995)	One Life 2 Live (1997)	Til My Casket Drops (1998)

Singles from One Life 2 Live
- 1. "Club Hoppin'" Released: January 7, 1997

Professional ratings
Review scores
Source	Rating
AllMusic	3/5 stars

One Life 2 Live is the third solo studio album by American rapper C-Bo. It was released on February 4, 1997, via AWOL Records. Production was handled by DJ Daryl, Mike Mosley and Big Will, with Freddie "T" Smith serving as executive producer. It features guest appearances from Lunasicc, Maniac Lok, Marvaless, Mississippi, Big Lurch, B-Legit, Da Misses and Mac Mall.

The album peaked at number 65 on the Billboard 200 and number 12 on the Top R&B/Hip-Hop Albums in the United States. Along with a promotional single, a music video was produced for the song "Club Hoppin'", although neither performer appears in it. The song "Survival 1st" previously appeared on the 1997 No Limit Records compilation West Coast Bad Boyz II.

== Track listing ==
No.	Title	Lyrics	Producer(s)	Length
1.	"Menace"	Shawn Thomas; Jamal Rocker	Mike Mosley	0:59
2.	"3 Gangstas"	Thomas; David Stephens; Monterrio Williams	DJ Daryl	4:03
3.	"Ridin on My Bumper"	Thomas; Stephens; Williams; Lena Renae Coleman	Mike Mosley	4:19
4.	"I Can't See tha Light"	Thomas; Marva Jean Cooks	DJ Daryl	3:59
5.	"I'm a Fool"	Thomas	DJ Daryl	4:16
6.	"Living Like a Hustler, Pt. 2"	Thomas; Brandt Jones; Williams	DJ Daryl	4:18
7.	"1 Life 2 Live" (featuring Mississippi)	Thomas; Stephens; Williams	Mike Mosley	4:13
8.	"Club Hoppin'" (featuring Mississippi)	Thomas	Big Will	3:22
9.	"I'm Gonna Get Mine"	Thomas; Cooks; Williams	Mike Mosley	3:59
10.	"Break'um Off" (featuring Big Lurch)	Thomas	Mike Mosley	5:29
11.	"Kill 'Em Up" (featuring Mississippi)	Thomas	DJ Daryl	5:10
12.	"Survival 1st"	Thomas; Cooks; Williams	DJ Daryl	4:54
Total length:				49:01

The vinyl version omits tracks 3 and 11.

== Personnel ==
- Shawn "C-Bo" Thomas – lyrics, vocals
- Jamal "Mac Mall" Rocker – lyrics & vocals (track 1)
- David "Maniac Lok" Stephens – lyrics & vocals (tracks: 2, 3, 7)
- Monterio "Lunasicc" Williams – lyrics & vocals (tracks: 2, 3, 6, 7, 9, 12)
- Lena Renae "Da Misses" Coleman – lyrics & vocals (track 3)
- Marva Jean "Marvaless" Cooks – lyrics & vocals (tracks: 4, 9, 12)
- Brandt "B-Legit" Jones – lyrics & vocals (track 6)
- Tyrone "Mississippi" Gibson – vocals (tracks: 7, 8, 11)
- Antron "Big Lurch" Singleton – vocals (track 10)
- James "Flat Top" Jones – guitar (track 9)
- Mike Mosley – producer (tracks: 1, 3, 7, 9, 10), engineering & mixing (track 1)
- "DJ Daryl" Anderson – producer (tracks: 2, 4–6, 8, 11, 12)
- Big Will – producer (track 8)
- Ricardo "Rick Rock" Thomas – engineering & mixing (track 1)
- Dave "D-Wiz" Evelingham – engineering & mixing (tracks: 2–12)
- Troy B – engineering & mixing (track 8)
- Ken Lee – mastering
- Freddie "T" Smith – executive producer
- Keba Konte – photography
- Phunky Phat Graph-X – design
- Marshall "Big-V" Tubbs – marketing

== Charts ==
Chart (1997)	Peak position
US Billboard 200	65
US Top R&B/Hip-Hop Albums (Billboard)	12
