= Every Single Day =

Every Single Day may refer to:

- Every Single Day (Luni Coleone and Cool Nutz album), 2007
- Every Single Day (Lucy Kaplansky album), 2001
- Every Single Day: Complete Bonnie Pink (1995–2006)
- "Every Single Day" (Felix Sandman song), a 2018 song by Felix Sandman
- "Every Single Day" (Rob Mills song), a 2003 song by Rob Mills
- Every Single Day (band), South Korean band
- "Every Single Day", a song by Dodgy
- "Every Single Day" from Let the Love Go On
- "Every Single Day", a 2005 single from Benassi Bros. featuring Dhany
