= Desert Eagle (album) =

Studio album by C-Bo
- Released: November 19, 2002
- Genre: West Coast hip hop, gangsta rap, hardcore rap
- Length: 39:28
- Label: Warlock Records
- Producer: Femi Ojetunde, Mike Mosley

C-Bo chronology
West Coast Mafia (2002)	Desert Eagle (2002)	West Side Ryders (2003)

Desert Eagle is the eighth studio album by American rapper C-Bo, released November 19, 2002 on Warlock Records. It was produced by Femi Ojetunde & Mike Mosley.

== Track listing ==
1. "Desert Storm"
2. "Real Niggaz" (featuring Aobie & Phats Bossi)
3. "CEO Status" (featuring Cognito & D Buck)
4. "Go That for Real" (featuring Pizzo)
5. "Thug Lords" (featuring Jayo Felony & Thug Lordz)
6. "Break Bread" (featuring Frank Castle)
7. "M.O.B." (featuring Pizzo)
8. "Smoke Break (Instrumental)"
9. "What Cha Need" (featuring Aobie)
10. "Shitzofrantik" (featuring E-Loc)
11. "M.O.B." (Remix) (featuring Cognito, D Buck & Pizzo)
12. "Exhale"
