= Money to Burn (album) =

Studio album by C-Bo
- Released: August 8, 2006
- Recorded: 2004–2006
- Genres: West Coast hip hop, rap, gangsta rap
- Label: West Coast Mafia
- Producers: C-Bo (exec.), J. Mills, King James, Mike Dean, Rhythm D, Tracc Addict

C-Bo chronology
In Thugz We Trust (2004)	Money to Burn (2006)	Cali Connection (2012)

Money to Burn is the tenth studio album by American rapper C-Bo, released August 8, 2006 on West Coast Mafia Records. It peaked at number 71 on the Billboard Top R&B/Hip-Hop Albums and at number 49 on the Billboard Top Independent Albums. The album features guest performances by Outlawz, Baby Bash, Laroo, Pizzo and Marvaless.

== Track listing ==
No.	Title	Writer(s)	Length
1.	"Intro" (featuring Outlawz)	Shawn Thomas, M. Greenidge, R. Cooper, B. Washington, K. Cox	4:31
2.	"I'm Your Pusher" (featuring Pizzo)	S. Thomas	3:30
3.	"On My Toes" (featuring Baby Bash)	S. Thomas, R. R. Bryant	3:47
4.	"Left, Right" (featuring Big Zak & Eyezlow)	S. Thomas, H. James, J. Herron	4:09
5.	"Walked in tha Club" (featuring King James & Speedy)	S. Thomas, H. James	3:39
6.	"Ball 4 a Livin'" (featuring Sean P of YoungBloodZ)	S. Thomas, S. Joseph	4:20
7.	"On Top" (featuring Eyezlow)	S. Thomas, J. Herron	3:58
8.	"Danger Music" (featuring Eyezlow)	S. Thomas, J. Herron	5:17
9.	"Do tha Math" (featuring Laroo, Marvaless & Pizzo)	S. Thomas, C. Thomas	4:08
10.	"In the Trunk" (featuring 151)	S. Thomas	4:56
11.	"Same Niggaz" (featuring Domination & D-Mac)	S. Thomas, K. Richard, M. Jacob	4:18
12.	"I'm So Hood"	S. Thomas	4:27
13.	"Rep Yo' Hood" (featuring Eyezlow)	S. Thomas, J. Herron	2:35
14.	"Get It, Get It"	S. Thomas	3:33
15.	"Word"	S. Thomas	3:27

== Chart history ==
Chart (2006)	Peak position
U.S. Billboard Top Independent Albums	49
U.S. Billboard Top R&B/Hip-Hop Albums	71
