= West Coast Mafia =

Compilation album by C-Bo
- Released: July 23, 2002
- Recorded: 2002
- Genre: West Coast hip hop; gangsta rap
- Length: 1:13:17
- Label: West Coast Mafia Records
- Producer: C-Bo (exec.); Bosko; Flossy P; Mobetta; Pizzo; Rick Rock; Roger Troutman Jr.; Spade & Crash; Vonzail; Wino

C-Bo chronology
Life as a Rider (2002)	West Coast Mafia (2002)	Desert Eagle (2002)

Professional ratings
Review scores
Source	Rating
AllMusic	3/5 stars

West Coast Mafia is a compilation album by American rapper C-Bo. It was released July 23, 2002, via West Coast Mafia Records. Production was handled by Pizzo, Bosko, Spade & Crash, Flossy P, Mobetta, Rick Rock, Roger Troutman Jr., Vonzail and Wino, with C-Bo serving as executive producer. It features guest appearances from Big Lurch, Bobby Sealz, Bosko, Brotha Lynch Hung, CJ Mac, Cool Nutz, Cozmo, Crysis, E-40, Fat Tone, H60dsta Rob, Killa Tay, Lil' Cyco, Marvaless, Max Julian, Mr. Short Khop, Phats Bossi, Pizzo, Spade & Crash, Speedy, Thug Misses, Young Meek and Yukmouth. The album peaked at number 136 on the Billboard 200, number 38 on the Top R&B/Hip-Hop Albums and number 10 on the Independent Albums charts in the United States.

== Track listing ==
No.	Title	Producer(s)	Length
1.	"WC (Intro)" (featuring Spade & Crash)	Spade & Crash	0:40
2.	"Milk & Honey"	Pizzo	4:25
3.	"We Did It" (featuring Bobby Sealz & Spade)	Bryan "Wino" Dobbs	4:39
4.	"So Much Chedda" (featuring Killa Tay)	Pizzo	4:18
5.	"West Coast Mafia Gang" (featuring Cool Nutz, H60dsta Rob, Max Julian, Phats Bossi & Speedy)	Bosko	3:11
6.	"Party Tonite" (featuring Yukmouth)	Floss P	4:52
7.	"Can U Deal Wit This?" (featuring Big Lurch & Killa Tay)	Roger Troutman Jr.	5:49
8.	"Head on Freeway"	Vonzail	4:06
9.	"The Plot (Skit)" (featuring Spade & Crash)	Spade & Crash	0:56
10.	"Gee'd Up (Blocc Movement)"	Pizzo	2:54
11.	"Clean Getaway? "Surprise!" (Skit)" (featuring Spade & Crash)	Spade & Crash	0:30
12.	"U No the Rules" (featuring Bobby Sealz & Cozmo)	Floss P	4:10
13.	"Blacc Gorrillas" (featuring Lil Cyco)	Mobetta	4:07
14.	"Keep Shit Locced" (featuring Brotha Lynch Hung & Fat Tone)	Pizzo	4:34
15.	"Y'all Prankstas" (featuring CJ Mac, Cryciz & Mr. Short Khop)	Bosko	4:02
16.	"Dub C M'D Out" (featuring Marvaless, Lil Cyco, Pizzo, Thug Misses)	Rick Rock	5:27
17.	"Thugg It!" (featuring E-40, Killa Tay, Thug Misses & Bosko)	Bosko	5:14
18.	"It's Not a Game (Skit)" (featuring Spade & Crash)	Spade & Crash	0:42
19.	"I'm a Baller"	Pizzo	4:47
20.	"Rat Head" (featuring Young Meek)	Bosko	3:54
Total length:			1:13:17

== Charts ==
Chart (2002)	Peak position
US Billboard 200	136
US Top R&B/Hip-Hop Albums (Billboard)	38
US Independent Albums (Billboard)	10
