= Fearless (Marvaless album) =

Studio album by Marvaless
- Released: April 21, 1998
- Recorded: 1998
- Studio: Cosmic Slop Shop (Fairfield, CA); Bomb Shelter; Live Oaks Studio (Berkeley, CA); The Vault Studio (Fairfield, CA); AWOL Studios (Fairfield, CA)
- Genre: Hip-hop
- Length: 1:09:06
- Label: Noo Trybe; AWOL
- Producer: B.C.; DJ Daryl; D.N.A.; One Drop Scott; Pizzo; Rick Rock; Bobby G.

Marvaless chronology
Wiccked (1996)	Fearless (1998)	Ghetto Blues 2001 (2001)

Professional ratings
Review scores
Source	Rating
AllMusic	3/5 stars
XXL	S (1/5)

Fearless is the third full-length studio album by American rapper Marvaless. It was released on April 21, 1998, via AWOL/Noo Trybe Records. Recording sessions took place at Cosmic Slop Shop, The Vault Studio and AWOL Studios in Fairfield, at Bomb Shelter, and at Live Oaks Studio in Berkeley. Production was handled by Rick Rock, B.C., DJ Daryl, Pizzo, D.N.A., and One Drop Scott, with Bobby G. serving as co-producer. It features guest appearances from 151, 4C, Big Note, C-Bo, Ephriam Galloway, Killa Tay, Laroo T.H.H., Lil' Bruce, Lil Ric, Luni Coleone, Mississippi, Pizzo, Steady Mobb'n and Doonie Baby.

In the United States, the album debuted at number 43 on the Top R&B/Hip-Hop Albums and number 24 on the Heatseekers Albums charts.

== Track listing ==
No.	Title	Writer(s)	Producer(s)	Length
1.	"Fearless"	Marva Cooks	Rick Rock	3:57
2.	"Where the Weed At" (featuring Steady Mobb'n, Ephriam Galloway, Lil' Bruce and 151)	Cooks; Aaron Edmand; Billy Moore; Bruce Thurmon; Michael Corleone	DJ Daryl; Bobby G. (co.)	4:05
3.	"Eyez on the Prize" (featuring Doonie Baby)	Cooks	Rick Rock	3:35
4.	"Bitch Made Niggaz"	Cooks	B.C.; Bobby G. (co.)	4:13
5.	"What Would U Do?" (featuring 151)	Cooks; Corleone	One Drop Scott; Bobby G. (co.)	3:41
6.	"Paper Chase"	Cooks	DJ Daryl	3:06
7.	"Deadly Weapon" (featuring C-Bo)	Cooks; Shawn Thomas	B.C.	3:51
8.	"The Struggle"	Cooks	Rick Rock	3:18
9.	"Bonnie and Clyde" (featuring Killa Tay)	Cooks; Killa Tay	Rick Rock	4:43
10.	"Drama and the Lies"	Cooks	B.C.; Pizzo	3:54
11.	"Mafia Niggaz" (featuring Steady Mobb'n, Ephriam Galloway and C-Bo)	Cooks; Edmand; Moore	DJ Daryl; Bobby G. (co.)	3:57
12.	"Ghetto Tales" (featuring Laroo)	Cooks; Lawrence Dawson	Rick Rock	4:22
13.	"Nightmare"	Cooks	Rick Rock	3:18
14.	"Mob Shit" (featuring Pizzo, Killa Tay, Laroo, Lunasicc and 151)	Cooks; Dwayne Tucker; Tay; Dawson; Monterio Williams; Corleone	B.C.	4:54
15.	"Cali Players" (featuring Mississippi and Big Note)	Williams; Tay; Maurice McCarver; Tucker	DNA	4:58
16.	"Chips" (featuring Lil' Bruce)	Cooks; Thurmon	Pizzo; Bobby G. (co.)	4:32
17.	"Where U From" (featuring Laroo, 4C and Lil Ric)	Cooks; Dawson; 4C; Ritchie Fontaine	B.C.	4:42
Total length:				1:09:06

== Personnel ==
- Marva Jean "Marvaless" Cooks II – vocals
- Aaron "Crooked Eye" Edmand – vocals (tracks: 2, 11)
- Billy "Bavgate" Moore – vocals (tracks: 2, 11)
- Ephriam Galloway – vocals (tracks: 2, 11)
- "Little" Bruce Thurmon – vocals (tracks: 2, 16)
- Michael "151" Corleone – vocals (tracks: 2, 5, 14)
- Marvin "Doonie Baby" Selmon – background vocals (track 3)
- Shawn "C-Bo" Thomas – vocals (tracks: 7, 11)
- Killa Tay – vocals (tracks: 9, 14)
- Lawrence "Laroo T.H.H." Dawson – vocals (tracks: 12, 14, 17)
- Dwayne "Pizzo" Tucker – vocals (track 14), producer (tracks: 10, 16)
- Monterrio "Luni Coleone" Williams – vocals (track 14)
- Tyrone "Mississippi" Gibson – background vocals (track 15)
- Big Note – background vocals (track 15)
- 4C – vocals (track 17)
- Ritchie "Lil Ric" Fontaine – vocals (track 17)
- Ricardo "Rick Rock" Thomas – producer (tracks: 1, 3, 8, 9, 12, 13)
- "DJ Daryl" Anderson – producer (tracks: 2, 6, 11)
- Brian "B.C." Crawford – producer (tracks: 4, 7, 10, 14, 17)
- Scott "One Drop Scott" Roberts – producer (track 5), mixing (tracks: 5, 6)
- D.N.A. – producer (track 15)
- Bobby G. – co-producer (tracks: 2, 4, 5, 11, 16), editing
- D-Wiz – mixing
- Ken Lee – editing, mastering
- Freddie "T" Smith – editing, co-executive producer
- Barbara Shannon – executive producer
- Andrea Smith – co-executive producer
- Marshall Tubbs – art direction
- Marta Dias – photography

== Charts ==
Chart (1998)	Peak position
US Top R&B/Hip-Hop Albums (Billboard)	43
US Heatseekers Albums (Billboard)	24
