= Wiccked =

Studio album by Marvaless
- Released: August 6, 1996
- Studio: TML Studios (Hayward, CA); Steady Mobbin' Studios (Fairfield, CA); Live Oak Studios (Berkeley, CA)
- Genre: Hip-hop
- Label: AWOL Records
- Producer: DJ Daryl; Kevin Gardner; Mike Mosley; Rick Rock; Skills

Marvaless chronology
Ghetto Blues (1994)	Wiccked (1996)	Fearless (1998)

Professional ratings
Review scores
Source	Rating
AllMusic	2.5/5 stars

Wiccked is the second studio album by American rapper Marvaless. It was released on August 6, 1996, via AWOL Records. Recording sessions took place at TML Studios in Hayward, at Steady Mobbin Studios in Fairfield and at Live Oak Studios in Berkeley. Production was handled by DJ Daryl, Rick Rock, Skills, Kevin Gardner and Mike Mosley. It features guest appearances from Big Lurch, C-Bo, Chereen Briggs, Kollision, Levitti, Mac Mall, Mississippi, Rick Rock and The Conscious Daughters. In the United States, the album peaked at number 48 on the Top R&B/Hip-Hop Albums chart.

== Track listing ==
No.	Title	Writer(s)	Producer(s)	Length
1.	"Ride With Me" (featuring Mississippi)	Marva Cook; Mississippi	Kevin Gardner; D.J. Darryl
2.	"Wiccked"	Cook	D.J. Darryl
3.	"The Zone"	Cook	Ric Roc
4.	"Sacramento" (featuring Levitti)	Cook; Lewis King	Mike Mosley
5.	"Bring the Bomg"	Cook	Skillz
6.	"Player Shit" (featuring Mac Mall)	Cook; Jamal Rocker	D.J. Darryl
7.	"See the Light" (featuring C-Bo)	Cook; Shawn Thomas	D.J. Darryl
8.	"Stackin Riches" (featuring Kollision)	Cook; Tyme Brown; Damien Bell; Leshon Edwards	D.J. Darryl
9.	"Ride With Me (Remix)" (featuring Mississippi)	Cook; Mississippi	Kevin Gardner; D.J. Darryl; D-Wiz (co.)
10.	"Fuckin' With Pros" (featuring Conscious Daughters)	Cook; Karryl Smith; Carla Green	Ric Roc
11.	"Killa Cali"	Cook	Skillz
12.	"Sexuality" (featuring Ric Roc and Lurch)	Cook; Ricardo Thomas; Antron Singleton	Ric Roc
13.	"West Coast" (featuring Chereen Briggs)	Cook; Chereen Briggs	D.J. Darryl

== Personnel ==
- Marva "Marvaless" Cooks – main artist
- Mississippi – featured artist (tracks: 1, 9)
- Lewis "Levitti" King – featured artist (track 4)
- Jamal "Mac Mall" Rocker – featured artist (track 6)
- Shawn "C-Bo" Thomas – featured artist (track 7)
- Tyme Brown – featured artist (track 8)
- Damien "Insane Dame" Bell – featured artist (track 8)
- Leshon "Brotha Broski" Edwards – featured artist (track 8)
- Karryl "Special One" Smith – featured artist (track 10)
- Carla "C.M.G." Green – featured artist (track 10)
- Ricardo "Rick Rock" Thomas – featured artist (track 12), producer (tracks: 3, 10, 12), mixing (track 3)
- Antron "Big Lurch" Singleton – featured artist (track 12)
- Chereen Briggs – featured artist (track 13)
- Daryl L. "D.J. Darryl" Anderson – producer (tracks: 1, 2, 6–9, 13)
- Kevin Gardner – producer (tracks: 1, 9)
- Mike Mosley – producer (track 4)
- Skillz – producer (tracks: 5, 11)
- Dave "D-Wiz" Evelingham – co-producer (track 9), mixing
- Ken Lee – mastering
- Kim Collett – executive producer
- Phunky Phat Graph-X – design, layout

== Charts ==
Chart (1996)	Peak position
US Top R&B/Hip-Hop Albums (Billboard)	48
