= United Ghettos of America Vol. 2 =

Soundtrack album by Yukmouth
- Released: May 4, 2004
- Genre: Gangsta rap
- Length: 78:36
- Label: Smoke-a-Lot/Rap-a-Lot

Yukmouth chronology
Godzilla (2003)	United Ghettos of America Vol. 2 (2004)	United Ghettos of America: Eye Candy (2007)

Professional ratings
Review scores
Source	Rating
Allmusic	3/5 stars
RapReviews	(6/10)

United Ghettos of America Vol. 2 is a soundtrack to accompany the DVD documentary by the same name released by Yukmouth in 2004. The soundtrack appeared on Billboard's "Top R&B/Hip-Hop Albums" chart at number 44 in 2004.

== Track listing ==
#	Title	Performing Artist(s)	Producer(s)	Time
01	"Intro"	J-Flo	J-Flo	00:57
02	"Kill 'Em Off"	Gonzoe, Krizz Kaliko, Tech N9ne, Yukmouth	Nan Dogg	03:59
03	"Kalifornia G'z"	Crooked I, E-40, Nate Da Nut, Yukmouth	Nan Dogg	04:04
04	"We Just Wanna Thug"	Dizzle Don, N.O.R.E., Yukmouth	Amin Johnson	03:49
05	"I Love Dro"	Bun B, Nate, Yukmouth	Mike Dean	05:05
06	"Don't Be Scared"	Domination of Silverback Guerillaz	Shatek	04:21
07	"Spin & Chop"	Dru Down, Kieu, Nate Da Nut, Yukmouth	Mark Sparks	03:15
08	"What's Beef"	I-Rocc, Luni Coleone, Monsta Ganjah, Yukmouth	E-Say	03:53
09	"American Me"	C-Bo, Chino Nino, Young Noble, Yukmouth	Nan Dogg	03:24
10	"Suga Daddy"	Ms. Toi, Numskull, Nyce	Mobetta	03:52
11	"The Slide Show"	C-Bo, Nate, Richie Rich, Yukmouth	J Classic	03:22
12	"Top Shotta"	Brando, Gangsta Girl, Yukmouth	Nan Dogg	03:51
13	"Skit"	D of the Menace Clan		01:32
14	"Regime Mob"	Ampichino, Chino Nino, Nate Da Nut, Yukmouth	John Benny	05:19
15	"Stunt 211"	Silverback Guerillaz, Yukmouth	Amin Johnson	04:07
16	"On The Block"	Benjilino, Lil' Cyco, The Jacka, Yukmouth	Nan Dogg	03:59
17	"Wet Dreamz"	Yukmouth	Mike Dean	04:22
18	"Heat"	Monsta Ganjah, Planet Asia, Yukmouth	Mike Dean	04:53
19	"Get Stupid, Go Dumb"	Mac Dre, Sauce, Yukmouth	Mike Dean	04:14
20	"United Ghettos of America part 2"	151, C-Bo, Dru Down, Eastwood, Roscoe, Spice 1, Tha Realest, Yukmouth	Don Will	06:24
