= Til My Casket Drops =

Studio album by C-Bo
- Released: February 24, 1998
- Recorded: 1997–98
- Studio: TML Studios (Hayward, CA); Live Oak Studios (Berkeley, CA); The Lab (San Francisco, CA); Sick Wid' It Studio; EMI Recording Studio (Hollywood, CA); AWOL Studios (Fairfield, CA); The Mob Shop (Fairfield, CA)
- Genre: West Coast hip hop; gangsta rap; g-funk
- Length: 1:14:47
- Label: AWOL Records
- Producer: Brian Crawford; DJ Daryl; Femi Ojetunde; JT the Bigga Figga; Mike Mosley; One Drop Scott; Rick Rock; Studio Ton

C-Bo chronology
| One Life 2 Live (1997) | Til My Casket Drops (1998) | The Final Chapter (1999) |

Singles from Til My Casket Drops
- 1. "Money by the Ton" Released: January 31, 1998

Professional ratings
Review scores
| Source | Rating |
|---|---|
| AllMusic | 4/5 stars |
| Los Angeles Times | 2/4 stars |

Til My Casket Drops is the fourth studio album by American rapper C-Bo. It was released February 24, 1998, through AWOL/Noo Trybe Records. Recording sessions took place at TML Studios in Hayward, Live Oak Studios in Berkeley, The Lab in San Francisco, Sick Wid' It Studio, EMI Recording Studio in Hollywood, AWOL Studios and The Mob Shop in Fairfield. Production was handled by One Drop Scott, B.C., JT the Bigga Figga, Mike Mosley, Rick Rock, Studio Ton, DJ Daryl, Femi Ojetunde, with C-Bo serving as executive producer. It features guest appearances from 151, JT the Bigga Figga, Killa Tay, Laroo T.H.H., Lunasicc, Pizzo, Lil' Bo, Mac Mall, Marvaless, Mississippi, Outlawz, Big Syke, E-40, Spice 1, X-Raided, Big Lurch, Bobby G, and first appearance of the Mob Figaz.

The album debuted at number 41 on the Billboard 200 and number 4 on the Top R&B/Hip-Hop Albums in the United States. Along with a single, a music video was produced for the song "Money by the Ton", which peaked at No. 8 on the Bubbling Under R&B/Hip-Hop Singles chart, making it both C-Bo's and Mississippi's only charting single to date. In 2002, C-Bo reissued the album via his own independent record label West Coast Mafia Records.

== Track listing ==
| No. | Title | Producer(s) | Length |
|---|---|---|---|
| 1. | "Ride Til' We Die" (featuring 151 and Mob Figaz) | B.C. | 4:31 |
| 2. | "Deadly Game" (featuring X-Raided) | One Drop Scott | 4:55 |
| 3. | "Major Pain & Mr. Bossalini" (featuring Spice 1) | JT the Bigga Figga | 4:30 |
| 4. | "Money by the Ton" (featuring Mississippi) | DJ Daryl | 4:08 |
| 5. | "40 & C-Bo" (featuring E-40) | Rick Rock | 3:49 |
| 6. | "Hard Labor" (featuring Outlawz and Big Lurch) | Mike Mosley | 4:31 |
| 7. | "Raised in Hell" (featuring Big Syke) | Mike Mosley | 4:22 |
| 8. | "Can We All Ball" (featuring Killa Tay, JT the Bigga Figga, Bobby G and Pizzo) | JT the Bigga Figga | 3:43 |
| 9. | "Desparado Outlaws" | Femi Ojetunde | 4:31 |
| 10. | "Real Niggas" (featuring Mob Figaz) | Studio Ton | 4:31 |
| 11. | "Professional Ballers" (featuring Marvaless, Pizzo, Mac Mall, JT the Bigga Figga and Killa Tay) | Rick Rock | 4:22 |
| 12. | "Big Gangsta" (featuring Laroo T.H.H., Lil' Bo and Mob Figaz) | B.C. | 5:31 |
| 13. | "All I Ever Wanted" (featuring Lunasicc and 151) | Studio Ton | 4:37 |
| 14. | "Boo Yow!" | One Drop Scott | 3:51 |
| 15. | "No Pain, No Gain" (featuring Lunasicc and Laroo T.H.H.) | One Drop Scott | 4:38 |
| 16. | "Til My Casket Drops" | One Drop Scott | 4:12 |
| 17. | "357" | One Drop Scott | 4:05 |
| Total length: | | | 1:14:47 |

== Charts ==
| Chart (1998) | Peak position |
|---|---|
| US Billboard 200 | 41 |
| US Top R&B/Hip-Hop Albums (Billboard) | 4 |
