= Just Marvaless =

EP by Marvaless
- Released: January 24, 1995 (U.S.)
- Recorded: 1994
- Genre: Gangsta rap, West Coast hip hop
- Label: AWOL Records
- Producer: DJ Daryl, Mike Mosley

Marvaless chronology
Ghetto Blues (1994)	Just Marvaless (1995)	Wiccked (1996)

Just Marvaless is an EP by rapper Marvaless, released on January 24, 1995. It peaked at number 71 on the Billboard Top R&B/Hip-Hop Albums.

== Track listing ==
1. "Just Marvaless" — 3:20
2. "That's How We Creep" (featuring Pizzo) — 4:24
3. "Ride With Me" — 4:34
4. "Hard Core" (featuring C-Bo & Pizzo) — 4:43
5. "Jealous Bitches" — 4:17

== Personnel ==
- DJ Daryl – Producer (tracks: 2, 3, 5)
- Mike Mosley – Producer (tracks: 1, 4)
- Ken Lee – Engineer
- Tony Smith – Photography
- Phunky Phat Graph-X – Artwork, design
