= Repercussion =

Repercussion or Repercussions may refer to:

== Books ==
- Repercussions, a drumming book by John Macaluso

== Film and TV ==
- Répercussions, a 2008 French TV film directed by Caroline Huppert
- "Repercussions", a 2003 episode of Alias
- "Repercussions", a 1989 episode of The Bill
- "Repercussions", a 2002 episode of Holby City

== Music ==
- Repercussion (singing), a technique in choral singing
- Repercussions (band), a sub band of Groove Collective 1995–1997

=== Albums ===
- Re: Percussion, a 1973 album by ensemble M'Boom
- Repercussion (album), a 1982 album by The dB's
- Repercussions, a 2008 album by Distance

=== Songs ===
- "Repercussions" (song), a 2010 song by Lauryn Hill Blueberry
- "Repercussion", a song by Danny Howells as Science Department
- "Repercussions", a song by A Certain Ratio
- "Repercussions", a 2002 song by rapper X-Raided from City of Kings
- "Repercussions", a song from Big Lurch discography
- "Repercussions", a song by NAV with Young Thug from the album Emergency Tsunami

== See also ==
- Percussion (disambiguation)
