= A Million Words, a Million Dollars =

A Million Words, A Million Dollars

Studio album by Lunasicc
- Released: June 2, 1998
- Recorded: 1997–1998
- Genre: West Coast hip hop, gangsta rap, rap
- Length: 74:03
- Label: AWOL Records, Noo Trybe Records
- Producer: Andy, B.C., DJ Daryl, D-Wiz, John Silva, Killa Tay, Mike Wango, One Drop Scott, Pizzo

Lunasicc chronology
Mr. Lunasicc (1997)	A Million Words, A Million Dollars (1998)	Total Recall (2000)

A Million Words, a Million Dollars is the second studio album by American rapper Lunasicc. It was released June 2, 1998, on AWOL Records and distributed by Noo Trybe Records. The album features production from Killa Tay, DJ Daryl and One Drop Scott. It peaked at number 88 on the Billboard Top R&B/Hip-Hop Albums chart.

== Track listing ==
No.	Title	Length
1.	"Major Figgas" (featuring Killa Tay, 151, Huccabucc, Lil Ric and Marvaless)	4:35
2.	"Too Much on It" (featuring Mississippi and Ephriam Galloway)	4:37
3.	"You Created Me" (featuring 151, Killa Tay, C-Bo and Mob Figaz)	4:20
4.	"Strictly Business" (featuring Killa Tay)	5:21
5.	"Cheddar Chasin'" (featuring Killa Tay)	5:04
6.	"Wicced Intentions" (featuring Killa Tay, KJ and Lil Ric)	4:59
7.	"12:00"	4:35
8.	"A Million Words, a Million Dollars"	4:12
9.	"Gangstas Make da World Go Round" (featuring C-Bo, Steady Mobb'n and Mississippi)	4:13
10.	"Dangerous"	4:40
11.	"Can You Hang?" (featuring Agerman and Killa Tay)	5:03
12.	"Pay Style Flows" (featuring Lil Ric)	5:16
13.	"Creepin' Wit' My Mask On" (featuring Killa Tay)	4:38
14.	"True to da Game" (featuring KJ and Probable Cauze)	4:44
15.	"We Hit 'Em Up"	4:24
16.	"Bacc To Bacc" (featuring Pizzo, Laroo and Killa Tay)	3:20

== Chart history ==
Chart (1998)	Peak position
U.S. Billboard Top R&B/Hip-Hop Albums	88
