= Total Recall (Luni Coleone album) =

Studio album by Luni Coleone
- Released: March 14, 2000
- Recorded: 1999–2000
- Genre: Gangsta rap
- Length: 71:01
- Label: Ideal Music Group
- Producer: Killa Tay, Luni Coleone, Lo-Key, Hugh Heff, Big Hollis

Luni Coleone chronology
A Million Words, A Million Dollars (1998)	Total Recall (2000)	In the Mouth of Madness (2001)

Total Recall is the third album released by rapper, Luni Coleone. It was released on March 14, 2000, for the Ideal Music Group and was produced by Luni Coleone, Killa Tay, Lo-Key, Hugh Heff and Hollis. This was Luni Coleone's first album using that name, as he had used the name "Lunasicc" for his first two albums. Total Recall peaked at No. 33 on the Billboard Independent Albums chart. The album's title and cover pay homage to the film of the same name.

== Track listing ==
No.	Title	Length
1.	"Time Waits 4 No Man"	4:55
2.	"Shit Ain't Changed" (featuring Devious)	3:59
3.	"Gangsta Shit"	2:46
4.	"F.S."	4:46
5.	"Time 4 Murder" (featuring Greedy and Killa Tay)	5:02
6.	"Reincarnation"	4:27
7.	"Hundred Spokes"	5:03
8.	"Top Dollar" (featuring Agerman and Killa Tay)	5:20
9.	"Dear Mama"	5:18
10.	"Ready 4 War"	2:21
11.	"Bad Behavior"	4:32
12.	"Soldier's Story" (featuring Devious and V-12)	4:47
13.	"Do What I Do" (featuring T.A.C. and Killa Tay)	5:31
14.	"Thug Shit"	4:26
15.	"All I Wanna Do"	4:00
16.	"U Da Gangsta" (featuring Devious)	3:48
