= Percussion (disambiguation) =

Percussion may refer to:

- Percussion instrument, a large group of musical instruments that create beat and tempo.
  - Percussion idiophone, a percussion instrument which is beaten with a hand or with a dissimilar, non-sounding beater, as opposed to a concussion idiophone which is beaten against a second similar instrument
  - In the Hornbostel–Sachs classification system, percussion refers generally to any object that beats against a dissimilar, non-sounding object, so a clarinet reed is described as percussion while an oboe reed is concussion
- Percussion (medicine), a method of clinical examination
- Percussion cap, an ignition system in firearms
- Percussive foraging, a method of finding food used by the Aye-aye lemur

== See also ==
- Repercussion (disambiguation)
