= West Side Ryders =

Compilation album by C-Bo
- Released: June 10, 2003
- Recorded: 2002–2003
- Genre: West Coast hip hop, gangsta rap
- Length: 67:43
- Label: West Coast Mafia Records
- Producer: C-Bo (exec.)

C-Bo chronology
Desert Eagle (2002)	West Side Ryders (2003)	The Mobfather (2003)

West Side Ryders is a compilation album by American rapper C-Bo, released June 10, 2003, on West Coast Mafia Records.

== Track listing ==
No.	Title	Producer(s)	Length
1.	"We're Bac (Intro)" (featuring Spade & Crash)	Spade & Crash	0:20
2.	"Street Life" (featuring Phats Bossi & Killa Tay)	Bosko	3:57
3.	"We Aint F****n Wit Yall" (featuring Lil' Cyco, Ampichino & Mike P)	Rhythum D	4:14
4.	"Break Bread" (featuring Frank Castle)	Mike Mosley	3:09
5.	"Hata N***a (skit)" (featuring Nicole, Spade & Crash)	Spade & Crash	1:27
6.	"Fo My Real N****Z" (featuring Japori & Yobi)	Mike Mosley	3:47
7.	"Story to Tell" (featuring Ampichino, Beesy, Sincere & Young Ive)	Mike P	5:27
8.	"What You Need"	Mike Mosley	4:12
9.	"Smoke Break"	Mike Mosley	3:04
10.	"Gangsta Shit" (featuring Swoop G)	Lokei & Pierce	3:47
11.	"Hell on These Streets" (featuring Phats Bossi, Ampichino, Young Rob & Fetti)	Kev	5:16
12.	"We Jus Crip'n (remix)" (featuring Daz Dillinger)	Wine	4:28
13.	"Thuggin Hard" (featuring Anonymous, 151, Mack Trip & Doe)	Todd Brown	5:28
14.	"WCM Game (skit)" (featuring Spade)	Spade	0:46
15.	"Hate the Game"	Mike Mosley	4:39
16.	"Holla" (featuring Spade, Bleu Davinci & Butta Phly)	Wino	3:22
17.	"Worldwide. Mob MF" (featuring Yukmouth, Young Meek & Speedy A.K.A. Gotti Gotti)	Rhythum D	5:06
18.	"WWCM Radio"		1:23
19.	"My Life Style"	Pizzo	3:50

== Album chart positions ==
Chart (2003)	Peak position
U.S. Billboard Top Independent Albums	46
U.S. Billboard R&B Albums	32
