= Tales from the Crypt (album) =

Studio album by C-Bo
- Released: June 15, 1995
- Recorded: 1994–95
- Genre: West Coast hip hop; gangsta rap; g-funk
- Length: 43:03
- Label: AWOL Records
- Producer: Barbara Shannon (exec.); DJ Daryl; D-Wiz; Mike Mosley; Rodney; Sam Bostic; Troy-B

C-Bo chronology
The Autopsy (1994)	Tales from the Crypt (1995)	The Best of C-Bo (1995)

Singles from Tales from the Crypt
- 1. "Birds in the Kitchen" Released: August 13, 1995

Professional ratings
Review scores
Source	Rating
AllMusic	2.5/5 stars
RapReviews	8.5/10

Tales from the Crypt is the second full-length studio album by American rapper C-Bo. It was released on June 15, 1995, via AWOL Records. Production was handled by Mike Mosley, Sam Bostic, DJ Daryl, Rodney, D-Wiz and Troy-B, with Barbara Shannon serving as executive producer. It features guest appearances from Marvaless, Mississippi, Snap and Tuna Bug. The album debuted at number 99 on the Billboard 200 and number four on the Top R&B/Hip-Hop Albums chart in the United States. Along with a single, a music video was produced for the song "Birds in the Kitchen". West Coast Mafia Records, C-Bo's own label, reissued the album in 2002.

== Track listing ==
No.	Title	Writer(s)	Producer(s)	Length
1.	"Jackin' and Assassin'"		D-Wiz; Troy-B	0:08
2.	"Murder That He Ritt"	Shawn Thomas	DJ Daryl	3:51
3.	"Free Style" (featuring Mississippi)	Thomas	Rodney	5:12
4.	"Hard Core"	Thomas	Mike Mosley; Sam Bostic	3:44
5.	"Want to Be a "G""	Thomas	Mike Mosley; Sam Bostic	3:12
6.	"Stompin' in My Steel Toes" (featuring Marvaless)	Marva Jean Cooks	Rodney	4:00
7.	"Birds in the Kitchen"	Thomas	Mike Mosley; Sam Bostic	4:30
8.	"187 Dance"	Thomas	DJ Daryl	4:05
9.	"Groovin' on a Sunday" (featuring Mississippi)	Thomas; Tyrone Gibson	Mike Mosley; Sam Bostic	3:06
10.	"Who Ride" (featuring Snap)	Thomas; Snap	DJ Daryl	3:07
11.	"Take It How You Want Too" (featuring Marvaless)	Thomas; Cooks	Mike Mosley; Sam Bostic	3:58
12.	"Ain't No Sunshine" (featuring Tuna Bug)	Thomas; Tuna Bug	DJ Daryl	4:10
Total length:				43:03

== Personnel ==
- Shawn "C-Bo" Thomas – vocals (tracks: 2–5, 7–12)
- Tyrone "Mississippi" Gibson – vocals (tracks: 3, 9)
- Marva Jean "Marvaless" Cooks – vocals (tracks: 6, 11)
- Snap – vocals (track 10)
- Tuna Bug – vocals (track 10)
- Dave "D-Wiz" Evelingham – producer (track 1), mixing
- Troy B – producer (track 1)
- "DJ Daryl" Anderson – producer (tracks: 2, 8, 10, 12)
- Rodney – producer (tracks: 3, 6)
- Mike Mosley – producer (tracks: 4, 5, 7, 9, 11)
- Sam Bostic – producer (tracks: 4, 5, 7, 9, 11)
- Ken Lee – mastering (tracks: 7, 8)
- Barbara Shannon – executive producer
- Keba Konte – photography
- Phunky Phat Graph-X – design

== Charts ==
=== Weekly charts ===
Chart (1995)	Peak position
US Billboard 200	99
US Top R&B/Hip-Hop Albums (Billboard)	4

=== Year-end charts ===
Chart (1995)	Position
US Top R&B/Hip-Hop Albums (Billboard)	69
