= Cool Nutz =

American rapper

- Cool Nutz

Background information
- Also known as: Cool Nutz
- Born: Terrance Scott; May 11, 1972 (age 54); Portland, Oregon, U.S.
- Genres: West Coast hip hop, hip hop
- Occupations: MC, rapper, manager, radio personality
- Years active: 1992–present
- Label: Jus Family Records
- Website: www.facebook.com/CoolNutz

Terrance Scott (born May 11, 1972), better known by his stage name Cool Nutz, is an American rapper, radio personality, entrepreneur, tour manager and record label owner. He was born and raised in the Woodlawn, Portland, Oregon neighborhood. Growing up in Northeast Portland, he gained knowledge by the gangs and violence around him.

== Music career ==
Cool Nutz is most known for his involvement and promotion of the Portland, OR and San Francisco Bay Area hip-hop scene. He co-founded Jus Family Records in 1992 with Bosko Kante. His musical style originally used primarily G-funk synthesizer elements but has evolved to the addition of vocal and instrumental samples in his tracks.

In 1995, Scott co-founded the Portland Oregon Hip-Hop (POH-Hop) Festival. He has worked very hard to create and maintain the hip-hop scene in Portland and has worked with many rappers from the bay area, most notably "E-40" and "Yukmouth." In 1997, he signed the group G-Ism, made up of fellow Portland rappers Ray Ray and Young Randall to his label, Jus Family Records. They released their debut album, "On a Mission" in 1998, under Jus Family Records. G-Ism disbanded in 2001 following the tragic and untimely passing of Young Randall.

Cool Nutz is the radio host of the Breakout Show on KXJM JAM'N 107.5. The show airs Sunday nights from 9 p.m. to midnight.

Along with fellow Jus Family Records affiliate, Maniac Lok, Cool Nutz is featured on Track 11, "Pussy Loud," from the 2012 E-40 album The Block Brochure: Welcome to the Soil 3.

Scott managed the 2012 Group Hug Tour for Kreayshawn to promote her debut album, Somethin' 'Bout Kreay, released on Columbia Records.

== Discography ==
=== Studio albums ===
"Harsh Game for the People"

- Released: 1997
- Format: CD
- Label: Jus Family Records
- Producer: Bosko, Cool Nutz

"Speakin' Upon a Million"

- Released: 1998
- Format: CD
- Label: Jus Family Records
- Producer: Bosko, Cool Nutz

"Verbal Porn"

- Released: 2001
- Format: CD
- Label: Jus Family Records
- Producer: Bosko, Cool Nutz

"King Cool Nutz"

- Released: 2007
- Format: CD, digital download
- Label: Jus Family Records

"The Miracle"

- Released: 2009
- Format: digital download
- Label: Jus Family Records

"Incredible"

- Released: 2010
- Format: CD, digital download
- Label: Jus Family Records
- Producer: Cool Nutz, Terminill

"The Cook Up"

- Released: 2011
- Format: digital download
- Label: Jus Family Records

"Portland Ni%#a"

- Released: 2012
- Format: digital download
- Label: Jus Family Records

"Bars"

- Released: 2013
- Format: digital download
- Label: Suburban Noize Records

"Elegant Thuggin"

- Released: 2013
- Format: CD (tour exclusive), digital download
- Label: Jus Family Records

"#bruh"

- Released: 2015
- Format: digital download
- Label: Jus Family Records

"Terrance"

- Released: 2017
- Format: CD, digital download
- Label: Jus Family Records, Loyal To The Soil, 3BMMR Records

Pig Ears & Chitlins

- Released: 2018
- Format: digital download
- Label: Jus Family Records

=== Compilations ===
"Cool Nutz Presents: Collabos"

- Released: 2004
- Format: CD
- Label: Jus Family Records
- Producer: Cool Nutz

"Cool Nutz Presents: The Boardroom"

- Released: 2007
- Format: CD
- Label: Jus Family Records
- Producer: Cool Nutz

"Collabos II"

- Released: 2016
- Format: digital download
- Label: Jus Family Records
- Producer: Cool Nutz

=== Collaborations ===
"Niggaz Lyke Me" (J. Dee featuring Cool Nutz)

- Released: 1995
- Format: CD, Cassette
- Label: Illegal Records

"On a Mission" (G-Ism featuring Cool Nutz)

- Released: 1998
- Format: CD
- Label: Jus Family Records
- Producer: Cool Nutz

"My Heat Reigns Supreme" (Kenny Mack featuring Cool Nutz)

- Released: 1999
- Format: CD
- Producer: Dubb Flex

"D.B.A. Doing Business As... The Album" (D.B.A. - Cool Nutz, Bosko, and Poppa LQ)

- Released: 1999
- Format: CD
- Label: Hollywood Records/Universal Records

"Every Single Day" (Luni Coleone and Cool Nutz)

- Released: 2007
- Format: CD
- Label: Always Hustlin'/Jus Family Records

=== Singles ===
"Playervision b/w Notoz"

- Released: 1994
- Format: Cassette
- Producer: Bosko
