= The Final Chapter (C-Bo album) =

Studio album by C-Bo
- Released: March 9, 1999
- Recorded: 1998–99
- Genre: West Coast hip hop; gangsta rap; hardcore hip hop
- Length: 48:44
- Label: AWOL Records
- Producer: D-Wiz; Kirk Crumpler; T-Roy; Troy-B

C-Bo chronology
Til My Casket Drops (1998)	The Final Chapter (1999)	Enemy of the State (2000)

Professional ratings
Review scores
Source	Rating
AllMusic	2.5/5 stars

The Final Chapter is the fifth studio album by American rapper C-Bo. It was released on March 9, 1999 via AWOL Records. Production was handled by D-Wiz, Troy-B, T-Roy and Kirk Crumpler, with Freddie "T" Smith serving as executive producer. The album peaked at number 81 on the Billboard 200 and at number 20 on the Top R&B/Hip-Hop Albums charts in the United States.

The album marks C-Bo's fifth and final full-length studio release, as the rapper left AWOL Records prior to the album's release. Thus, the album is compiled from unreleased material while on the label, hence the title, The Final Chapter. On December 8, 2003, C-Bo's own independent record label West Coast Mafia Records reissued the album with two bonus tracks.

== Track listing ==
No.	Title	Length
1.	"Intro to the Final Chapter"	0:33
2.	"How Many" (featuring Lil Ric and 151)	4:24
3.	"Get the Chips" (featuring Flow and Pizzo)	4:21
4.	"Best Recognize" (featuring Probable Cauze)	4:33
5.	"Player to Player" (featuring Allie Baba and Mo-Jay)	4:26
6.	"Big Figgas" (featuring AK The Teflon Don, Kokane and 151)	5:03
7.	"Interlude"	0:49
8.	"Tru 2 da Game" (featuring J-Dubb and Lil Ric)	4:27
9.	"Still Mashin" (featuring Flow and Pizzo)	4:23
10.	"As the World Turns" (featuring AP.9, Spice 1 and Cherelle Fortier)	4:56
11.	"Mobb Deep" (featuring Laroo T.H.H. and 151)	4:16
12.	"Big Boss" (featuring Kingpins Only, Laroo T.H.H. and Raw)	4:51
13.	"My True Soldiers" (featuring Mo-Jay)	1:42
Total length:		48:44

2003 CD reissue bonus tracks
No.	Title	Length
14.	"Ball Till We Fall" (featuring Killa Tay)	5:04
15.	"Earn Respect" (featuring Revenge)	3:53
Total length:		57:43

== Charts ==
Chart (1999)	Peak position
US Billboard 200	81
US Top R&B/Hip-Hop Albums (Billboard)	20
