= Enemy of the State (album) =

Studio album by C-Bo
- Released: July 25, 2000
- Studios: Studio Prime (Seattle, WA); Cosmic Slop Shop (Sacramento, CA); Def Low Studio (San Francisco, CA); GLP Studios (San Francisco, CA); Nod Factor Studios (Missouri, TX); Hard Tyme Records
- Genres: West Coast hip hop; gangsta rap
- Length: 1:13:50
- Labels: West Coast Mafia; Warlock
- Producers: Beezie; DJ Squeeky; JT the Bigga Figga; Meko; Mike Dean; Mike Mosley; Mr. Lee; One Drop Scott; Rick Rock; Wino

C-Bo chronology
The Final Chapter (1999)	Enemy of the State (2000)	Blocc Movement (2001)

Singles from Enemy of the State
- 1. "Get The Money"/"Death Rider'z" Released: May 25, 2000

Professional ratings
Review scores
Source	Rating
AllMusic	3/5 stars

Enemy of the State is the sixth solo studio album by American rapper C-Bo. It was released July 25, 2000 through West Coast Mafia/Warlock Records, making it his first album for his own indie label, West Coast Mafia Records, after leaving AWOL Records, which he did after the release of Til My Casket Drops. Recording sessions took place at Studio Prime in Seattle, Cosmic Slop Shop in Sacramento, Def Low Studio and GLP Studios in San Francisco, Nod Factor Studios in Missouri, and Hard Tyme Records. Production was handled by Mike Dean, Mike Mosley, DJ Squeeky, Rick Rock, Wino, Beezie, JT the Bigga Figga, Meko, Mr. Lee and One Drop Scott, with C-Bo serving as executive producer. It features guest appearances from Killa Tay, Mob Figaz, Yukmouth, CJ Mac, Daz Dillinger, Dotty, JT the Bigga Figga, Lil' Keke, Too Short and WC.

The album debuted at number 91 on the Billboard 200, number 24 on the Top R&B/Hip-Hop Albums and number 2 on the Top Independent Albums in the United States. Along with a single, a music video was produced for the song "Get The Money".

== Track listing ==
No.	Title	Writer(s)	Producer(s)	Length
1.	"Enemy of the State"	Shawn Thomas; Ricardo Thomas	Rick Rock	4:46
2.	"Crippin'" (featuring Daz Dillinger)	S. Thomas; Michael George Dean	Mike Dean	5:14
3.	"Death Rider'z"	S. Thomas; Hayward Ivy	DJ Squeeky	4:08
4.	"Paper Made"	S. Thomas; Mike Mosley	Mike Mosley	3:34
5.	"Get the Money"	S. Thomas; Ivy	DJ Squeeky	3:47
6.	"9.6" (featuring Killa Tay)	S. Thomas; C. Lewis; Joseph Tom	JT the Bigga Figga	4:39
7.	"It's War" (featuring Lil' Keke and Yukmouth)	S. Thomas; Dean	Mike Dean	3:54
8.	"Forever Thugin'" (featuring Dotty)	S. Thomas; Fred Byrdwell	Beezie	3:55
9.	"Ride Til' We Die" (featuring W.C.)	S. Thomas; William Calhoun; Bryan Dobbs	Wino	3:49
10.	"Nothin' Over My G's" (featuring JT the Bigga Figga and Killa Tay)	S. Thomas; Tom; Lewis	Meko	3:49
11.	"Spray Yourself" (featuring Yukmouth)	S. Thomas; Jerold Ellis; R. Thomas	Rick Rock	4:35
12.	"C and the Mac" (featuring CJ Mac)	S. Thomas; Bryan Ross; Dobbs	Wino	3:26
13.	"Picture Me Ballin'"	S. Thomas; Dean	Mike Dean	3:19
14.	"Born Killaz" (featuring Mob Figaz)	S. Thomas; Leroy Williams	Mr. Lee	3:34
15.	"Pimpin' and Jackin'" (featuring Too $hort)	S. Thomas; Todd Shaw; Scott Roberts; B. Davis	One Drop Scott	4:19
16.	"Tycoon"	S. Thomas; Mosley	Mike Mosley	3:57
17.	"No Surrender, No Retreat" (featuring Mob Figaz)	S. Thomas; Mosley	Mike Mosley	4:20
18.	"Here We Come, Boy!"	S. Thomas; Dean	Mike Dean	4:45
Total length:				1:13:50

== Charts ==
=== Weekly charts ===
Chart (2000)	Peak position
US Billboard 200	91
US Top R&B/Hip-Hop Albums (Billboard)	24
US Top Independent Albums (Billboard)	2

=== Year-end charts ===
Chart (2000)	Position
US Top Independent Albums (Billboard)	41
