= Bonnie and Clyde (Messy Marv and Marvaless album) =

Studio album by Messy Marv and Marvaless
- Released: March 1, 2003
- Genre: Hip hop
- Label: Frisco Street Show

Bonnie and Clyde is a 2003 collaboration album by Messy Marv and Marvaless.

== Track listing ==
1. "Intro" - 0:50
2. "Waitin on You" - 4:40
3. "Real P.I." - 3:33
4. "What You Want" - 4:15
5. "I am Rap" - 4:14
6. "In the Traffic" - 3:55
7. "La Familia" - 4:42
8. "Goin Thru Some Thangs" - 4:41
9. "Off Top" - 3:35
10. "The World Is Ghetto" (Messy Marv solo) - 4:33
11. "Bitch Niggaz" (Marvaless solo) - 4:38
12. "Outro" - 0:50
13. "Don't Hate on This" (featuring San Quinn) - 4:00
