= Mr. Lunasicc =

Studio album by Lunasicc
- Released: July 8, 1997
- Recorded: 1997
- Studio: AWOL Studios; TML Studios (California)
- Genre: West Coast hip hop; gangsta rap
- Length: 1:07:42
- Label: AWOL Records
- Producer: D-Wiz; DJ Daryl; Dr. Bumpinstein; Pizzo; Skills; The Boogie Man; Troy-B; WCM

Lunasicc chronology
Mr. Lunasicc (1997)	A Million Words, a Million Dollars (1998)

Singles from Mr. Lunasicc
- 1. "Hard Times" Released: October 28, 1997

Mr. Lunasicc is the debut solo album by American rapper Lunasicc. It was released July 8, 1997, via AWOL Records. Recording sessions took place at AWOL Studios and at TML Studios in California. Production was handled by D-Wiz, DJ Daryl, Dr. Bumpinstein, Pizzo, Skills, The Boogie Man, Troy-B and WCM, with Freddie "T" Smith serving as executive producer. It features guest appearances from 151, Blacc, C-Bo, JT the Bigga Figga, Killa Tay, Laroo T.H.H., Levitti, Lil Ric, Marvaless, Pizzo, Probable Cauze, Thug Misses and Ephriam Galloway. The album debuted at number 92 on the Top R&B/Hip-Hop Albums in the United States. Its only single, "Hard Times", which peaked at No. 8 on the Bubbling Under R&B/Hip-Hop Songs chart.

== Track listing ==
No.	Title	Producer(s)	Length
1.	"The Funk Is On" (featuring C-Bo and Marvaless)	DJ Daryl; Bobby G (co.)	4:15
2.	"Gangsta Shit" (featuring Levitti, Pizzo and Lil Ric)	Skills	5:47
3.	"Consequences" (featuring Laroo T.H.H.)		5:02
4.	"Mobbin' in tha 916"		4:56
5.	"Pose No Threat" (featuring Da Misses)		4:51
6.	"Hard Times" (featuring Probable Cauze and Ephriam Galloway)	Dr. Bumpinstein; The Boogie Man	4:28
7.	"What U Ask Foe"		4:17
8.	"Mr. Lunasicc"		4:47
9.	"So Serious" (featuring Da Misses)		4:37
10.	"Hardcore Nigga"	WCM	4:17
11.	"It Don't Stop" (featuring Killa Tay and Marvaless)	Dr. Bumpinstein; The Boogie Man	5:13
12.	"Capp Pillas" (featuring Laroo T.H.H., Pizzo and Flow)	Dr. Bumpinstein; The Boogie Man	5:54
13.	"Don't Want to Funk" (featuring Blacc)		5:15
14.	"Face Reality" (featuring 151)	D-Wiz; Troy-B	4:29
15.	"Betta Get Her" (featuring Probable Cauze)	Pizzo	4:39
16.	"4 tha Bizzness" (featuring JT the Bigga Figga and Laroo T.H.H.)	Dr. Bumpinstein; The Boogie Man	4:23
Total length:			1:07:42

== Chart history ==
Chart (1997)	Peak position
US Top R&B Albums (Billboard)	92
