= Cali Connection =

Studio album by C-Bo
- Released: February 28, 2012
- Recorded: 2009–2012
- Genre: Hip hop
- Label: Ca$hville Records; West Coast Mafia Records; Black October Music

C-Bo chronology
Money to Burn (2006)	Cali Connection (2012)	Orca (2012)

Cali Connection is the 11th studio album by American rapper C-Bo, released February 28, 2012, on Ca$hville Records, West Coast Mafia Records and Black October Music. The album features guest performances by Outlawz, Young Buck, T-Nutty, 2:Eleven and more.

== Track listing ==
No.	Title	Producer(s)	Length
1.	"Gang Bang" (feat. 2Eleven)	Mike Mosley	3:23
2.	"Gun Shots" (feat. Young Buck)	Mike Mosley	4:50
3.	"Original Gangsta"	Mike Mosley	4:27
4.	"Heavy Weight"	Mike Mosley	2:58
5.	"Calling My Name" (feat. Young Buck)	Soundsmith Productions (Y-Not)	4:17
6.	"All a Nigga Knows"	Mike Mosley	3:06
7.	"Everyday" (feat. T-Nutty)	Mike Mosley	3:52
8.	"Fuck Dem Niggas"	V-TRAX of Large Money Ent.	3:48
9.	"Dedicated Hustler" (feat. Young Buck)	Mike Mosley	2:56
10.	"Loud Pack"	Mike Mosley	3:30
11.	"I'm Ballen"	Mike Mosley	2:49
12.	"Can't Break Me" (feat. The Outlawz)	Mike Mosley	3:08
13.	"Dope Man"	Mike Mosley	3:51
14.	"Smells Like"	Mike Mosley	3:18
