= Orca (C-Bo album) =

Orca: The Killer Whale of the Hood

Studio album by C-Bo
- Released: July 3, 2012
- Recorded: 2011–2012
- Genre: Hip-Hop
- Label: West Coast Mafia Records; Uneek-Music; RBC Records E1 Music

C-Bo chronology
Cali Connection (2012)	Orca: The Killer Whale of the Hood (2012)	The Mobfather II (2015)

Orca: The Killer Whale of the Hood is the 12th studio album by American rapper C-Bo, which was released on July 3, 2012, through his own imprint West Coast Mafia Records and Uneek-Music. The album features guest performances by Young Buck, WC, Yukmouth, B.G. Knocc Out, Brotha Lynch Hung, E-40, Paul Wall, Slick Pulla ( CTE) and more.

== Background ==
"187" was the first track released off the album along with the music video featuring westcoast rapper WC on May 21, 2012.

The track "Fuckin Wit It" feat. E-40 was released June 7, 2012 from the album free of charge to promote the upcoming release of the album.

On June 14 C-Bo announced via his Official Twitter account that the album release date was set for July 3 nationwide.

== Track listing ==
No.	Title	Producer(s)	Length
1.	"Orca"	Stix in the Mix	3:17
2.	"187" (featuring WC)	Tronzilla	4:19
3.	"I Hustle"	Q Made the Beat	4:10
4.	"Bullets" (featuring Slim the Mobster & King Tee)	J2	2:58
5.	"For Nothing" (featuring Dubb 20, Liq & LM)	Rob-Lo	4:04
6.	"Life Is a Gamble" (featuring Yukmouth & Tha Realest)	Hus Design, Large Money Ent.	4:00
7.	"Addictive" (featuring Slick Pulla, Brotha Lynch Hung & Dead Mike)	Scorp-Dezel	4:09
8.	"Bitch I'm Ballin" (featuring Paul Wall)	Q Made The Beat	4:12
9.	"Murder One" (featuring B.G. Knocc Out & MC Eiht)	Stix in the Mix	4:16
10.	"Getting to the Money" (featuring B-Legit)	Stix In The Mix	3:51
11.	"Waiting on Me"	Stix In The Mix	3:44
12.	"New Beginning" (featuring Marvaless, Rydah J. Klyde & T-Nutty)	Cardo	4:31
13.	"Killas Like Me" (featuring Kokane, Killa Tay & Lil Cyco)	Stix In The Mix	4:48
14.	"No Warning" (featuring Young Buck & Big O)	Scorp-Dezel	3:19
15.	"Can't Grind Forever"	King-Kong	4:08
16.	"Fuckin wit It" (featuring E-40)	Issue	3:38

iTunes Store Deluxe Edition Bonus Tracks
No.	Title	Length
17.	"Dramatic" (featuring Marvaless & Killa Tay)	4:34
18.	"Everyday" (featuring T-Nutty)	3:52
19.	"Original Gangsta"	3:41
