= Every Single Day (Luni Coleone and Cool Nutz album) =

Studio album by Luni Coleone and Cool Nutz
- Released: June 5, 2007
- Genre: Gangsta rap
- Label: Always Hustlin'/Just Family Records/RBC Video
- Producers: Bosko, Kuddie Mac, Rocafella, Syko

Luni Coleone and Cool Nutz chronology
Anger Management (2006)	Every Single Day (2007)	All We Got Is Us (2007)

Every Single Day is a collaboration album between rappers Luni Coleone and Cool Nutz, released on June 5, 2007.

== Track listing ==
1. "Every Single Day" (featuring Von OP) 5:34
2. "Go" 4:18
3. "Chippers" (featuring Rocafella) 3:52
4. "What It Do?" 4:06
5. "Skirt" (featuring Key Loom & Rocafella) 4:03
6. "There Go!" 4:07
7. "That Doe" (featuring Bosko) 4:27
8. "Like a Boss" (featuring Slim Weez) 3:46
9. "Go Dumb" (featuring Key Loom & E-Dawg) 4:20
10. "Ignant" (featuring Maniac Loc) 3:42
11. "Cop a Room" 3:59
12. "Come Get It" (featuring J. Townsend) 3:40
13. "Y'all Don't Know" (featuring Mr. D.O.G.) 3:56
14. "What" (featuring Maniac Loc) 4:41
15. "Luv for Slugs" 3:55
