= The Mobfather =

Studio album by C-Bo
- Released: July 22, 2003
- Studio: Panic Room (Hollywood, CA)
- Genre: West Coast hip hop; gangsta rap
- Length: 1:17:45
- Label: West Coast Mafia
- Producer: Blaqtoven; Bosko; JellyRoll; Mark Sparks; Mobetta; Nan Dogg; Rhythm D; Spade & Crash

C-Bo chronology
West Side Ryders (2003)	The Mobfather (2003)	Thug Lordz: In Thugz We Trust (2004)

Professional ratings
Review scores
Source	Rating
RapReviews	7.5/10

The Mobfather is the ninth studio album by American rapper C-Bo. It was released on July 22, 2003 via West Coast Mafia Records. Recording sessions took place at Panic Room in Hollywood. Production was handled by Mark Sparks, Blaqthoven, Spade & Crash, Bosko, Rhythm D, Jelly Roll, Mobetta and Nan Dogg, with C-Bo serving as executive producer. It features guest appearances from 151, Gotti, Crunch, Vitnomb, 40 Glocc, Bosko, Cyco, Eastwood, Erica Fox, Fed-X, Jobi, Killa Tay, KJ, Lil' Bo Peep, Mad Max, Nicole, Phats Bossi, Tha Realest, Thug Misses, Truck Turner, Young Meek and Yukmouth. The album debuted at number 199 on the Billboard 200, number 37 on the Top R&B/Hip-Hop Albums and number 13 on the Independent Albums in the United States.

== Track listing ==
No.	Title	Producer(s)	Length
1.	"Intro" (featuring Fed-X)	Mark Sparks	3:03
2.	"If U Don't Know About Me"	Blaqthoven	4:19
3.	"I Like Gangster Shit" (featuring Gotti and Eastwood)	Rhythm D	4:22
4.	"Hustlin'" (featuring 40 Glocc, Young Meek and Crunch)	Blaqthoven; Mark Sparks (add.)	4:04
5.	"We Come from tha Streets"	Mark Sparks	4:33
6.	"C-Bo & the Realest" (featuring Tha Realest)	Mark Sparks	3:52
7.	"Goin Hard" (featuring Killa Tay and Gotti)	Bosko	3:22
8.	"What U Want Nigga?"	Mobetta	4:00
9.	"WCM Radio A.M." (Skit)	Spade & Crash	0:28
10.	"Don't Want It" (featuring Vitnomb, Lil' Bo Peep and Thug Misses)	Mark Sparks	4:08
11.	"Know Where to Find Me" (featuring Crunch)	Blaqthoven; Mark Sparks	4:49
12.	"So Fresh" (featuring Yukmouth and 151)	Nan Dogg	5:05
13.	"I'm A..." (featuring 151)	Jelly Roll	4:37
14.	"Box U Out!" (featuring 151, KJ and Truck Turner)	Blaqthoven	4:18
15.	"WCM Radio P.M." (Skit)	Spade & Crash	0:51
16.	"I Got Mine" (featuring Vitnomb, Gotti, Phats Bossi and Mad Max)	Blaqthoven; Mark Sparks	5:09
17.	"Weekends" (featuring Bosko)	Bosko	3:51
18.	"Been Through So Much" (featuring Nicole)	Mark Sparks	4:02
19.	"Roll wit' Me" (featuring Jobi and Erica Fox)	Blaqthoven	3:42
20.	"Bitch Nigga" (Skit)	Spade & Crash	1:27
21.	"Bitch Niggaz" (featuring Lil' Cyco)	Rhythm D	3:43
Total length:			1:17:45

== Charts ==
Chart (2003)	Peak position
US Billboard 200	199
US Top R&B/Hip-Hop Albums (Billboard)	37
US Independent Albums (Billboard)	13
