= The Autopsy =

EP by C-Bo
- Released: May 19, 1994; August 12, 2003 (reissue)
- Recorded: 1993–94
- Genres: West Coast hip hop, gangsta rap, G-funk, horrorcore
- Length: 28:34; 36:17 (reissue)
- Labels: AWOL Records; West Coast Mafia (reissue)
- Producers: Barbara Shannon (exec.), Mike Mosley, Sam Bostic

C-Bo chronology
Gas Chamber (1993)	The Autopsy (1994)	Tales from the Crypt (1995)

Singles from The Autopsy
- 1. "Groovin' On a Sunday"/"America's Nightmare" Released: March 5, 1994

Professional ratings
Review scores
Source	Rating
Allmusic	2/5 stars

The Autopsy is the first EP by American rapper C-Bo, released in 1994 on AWOL Records. It was produced by Mike Mosley and Sam Bostic. It peaked at number 22 on the Billboard Top R&B/Hip-Hop Albums and at number 19 on the Billboard Top Heatseekers. One single was released, "Groovin' On a Sunday". The EP features guest performances from Keak da Sneak & Agerman, together known as Dual Committee, and AWOL Records label-mate Pizzo.

West Coast Mafia Records, C-Bo's own label, reissued The Autopsy in 2003 with bonus tracks.

== Track listing ==
1. "Autopsy" - 5:20
2. "Murder Man" (featuring Dual Committee) - 4:27
3. "America's Nightmare" - 4:42
4. "Groovin' On a Sunday" - 4:33
5. "Stompin' In My Steel Toes" (featuring Dual Committee) - 5:13
6. "Ghetto Flight" (featuring Pizzo) - 4:19

=== 2003 CD reissue bonus tracks ===
The EP was re-released August 12, 2003 with the following bonus tracks:

7. "Until We Blow" (featuring Fed-X and 151) - 3:40
8. "Boy to a Man" (featuring Mississippi) - 4:04

== Chart history ==
Chart (1994)	Peak position
U.S. Billboard Top Heatseekers	19
U.S. Billboard Top R&B/Hip-Hop Albums	22
