= Life as a Rider =

Studio album by C-Bo
- Released: January 29, 2002
- Studio: Heat Recording Studio (North Hollywood, CA)
- Genre: West Coast hip-hop; gangsta rap
- Length: 56:56
- Label: West Coast Mafia; Warlock
- Producer: Bosko; Floss P; J. Silva; Michael Angelo Saulsberry; Mike Mosley; Rhythm D.

C-Bo chronology
Blocc Movement (2001)	Life as a Rider (2002)	West Coast Mafia (2002)

Professional ratings
Review scores
Source	Rating
AllMusic	3/5 stars

Life as a Rider is the seventh solo studio album by American rapper C-Bo. It was released on January 29, 2002, via West Coast Mafia/Warlock Records. Produced by Mike Mosley, Floss P, Rhythm D, Bosko, John Silva and Michael Angelo Saulsberry, it features guest appearances from 151, Boo Kapone, CJ Mac, Don Town, Gangsta Dresta, Jamal, Killa Tay, Kokane, Lil Daddy, Outlawz, Spade, Speedy, Tray Dee, Young Meek and Yukmouth. In the United States, the album peaked at number 41 on the Top R&B/Hip-Hop Albums and number 8 on the Independent Albums charts.

== Track listing ==
No.	Title	Writer(s)	Producer(s)	Length
1.	"Cowboy" (featuring Kokane)	Jon Bon Jovi; Richie Sambora	Floss P	4:39
2.	"What U No Bout" (featuring Outlawz)	Shawn Thomas; Malcolm Greenidge; Rufus Lee Cooper III; Mutah Beale; Floss P.	Floss P	4:45
3.	"West Coast" (featuring Killa Tay, Spade and 151)	Thomas; Killa Tay; Spade; 151; Mike Mosley	Mike Mosley	5:20
4.	"I Am C-Bo (Skit)" (Crash of da Riders)			0:27
5.	"Creep" (featuring Yukmouth)	Thomas; Jerold Ellis, Jr.; Mosley	Mike Mosley	4:11
6.	"Undadawgs" (featuring Gangsta Dresta and CJ Mac)	Thomas; Andre Wicker; Bryan Ross; Mosley	Mike Mosley	3:45
7.	"Who Bangin'" (featuring Boo Capone, Jamal, Lil Daddy, Speedy a.k.a. Gotti Gotti and Young Meek)	Thomas; Jamal; Lil Daddy; Trammel Williams; Mikco Your; Mosley	Mike Mosley	3:50
8.	"If It Ain't Ruff"	Thomas; David Weldon	Rhythm 'D'	3:33
9.	"Let Me Ride" (featuring Don Twon)	Thomas; Weldon	Rhythm 'D'	3:54
10.	"Routine Check"	Thomas; Weldon	Rhythm 'D'	2:56
11.	"Who Got Flows"	Thomas; John Silva	J. Silva	3:56
12.	"Haters, Music, Hoes (Skit)" (Spade, Tish, Crash)			1:40
13.	"Don't Love These Hoes"	Thomas; Mosley	Mike Mosley	4:02
14.	"G's and Hustla's" (featuring Tre' D)	Thomas; Tracy Lamar Davis; Floss P.	Floss P	4:19
15.	"Rag Lo-Lo's"	Thomas; Michael Angelo Saulsberry	Michael Angelo Saulsberry	3:55
16.	"Outro"		Bosko	1:44
Total length:				56:56

== Charts ==
Chart (2002)	Peak position
US Top R&B/Hip-Hop Albums (Billboard)	41
US Independent Albums (Billboard)	8
