= Gas Chamber (album) =

Album by C-Bo

- Original 1993 cover for Gas Chamber

Studio album by C-Bo
- Released: April 20, 1993; January 14, 2003 (reissue)
- Recorded: 1993
- Genres: West Coast hip hop; gangsta rap; G-funk
- Length: 44:57
- Labels: AWOL Records; SMG Solar Music Group; On The Run Records
- Producers: Mike Mosley; Sam Bostic; Mob Boss Production

C-Bo chronology
Gas Chamber (1993)	The Autopsy (1994)

Singles from Gas Chamber
- 1. "Liquor Sto'"/"4-Deep" Released: February 22, 1993

Professional ratings
Review scores
Source	Rating
AllMusic	3/5 stars

Gas Chamber is the debut album by American rapper C-Bo. It was released on April 20, 1993 on AWOL Records and SMG Solar Music Group. The album was produced by Mike Mosley. The album peaked at number 53 on the Billboard Top R&B/Hip Hop Albums. A music video was produced for the song "4-Deep". A remastered version of this album, called Gas Chamber 2, was released in 2019.

== Track listing ==
1. "Black 64" - 2:15
2. "Gas Chamber" - 4:29
3. "Realer Than Real" - 3:02
4. "Danked Out" - 3:12
5. "Marked for Death" - 2:40
6. "Liquor Sto" - 3:41
7. "Scratch From" - 3:29
8. "Bald Head Nut" - 3:57
9. "Play 4G" - 4:01
10. "Survival In the Garden" - 3:09
11. "Chronic Conference" - 1:31
12. "4-Deep" - 4:38
13. "Shots Out" - 4:49

== Samples ==
Bald Head Nut

- "Jungle Boogie" by Kool & the Gang

Liquor Sto

- "You Made a Change in My Life" by Bar-Kays

Marked for Death

- "Hip Dip Skippedabeat" by Mtume

Play 4G

- "Five Minutes of Funk" by Whodini

Realer Than Real

- "Nuthin' but a 'G' Thang" by Dr. Dre

Survival in the Garden

- "The Message" by Grandmaster Flash and The Furious Five

== Charts ==
Chart performance for Gas Chamber
Chart (1993)	Peak position
US Top R&B/Hip-Hop Albums (Billboard)	53
