= Tru 'Dat' Entertainment =

- Founded: 2006
- Founder: Hysear Randell
- Distributor: Independent
- Genre: Hip hop
- Country of origin: United States

Tru 'Dat' Entertainment (also variated as Tru 'dat' Entertainment, Trudat Entertainment and TRU DAT Entertainment) or plainly Tru Dat was a Los Angeles, California-based firm founded in 2006 by Hysear Randell, a wealthy African-American entrepreneur, as a recruitment platform for urban talent in music, sport, film and fashion. Tru 'Dat' Entertainment also aimed to aid the poor by providing them with opportunities for recruitment at one of their establishments. The company was still in its first stages of development so their rosters were not lengthy.

== History ==
=== Music ===
Tru 'Dat' Entertainment was based as a junior record label with hopes of establishing a lengthy roster of talented artists in the genre of hip hop. Tru Dat signed former Death Row Records artist, Tha Realest, and also employed Bosko, a talented young producer. Tha Realest released his first music video for his intended debut single, "Eurry Now And Then", on the label, which was also set to distribute Tha Realest's upcoming debut album, Witness Tha Realest, in early 2007.

Former Death Row Records Security Head Reggie Wright Junior, recently quoted as saying he could have run Death Row better than Suge Knight, was on board as part of Tru Dat.

=== Last known roster ===
- Tha Realest
- Bosko

=== Other ventures ===
Tru 'Dat' Entertainment worked as a project company for urban-style films. Tru Dat worked on the production of Waist Deep, a 2006 film about a father, whose son is kidnapped by members of a criminal organization, must collect a ransom amount of $100,000 by taking on a criminal persona. Tru Dat's production of the film was successful through various affiliates and subsidiaries, such as Tycoon International Holdings and Radar Pictures.

Tru 'Dat' Entertainment was working on other film projects including PITBULL and Ear 2 Da Street which were due for release in late 2007 to early 2008.

Tru 'Dat' Entertainment was working on establishing an urban clothing brand. The line of clothing was aimed at footwear fashion and hip-hop style clothing.

Tru 'Dat' Entertainment established a subsidiary for sports. This way, Tru 'Dat' Entertainment focused on promoting boxing matches and skilled boxers. Tru Dat was determined to recruit youth and train them to become tough competitive boxers, who in turn will shape the structure of the Tru Dat industry.

=== Tax-scam controversy ===
On April 28, 2007, an arrest warrant was issued for Hysear Don Randell. According to The Denver Post and Rocky Mountain News, Hysear's girlfriend Michelle Cawthra, a revenue supervisor at the Department of Revenue in Denver, authorized phony tax returns to Randell and Holliday by forging former Revenue Department employees' signatures. Sources say that she transferred approximately $5.3 million ($5,327,278) with a total estimate of $8 million to bank accounts held by Randell. Randell was arrested on May 2, 2007 and held, along with Cawthra and Holliday, in Arapahoe County jail on $10 million bail.

Andre Holliday was released on lack of evidence of involvement in the scheme but Cawthra was charged with 27 counts of racketeering, theft and forgery (violating the Colorado Organized Crime Control Act, conspiracy to commit computer crime, conspiracy to commit theft, and 18 counts of forgery, embezzlement of public property, theft and conspiracy to commit embezzlement of public property).

Following the incident, in 2008, it was alleged that Tru Dat had officially been discontinued. Its back catalogs were sold to Rapp Records.
