= Cosmic Slop Shop =

American hip hop group

- Doonie Baby, Big Lurch and Rick Rock

Background information
- Origin: Oakland, California, U.S.
- Genre: Gangsta rap
- Years active: 1996–1999
- Labels: MCA; Mtume Music Group
- Past members: Big Lurch; Doonie Baby; Rick Rock

Cosmic Slop Shop was an American hip hop group from Oakland, California. The group was composed of Antron "Big Lurch" Singleton, Marvin "Doonie Baby" Selmon and Ricardo "Rick Rock" Thomas. Their single "Sinful" from their only studio album Da Family was a minor hit in 1998, which peaked at #66 on the Billboard Hot R&B/Hip-Hop Songs chart and #18 on the Hot Rap Songs chart in the US.

== History ==
Doonie Baby, Big Lurch and Rick Rock met at Slop Shop Studios in the San Francisco Bay Area and formed Cosmic Slop Shop, condensing the studio's name with Cosmic Slop, the 1973 album by Funkadelic. The group released their debut album Da Family in 1998 through MCA Records but, disappointed that it wasn't more successful, disbanded without recording a second album.

Rick Rock continued to produce, and, in 2002, he and Doonie Baby formed The Federation with rappers Stressmatic and Goldie Gold. In 2002, Big Lurch was convicted of murder for killing and cannibalizing his female roommate. Attorneys for the rapper claimed the rapper was suffering the effects of PCP smoked the night before. Antron "Big Lurch" Singleton was sentenced to life in prison in 2003.

== Discography ==
=== Studio albums ===
- Da Family (1998)

=== Singles ===
- "Da Family" (1997)
- "Sinful" (1998)
