= Witness Tha Realest =

Studio album by Tha Realest
- Released: July 14, 2009
- Recorded: 2004–2009
- Genre: Gangsta rap
- Length: 60:12
- Label: RBC Records/Team Dime Entertainment
- Producer: Jevon Jones

Professional ratings
Review scores
Source	Rating
HipHopDX	2/5 stars

Witness Tha Realest is the debut album by rapper Tha Realest. The album was released on July 14, 2009 by RBC Records/Team Dime Entertainment and distributed by E1 Music (formerly Koch Records). Witness tha Realest' was delayed on several occasions due to the lack of a record distributor and the dissolution of Tru 'Dat' Entertainment.

== Background ==
The Realest planned to release his debut album as early as 2004 but due to the lack of a distributing company, the album's release was delayed. Witness Tha Realest would again be scheduled for release, this time in 2007, as Tha Realest had been signed on to Tru 'Dat' Entertainment in 2006. This date was further pushed back following the bankruptcy of the label after the owner, Hysear Randell, was found guilty of embezzling millions of dollars. In late 2007, Tha Realest was signed to Team Dime Entertainment, the label on which the album was released in partnership with RBC and KOCH Records.

== Track listing ==
No.	Title	Producer(s)	Length
1.	"Kuz It Juss Ain't N U"	Swiff 1500	5:11
2.	"Witness Tha Realest" (featuring Fat Joe)	Blaqthoven	4:52
3.	"N Luv Wit Ah Ghetto Gurl" (featuring J. Valentine)	Swiff 1500	3:54
4.	"Grown Ass Man" (featuring C-Bo)	Blaqthoven	4:19
5.	"That'z Juss Lyfe" (featuring Crooked I & Val Young)	Mark Sparks	4:50
6.	"Peep'N Game" (featuring Ray J)	The Underdogs	3:52
7.	"Memory Lane" (featuring Dyson)	E. Poppi	4:14
8.	"Sumthin Like a Pimp" (featuring Sean P & Devin the Dude)	DJ Domo	4:19
9.	"When Ya Time Iz Up"	Alif	4:13
10.	"Ice Kold" (featuring E.D.I. Mean)	Marvin Paige	4:47
11.	"Number 1 Hoe"	The Underdogs	4:14
12.	"Mind of Ah Madman" (featuring Yukmouth & WC)	Marvin Paige	4:48
13.	"Do What It Do" (featuring Dyson)	Alif	3:48
14.	"Get It N"	Detail	4:04
15.	"Y I Keep My Burna On Me"		4:17
16.	"Tha Good Lyfe"	Eric Reese	4:14
17.	"All Or Nothin'" (featuring 7)	Mel-Man	2:59
