= Godzilla (Yukmouth album) =

Studio album by Yukmouth
- Released: July 22, 2003
- Recorded: 2002–03
- Studios: Smoke House Studios (North Hollywood, CA); Dean's List House of Hits (Houston, TX); Noddfactor Studios (Houston, TX)
- Genres: West Coast hip hop; gangsta rap; hardcore hip hop
- Length: 1:15:44
- Label: Rap-A-Lot 4 Life
- Producers: J. Prince (exec.); Arch Bishop Storm; C. Notes; Dame Grease; G-Casso; Joseph "JoJo" Hearne; Mike D.; Mike Dean; Mr. Lee; Mr. Mixx; Nan Dogg

Yukmouth chronology
Thug Lord: The New Testament (2001)	Godzilla (2003)	In Thugz We Trust (2004)

Professional ratings
Review scores
Source	Rating
RapReviews	7.5/10

Godzilla is the third solo studio album by American rapper Yukmouth. It was released on July 22, 2003 via Rap-A-Lot 4 Life. Recording sessions took place at Smoke House Studios in North Hollywood, and at Dean's List House of Hits and Noddfactor Studios in Houston. Production was handled by Nan Dogg, Dame Grease, Mike D., Mike Dean, Arch Bishop Storm, C. Notes, G-Casso, Joseph "JoJo" Hearne, Mr. Lee and Mr. Mixx, with J. Prince serving as executive producer. The album peaked at number 112 on the Billboard 200 and number 21 on the Top R&B/Hip-Hop Albums in the United States.

== Track listing ==
No.	Title	Writer(s)	Producer(s)	Length
1.	"Godzilla"	Jerold Ellis; Joseph Hearne	Joseph "Jo Jo" Hearne	4:32
2.	"Money & Power"	Ellis; Michael Dinkens	Mike Dean	4:35
3.	"Nothin 2 a Bo$$" (featuring Benjilino)	Ellis; Damon Blackman	Dame Grease	4:01
4.	"Regime Mobstaz" (featuring The Regime)	Ellis; Fernando Ayon	Nan Dogg	6:08
5.	"Stuntastic"	Ellis; Blackman	Dame Grease	3:41
6.	"Pimp da Bitch" (featuring Dru Down, B-Legit and Deidre Selene)	Ellis; Darnel Robinson; Brandt Jones; Ayon	Nan Dogg	3:48
7.	"Do My Thang" (featuring Val Young, Kurupt and Roscoe)	Ellis; Ricardo Brown; David Brown; Ayon	Nan Dogg	4:11
8.	"Kidnap U" (featuring Nyce and Who'z Who)	Ellis; B. Taoipu	G-Casso	3:40
9.	"Somebody Gone Die 2 Nite" (featuring Tech N9ne, Hussein Fatal, Tha Realest and Benjilino)	Ellis; Bruce Washington; Ayon	Nan Dogg	4:39
10.	"Ya Boy" (featuring Devin the Dude and Ampichino)	Ellis; Devin Copeland; Michael Dean	Mike Dean	4:20
11.	"I Want Ya Body" (featuring Aaron Hall)	Ellis; Jimmy Singletary	Arch Bishop Storm	4:00
12.	"Thug Lordz" (featuring C-Bo)	Ellis; Shawn Thomas; Dinkens	Mike Dean	3:09
13.	"Be Easy" (featuring Ray J and Gangsta Girl)	Ellis; William Raymond Norwood	C. Notes	3:41
14.	"What It Do" (featuring E-Rock and Bun B)	Ellis; Bernard Freeman; David Hobbs	Mr. Mixx	4:55
15.	"Go Hard" (featuring The Fleet and Ampichino)	Ellis; Leroy Williams	Mr. Lee	6:00
16.	"Do It B.I."	Ellis; Blackman	Dame Grease	3:39
17.	"Model Chickz"	Ellis; Ayon	Nan Dogg	2:35
18.	"Hard Tymez" (featuring Z-Ro, Trae and Tanya Herron)	Ellis; Joseph McVey; Tanya Herron; Dean	Mike Dean	4:10
Total length:				1:15:44

== Charts ==
Chart (2003)	Peak position
US Billboard 200	112
US Top R&B/Hip-Hop Albums (Billboard)	21
