= Ghetto Blues =

Album by Marvaless

Studio album by Marvaless
- Released: Jun 30, 1994 (U.S.)
- Recorded: 1993−1994
- Genre: Gangsta rap, West Coast hip hop
- Label: AWOL Records
- Producer: DJ Daryl, Xtra Large

Marvaless chronology
Ghetto Blues (1994)	Just Marvaless (1995)

Ghetto Blues is the debut studio album by rapper Marvaless, released on June 30, 1994. It peaked at number 100 on the Billboard Top R&B/Hip-Hop Albums.

== Track listing ==
1. "Ghetto Blues" — 4:48
2. "Niggas & Hoes" (featuring Pizzo) — 5:01
3. "Smokin' Da Bomb" (featuring C-Bo, Rup Dog, & Thomas) — 5:07
4. "It's About Time" — 3:23
5. "Kill the Disrespect" — 3:48
6. "Can't Stand the Heat" (featuring C-Bo & Thomas) — 5:25
7. "Don't Cross Me" — 4:22
8. "Another Dead Nigga" — 3:32
9. "Female Assassin" — 4:49
10. "Shouts Out" — 5:54

== Personnel ==
- C-Bo – Composer
- DJ Daryl – Producer
- Big Hollis - Producer
- Keba Konte – Photography
- Marvaless – Composer
- Rup Dog – Composer
- Xtra Large – Producer
