= C-Bo =

American rapper (born 1972)

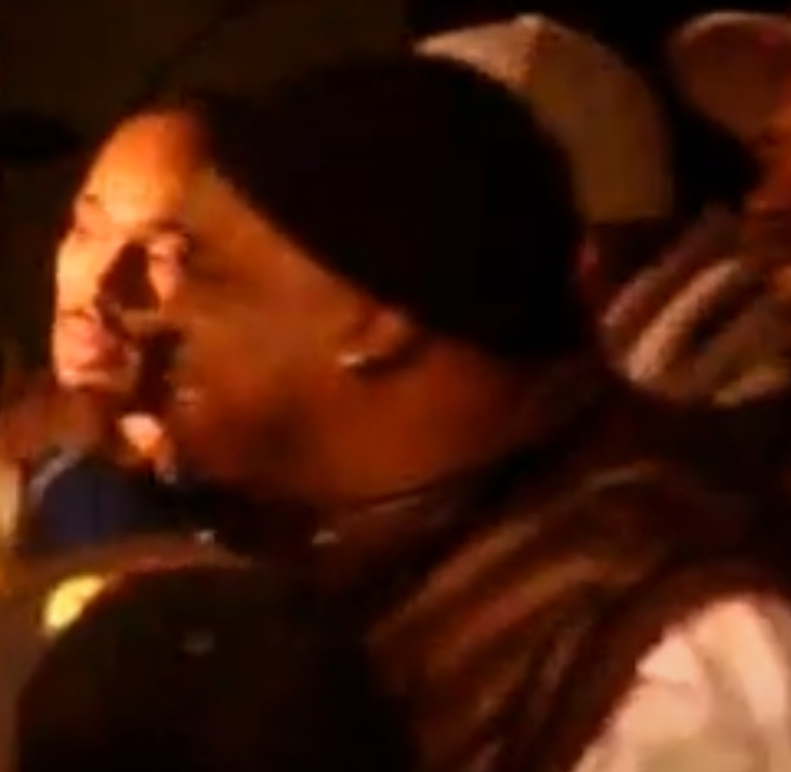
- C-Bo in 2011

Background information
- Born: Shawn Thomas; January 14, 1972 (age 53); Waco, Texas, US
- Origin: Meadowview, Sacramento, California, US
- Genre: Gangsta rap
- Occupations: Rapper; record producer
- Years active: 1991–present
- Labels: Noo Trybe; Warlock; Virgin; EMI; West Coast Mafia; Ca$hville

Shawn Thomas (born January 14, 1972), better known by his stage name C-Bo, is an American rapper from Sacramento, California. Known for his extensive legal troubles, he was the first notable rapper to be jailed due to his lyrical content in 1998. His 1995 song, "Deadly Game" (with X-Raided) earned this distinction, as its lyrics were a scathing critique of political officials, including governor Pete Wilson, and California's Prop. 184 three-strikes law. He ineffectively argued for appeal three times.

Although some charges were dropped as it was viewed as a violation of his First Amendment rights, he was arrested in California in 1998, under the suspicion that his violent rap lyrics violated his parole. He rapped his court statement to the presiding judge, in Ohio, who gave C-Bo probation on the condition that he also rap in a Public Service Announcement. Also known for his frequent collaborations with fellow California-based rappers, he appeared in numerous videos for Tupac Shakur.

== Early life ==
Thomas was raised in a single family home with three brothers and five sisters. During that time he became a member of the Garden Blocc Crips.

== Music career ==
In a 1995 interview with Rap Pages, DJ Screw named C-Bo as his "favorite artist of all time".

== Legal issues ==
Since the age of 10 Thomas spent nearly half of his life in and out of incarceration, entering the criminal justice system at age 14, being arrested 40-50 times spending time at Soledad State Prison, Folsom State Prison, and Deuel Vocational Institution.

During a 1993 music video shoot, Thomas fired a shot in the air to get people's attention and stop a potential gang situation. Instead it made matters worse, confusing the crowd and causing more shots to ring off. His friend Kean Miller was killed at age 23 during the act.

In a 1996 incident Thomas was sentenced to 15 months in jail. A firearm used by him caused a death of one man during a rival gang confrontation.

In March 1998, he was sentenced to two more months in prison in Sacramento, after testing positive for marijuana which violated the terms of his probation.

In August 2017, during the filming of a music video, a shootout occurred leaving 1 dead and 4 injured. This came after rapper Mozzy and Thomas had exchanged diss tracks during the same month.

== Personal life ==
Thomas is married with 3 children, he enjoys skiing, camping and fishing.

== Discography ==
=== Singles ===
Title	Year	Featured artist(s)	Producer	Album / Label notes	
"OT Trips"	2022	—	Brit on the Beat	non-album single	
"The Hustler"	2022	—	Brit on the Beat	non-album single	
"Mo Money"	2022	—	Brit on the Beat	non-album single	
"Let's Ride"	2022	Kafeeno	Brit on the Beat	non-album single	
"Trapped"	2023	—	Brit on the Beat	non-album single	
"I Am American"	2025	—	Brit on the Beat		
"Soldier"	2025	C-Bo & X-Raided	Brit on the Beat		Strange Music / Virgin Music Group

=== Studio albums ===
Title	Release	Peak chart positions	
Title	Release	US	US R&B
Gas Chamber	1993	—	53
Tales from the Crypt	1995	99	4
One Life 2 Live	1997	65	12
Til My Casket Drops	1998	41	4
The Final Chapter	1999	81	20
Enemy of the State	2000	91	24
Life as a Rider	2002	—	41
Desert Eagle	2002	—	—
The Mobfather	2003	199	37
Money to Burn	2006	—	71
Cali Connection	2012	—	—
Orca	2012	—	—
The Mobfather II	2015	—	—
The Problem	2017	—	—
Animal	2019	—	—

=== Collaborative albums ===
- Blocc Movement (with Brotha Lynch Hung) (2001)
- Gang Affiliated (with West Coast Mafia Gang) (2004)
- In Thugz We Trust (with Thug Lordz) (2004)
- 100 Racks In My Backpack (with San Quinn) (2006)
- Thug Lordz Trilogy (with Thug Lordz) (2006)
- The Moment of Truth (with Killa Tay) (2006)
- Tradin' War Stories (with Omar "Big-O" Gooding) (2008)
- Thug Money (with Thug Lordz) (2010)

=== Compilation albums ===
- The Best of C-Bo (1995)
- C-Bo's Best Appearances '91-'99 (2001)
- West Coast Mafia (2002)
- West Side Ryders (2003)
- C-Bo's Lost Sessions (2004)
- West Side Ryders II (2005)
- Best of the Girth (2005)
- The Greatest Hits (2005)
- West Side Ryders III (2007)
- West Coast Classics (2007)
- C-Bo's Bulletproof (2007)
- West Side Ryders IV: World Wide Mob (2008)
- West Side Ryders V (2011)
- C-Bo Trilogy (2012)
- OG Chronicles (2014)
- Mobfather: The John Gotti Pack (2018)

=== Mixtapes ===
- Underground & Unreleased with West Coast Mafia Gang (2004)
- West Coast Durty with Lil' Flip (2004)
- The Money to Burn Mixtape (2006)
- Cashville Takeover with Cashville Records (2009)
- West Coast Mafia Music (2010)
- I Am Gangsta Rap (2013)

=== Extended plays ===
Title	Release	Peak chart positions	
Title	Release	US	US R&B
The Autopsy	1994	—	22

=== Guest appearances ===
Title	Year	Other artist(s)	Album
"Smokin' Da Bomb"	1994	Marvaless, Rup Dog	Ghetto Blues
"Can't Stand the Heat"	1994	Marvaless	Ghetto Blues
"Hard Core"	1995	Marvaless, Pizzo	Just Marvaless
"That's How We Break Bread"	1995	TRU	True
"Tradin' War Stories"	1996	2Pac, Outlawz	All Eyez on Me
"Ain't Hard 2 Find"	1996	2Pac, B-Legit, D-Shot, E-40, Richie Rich	All Eyez on Me
"Code Red"	1996	Marv Mitch & LeMay	Livin In Tha Strange
"See the Light"	1996	Marvaless	Wiccked
"Gotta Buy Your Dope from Us"	1996	B-Legit, Little Bruce	The Hemp Museum
"Niggaz Get They Wig Split"	1996	B-Legit, Celly Cel	The Hemp Museum
"Major Factorz"	1997	JT the Bigga Figga, Young Meek	Game Tight
"The Funk Is On"	1997	Lunasicc, Marvaless	Mr. Lunasicc
"It's on, on Sight"	1998	E-40	The Element of Surprise
"Ride"	1998	Celly Cel	The G Filez
"Deadly Weapon"	1998	Marvaless	Fearless
"Mafia Niggaz"	1998	Marvaless, Steady Mobb'n	Fearless
"Over Drive"	1998	Lunasicc, 151, Killa Tay, Mob Figaz	A Million Words, a Million Dollars
"Big Dawgs"	1998	Killa Tay, J-Dubb, O-Fed	Mr. Mafioso
"Thug Money"	1998	Guce	If It Ain't Real, It Ain't Official
"Mob"	1999	Kokane	They Call Me Mr. Kane
"Armaggedon"	1999	Mob Figaz	C-Bo's Mob Figaz
"Fastlane"	1999	Mob Figaz	C-Bo's Mob Figaz
"Mafioso Type"	1999	Mob Figaz	C-Bo's Mob Figaz
"No Money"	1999	Mob Figaz, Huccabucc, Kaos	C-Bo's Mob Figaz
"Prepare to Die"	1999	Mob Figaz, Huccabucc, Young Meek	C-Bo's Mob Figaz
"Thug World"	1999	Mob Figaz, Spice 1	C-Bo's Mob Figaz
"Cause I Can"	1999	E-40, Jayo Felony	Charlie Hustle: The Blueprint of a Self-Made Millionaire
"Flossed Out"	1999	Mike Mosley, Emidy, Official London Breezy, Will	Platinum Plaques
"Kaviealstars"	1999	3X Krazy, Otis & Shug	Immortalized
"Thug Disease"	1999	South Central Cartel, Spice 1	Concrete Jungle Vol. 1
"The World Keeps Turnin'"	1999	Pizzo	Heater Calhoun
"Straight G'z"	1999	Pizzo	Heater Calhoun
"Hard Ball?"	2000	Killa Tay	Snake Eyes
"The Murda Show"	2000	Killa Tay	Snake Eyes
"Whoo Ride"	2000	Killa Tay	Thug Thisle
"One Luv"	2000	Spice 1	The Last Dance
"Ride 4 Me"	2000	Spice 1, Rod-Dee	The Playa Rich Project
"Block Monsters"	2000	Mac Mall, JT the Bigga Figga	Beware of Those
"Do It Right"	2001	Yukmouth, Phats Bossi	Thug Lord: The New Testament
"Smile"	2001	Yukmouth, CJ Mac	Thug Lord: The New Testament
"Paper Made"	2001	Big Hollis	Knocks 2001
"I'm a Boss"	2001	Daz Dillinger, JT the Bigga Figga, Yukmouth, Dru Down	Game for Sale
"Crippin'"	2001	Daz Dillinger	Who Ride wit Us: Tha Compalation, Vol. 1
"Blaze Up the City"	2002	10sion, I.V.A.N. The Terrible, Outlawz	10sion
"What!"	2002	Messy Marv	Turf Politics
"Fuck You"	2002	Luniz	Silver & Black
"Smack Yo Self"	2002	Young Noble, Hellraza	Street Warz
"Deadly Game"	2002	X-Raided	Deadly Game
"Thug Lordz"	2003	Yukmouth	Godzilla
"Nothing Over My G'z"	2003	JT the Bigga Figga, Killa Tay	Game Tight Vol. 2
"Countin' Money"	2003	JT the Bigga Figga, Killa Tay, Mac Mall, Marvaless, Pizzo	Game Tight Vol. 2
"Can We Ball?"	2003	JT the Bigga Figga, Killa Tay	Game Tight Vol. 2
"Can U Deal With This?"	2004	Big Lurch, Killa Tay	It's All Bad
"Sav Boyz"	2004	San Quinn, Killa Tay	I Give You My Word
"American Me"	2004	Yukmouth, Chino Nino, Young Noble	United Ghettos of America Vol. 2
"The Slide Show"	2004	Yukmouth, Nate, Richie Rich	United Ghettos of America Vol. 2
"United Ghettos of America part 2"	2004	Yukmouth, 151, Dru Down, Eastwood, Roscoe, Spice 1, Tha Realest	United Ghettos of America Vol. 2
"Big Boy"	2005	J-Flo, Yukmouth	Sick Sick Em
"Leave the Ridin' to Us"	2005	Spice 1, Yukmouth	The Truth
"Ghetto Slums"	2005	JT the Bigga Figga, Phats Bossi	Neighborhood Supastarz
"Gangstas' & Ballas"	2007	Young Bleed	Once Upon a Time in Amedica
"West Side"	2008	Yukmouth, Glasses Malone	Million Dollar Mouthpiece
"Thuggin Till I Die"	2008	Outlawz	We Want In: The Street LP
"Grown Ass Man"	2009	Tha Realest	Witness Tha Realest
"Stay on It"	2009	Yukmouth	The West Coast Don
"Fast Quarter"	2011	E-40, Yukmouth	Revenue Retrievin': Graveyard Shift
"On My Side"	2011	The Jacka, Smigg Dirtee	Flight Risk
"Like Us"	2011	Pimp C, Smoke D, Vicious	Still Pimping
"Hittin' a Lick"	2012	E-40, T-Nutty	The Block Brochure: Welcome to the Soil 2
"Blowin on Jamaica"	2012	Yukmouth, Young Noble	Half Baked
"Put Da Clip In"	2013	Young Noble, Young Buck	Outlaw Nation Vol. 2
"Salute the West"	2013	Westcoast Stone, Killa Tay, Kokane, Wratchet Wrico	Salute The West
"Real 1's"	2013	Sean T, Meccah Dawn	—N/a
"Choppa on Deck"	2014	Yukmouth, Young Buck	GAS (Grow & Sale)
"Real Life"	2014	Philthy Rich, M Dot 80	A~1 Since Day One
"Life of a Rider"	2015	Lil Mo, Beast, Matt Black	
"Bomb First"	2024	Matteocci Tha Don	Single
"Made a Man of Me"	2024	EDIDON, June Summers, Nutt-So	The Hope Dealer, Pt. 1
