= In Thugz We Trust =

Studio album by Thug Lordz
- Released: March 30, 2004
- Genre: Hip hop
- Length: 55:07
- Labels: West Coast Mafia, Smoke-A-Lot
- Producers: Bosko, C-Bo (exec.), E-A-Ski & CMT, J-Classic, Mark Sparks, Mo'Betta, Nan-Dog, Raw Steel, Rhythm D, Yukmouth (exec.)

Thug Lordz chronology
| In Thugz We Trust (2004) | Thug Lordz Trilogy (2006) |

C-Bo chronology
| The Mobfather (2003) | In Thugz We Trust (2004) | Money to Burn (2006) |

Yukmouth chronology
| Godzilla (2003) | In Thugz We Trust (2004) | Million Dollar Mouthpiece (2008) |

Professional ratings
Review scores
| Source | Rating |
|---|---|
| Allmusic | 3.5/5 stars |

In Thugz We Trust is the debut collaboration album by American rappers C-Bo and Yukmouth (together known as the supergroup Thug Lordz). The album was released March 30, 2004, on West Coast Mafia Records and Smoke-A-Lot Records. It peaked at number 63 on the Billboard Top R&B/Hip-Hop Albums and at number 47 on the Billboard Top Heatseekers. The album features guest performances by Silverback Guerillaz, Eastwood, Killa Tay and also Spice 1, who would later join the group on their second album, Thug Lordz Trilogy.

== Track listing ==
| # | Title | Performers | Producer | Time |
|---|---|---|---|---|
| 1 | "Go Hard in the Paint" | Yukmouth, C-Bo, Killa Tay | Mobetta | 4:09 |
| 2 | "44 Mag Glocc" | Yukmouth, C-Bo, Killa Tay | Raw Steel | 3:25 |
| 3 | "She's a Hoe" | Yukmouth, C-Bo | Mobetta | 3:57 |
| 4 | "He Ain't a Thug" | Yukmouth, C-Bo, Silverback Guerillaz | Mark Sparks | 5:44 |
| 5 | "American Dream" | Yukmouth | Nan Dogg | 4:16 |
| 6 | "Get Away" | Yukmouth, C-Bo | J Classic | 3:32 |
| 7 | "Killa Cali" | Yukmouth, C-Bo, Spice 1 | E-A-Ski & CMT, SR. Shakur | 4:30 |
| 8 | "Bulletproof Love" | Yukmouth, C-Bo, Eastwood | Rhythm D | 4:09 |
| 9 | "Get Ya Money (Be a Thug Lord)" | Yukmouth, C-Bo | Mark Sparks | 4:02 |
| 10 | "Made Men" | Yukmouth, C-Bo, Killa Tay | Mobetta | 4:47 |
| 11 | "My Life" | C-Bo | Bosko | 4:04 |
| 12 | "Let's Flip Her" | Yukmouth, C-Bo | Raw Steel | 4:05 |
| 13 | "21 Gun Salute" | Yukmouth, C-Bo | E-A-Ski & CMT | 4:26 |

== Chart history ==
| Chart (2004) | Peak position |
|---|---|
| U.S. Billboard Top Heatseekers | 47 |
| U.S. Billboard Top R&B/Hip-Hop Albums | 63 |
