= Marvaless =

American rapper (born 1975)

- Born: Marva Jean Cooks; August 28, 1975 (age 51)
- Origin: Sacramento, California, U.S.
- Genres: Rap; Gangsta rap; West Coast hip hop; Hardcore rap
- Occupation: Rapper
- Years active: 1992–present
- Labels: Marvaless Muzic, West Coast Mafia Records, Legasi Records, AWOL Records

Marva Jean Cooks II (born August 28, 1975), known professionally as Marvaless, is an American rapper from Sacramento, California.

== Career ==
In 1992, a year after finishing high school, Cooks got together with C-Bo to record her debut album, Ghetto Blues, through AWOL Records. Successive solo releases were Just Marvaless (1995), Wiccked (1996), Fearless (1998), and Ghetto Blues 2001 (2001). During this time, Cooks also made a series of guest appearances on records by acts including 2Pac, Conscious Daughters, Mac Mall, Master P, Mac Dre, and AWOL label mates Lunasicc and C-Bo. She also performed with artists including Ice Cube, Biggie Smalls, Do or Die, and Redman.

In 2003 she returned to the scene with Bonnie and Clyde, a collaboration album with Messy Marv, followed by another collaboration, 3 Da Hard Way, with The Jacka and Husalah of Mob Figaz in 2005. She followed with her next solo album Ready Made the same year. Her most recent album, Queen of The Mob, was released in 2010 and she is planning to release another solo album, Marva Jean, with Legasi Records. She also featured in the album "A Female Grind" by Thugg Miss in 2013.

== Discography ==
=== Studio albums ===
Title	Release	Peak chart positions	
Title	Release	US	US R&B
Ghetto Blues	1994	—	100
Wiccked	1996	—	48
Fearless	1998	—	43
Ghetto Blues 2001	2001	—	—
Ready Made	2005	—	—
Queen of the Mob	2010	—	—

=== Collaboration albums ===
- Bonnie and Clyde with Messy Marv (2003)
- 3 Da Hard Way with Husalah and The Jacka (2005)

=== Extended plays ===
Title	Release	Peak chart positions	
Title	Release	US	US R&B
Just Marvaless	1995	—	71

== Guest appearances ==
Title	Release	Other artist(s)	Album
"Stompin' in My Steel Toes"	1995	C-Bo	Tales from the Crypt
"Take It How You Want Too"	1995	C-Bo	Tales from the Crypt
"I Can't See tha Light"	1997	C-Bo	One Life 2 Live
"I'm Gonna Get Mine"	1997	C-Bo, Lunasicc	One Life 2 Live
"Survival 1st"	1997	C-Bo, Lunasicc	One Life 2 Live
"The Funk Is On"	1997	Lunasicc, C-Bo	Mr. Lunasicc
"It Don't Stop"	1997	Lunasicc, Killa Tay	Mr. Lunasicc
"Professional Ballers"	1998	C-Bo, Pizzo, Mac Mall, JT the Bigga Figga, Killa Tay	Til My Casket Drops
"Dub C M'D Out"	2002	C-Bo, Lil Cyco, Pizzo, Thug Misses	West Coast Mafia
"New Beginning"	2012	C-Bo, Rydah J. Klyde, T-Nutty	Orca
"Dramatic"	2012	C-Bo, Killa Tay	Orca
"Respect a Real Bitch"	2014	Thugg Miss, TinkBadChick	A Female Grind
