= Tha Realest =

American rapper (born 1973)

- Also known as: Tha Realest; Tenkamenin The Vigilante
- Born: Jevon Jones; October 11, 1973 (age 52); Dallas, Texas, U.S.
- Genres: Hip hop
- Occupation: Rapper
- Years active: 1993–present
- Labels: Death Row Records; Omerta/Tommy Boy; Tru 'Dat'; Team Dime/RBC Records
- Website: tharealest.com tharealest.forumer.com

Jevon Jones (born October 11, 1973) is an American rapper better known by his stage name Tha Realest, and formerly Tenkamenin The Vigilante (or simply Tenkamenin). His debut album, Witness Tha Realest, was released on July 14, 2009, following numerous delays. Tha Realest is also known, often in a negative light, for his strikingly similar voice to deceased rapper and former label-mate, Tupac Shakur. Tha Realest is also a member of The Regime.

== Personal life ==
Jones was born in Dallas, Texas. His father worked as a preacher. As an Oak Cliff native, Jones started rapping in the early 1980s at the age of 10 and competed in rap battles on the local circuit. In the early 1990s, Jones and former Dallas Cowboys player, Kevin Smith, formed their first record label called Puppy Dog Unlimited Records. Tha Realest got married on July 7, 2011.

=== Death Row Records ===
Jones began his association with Death Row Records in March 1996 when he auditioned for Tupac Shakur in Las Vegas. Following Shakur's death in September 1996, Suge Knight offered Jones a contract with the label. He made his musical debut on the Gang Related soundtrack, appearing in two songs with rapper J-Flexx under the pseudonym Tenkamenin, sharing his name with the eponymous ruler of the Ghana Empire. In 1999 he performed several tracks on the Death Row collaboration Suge Knight Represents: Chronic 2000 alongside fellow Death Row artists Swoop G and Lil' C-Style. These songs had been written by Tha Realest for his solo project which was to be called Inside Out. He would again collaborate with them on yet another Death Row compilation titled Too Gangsta for Radio, appearing on the tracks "Fuck Dre" and "Fuck Hollywood". "Fuck Dre", seemingly a response to the Dr. Dre single "Forgot About Dre", insults many former Death Row artists and their affiliates, primarily Dr. Dre, Snoop Dogg, Nate Dogg, N.W.A and Eminem, who is an artist on Dr. Dre's Aftermath Records.

On October 17, 1999, after working on Suge Knight Represents: Chronic 2000, Tha Realest sustained relatively serious injuries to the foot, having been shot in a drive-by shooting after leaving the studio in which he had just finished recording a song with Tha Dogg Pound (Kurupt and Daz Dillinger). Dwayne "Draws" Dupree, a security officer working in the area, was also shot, and died shortly after.

=== After Death Row Records ===
Following Suge Knight's release from prison, Tha Realest left Death Row Records in late 2001 to pursue a record deal in order to release his debut album, for which he had recorded approximately 150 songs. Tha Realest had difficulty obtaining a contract as labels were unwilling to associate with a former artist of Death Row Records and the notoriety it accumulated over the years. In 2002, Tha Realest formed his own record label, 2 Real Entertainment (later Omertà Entertainment). In 2004, he recorded a mixtape at Can-Am Studios with Mob Life Records artist 730 entitled From East 2 West which featured musical performances by Swoop G and New Child of Outlawz. It was released in early 2007.

Tha Realest was signed to Tru 'Dat' Entertainment in 2006, a company founded by Hysear Randell to seek and recruit talented individuals in film, music, fashion and sports. The music video for his debut single, "Eurry Now and Then" was released shortly thereafter. It features cameo appearances by C-Bo, Yukmouth, Nutt-So, Young Hogg, Big C-Style and Ray J. In 2007, Hysear was accused of embezzling millions of dollars' worth of tax payers money through fraudulent money transfers. Tru 'Dat' Entertainment was subsequently forced to discontinue the label.

On July 14, 2009, Tha Realest released his album Witness Tha Realest, which had been delayed substantially due to the demise of Tru 'Dat' Entertainment. It was distributed by E1 Music via RBC Records and Team Dime Entertainment. Tha Realest made the following comment about the album:

They say: 'good things come to those who wait,' the position I was in at Death Row wasn't right for me. I didn't always get the due credit I believe I deserved and I finally got out of that deal. I put so many songs on Witness Tha Realest because so many people have been waiting so long for my CD to drop. You won't have to fast forward through any of the songs on the CD. You're gonna' have to give me an hour and ten minutes of your time when you listen to this CD. I'm not about to give you only three songs worth listening to. $15 is lunch money for a lot of kids. With Witness Tha Realest, I'm a holla at you. I'm going to give you something that you can knock for a while man … value for your dollar is long overdue in today's music market.

Witness Tha Realest Mixtape, was released in November 2006 which consisted of some leftovers from the original Witness Tha Realest studio album scheduled for release on July 15, 2004. This, however, changed due to the absence of a distribution company.

Tha Realest worked on his much anticipated second studio album Remember My Name which was due to be released in the Summer of 2013. Two music videos were expected to be released for his upcoming album, one of them having already been confirmed to be directed by Tha Razor, who already took part in some of his other video projects like Peep 'N' Game and Thug Lova in the past. He is also working on albums with long-time associate C-Bo and underground artist Don Twizzi as well as a debut studio album by The Regime. At the moment, he's active on various social networks online and he's aiding new, upcoming artists who are making a name for themselves in Hip-Hop.

In 2021, Tha Realest formally released "2nite We're Enemies" which features C-Bo & WC. The song had previously been featured in Benjamin Crump's the television documentary series Who Killed Tupac?

=== Films ===
Tha Realest, like many other rappers such as G-Unit and Ice-T, has appeared in several hip-hop themed pornographic productions including a few alongside other rappers such as Snoop Dogg who, himself, has produced several pornographic films. His main productions are titled Tha Realest #1 and #2 and feature original music by Tha Realest and many popular pornographic actresses such as Mika Tan, Lyla Lei and Brooke Haven. The films were produced by Antiqua Pictures and Fatt Entertainment. The Realest also appeared in a low-budget film titled Slumber Party which was released in 2005 and also featured several former Death Row Records performers such as Daz Dillinger and Crooked I.

== Discography ==
Studio albums

- Witness Tha Realest (2009)

== Filmography and TV series ==
| Year | Title | Role | Notes |
|---|---|---|---|
| 2005 | Slumber Party | Himself | Cameo |
| 2008 | Triloquist | Himself | Performer |
| 2008 | Keeping Up with the Kardashians | Himself | S02E11 |
| 2011 | Old Skool with Terry & Gita | Himself | S01E05 |

=== Pornographic movies ===
| Year | Title | Role | Notes |
|---|---|---|---|
| 2005 | Tha Realest – The Party's Just Getting Started! | Himself | Host |
| 2006 | Tha Realest – Volume 2: The Party Continues! | Himself | Host |

=== Music videos ===
| Year | Title | Artist | Notes |
|---|---|---|---|
| 1999 | Unconditional Love | 2Pac | Tha Realest plays 2Pac. |
| 1999 | Because of You Girl | Tha Dogg Pound ft. Tha Realest | |
| 2000 | Cindafella | Top Dogg | Cameo |
| 2006 | Get Wild | The Regime | |
| 2006 | Apple Bottom Anthem | Yukmouth ft. Tha Realest & Dru Down | |
| 2007 | Eurry Now & Then | Tha Realest | |
| 2010 | Peep'N Game | Tha Realest ft. Ray J | |
| 2010 | Thug Lover | Parlay Starr ft. Tha Realest | |
