= Big Lurch =

American rapper and convicted murderer

- Born: Antron Singleton; September 15, 1976 (age 50)
- Origin: Dallas, Texas, U.S.
- Genres: Southern hip-hop; gangsta rap; horrorcore
- Occupations: Rapper; poet
- Years active: 1996–2002
- Labels: MCA; Black Market
- Formerly of: Cosmic Slop Shop

Antron Singleton Sr. (born September 15, 1976), better known by his stage name Big Lurch, is an American rapper and poet. He is serving a life sentence for murdering 21-year-old roommate Tynisha Ysais and eating parts of her body in April 2002. He was a member of the group Cosmic Slop Shop.

== Biography ==
Born on September 15, 1976, Singleton grew up in Dallas, Texas. He began writing poetry at age seven. Singleton started his rap career as a member of the hip-hop group Cosmic Slop Shop. The group fell apart in 1999, after releasing their album Da Family (1998), and Singleton pursued a solo career which was cut short in 2002, when he murdered his roommate Tynisha Ysais. He has been in prison for the crime, without the possibility of parole, since November 7, 2003. His only solo album, It's All Bad, was released in 2004.

== Murder and lawsuit ==
On April 10, 2002, 25-year-old Singleton murdered his 21-year-old roommate Tynisha Ysais in the apartment he shared with her and her boyfriend in Los Angeles, California.

The victim was found in her apartment at night by a friend. Her chest had been torn open and a three-inch blade was found broken off in her scapula. Teeth marks were found on her face and on her lungs, which had been torn from her chest. The friend testified that Singleton was naked and covered in blood, standing on the street and staring at the sky. A medical examination performed shortly after his capture found human flesh in his stomach that was not his own. The victim's boyfriend said he and Singleton used PCP the day before the murder took place.

On November 7, 2003, Singleton was sentenced to life in prison without the possibility of parole. He had been convicted of murder and aggravated mayhem the previous June after pleading not guilty by reason of insanity at the time of the murder. The defense argued that Singleton was in a psychotic state due to his use of PCP the night before the murder. The court ruled that his intoxication and claimed insanity were not satisfactory reasons for committing the crime. The district attorney argued that drug use can not be used as grounds for an insanity plea in California, and the judge agreed.

In 2003, Ysais' mother filed a wrongful death lawsuit against Singleton, his bodyguard, Stress Free Records, Death Row Records, and Ysais' boyfriend. The suit charged that the labels had provided Singleton with drugs "to encourage [him] to act out in an extreme violent manner so as to make him more marketable as a 'gangsta rap' artist." "Part of what makes a Gangsta Rap artist marketable is the fact that the artist is a participant in violent activities," the lawsuit claimed. Death Row protested it had no connection to Singleton and was dropped from the lawsuit.

Singleton was interviewed for the 2011 documentary Rhyme and Punishment.

He is currently incarcerated at California State Prison, Los Angeles County.

== Discography ==
- Da Family (with Cosmic Slop Shop) (1998)
- It's All Bad (2004)

== See also ==
- List of incidents of cannibalism
