= Brotha Lynch Hung discography =

American hip hop artist

- Studio albums: 9
- Extended plays: 6
- Compilation albums: 11
- Mixtapes: 3
- Collaborative albums: 7

The discography of Brotha Lynch Hung, an American hip hop artist consists of nine studio albums, seven collaborative albums, eleven compilation albums, six extended plays and three mixtapes. His music has been released on record labels Black Market Records, BP Metro, Siccmade Music, Madesicc Music and Strange Music.

== Albums ==
=== Studio albums ===
List of studio albums, with selected chart positions
| Title | Album details | Peak chart positions | | |
| Title | Album details | US | US R&B | US Rap |
|---|---|---|---|---|
| Season of da Siccness | Released: February 28, 1995; Label: Black Market, Priority; Format: CD, LP, cassette, digital download | 163 | 26 | – |
| Loaded | Released: September 16, 1997; Label: Black Market, Priority; Format: CD, LP, cassette, digital download | 28 | 9 | – |
| EBK4 | Released: June 27, 2000; Label: Black Market; Format: CD, LP, cassette, digital download | 86 | 28 | – |
| The Virus | Released: November 13, 2001; Label: Black Market; Format: CD, LP, cassette, digital download | – | 71 | – |
| Lynch by Inch: Suicide Note | Released: June 10, 2003; Label: Siccmade Muzicc; Format: CD, LP, DVD, cassette, digital download | 132 | 21 | – |
| Dinner and a Movie | Released: March 23, 2010; Label: Strange Music; Format: CD, digital download | 69 | 18 | 6 |
| Coathanga Strangla | Released: April 5, 2011; Label: Strange Music; Format: CD, digital download | 68 | 18 | 9 |
| Mannibalector | Released: February 5, 2013; Label: Strange Music; Format: CD, digital download | 67 | – | 8 |
| Season of da Siccness 2: Kevlar | Released: May 31, 2024; Label: Madesicc Muzicc, RBC, BMG; Format: CD, digital download | – | – | – |

=== Collaborative albums ===
List of collaborative albums, with selected chart positions
| Title | Album details | Peak chart positions | | |
| Title | Album details | US | US R&B | US Rap |
|---|---|---|---|---|
| Blocc Movement (with C-Bo) | Released: August 28, 2001; Label: JCOR, Interscope; Format: CD, LP, cassette, digital download | 79 | 20 | – |
| The Plague (with Doomsday Productions) | Released: August 6, 2002; Label: Cin Sity; Format: CD, digital download | – | – | – |
| Uthanizm (with Tall Cann G) | Released: November 18, 2003; Label: Siccmade Muzicc; Format: CD, digital download | – | – | – |
| Trigganometry (with COS as Suspicion) | Released: 2004; Label: Black Market; Format: CD, digital download | – | – | – |
| The New Season (with MC Eiht) | Released: January 24, 2006; Label: Real Talk; Format: CD, digital download | – | 81 | – |
| Suspicion, Vol. 2 (with COS) | Released: July 14, 2009; Label: Black Market; Format: CD, digital download | – | – | – |
| Premeditated (with Ren Da Heatmonsta) | Released: September 11, 2017; Label: Madesicc Muzicc; Format: CD, digital download | – | – | – |

=== Compilation albums ===
List of compilation albums, with selected chart positions
| Title | Album details | Peak chart positions | | |
| Title | Album details | US | US R&B | US Rap |
|---|---|---|---|---|
| Nigga Deep (with Sicx) | Released: 1998; Label: Siccmade Muzicc; Format: CD, cassette, digital download | – | – | – |
| Now Eat: The Album | Released: December 19, 2000; Label: Siccmade Muzicc; Format: CD, cassette, digital download | – | 86 | – |
| Appearances: Book 1 | Released: January 19, 2002; Label: Black Market; Format: CD, cassette, digital download | – | 91 | – |
| Remains: Book II | Released: 2002; Label: Black Market; Format: CD, digital download | – | – | – |
| Book III | Released: 2002; Label: BP Metro; Format: CD, digital download | – | – | – |
| Siccmixx: Our Most Gangsta Hits (with Doomsday Productions) | Released: June 29, 2004; Label: Cin Sity; Format: CD, digital download | – | – | – |
| The Ripgut Collection | Released: May 29, 2007; Label: Madesicc Muzicc; Format: CD, digital download | – | 55 | 25 |
| The Fixxx | Released: August 7, 2007; Label: Black Market; Format: CD, digital download | – | 67 | – |
| The Ripgut Collections Two | Released: November 1, 2011; Label: Madesicc Muzicc; Format: CD, digital download | – | – | – |
| The Suicide Tour: Ten Years Later | Released: October 7, 2014; Label: Siccmade Muzicc; Format: CD, DVD, digital download | – | – | – |
| Turnmanator X Torment | Released: April 22, 2023; Label: Madesicc Muzicc, RBC, BMG; Format: LP | – | – | – |
| Choice Kuttz: Da Best of Brotha Lynch Hung | Released: August 21, 2023; Label: Madesicc Muzicc, RBC, BMG; Format: Digital download | – | – | – |

== Extended plays ==
List of extended plays, with selected chart positions
| Title | EP details | Peak chart positions | | |
| Title | EP details | US | US R&B | US Rap |
|---|---|---|---|---|
| 24 Deep | Released: 1993; Label: Black Market; Format: CD, LP, cassette, digital download | – | 91 | – |
| Bullet Maker | Released: April 22, 2016; Label: Madesicc Muzicc; Format: Digital download | – | – | – |
| Torment | Released: February 22, 2019; Label: Madesicc Muzicc, RBC, BMG; Format: Digital download | – | – | – |
| The Turnmanator | Released: April 24, 2020; Label: Madesicc Muzicc, RBC, BMG; Format: Digital download | – | – | – |
| Fundamentals Of Ripgut Cannibalizum The Vault | Released: May 8, 2020; Label: Madesicc Muzicc, RBC, BMG; Format: Digital download | – | – | – |
| Fatal | Released: March 26, 2021; Label: Madesicc Muzicc, RBC, BMG; Format: Digital download | – | – | – |

== Mixtapes ==
List of mixtapes, with selected chart positions
| Title | Mixtape details | Peak chart positions | | |
| Title | Mixtape details | US | US R&B | US Rap |
|---|---|---|---|---|
| The Alter Ego Project (with G-Macc) | Released: 2010; Label: Madesicc Muzicc; Format: Digital download | – | – | – |
| The Gas Station | Released: 2010; Label: Madesicc Muzicc; Format: Digital download | – | – | – |
| The Gas Station, Volume 2 | Released: January 10, 2014; Label: Madesicc Muzicc; Format: Digital download | – | – | – |

== Guest appearances ==
List of non-single guest appearances, with other performing artists, showing year released and album name
| Title | Year | Other artist(s) | Album |
|---|---|---|---|
| "Crazy Than a Mutha Fuck" | 1992 | X-Raided | Psycho Active |
| "That's How My Trigga Went" | 1992 | X-Raided, Triple Sicx Bounty | Psycho Active |
| "That Siccness" | 1992 | X-Raided, S.A.C., Young Meek, CYCO | Psycho Active |
| "Bloccstyle" | 1995 | Mr. Doctor | Setripn' Bloccstyle |
| "Fucc Yo Side" | 1995 | Mr. Doctor, Baby Reg | Setripn' Bloccstyle |
| "Killa Cap Pilla" | 1995 | Mr. Doctor | Setripn' Bloccstyle |
| "40 Oz & Chronic Dice" | 1995 | Mr. Doctor, Foe Loco | Setripn' Bloccstyle |
| "Treat 'em Like Hoez" | 1995 | Mr. Doctor | Setripn' Bloccstyle |
| "Da Real Deal" | 1995 | Mr. Doctor | Setripn' Bloccstyle |
| "It's Real" | 1997 | Mr. Serv-On, Master P | Life Insurance |
| "Tremendous" | 1997 | Sicx, D-Dub, Tall Can G | Southwest Riders |
| "Situation On Dirty" | 1997 | —N/a | From the Original Motion Picture Soundtrack: I'm Bout It |
| "Halloween" | 1999 | The Delinquents | Bosses Will Be Bosses |
| "Raw Meat" | 2001 | Keak da Sneak | The Appearances of Keak da Sneak |
| "Keep Shit Locced" | 2002 | C-Bo, Fat Tone | West Coast Mafia |
| "My World" | 2006 | Tech N9ne, Dalima | Everready (The Religion) |
| "Ice Cream" | 2007 | Mac Dre | Starters in the Game |
| "Blast On 'Em" | 2007 | Tha Dogg Pound | Dogg Chit |
| "Killa Season" | 2008 | Grave Plott | The Plott Thickens |
| "Strange Music Box" | 2009 | Tech N9ne | K.O.D. |
| "What Did Y'all Do" | 2009 | Young Buck, C-Bo | —N/a |
| "Dark Knights" | 2010 | Kutt Calhoun | Raw and Un-Kutt |
| "What's Yo Psycho?" | 2010 | Tech N9ne | The Gates Mixed Plate (Strange Music Pre-Order Edition) |
| "Pill Poppin' Music" | 2010 | Cognito | Automatic |
| "In My Dreams" | 2010 | Krizz Kaliko, Big Scoob, Barbara Word | Shock Treatment |
| "This Is Hip Hop" | 2011 | Tech N9ne | All 6's and 7's (iTunes Deluxe Edition) |
| "How Ya' Do Dat' Again" | 2011 | Young Bleed, Tech N9ne | Preserved |
| "My Favorite" | 2011 | Tech N9ne, Prozak | Welcome to Strangeland |
| "Sad Circus" | 2011 | Tech N9ne, Courtney Kuhnz | Welcome to Strangeland |
| "Hunger" | 2012 | Tech N9ne, Bishop | Boiling Point |
| "Addictive" | 2012 | C-Bo, Slick Pulla, Dead Mike | Orca |
| "Zombie" | 2012 | E-40, Tech N9ne | The Block Brochure: Welcome to the Soil 2 |
| "I Don't Know What I Did Last Night" | 2013 | Something Awful (Fury & Bizarre), King Gordy | Taking Lives |
| "Hush" | 2013 | Stevie Stone, Kutt Calhoun | 2 Birds 1 Stone |
| "501s and Rightsides" | 2013 | Kutt Calhoun | Black Gold |
| "Strangeulation II" | 2014 | Godemis, Stevie Stone, Murs | Strangeulation |
| "Tell Me If I'm Trippin" | 2015 | Tech N9ne, Tyler Lyon, Prozak | Strangeulation Vol. II |
| "Bacon" | 2017 | Godemis, Murs | Dominion |

== Music videos ==
| Year | Title | Director | Artist(s) |
As main performer
| 1995 | "Rest In Piss" | | |
| 1997 | "One Mo' Pound" | | |
| 2003 | "Everywhere I Go" | | |
| 2003 | "I Went From" | | |
| 2006 | "You Don't Know Who I Know" | | |
| 2010 | "Meat" | Dan Gedman | |
| 2010 | "I Plotted (My Next Murder)" | Dan Gedman | |
| 2010 | "Colostomy Bag"^{[A1]} | Dan Gedman | |
| 2011 | "Coathanga Strangla" | Dan Gedman | |
| 2011 | "Spit It Out" | Dan Gedman | |
| 2011 | "Mannibalector" | Dan Gedman | |
| 2011 | "Spit It Out" - The Strange Version | Dan Gedman | |
| 2013 | "Meat Cleaver" | Unknown | |
| 2013 | "Krocadil" | Unknown | |
Cameo appearances
| 2010 | "KC Tea" | Dan Gedman | Tech N9ne |

Music videos notes
1. A Director's Cut version of this video was released in 2011.
