= The Appearances of Keak da Sneak =

Compilation album by Keak da Sneak
- Released: October 23, 2001
- Recorded: 2001
- Genres: Gangsta rap, West Coast hip hop
- Label: Moe Doe Records
- Producers: Ant Banks, One Drop Scott, Tone Capone

Keak da Sneak chronology
Hi-Tek (2001)	The Appearances of Keak da Sneak (2001)	Retaliation (2002)

Professional ratings
Review scores
Source	Rating
Allmusic	3/5 stars

The Appearances of Keak da Sneak is a compilation album released by rapper Keak da Sneak, featuring songs from various previously released albums on which he had a guest appearance. It was released on October 23, 2001 by Moe Doe Records and was produced by Ant Banks, One Drop Scott and Tone Capone. The album featured various guest appearances, including from Luniz, Mac Dre and his group 3X Krazy. It sold 5,000 copies in its first week of release.

== Track listing ==
1. "Mobb Shit" – 5:11 (feat. Luniz)
2. "In tha Doe" – 4:19
3. "Rap Game" – 4:09 (feat. B.A.)
4. "Ride Fo This" – 3:01
5. "Broke Off" – 4:57 (feat. The Delinquents & 3X Krazy)
6. "Ring It" – 4:45 (feat. E-40, Spice 1 & Harm)
7. "Mac Dammit and Friends" – 3:33 (feat. Mac Dre & PSD)
8. "No Remorse" – 4:09
9. "No Win Situation" – 4:04 (feat. King T & Ant Banks)
10. "I'd Rather Smoke With U" – 4:10
11. "Comin for Me" – 4:39
12. "Raw Meat" – 2:56 (feat. Brotha Lynch Hung)
13. "Welcome to Oakland" – 4:17
14. "Ain't Shit Changed" – 4:25
15. "Broke" – 4:15
16. "Shockn Niggaz" – 3:44 (feat. Killa Tay)
17. "Life Ain't Bullshit" – 3:34
