= Done Deal =

Done Deal may refer to:

== Music ==
- Ya Boy's cousin San Quinn's independent label Done Deal
- Done Deal Enterprises, who claimed a Lil Wayne song and sued Cash Money Records

=== Albums ===
- Done Deal (Big Mello album)

=== Songs ===
- "Done Deal", song by Flo Rida and Rick Ross 2007
- "Done Deal" (D.B.A. featuring B-Legit, Jay Tee & Baby Beesh ), by Jay Tee (section N2Deep albums)
- "Done Deal", by Kevin Kayirangwa
- "Done Deal", from Love Without Mercy (song) B-side 1992
- "Done Deal", by X-Raided from Xorcist (album) and reissued on The X-Filez, Vol. 1
- "Done Deal", by rap duo, Totally Insane Backstreet Life

== See also ==
- Deal (disambiguation)
