= Kunta Kinte (album) =

Studio album by Keak da Sneak
- Released: February 21, 2006
- Recorded: 2005
- Genre: Hip hop
- Label: Sumday Entertainment
- Producers: Keak da Sneak, Big Hollis

Keak da Sneak chronology
Contact Sport (2006)	Kunta Kinte (2006)	Thizz Iz Allndadoe (2006)

Kunta Kinte is a solo album released by rapper Keak da Sneak. The album is essentially a re-release of 2005's Town Business with a few extra tracks.

== Reception ==
Professional ratings
Review scores
Source	Rating
Allmusic	3.5/5 stars

== Track listing ==
1. "Scarface Dust"- 3:41
2. "Blind to Get It"- 3:39
3. "Super Hyphy"- 3:26
4. "Town Business"- 4:36
5. "Get That Doe"- 3:24
6. "T-Shirt Blue Jeans & Nike's #2"- 3:18
7. "Bumpers"- 4:36
8. "Light Gray Shit"- 4:53
9. "Support Your Own Supple"- 3:47 (Featuring Luni Coleone)
10. "What a Relief"- 3:46
11. "All My Niggas"- 3:15
12. "Dope House's and Powder"- 4:39
13. "Leanin"- 4:10
14. "Lookin at Booty"- 4:48
15. "Yeah"- 6:25
