= X-Ology: The Best of X-Raided =

Compilation album by X-Raided
- Released: August 14, 2001
- Length: 1:13:35
- Label: Black Market Records
- Producers: X-Raided, Big Hollis, KG

X-Raided chronology
The Initiation (2001)	X-Ology: The Best of X-Raided (2001)	And He Shall Appear (2001)

Professional ratings
Review scores
Source	Rating
Allmusic	4/5 stars

X-Ology: The Best of X-Raided is the first compilation album released by rapper X-Raided. It was released on August 14, 2001, through Black Market Records and was produced by X-Raided, Brotha Lynch Hung, Sicx, Big Hollis and KG.

== Track listing ==
1. "White Man's Burden"- 4:14
2. "Unforgiven"- 3:30
3. "Duece-5 to Life"- 4:40
4. "As the World Spins"- 4:32
5. "The Hole"- 3:42
6. "Bitch Killa"- 3:54
7. "Macaframa"- 4:52
8. "Here We Come"- 2:14
9. "Where You At"- 2:59
10. "Lord Have Mercy"- 4:01
11. "Hold On"- 4:11
12. "Wit a Mask On" (feat. Da Misses, Chopah, Killa Hoe & Lunasicc) - 6:23
13. "Still Shooting"- 4:14
14. "Money, Power, Respect"- 3:37
15. "Misanthrophy"- 5:39
16. "Trial by Fury"- 4:13
17. "I Ain't Dead Yet"- 4:47
18. "Write What I See"- 1:51
