= Nigga Deep =

Compilation album by Sicx & Brotha Lynch Hung
- Released: September 15, 1998
- Recorded: 1986–1992
- Genres: Gangsta rap, West Coast hip hop, Horrorcore, G-Funk, underground hip hop
- Length: 49:06
- Labels: Black Market Records, Siccmade Muzicc
- Producer: Kevin Mann

Sicx & Brotha Lynch Hung chronology
Nigga Deep (1998)	Now Eat: The Album (2000)

Professional ratings
Review scores
Source	Rating
Allmusic	4/5 stars

Nigga Deep is a compilation album by Sicx and Brotha Lynch Hung, released in 1998.

== Track listing ==
No.	Title	Length
1.	"'N All Dat Shit"	1:41
2.	"Ruff & Rugged"	5:14
3.	"Devils & Gunsmoke"	3:11
4.	"Fuck Everybody (Insert)"	0:19
5.	"One Nigga Dead"	3:31
6.	"Iz He Gone (Insert)"	0:26
7.	"Raw Edge Bullshit"	3:14
8.	"Nigga Deep"	5:18
9.	"For the Funk of It" (feat. X-Raided)	7:49
10.	"Mr. No Print" (feat. The Swartzaniggas)	4:43
11.	"Creek Mobb's Loadin' 'Em Up"	4:21
12.	"Fair Warning"	1:16
13.	"Crawl Thru the Hood"	3:34
14.	"Where da Chronic Grows"	4:19
Total length:		49:06

== Samples ==
- "Ruff & Rugged" contains a sample of "Hyperbolicsyllabicsesquedalymistic" as performed by Isaac Hayes.
- "Ruff & Rugged" also contains samples from More Bounce to the Ounce performed by Zapp and Alwayz Into Somethin' by N.W.A.
- "Devils & Gunsmoke" contains a sample from Riding High by Faze-O.
- "Raw Edge Bullshit" also contains samples performed by Zapp More Bounce to the Ounce and Dance Floor.
- "Raw Edge Bullshit" also contains samples of "So Ruff, So Tuff" performed by Roger Troutman, Flash Light performed by Parliament and Funky Drummer performed by James Brown.
- "For the Funk of It" contains a sampled loop from One Nation Under a Groove as performed by Funkadelic.
- "For the Funk of It" also contains a sample from "Knucklehead" as performed by Grover Washington Jr.
- "Creek Mobb's Loadin' 'Em Up" contains a sample of Nappy Dugout as performed by Funkadelic.
- "Crawl Thru the Hood" contains a sample of Harry Manfredini's "Friday the 13th Original Theme".
