= Best of 3X Krazy, Vol. 2 =

Greatest hits album by 3X Krazy
- Released: March 26, 2002
- Recorded: 1995–1999
- Genres: Gangsta rap, G-funk, West Coast hip hop
- Label: Sneak Records
- Producers: Tone Capone, One Drop Scott, Big Deion, DJ Derell, Lev Berlak & Wilson Hankins a.k.a. Supaflexxx, Bosko, Wolverine, Keak Da Sneak

3X Krazy chronology
20th Century (2000)	Best of 3X Krazy, Vol. 2 (2002)	Flowamatic-9 (2003)

Professional ratings
Review scores
Source	Rating
Allmusic	link

Best of 3X Krazy, Vol. 2 is the second compilation released by 3X Krazy. It was released on March 26, 2002 for Sneak Records and was a sequel to the group's previous compilation, 20th Century.

== Track listing ==
1. "Somethin' 4 Dat Ass"- 4:08
2. "Sick-O"- 5:53
3. "Hoe Fuckin' Season"- 4:33
4. "Put Me to the Test"- 6:17
5. "Sunshine in the O"- 5:11
6. "In the Town"- 5:05
7. "Can't Fuck With This"- 5:31
8. "Open Your Eyes"- 4:09
9. "West Coast Shit"- 4:13
10. "Pistols Blazin"- 6:09
11. "Hit the Gas"- 5:05
12. "Ghetto Soldiers"- 4:54
13. "Get'em"- 5:03
14. "Tired of the Pain"- 4:54
