= Hi-Tek (album) =

Studio album by Keak da Sneak
- Released: June 16, 2001
- Studios: Federation Compound; Bad Ass Beat Lab (Oakland, CA); Studio C (Stockton, CA); Back House Studios; The Duggout Studios (Oakland, CA); Infinite Studios (Oakland, CA); The Hot Box
- Genres: West Coast hip-hop; gangsta rap
- Length: 1:11:10
- Label: Moe Doe Ent.
- Producers: Alonzo Jackson; Ant Banks; D-Dre; One Drop Scott; Rick Rock; Sonny B; Tone Capone

Keak da Sneak chronology
| Sneakacydal (1999) | Hi-Tek (2001) | The Appearances of Keak da Sneak (2001) |

Professional ratings
Review scores
| Source | Rating |
|---|---|
| AllMusic | 3/5 stars |

Hi-Tek is the second solo studio album by American rapper Keak da Sneak. It was released on June 16, 2001, through Moe Doe Entertainment. Production was handled by Tone Capone, Ant Banks, One Drop Scott, Rick Rock, Alonzo Jackson, D-Dre and Sonny B. It features guest appearances from Bart and Agerman of 3X Krazy, Ant Banks, E-40, Eklipze, Harm, T-Luni and Too $hort.

In the United States, the album debuted at number 95 on the Top R&B/Hip-Hop Albums, number 37 on the Heatseekers Albums and number 18 on the Independent Albums charts.

== Track listing ==
| No. | Title | Producer(s) | Length |
|---|---|---|---|
| 1. | "Intro" | | 0:51 |
| 2. | "Here Comes Keak da Sneak" | Rick Rock | 3:37 |
| 3. | "Like What" (featuring Agerman) | Ant Banks | 4:12 |
| 4. | "Tankin, Tinkin, Stinkin" (featuring E-40) | Rick Rock | 4:39 |
| 5. | "Somebody Gotta Pimp It (Somebody Gotta Pimp Her)" (featuring Too $hort) | Sonny B | 3:55 |
| 6. | "Ichi Blop! Blop!" | Tone Capone | 4:47 |
| 7. | "Gifted" | One Drop Scott | 4:05 |
| 8. | "Skit" | | 0:45 |
| 9. | "Moe Doe" | Tone Capone | 3:11 |
| 10. | "Take Me Away" (featuring Harm) | Tone Capone | 5:25 |
| 11. | "Pussy" (featuring B.A.) | One Drop Scott | 4:03 |
| 12. | "Drank, Weed, Sex" (featuring Ant Banks) | Ant Banks | 3:40 |
| 13. | "P.M." (featuring B.A., T-Luni and Eklipze) | Tone Capone | 5:26 |
| 14. | "Hi-Tek II" | Ant Banks | 3:54 |
| 15. | "Beat It Up" | One Drop Scott | 4:36 |
| 16. | "No Hair Weaves" (featuring Ant Banks) | Ant Banks | 4:11 |
| 17. | "That Way" | Tone Capone | 5:14 |
| 18. | "Blop Shit" | Alonzo Jackson; D-Dre | 4:39 |
| Total length: | | | 1:11:10 |

== Personnel ==
- Charles "Keak da Sneak" Williams – vocals, executive producer
- Ramone "Agerman" Curtis – vocals (track 3)
- Earl "E-40" Stevens – vocals (track 4)
- Todd "Too $hort" Shaw – vocals (track 5)
- Rodney "Harm" Waller – vocals (track 10)
- Lamore "B.A./Bart" Jacks – vocals (tracks: 11, 13)
- Anthony "Ant" Banks – vocals (tracks: 12, 16), producer & mixing (tracks: 3, 12, 14, 16)
- Tamarr "T-Luni" Holloway – vocals (track 13)
- Erick "Mr. Eklipse" Carson – vocals (track 13)
- Mike Marshall – background vocals (tracks: 17, 18)
- Ricardo "Rick Rock" Thomas – producer & mixing (tracks: 2, 4)
- Sonny Sowles – producer (track 5)
- Anthony "Tone Capone" Gilmour – producer (tracks: 6, 9, 10, 13, 17)
- Scott "One Drop Scott" Roberts – producer (tracks: 7, 11, 15)
- Alonzo Jackson – producer (track 18)
- D-Dre – producer (track 18)
- Mike Denton – mixing (tracks: 2, 4, 7, 9, 11, 13, 15, 18)
- Larry Funk – mixing (tracks: 5, 6, 10, 17), Pro Tools editing, mastering
- Michael Sexton – photography

== Charts ==
| Chart (2001) | Peak position |
|---|---|
| US Top R&B/Hip-Hop Albums (Billboard) | 95 |
| US Heatseekers Albums (Billboard) | 37 |
| US Independent Albums (Billboard) | 18 |
