= Copium (album) =

Studio album by Keak da Sneak
- Released: September 23, 2003
- Recorded: 2003
- Genres: Gangsta rap; West Coast hip hop
- Label: Moe Doe Entertainment
- Producers: E-A-Ski; Rick Rock; DJ Epik; D-Dre; CMT

Keak da Sneak chronology
The Farm Boyz (2002)	Copium (2003)	Keak da Sneak (2004)

Copium is the fifth studio solo album released by rapper Keak da Sneak. It was released on September 23, 2003, for Moe Doe Entertainment and produced by E-A-Ski, Rick Rock, DJ Epik, D-Dre, Goldfingaz and CMT. The album peaked at No. 87 on the Billboard Top R&B/Hip-Hop Albums chart, No. 37 on the Top Heatseekers chart and No. 38 on the Top Independent Albums chart.

== Track listing ==
1. "Intro"- 0:50
2. "T-Shirt, Blue Jeans, & Nike's"- 3:24 (featuring E-40)
3. "Hi Volume"- 3:58
4. "Know What I'm Talkin Bout"- 4:07
5. "Rappin My New Twist"- 4:45
6. "Copium"- 3:48
7. "Hi Speed Specialist"- 3:45
8. "Freakalistic"- 3:45
9. "Set Up Shop"- 3:44
10. "What It Do"- 3:40
11. "I Don't Wanna Go"- 3:43
12. "Raw"- 3:26
13. "Love da Kids"- 3:52
14. "Still Can't Get Enough"- 3:43
15. "That Be Me"- 3:40
16. "Think You Real"- 3:25
17. "To Wicked"- 4:10
