= The Best of 3X Krazy =

20th Century

Greatest hits album by 3X Krazy
- Released: October 10, 2000
- Recorded: 1995–1999
- Genres: Gangsta rap, G-funk, West Coast hip-hop
- Label: Sneak Records
- Producers: Tone Capone, One Drop Scott, Big Deion, DJ Derell, Lev Berlak, Bosko, Wolverine, Keak Da Sneak

3X Krazy chronology
Dual Committee (2000)	20th Century (2000)	Best of 3X Krazy, Vol. 2 (2002)

Professional ratings
Review scores
Source	Rating
AllMusic	3/5 stars

20th Century, also known as The Best of 3X Krazy, is the first compilation album released by 3X Krazy. It was released on October 10, 2000 and was a double CD.

== Track listing ==
No.	Title	Length
1.	"Hit the Gas"	5:06
2.	"Dedicated"	3:51
3.	"Hit 'Em Where It Hurts"	3:07
4.	"Bog Body Benz"	4:33
5.	"Murder Show"	4:02
6.	"Kaviealstars"	4:04
7.	"Your Friends"	4:04
8.	"Hatin' on a Playa"	4:57
9.	"Maria"	5:43
10.	"L.W.L."	4:02
11.	"Hit the Gas Again"	4:26
12.	"Big League"	3:31
13.	"Def Call"	4:18
14.	"Rocket Ship"	4:07
15.	"High Tech"	3:52
16.	"Ghetto Got Me Crazy"	5:11
17.	"Get the Money"	4:22
18.	"Bring the Pain"	4:35
19.	"Hit Niggas"	3:58
20.	"Sparkin Flames"	4:56
21.	"Thug Shit"	3:26
22.	"Why"	4:36
