= Welcome to Scokland =

Studio album by Keak Da Sneak and San Quinn
- Released: December 1, 2008
- Genre: Hyphy
- Length: 1:10:55
- Label: Ehustle.com Entertainment
- Producer: Cozmo; Jay Valle; King Looi

Keak Da Sneak chronology
Deified (2008)	Welcome to Scokland (2008)	All N Da Doe (2008)

San Quinn chronology
From a Boy to a Man (2008)	Welcome to Scokland (2008)	Detrimental (2010)

Professional ratings
Review scores
Source	Rating
RapReviews	7/10

Welcome to Scokland is the collaborative studio album by hyphy artists Keak da Sneak and San Quinn. It was released on December 1, 2008 via Ehustle.com Entertainment. Production was handled by Jay Valle, King Looi and Cozmo among others. The album did not reach the Billboard 200, however, it peaked at number 64 on the Top R&B/Hip-Hop Albums, number 24 on the Top Rap Albums and number 30 on the Heatseekers Albums in the United States.

== Track listing ==
No.	Title	Length
1.	"Lil' Quinn Intro"	0:38
2.	"Welcome to Scokland"	2:59
3.	"Blue Dolphin"	3:42
4.	"Hot 'N Cool"	4:05
5.	"She Fine"	4:15
6.	"Hollarin'"	3:16
7.	"Copy Cat"	3:42
8.	"Marinated Game Profane Slang"	3:49
9.	"Wanna See"	4:19
10.	"Back to Life"	3:57
11.	"C.A.S.H."	5:34
12.	"Streets Don't Lie"	2:58
13.	"We Can Bubble Up"	3:33
14.	"Comfortably Numb"	3:55
15.	"Fool 4 U"	4:36
16.	"Too Much"	4:04
17.	"On One"	3:36
18.	"Da Hood in Me"	3:17
19.	"Cannons on the Blocks"	4:40
Total length:		1:10:55

== Charts ==
Chart (2008)	Peak position
US Top R&B/Hip-Hop Albums (Billboard)	64
US Top Rap Albums (Billboard)	24
US Heatseekers Albums (Billboard)	30
