= Vengeance Is Mine (X-Raided album) =

Studio album by X-Raided
- Released: November 21, 2000
- Length: 58:15
- Label: Blackmarket
- Producer: X-Raided; Big Hollis; KG; RAW; DJ Shareil

X-Raided chronology
The Unforgiven: Vol 1 (1999)	Vengeance Is Mine (2000)	The Initiation (2001)

Professional ratings
Review scores
Source	Rating
Allmusic	link

Vengeance Is Mine is the fourth solo studio album released by rapper X-Raided. It was released on November 21, 2000, through Blackmarket Records and was produced by Big Hollis and KG. This album fulfilled X-Raided's contract with Black Market Records, the label he helped get off the ground with his 1992 debut Psycho Active. He left the label after Vengeance and started his own label, Mad Man Records.

== Track listing ==
All tracks are written by X-Raided.

No.	Title	Length
1.	"The Prophecy" (Intro)	1:04
2.	"Write What I See"	1:54
3.	"Hold On (What a Thug To Do)"	4:07
4.	"Most Wanted (Who They Wanna Kill)"	2:59
5.	"Who But Me" (feat. Gold Loc Da Kingpen)	4:16
6.	"Sac-a-Indo (Where I'm From)"	4:02
7.	"Kamikaze" (feat. Lunasicc)	4:40
8.	"When the Smoke Clears" (feat. Gold Loc Da Kingpen)	4:56
9.	"Vengeance is Mine"	3:44
10.	"Terrorist" (feat. Shaka Loc)	5:10
11.	"Hit the Club (Rip it Up)"	3:59
12.	"Post War Syndrum"	4:24
13.	"I Got Yo' Back"	4:37
14.	"Lord Have Mercy"	4:03
15.	"We Bang" (feat. Big No-Love & T-Nutty)	4:31
Total length:		58:15

== Personnel ==
- X-Raided – vocals, executive producer
- Big Hollis – producer (tracks 2, 5, 6, 7, 8, 9, 14, 15)
- KG – producer (tracks 3, 4, 10, 11, 12, 13)
- The VerbalTek – producer (track 1)
- Cedric Singleton – executive producer, album layout & photography
- Seasone Zachary – marketing/"Media Assassin"
- Deon "Big Pook Loc" Hurts – executive producer, management
- Phantom – album design & artwork
- Pete Harned – X-Raided chief legal counsel
- Clyde A. Polk – BMR product management
