= Unforgiven (X-Raided album) =

The Unforgiven: Vol. 1

Studio album by X-Raided
- Released: May 1999
- Recorded: December 1998 – February 1999
- Genre: Gangsta rap
- Length: 1:01:00
- Label: Black Market
- Producer: X-Raided; The Verbal Tek; RAW; DJ Sharehl

X-Raided chronology
Xorcist (1995)	The Unforgiven: Vol. 1 (1999)	Vengeance Is Mine (2000)

The Unforgiven: Vol. 1 is the third album by the American rapper X-Raided, released in May 1999 via Black Market Records. It featured production from X-Raided, The Verbal Tek/Bomb Productions, RAW and DJ Shareil. Unforgiven was X-Raided's first album to make it to the Billboard charts, reaching number 14 on the Top Heatseekers and number 54 on the Top R&B/Hip-Hop Albums.

X-Raided worked on Unforgiven while serving 31-years to life for murder at Salinas Valley State Prison in Soledad, California. Unlike his previous album which contained low quality vocal tracks recorded over the phone, the vocals for Unforgiven were recorded inside the jail, using smuggled equipment.

== Recording ==
Unlike X-Raided's previous album, Xorcist, which was recorded over the phone from Sacramento County Jail, Unforgiven was recorded inside the jail and featured vastly improved sound quality. It was rumored that a prison guard helped him smuggle recording equipment. According to Vibe magazine, 65 tracks were recorded in total. Some of the leftover tracks were later released on a compilation album Speak of the Devil (2000), with him choosing an anonymous pseudonym Nefarious to comply with the Son of Sam law.

== Critical reception ==
Professional ratings
Review scores
Source	Rating
AllMusic	3/5 stars
RapReviews	6.5/10
The Source	2.5/5 stars

Unforgiven received mixed reviews from music critics, with them highlighting the album's unique recording process. Stephen Thomas Erlewine of AllMusic thought it is "hard to view it as anything other than a novelty", adding that the vocals sounded isolated from the instrumentals. The Source's Dara Cook wrote: "Considering the extraordinary circumstances under which Unforgiven was produced, the surprisingly clear sound is indeed impressive." He commended X-Raided's vocal performance, but criticized the lack of diversity in his lyrics. In a retrospective review, Steve Juon of RapReviews said that Unforgiven is "far from a perfect album", as he believed that while the sound quality improved since the previous album, it was still below other albums recorded in a studio.

== Track listing ==
1. "Madman Intro" – 0:37
2. "Misanthropy" – 5:36
3. "Unforgiven" – 3:30
4. "Who Is Ya'll Niggas" – 4:23
5. "Spitten Venom" – 3:20
6. "Mortal Combat" – 4:31
7. "Macaframa" – 5:26
8. "Take Flight" – 4:48
9. "Cemetery Fulla G's" – 3:16
10. "Dead on Arrival Pt. 1" – 4:26
11. "Land of the Lost" – 4:40
12. "Kick It 2-Nite" – 3:14
13. "Mama's Pride & Joy" – 4:35
14. "Whatever It Took" – 3:34
15. "On the Rise" – 4:48
16. "Outro" – 1:05

== Charts ==
Chart (1999)	Peak position
US Top Heatseekers (Billboard)	14
US Top R&B/Hip-Hop Albums (Billboard)	54
