= King of tha Supa Dupa Hyphy =

Compilation album by Keak da Sneak
- Released: December 19, 2006
- Recorded: 2006
- Genre: Hip hop
- Label: Oarfin Records
- Producer: Keak da Sneak

Keak da Sneak chronology
Thizz Iz Allndadoe (2006)	King of tha Supa Dupa Hyphy (2006)	Da Bidness (2007)

King of tha Supa Dupa Hyphy is an official mixtape album released by Keak da Sneak. It is hosted by DJ Rick Lee.

== Track listing ==
1. "On Citas"- 2:25
2. "Super Hyphy"- 2:20
3. "Contact Sport"- 1:57
4. "Grand Daddy Cali"- 1:50
5. "I Cop Back"- 1:59
6. "Yadda Wha Wha"- 1:59
7. "Hyphy Wifee"- 3:03
8. "I Feed My Bitch"- 2:05
9. "Muscle Cars"- 2:29
10. "Cus Cus"- 2:20
11. "Show Me the Deer Foot"- 2:14
12. "Sk's Ak's"- 2:04
13. "Hello Buddy"- 3:04
14. "Know My Name"- 2:06
15. "Touch on Me Touch on You"- 2:23
16. "Flamboastin Gennessee"- 1:29
17. "Thighs, Legs, Breast & Biscuits"- 2:06
18. "What Does It All Mean"- 2:26
19. "Club Talk"- 2:27
20. "Like Yee"- 2:07
21. "She's in Da Building Yall"- 3:34
22. "Tell Me When to Go Trackademics"- 2:25
23. "On Citas"- 3:34
24. "I A'int Playin"- 2:26
25. "I'm Not Listenin"- 3:24
26. "I Can't Stop It"- 1:46
27. "Scrapin"- 2:22
28. "Like Damn!!!"- 2:54
29. "What Up"- 1:59
30. "Freaks"- 2:39
31. "Know What I'm Sayin"- 1:56
32. "White T-Shirt Blue Jeans & Nikes"- 2:47
33. "Keep It Goin"- 3:40
