= Cheddar Cheese I Say =

Studio album by Keak Da Sneak
- Released: August 28, 2012
- Genre: West Coast hip hop, hyphy
- Length: 53:29
- Label: RBC Records

Keak Da Sneak chronology
Keak Hendrix (2011)	Cheddar Cheese I Say (2012)

Cheddar Cheese I Say is the sixth full-length studio solo album released by Keak Da Sneak on August 28, 2012. it features guest appearances from Big Hollis among others.

== Track listing ==
Disc 1

1. "There They Go" (featuring Big Hollis & Goldie Gold)- 3:22
2. "Chance Taka" (featuring Complex & Krytykal) - 3:29
3. "Tatta Puttie" - 2:21
4. "Let 'Em Cut Their Own Throat " - 3:00
5. "Show Off" (featuring Complex) - 3:02
6. "So Serious" (featuring Tieck Tock) - 3:56
7. "Call Me Keak Da Sneak" (featuring D-Buck) - 2:51
8. "You Did Something" - 1:35
9. "The Names" - 2:28
10. "Against the Wall" - 3:44
11. "Making All Rights" - 3:57
12. "All P's" (featuring Sycosis) - 4:15
13. "Bussing" - 2:59
14. "Go" (featuring Sycosis) - 4:28
15. "The Sneak Come Out" - 3:12
16. "The Female Funk" - 2:11
17. "Get Hyphy" - 2:39
