= Season of da Siccness =

Studio album by Brotha Lynch Hung
- Released: February 28, 1995
- Recorded: 1994
- Genre: Gangsta rap; West Coast hip hop; horrorcore; G-funk; hardcore hip hop
- Length: 57:40
- Label: Black Market; Priority
- Producer: Kevin Mann

Brotha Lynch Hung chronology
24 Deep (1993)	Season of da Siccness (1995)	Loaded (1997)

Season of da Siccness: The Resurrection is the debut studio album by American rapper Brotha Lynch Hung, released on February 28, 1995, by Black Market Records and Priority Records.

== Background ==
Mann recorded and mixed the album in 1994 at Enharmonic Studio, Sacramento, California. The album is dedicated to Q-Ball (as stated in the album booklet), Mann's cousin who was murdered around the time of the album's creation. The song 'Liquor Sicc' touches on subjects of dealing with his death and retaliation. Personnel on the album include Brotha Lynch Hung, Mr. Doctor, Ron Foster, X-Raided, Zigg Zagg, Zoe, Sicx, Hyst, and Babe Reg. Mann has stated that he produced, mixed and mastered the entire album himself, which to this day is the only album in which he has done this. The album was reprinted and re-released in 2005 as the original Black Market pressing is out of print. This re-release is distributed by IDN Distribution.

== Reception ==
Professional ratings
Review scores
Source	Rating
AllMusic	4.5/5 stars

The album reached No. 13 on Billboard's Heatseekers chart, No. 26 on the Top R&B/Hip-Hop Albums chart, and No. 163 on the Billboard 200. It received 4.5 stars out of 5 from AllMusic.

In 2009, Fangoria named it as an iconic horrorcore album.

== Controversy ==
In September 1996, Joseph Edward "Bubba" Gallegos, an 18-year-old from Bayfield, Colorado, killed his roommates after ingesting methamphetamine and listening repeatedly to Locc 2 Da Brain, a song from the album. After attempting to kill his ex-girlfriend and taking two other students hostage, Gallegos was in turn killed by police. Gallegos was said to be a massive fan of Brotha Lynch Hung, and his minister suggested that the music played a role in the killings.

== Track listing ==
All tracks are written by Brotha Lynch Hung.

No.	Title	Length
1.	"Cusche Break (Intro)"	0:18
2.	"Siccmade"	3:46
3.	"Dead Man (Interlude)"	0:53
4.	"Rest in Piss"	4:42
5.	"Get Da Baby (Interlude)"	0:36
6.	"Return of da Baby Killa" (featuring Sicx)	4:13
7.	"Locc 2 da Brain" (featuring Zigg Zagg, Zo, Mr. Doctor, and Hyst)	5.28
8.	"Q-Ball (Interlude)"	1:08
9.	"Liquor Sicc"	5:52
10.	"40 Break (Interlude)"	1:14
11.	"Datz Real Gangsta"	2:34
12.	"Deep Down" (featuring Mr. Doctor and Ron Foster)	6:51
13.	"Dead Man Walking"	3:34
14.	"781 Redrum"	0:47
15.	"Season of da Siccness" (featuring Sicx)	3:54
16.	"Welcome 2 Your Own Death" (featuring Hyst)	5:19
17.	"Real Loccs"	4:15
18.	"Inhale with da Devil"	2:23
Total length:		57:40

== Personnel ==
- Brotha Lynch Hung – vocals, production
- Cedric Singleton – executive producer, layout photography & design
- Robert Foster – associate producer
- Darrin Keatley – engineering
- Leslie Debbs – project management

== Samples ==
- Locc 2 Da Brain: MC Shan - Left Me Lonely
- Datz Real Gangsta: Juicy - Sugar Free
- Deep Down: The Ohio Players - Funky Worm

== Charts ==
=== Weekly charts ===
Chart (1995)	Peak position
US Billboard 200	163
US Top R&B/Hip-Hop Albums (Billboard)	26

=== Year-end charts ===
Chart (1995)	Position
US Top R&B/Hip-Hop Albums (Billboard)	95
