= City of Kings =

City of Kings may refer to:

- Lima, Peru, founded as Ciudad de los Reyes ('City of Kings')
- City of Kings (album), by X-Raided, 2002
