= Xorcist (album) =

Studio album by X-Raided
- Released: December 12, 1995
- Recorded: 1995
- Genre: Horrorcore
- Length: 54:27
- Label: Blackmarket
- Producer: X-Raided; Ced Singleton; Willie Charles

X-Raided chronology
Psycho Active (1992)	Xorcist (1995)	Unforgiven (1999)

Xorcist is the second album by rapper X-Raided. It was released on December 12, 1995 for Blackmarket Records. In an interview X-Raided stated that he made the album while on trial. The track "Collect Call" on the album has a recording of a collect call from X-Raided which identifies him as "an inmate in Sacramento County Jail".

== Reception ==
In 2009, Fangoria named it as an iconic horrorcore album.

== Track listing ==
1. "Open Tha Casket" – 0:59
2. "I Ain't Dead Yet" – 5:24
3. "Recognize" (feat. Babe Reg & Lunasicc) – 5:11
4. "Body Count" (feat. Da Misses) – 3:48
5. "Collect Call" – 0:18
6. "Check Your Bitch" – 5:06
7. "Blaze Up" – 0:21
8. "Wanna Get High?" (feat. Lunasicc) – 5:47
9. "Unxplainable" – 1:09
10. "Deuce-5 To Life" – 4:39
11. "Unfukwitable" (feat. Da Misses & Babe Reg) – 3:51
12. "Liquor, Niggaz & Triggaz" (feat. Brotha Lynch Hung & Sicx) – 5:43
13. "Done Deal" (feat. Da Misses) – 4:39
14. "Brainz" – 1:02
15. "Wit a Mask On" (feat. Da Misses, Chopah, Killa Hoe & Lunasicc) – 6:27
16. "Mo' Brainz" – 0:51
