= Vengeance Is Mine =

Vengeance is mine is a biblical quotation from:

- Deuteronomy 32:35
- Romans 12:19

Vengeance Is Mine may also refer to:

== Film and television ==
- Vengeance Is Mine (1912 film), an American silent film starring Edmund J. Hayes, Ethel Wright, and William Garwood
- Vengeance Is Mine (1916 film), a German silent film directed by Rudolf Meinert
- Vengeance Is Mine (1917 film), an American silent drama film
- Vengeance Is Mine (1935 film), a Hindi film directed by Sarvottam Badami
- Vengeance Is Mine (1949 film), a British film starring Valentine Dyall and featuring Sam Kydd
- Vengeance Is Mine (1967 film), an Italian spaghetti western film
- Vengeance Is Mine, a 1972 American blaxploitation film also known as Night of the Strangler
- Vengeance Is Mine, a 1978 film also known as Death Force
- Vengeance Is Mine (1979 film), a 1979 Japanese film directed by Shōhei Imamura
- Vengeance Is Mine (1984 film), a film by Michael Roemer
- Vengeance Is Mine (1997 film), a film featuring Yukari Oshima
- Sympathy for Mr. Vengeance (literal translation of original Korean title: Vengeance Is Mine), a 2002 South Korean film
- "Vengeance Is Mine" (War of the Worlds), a 1989 episode of War of the Worlds
- I Spit on Your Grave III: Vengeance Is Mine, the fourth film in the I Spit on Your Grave film series
- "Vengeance Is Mine" (Outlander), a 2016 episode of Outlander

== Literature ==
- Vengeance Is Mine (novel), a 1950 novel by Mickey Spillane
- "Vengeance is Mine Inc.", 1980 short story by Roald Dahl

== Music ==
- Vengeance Is Mine (X-Raided album), 2000, or the title song
- Vengeance Is Mine (Mentallo & The Fixer album)
- Vengeance Is Mine, a 2004 album by Q-Unique
- "Vengeance Is Mine", a song by Alice Cooper from Along Came a Spider
- "Vengeance Is Mine", a song by Biohazard from Reborn in Defiance
- "Vengeance Is Mine", a song by Epica from The Score – An Epic Journey
- "Vengeance Is Mine", a song by Iced Earth from The Dark Saga
- "Vengeance Is Mine", English translation for "Mne otmštšenije", a song by KYPCK from Zero
- "Vengeance is mine", a song by Morbid Angel from Covenant
- "Vengeance Is Mine", a song by Sentenced from The Funeral Album
