= EBK4 =

Studio album by Brotha Lynch Hung
- Released: June 27, 2000
- Genre: West Coast hip hop; gangsta rap; hardcore hip hop; horrorcore
- Length: 60:01
- Label: Black Market
- Producer: Phonk Beta, Cevan Segal

Brotha Lynch Hung chronology
Loaded (1997)	EBK4 (2000)	The Virus (2001)

EBK4 is the third studio album by American rapper Brotha Lynch Hung, released through Black Market Records on June 27, 2000, as a follow-up to 1997's Loaded. Some of the songs on the album were not completed (did not have all the verses recorded, etc.) in time for the release date. Due to disputes with the record label over this and other issues, Black Market released the album without the consent of Brotha Lynch Hung, featuring other artists off the label to complete unfinished songs where extra verses were needed. Lynch has mentioned that prior to the album's release, a home invasion took place during which the thieves had taken songs still in progress, most of which appear on this album.

== Overview ==
Despite the controversy surrounding its release, EBK4 is notable for featuring a guest appearance from Snoop Dogg on the track "Dogg Market." It is also notable for Lynch's cover of label-mate X-Raided's track "Every Single Bitch" from his debut album, Psycho Active.

Professional ratings
Review scores
Source	Rating
Allmusic	2/5 stars

== Track listing ==
No.	Title	Producer(s)	Length
1.	"De One Below" (featuring Scrap Metal)	Cevan Segal	0:28
2.	"Catch You" (featuring X-Raided and Cocaine of P.C.O.)	Phonk Beta	3:30
3.	"Hunta Killa" (featuring Kyel of P.C.O.)	Phonk Beta	3:55
4.	"Dramatic" (featuring First Degree the D.E., P-Folks, and Spice 1)	Phonk Beta	3:47
5.	"Dogg Market" (featuring Snoop Dogg)	Phonk Beta	3:36
6.	"Every Single Bitch"	Phonk Beta	4:14
7.	"My Love" (featuring Pook and Shotgun of Triple Beam)	Phonk Beta	5:21
8.	"Naked Cheese" (featuring Chopah of Triple Beam and K5)	Phonk Beta	6:01
9.	"Raw Meat" (featuring Keak da Sneak)	Phonk Beta	2:56
10.	"Xcaliber"	Phonk Beta	5:30
11.	"Can't Have It" (featuring Kronik Dogg of P.C.O.)	Phonk Beta	4:14
12.	"Holding On" (featuring D-Dubb)	Phonk Beta	4:02
13.	"One Time" (featuring Bad Azz)	Phonk Beta	3:46
14.	"Split Yo Face" (featuring Triple Beam)	Phonk Beta	5:48
15.	"Blood on da Rug" (featuring T-Macc of P.C.O.)	Phonk Beta	2:58
Total length:			60:01

== Personnel ==
- Brotha Lynch Hung – vocals
- Phonk Beta – production
- Cedric Singleton – executive producer, album layout
- Khan – photography
- Seasone Zachary – marketing/"Media Assassin"
- Clyde Anthony Polk – project management
- Bad Credit – project management
- Serious F/X – album cover artwork
