= On the one =

On the one may refer to:

- A description of the rhythmic structure of funk music, epitomized by James Brown's call to be "on the one" to his musicians
- "On the One", a song from Coolin' Off, by the funk jam band Galactic
- "On the One", a song from All in a Night's Work, by KC and the Sunshine Band

== See also ==
- On One, a 2005 album by Keak da Sneak
- On-One, a line of bicycle components from Planet X Limited
