= Deified (album) =

Studio album by Keak Da Sneak
- Released: February 19, 2008
- Genre: Gangsta rap; hyphy
- Length: 1:17:13
- Label: AllNDaDoe; Koch
- Producer: CHOPS; Droop-E; The Slapboyz; Traxamillion; Young Mozart; DJ Vlad

Keak Da Sneak chronology
On One (2005)	Deified (2008)	Mobb Boss (2010)

Professional ratings
Review scores
Source	Rating
HipHopDX	2.5/5
Pitchfork	5.8/10
RapReviews	7.5/10

Deified is a solo studio album by American rapper Keak da Sneak. It was released on February 19, 2008 via AllNDaDoe/Koch Records. Production was handled by David "Mozart" Korkis, Traxamillion, CHOPS, Droop-E, The Slapboyz and DJ Vlad. It features guest appearances from Paul Wall, Bra-Hef, Celly Cel, Chingo Bling, Clyde Carson, Daz Dillinger, E-40, Lil' Keke, Lil' Retro, Matt Blaque, Messy Marv, Mistah F.A.B., Prodigy, San Quinn, Scoot, The Alchemist, The Jacka, Too $hort and Yaberation. The album sold 3,800 copies in its first week on shelves, debuting at #196 on the US Billboard 200 chart.

== Track listing ==
No.	Title	Writer(s)	Producer(s)	Length
1.	"Intro"	Charles Bowens; David Korkis	Young Mozart	1:26
2.	"19 Dummy" (featuring Daz Dillinger)	Bowens; Delmar Arnaud; Korkis	Young Mozart	2:59
3.	"Quarterbacking" (featuring The Jacka)	Bowens; Dominick Newton; Korkis	Young Mozart	2:50
4.	"That Go (Remix)" (featuring Prodigy and Alchemist)	Bowens; Albert Johnson; Alan Maman; Korkis	Young Mozart	3:41
5.	"All I Know" (featuring E-40 and Clyde Carson)	Bowens; Earl Stevens; Clyde Carson; Earl Stevens Jr.	Droop-E	3:29
6.	"Stunna" (featuring Lil' Keke)	Bowens; Marcus Edwards; Korkis	Young Mozart	3:23
7.	"Hard Tops & Drops" (featuring Paul Wall and Scoot)	Bowens; Paul Slayton; Korkis	Young Mozart	3:13
8.	"Blurpt"	Bowens; Korkis	Young Mozart	2:50
9.	"X2"	Bowens; Korkis	Young Mozart	2:56
10.	"Nothing Without You" (featuring Messy Marv and Matt Blaque)	Bowens; Gabe Schillinger; Phil Cox	The Slapboyz	3:38
11.	"Oakland" (featuring Mistah F.A.B.)	Bowens; Stanley Cox; Korkis	Young Mozart	4:47
12.	"Ass Chauffeur"	Bowens; Korkis	Young Mozart	2:59
13.	"Playa Like Me" (featuring Too $hort and Celly Cel)	Bowens; Todd Shaw; Korkis	Young Mozart	4:23
14.	"N Fronta Ya Mama House"	Bowens; Korkis	Young Mozart	3:33
15.	"Go Dumb Go Stupid"	Bowens; Korkis	Young Mozart	3:07
16.	"Going Going Gone"	Bowens; Korkis	Young Mozart	2:55
17.	"Stock with Game"	Bowens; Korkis	Young Mozart	3:00
18.	"Her Name"	Bowens; Korkis	Young Mozart	3:51
19.	"I Get It In" (featuring Bra Heff and San Quinn)	Bowens; Bra Heff; Quincy Brooks; Scott Jung	CHOPS	3:58
20.	"Who Started This"	Bowens; Korkis	Young Mozart	3:39
21.	"Drop It on the 1" (featuring Lil' Retro and Yaberation)	Bowens; Korkis	Young Mozart	3:49
22.	"On Citas" (featuring Paul Wall and Chingo Bling)	Bowens; Slayton; Pedro Herrera; Sultan Banks	Traxamillion; DJ Vlad	3:23
23.	"Super Hyphy"	Bowens; Banks	Traxamillion	3:24
Total length:				1:17:13

== Personnel ==
- Sam Bostic – guitar (track 5)
- David "Mozart" Korkis – mixing, mastering
- Paul Grosso – art direction, design, creative direction
- Laurel Dann – A&R
- Marleny Dominguez – management
- Deborah Rigaud – legal
- Jane Minovskaya – production manager
- Regena Ratcliffe – production manager
- Gazelle Alexander – product manager
- Sean Rock – product manager
- Alex Rago – product manager
- Dee Sonaram – promotion
- Shadow Stokes – promotion
- Christian Mariano – marketing direction, video production
- Chris Herche – digital marketing
- David Bosch – press marketing
- Giovanna Melchiorre – press marketing

== Chart history ==
Chart performance for Deified
Chart (2008)	Peak position
US Billboard 200	196
US Top R&B/Hip-Hop Albums (Billboard)	34
US Top Rap Albums (Billboard)	15
US Independent Albums (Billboard)	23
US Heatseekers Albums (Billboard)	4
US Top Tastemaker Albums (Billboard)	14
