= Sneakacydal =

Studio album by Keak da Sneak
- Released: July 13, 1999
- Recorded: 1999
- Genre: West Coast hip hop; gangsta rap
- Length: 52:32
- Label: Moe Doe Entertainment
- Producer: Wilson Hankins a.k.a. Supaflexxx & Lev Berlak; Ant Banks; One Drop Scott

Keak da Sneak chronology
Sneakacydal (1999)	Hi-Tek (2001)

Professional ratings
Review scores
Source	Rating
Allmusic	link

Sneakacydal is the debut studio solo album by American rapper Keak da Sneak. It sold 1,500 copies in its first week out, and did not chart.

== Track listing ==
1. "Intro"- 1:47
2. "Hit 'Em Where It Hurts"- 3:09
3. "Skit"- 1:06
4. "L.W.L."- 4:04 (featuring 3X Krazy)
5. "Jim Hats - 4:02 (featuring Luniz)
6. "No Love"- 4:01
7. "High Tech"- 4:21
8. "Sneakacydal"- 3:52
9. "Skit"- :21
10. "Split Youres"- 4:03 (featuring The WhoRidas)
11. "Sneak Out"- 4:09
12. "Alright Cool"- 3:43
13. "Runnin'"- 4:53
14. "A.O.B."- 4:28
15. "Rydas"- 4:33 (featuring Big Lurch)
