= Blocc Movement =

Studio album by Brotha Lynch Hung & C-Bo
- Released: August 28, 2001
- Recorded: 2000−2001
- Genres: West Coast hip hop; hardcore hip hop; gangsta rap; underground hip hop
- Length: 65:59
- Label: JCOR
- Producers: Bosko; Evil; Floss P; Kreep; LoKei; Mike Mosley; Phonk Beta; Pierce; Shysti

Brotha Lynch Hung chronology
| EBK4 (2000) | Blocc Movement (2001) | The Virus (2001) |

C-Bo chronology
| C-Bo's Best Appearances (2001) | Blocc Movement (2001) | Life as a Rider (2002) |

Professional ratings
Review scores
| Source | Rating |
|---|---|
| AllMusic | 2/5 stars |
| The Source | 3/5 stars |

Blocc Movement is a collaborative album by American rappers Brotha Lynch Hung and C-Bo. It was released August 28, 2001 via JCOR Entertainment. Production was handled by Bosko, Evil, Floss P, Kreep, Lokei, Mike Mosley, Phonk Beta, Pierce and Shysti. It features guest appearances from C.O.S., Art B., Zigg Zagg, Kam, Killa Tay, Phats Bossi, Spice 1, Spider Loc, Tall Can, Tech N9ne and Yukmouth. The album peaked at number 79 on the Billboard 200 and number 20 on the Top R&B/Hip-Hop Albums in the United States.

The album was originally supposed to be the Thug Lordz album with Yukmouth, which was slated for a fall 2000 release. The majority of Yukmouth's verses were removed and replaced with Brotha Lynch Hung's, with Lynch recording while C-Bo was still incarcerated.

== Track listing ==
| No. | Title | Writer(s) | Producer(s) | Length |
|---|---|---|---|---|
| 1. | "Intro" | | | 0:56 |
| 2. | "Gangsta (Fuck a Ho)" (featuring Kam) | Shawn Thomas; Kevin Mann; Craig Miller; Mike Mosley | Mike Mosley | 2:48 |
| 3. | "Follow My Lead" (featuring C.O.S. and Killa Tay) | Mann; Thomas; Chris Mathias; C. Lewis | Evil | 4:53 |
| 4. | "Flippin' Chiccens" | Thomas; Mosley | Mike Mosley | 4:30 |
| 5. | "187 on a Hook" (featuring Tech N9NE) | Thomas; Mann; Aaron Yates; Flossy P | Floss P | 4:25 |
| 6. | "The Watcher" | Mann; Jesse Perez | Shysti | 3:15 |
| 7. | "We All Thug" (featuring C.O.S. and Tall Can) | Mann; Mathias; R. Ross; K. Watson | Lo Kei; Evil | 4:18 |
| 8. | "187 on 24th Street" | Mann; Bosko Kante | Bosko | 5:11 |
| 9. | "Drunken Style" | Mann; Jemal Boyd | Phonk Beta; Evil | 2:27 |
| 10. | "Dedication" | Thomas; Watson | Lo Kei; Pierce | 5:00 |
| 11. | "Divide" (featuring Phats Bossi and C.O.S.) | Thomas; Mann; Late Bankoudagba; Mathias; Mosley | Mike Mosley | 4:28 |
| 12. | "There It Is" | Mann | Kreep | 4:37 |
| 13. | "Down at the Court House (Skit)" (featuring Art B) | | | 0:25 |
| 14. | "Money, Power, Respect" (featuring Spider Loc) | Thomas; Curtis Williams; Flossy P | Floss P | 3:50 |
| 15. | "The Plot" (featuring Zigg Zagg) | Mann; Shawna Coyle Mann | Evil | 2:43 |
| 16. | "Where's My Checc? (Skit)" (featuring Zigg Zagg and Art B) | | | 0:46 |
| 17. | "My Papers" | Mann | Evil | 5:29 |
| 18. | "Kicc the Door In (Skit)" | | | 0:56 |
| 19. | "Don't Stop" (featuring Yukmouth and Spice 1) | Thomas; Mann; Jerold Ellis Jr.; Robert Lee Greene Jr.; Mosley | Mike Mosley | 4:43 |
| 20. | "Outro" | | | 0:19 |
| Total length: | | | | 1:05:59 |

== Charts ==
| Chart (2001) | Peak position |
|---|---|
| US Billboard 200 | 79 |
| US Top R&B/Hip-Hop Albums (Billboard) | 20 |
