= Thizz Iz Allndadoe =

Studio album by Keak da Sneak
- Released: July 18, 2006
- Recorded: 2006
- Genre: Hip hop
- Label: Thizz
- Producers: Keak da Sneak; Mac Dre; Curtis Nelson

Keak da Sneak chronology
Kunta Kinte (2006)	Thizz Iz Allndadoe (2006)	King of tha Supa Dupa Hyphy (2006)

Thizz Iz Allndadoe is a solo album released by rapper, Keak da Sneak. It was his first for Thizz Entertainment, one of the largest Hyphy labels in California.

The album was rated a 5 out of 10 by RapReviews.

== Track listing ==
1. "Who Started Hyphy"- 4:03 (featuring Mac Dre and PSD)
2. "Stunna Shadez On"- 3:22
3. "Again"- 2:47
4. "Allndadoe"- 3:47
5. "Bout It, Bout It"- 2:54
6. "The Originals"- 3:58
7. "4 Freaks"- 4:29 (featuring Mistah F.A.B. and Turf Talk)
8. "Doin' It Well"- 3:58
9. "My Life"- 1:45
10. "What, What"- 3:25 (featuring Messy Marv)
11. "Messenger"- 4:19
12. "F tha Dogg"- 1:50
13. "Undaworld Ties"- 3:59 (featuring Rydah J. Klyde)
