= Dual Committee =

Studio album by Dual Committee
- Released: March 21, 2000
- Genres: Gangsta rap; West Coast hip hop
- Label: Moe Doe Entertainment
- Producers: Alonzo Jackson; Ant Banks; E-A-Ski & CMT; Mike Sexton; Tone Capone

Dual Committee chronology
Real Talk 2000 (2000)	Dual Committee (2000)	20th Century (2000)

Dual Committee is an album by 3X Krazy members Keak da Sneak and Agerman under the name Dual Committee. It was released March 21, 2000, on Moe Doe Records and was produced by Ant Banks, E-A-Ski & CMT, Rick Rock, Alonzo Jackson, Mike Sexton and Tone Capone. 3X Krazy member B.A. did not participate in the recording.

== Track listing ==
1. "Intro" – 2:03
2. "Your Friends" – 4:04
3. "Can't Stop It" – 3:58
4. "Dedicated" – 3:51
5. "Believe It" – 4:01
6. "Skit" – 0:10
7. "R. S." (Hi-Tech Version) – 4:13
8. "Hit the Gas Again" – 4:26
9. "Bring the Pain" – 4:35
10. "Outro" – 1:02
