= That's My Word =

Studio album by Keak da Sneak
- Released: September 13, 2005
- Recorded: 2005
- Genre: West Coast hip hop, hyphy
- Label: Rah Records
- Producer: Keak da Sneak

Keak da Sneak chronology
Town Business (2005)	That's My Word (2005)	Contact Sport (2006)

That's My Word is a solo album released by rapper, Keak da Sneak. It was released on September 13, 2005 for Rah Records. The single "Super Hyphy" made it to No. 40 on the Billboard Rhythmic Top 40 chart.

== Track listing ==
1. "Super Hyphy"- 3:26
2. "What a Relief"- 3:34
3. "Oh Girl"- 3:23
4. "Touch on Me"- 4:02
5. "Somethin' Serious" (featuring Kitt)- 5:01
6. "Hyphie" (featuring Bra Heff)- 3:27
7. "E-Yes" (featuring B.A.)- 4:07
8. "What Does It All Mean" (featuring Tyquan)- 4:04
9. "Ak's & SK's" (featuring Frank Sticks)- 3:26
10. "Super Hyphy" (Remix)- 3:44
