= Retaliation (Keak da Sneak album) =

Studio album by Keak da Sneak
- Released: January 15, 2002
- Recorded: 2001
- Genre: Gangsta rap; West Coast hip hop
- Label: Black Market Records
- Producer: Sean T; Keak da Sneak; One Drop Scott

Keak da Sneak chronology
| The Appearances of Keak da Sneak (2001) | Retaliation (2002) | The Farm Boyz (2002) |

Professional ratings
Review scores
| Source | Rating |
|---|---|
| AllMusic | 3/5 stars |

Retaliation is a solo album by rapper Keak da Sneak. It was released on January 15, 2002, by Black Market Records, and was produced by Sean T, Keak da Sneak and One Drop Scott. It sold 2,500 copies on its first week on shelves.

== Track listing ==
1. "So Quik"- 4:52
2. "No Remorse"- 4:13
3. "Get You Lit"- 4:38
4. "Don't Wanna See Me"- 3:19
5. "Squash Suckers"- 3:28
6. "Welcome to Oakland"- 4:19
7. "In This Game"- 4:10
8. "Shockn Niggaz"- 3:46 (featuring Killa Tay)
9. "It's the Sneak"- 4:13
10. "Industry Rule"- 3:44
11. "Me Me No and Fuck with These"- 3:32
12. "Out My Pocket"- 4:00
13. "Ride Fo This"- 3:02
14. "Got Me Lifted"- 3:43
15. "Da Market"- 4:43
16. "Life Ain't Playin With You"- 4:12 (featuring Agerman)
