= Keak da Sneak (album) =

Studio album by Keak da Sneak
- Released: November 9, 2004
- Recorded: 2004
- Genres: Gangsta rap; West Coast hip hop
- Label: Moe Doe Entertainment
- Producers: E-A-Ski; Tone Capone; D-Dre

Keak da Sneak chronology
Counting Other Peoples Money (2003)	Keak da Sneak (2004)	Town Business (2005)

Keak da Sneak is the self-titled sixth solo album released by rapper, Keak da Sneak. It was released on November 9, 2004 for Moe Doe Entertainment and was produced by E-A-Ski, Tone Capone and D-Dre.

== Track listing ==
1. "East Oakland"- 4:19
2. "Same Ol' Shit"- 3:01
3. "Amigo"- 4:09 (featuring Yukmouth)
4. "All I Need"- 4:34
5. "Hands in the Sky"- 5:01
6. "Fast Lane"- 3:56
7. "Untouchable"- 4:42
8. "Square Ass Nigga"- 2:59
9. "Why"- 4:06
10. "Cream"- 4:37 (featuring Spice 1)
11. "Can't You See"- 4:12
12. "Mind of a Soldier"- 4:10
