= Appearances: Book 1 =

Compilation album by Brotha Lynch Hung
- Released: 2002
- Recorded: 199?-2002
- Genre: West Coast Hip Hop, gangsta rap, horrorcore
- Label: Black Market Records
- Producer: Brotha Lynch Hung

Brotha Lynch Hung chronology
The Virus (2001)	Appearances: Book 1 (2002)	Remains: Book II (2002)

Appearances: Book 1 is a compilation album by rapper Brotha Lynch Hung, released on January 19, 2002, on Black Market Records, It is the first in a trilogy of compilation albums released throughout 2002. After Lynch released his second LP, Loaded, he began a long-standing feud with label head Cedric Singleton over the rights to his back catalog (including 24 Deep, Season Of Da Siccness and Loaded). To compile Book 1, Cedric scraped together a lot of either stolen Lynch songs or songs from other underground rappers' albums that featured Lynch. This is essentially a bootleg; it is rumored Lynch receives no profit on anything Black Market released after Loaded. The vast majority of these songs came from other artists' albums: 'Tremendous' was taken from Sicx's LP, "It's Real" came from Mr. Serv-On's album Life Insurance, 'Candy Wit' Slam' from Dubb Sak's LP, etc.

== Tracks ==
1. "West Coast Parley"
2. "It's Real" (featuring Master P and Mr. Serv-On)
3. "So Serious" (featuring Killa Tay, Marvalous and Lunasicc)
4. "Tremendous" (featuring Sicx and Tall Can)
5. "Holloween" (featuring Delinquents)
6. "Gone Blown" (featuring Young Ridah)
7. "Had To Gat Ya 2001" (featuring Young Droop)
8. "Weapons Of War" (featuring First Degree, Roulette and Loki)
9. "3 Da Hardway" (featuring Loki and Tre 8)
10. "Sicc Wit Shit" (featuring Mr. Doctor)
11. "Candy With Slam" (featuring Dubb Sack)
12. "Betrayed" (featuring Sicx and Undadog)
13. "Psycho Dream" (featuring Gangsta Profile)
14. "None To Die For" (featuring Loki)
15. "Blackula" (featuring First Degree)
