= Setripn' Bloccstyle =

Studio album by Mr. Doctor
- Released: November 21, 1995
- Recorded: 1995
- Genre: Gangsta rap, West Coast hip hop, horrorcore, underground hip hop, G-Funk
- Length: 45:02
- Label: Black Market Records
- Producer: Brotha Lynch Hung, Marcellous "Baloo" Perkins

Professional ratings
Review scores
Source	Rating
Allmusic	1.5/5 stars

Setripn' Bloccstyle is the debut album by Sacramento rapper Mr. Doctor. It was presented by and features Brotha Lynch Hung. It was released on CD and cassette tape.

== Track listing ==
No.	Title	Length
1.	"Setripn'"	0:40
2.	"Bloccstyle" (featuring Brotha Lynch Hung)	4:36
3.	"Plot Murder"	0:33
4.	"Fill 'Em Up"	3:06
5.	"Fucc Yo Side" (featuring Baby Reg, Brotha Lynch Hung)	3:06
6.	"Rollin' Wit GBC"	2:02
7.	"It's All Da Way On"	0:31
8.	"Killa Cap Pilla" (featuring Brotha Lynch Hung)	4:47
9.	"No Bitch" (produced by Marcellous "Baloo" Perkins)	5:02
10.	"Misty Blue Tribute"	0:41
11.	"40 Oz & Chronic Dice" (featuring Brotha Lynch Hung, Foe Loco)	3:42
12.	"She Fucc Everybody"	1:07
13.	"Treat 'Em Like Hoez" (featuring Brotha Lynch Hung)	4:57
14.	"Da Real Deal" (featuring Brotha Lynch Hung)	4:52
15.	"Largest Way 2 Represent" (featuring DJ Kat, Loki)	3:47
16.	"5000 "C'z""	1:33
Total length:		45:02
