= Contact Sport =

Studio album by Keak da Sneak
- Released: February 7, 2006
- Recorded: 2005
- Genre: Hip hop
- Label: Siccness.net
- Producer: Keak da Sneak

Keak da Sneak chronology
On One (2005)	Contact Sport (2006)	Kunta Kinte (2006)

Contact Sport is a solo album released by rapper Keak da Sneak.

== Track listing ==
1. "Bumpers and Rear Ends"- 3:21
2. "You Doing It"- 3:43
3. "Contact Sport"- 3:11
4. "Do That" (featuring I-Rocc)- 3:25
5. "Do Wit You Now"- 3:45
6. "Gettin Money"- 3:08
7. "No Can Do"- 4:00
8. "Not Listening"- 3:53
9. "Shake It"- 3:17
10. "Played You"- 4:01
11. "Aaadddimin" (featuring 12 Gauge Shotie)- 3:22
12. "Super Hyphy" (Remix)- 3:44
13. "Talk a Good One"- 3:05
