= Stackin Chips =

Studio album by 3X Krazy
- Released: April 8, 1997
- Recorded: 1996–97
- Genres: West Coast hip hop; gangsta rap
- Length: 1:13:52
- Label: Noo Trybe
- Producers: Ali Malek; Ant Banks; Bosko; Lev Berlak; Mike Dean; N.O. Joe; One Drop Scott; Spenc; Tone Capone

3X Krazy chronology
Sick-O (1995)	Stackin Chips (1997)	Immortalized (1999)

Singles from Stackin Chips
- 1. "Keep It on the Real" Released: March 1997

Professional ratings
Review scores
Source	Rating
AllMusic	4/5 stars
The Source	2.5/5 stars

Stackin Chips is the debut studio album by American rap group 3X Krazy. It was released on April 8, 1997 through Noo Trybe Records. Production was handled by Tone Capone, One Drop Scott, Ali Malek, Ant Banks, Bosko, Lev Berlak, Mike Dean, N.O. Joe, and Spenc. It features guest appearances from Luniz, Harm, Mr. Spence, Christión, Cydal, E-40, Dru Down, Mike Marshall, Pleasure, Swoop G, and Seagram. The album made it to No. 136 on the Billboard 200, No. 28 on the Top R&B/Hip-Hop Albums and No. 6 on the Top Heatseekers. One single, "Keep It on the Real," peaked at No. 19 on the Hot Rap Tracks, which was based on the 52nd Street's 1985 song, "Tell Me How It Feels."

== Track listing ==
No.	Title	Writer(s)	Producer(s)	Length
1.	"Sickkaluffa"	Lamore Jacks; Charles Williams; Ramone Curtis	One Drop Scott; Spenc; Alonzo Jackson	3:38
2.	"Keep It on the Real"	Anthony Henry	Tone Capone; One Drop Scott	5:58
3.	"Dem Niggas" (featuring Yukmouth)	Jacks; Williams; Curtis; Jerold Ellis	Ali Malek	3:58
4.	"Rollin' 100's" (featuring E-40, Harm and Mr. Spence)	Jacks; Williams; Curtis; Earl Stevens; Rodney Waller; Lance Spencer	N.O. Joe	4:43
5.	"Next Niggas Ho"	Jacks; Williams; Curtis	Tone Capone	4:06
6.	"Can't Fuck With This" (featuring Harm, Seagram and Pleasure)	Jacks; Williams; Curtis; Seagram Miller	Tone Capone	5:38
7.	"Open Your Eyes"	Jacks; Williams; Curtis	Mike Dean	4:16
8.	"Stackin Chips"	Jacks; Williams; Curtis	Tone Capone	5:06
9.	"West Coast Shit"	Jacks; Williams; Curtis; Timothy Gatling; Gene Griffin; Aaron Hall III; Edward Riley	Tone Capone	4:19
10.	"Pistols Blazin" (featuring Yukmouth, Cydal, Swoop G and Dru Down)	Jacks; Williams; Curtis; Ellis	Lev Berlak	6:11
11.	"Stanky Panky" (featuring Numskull and Mr. Spence)	Jacks; Williams; Curtis; Garrick Husbands; Spencer	Bosko	5:31
12.	"Ghetto Soldiers"	Jacks; Williams; Curtis; James Nyx; Marvin Gaye	Tone Capone; One Drop Scott	5:37
13.	"In the Name of Rame" (featuring Mike Marshall)	Jacks; Williams; Curtis	Ant Banks	4:06
14.	"Tired of the Pain" (featuring Christión)	Jacks; Williams; Curtis; William Scaggs; David Lasley; David Foster	Tone Capone	4:57
15.	"Get 'Em" (featuring Cydal)	Jacks; Williams; Curtis	Tone Capone; One Drop Scott	5:06
16.	"2 Lumps or 3"			0:42
Total length:				1:13:52

== Charts ==
Chart (1997)	Peak position
US Billboard 200	136
US Top R&B Albums (Billboard)	28
