= Keak Hendrix =

Studio album by Keak Da Sneak
- Released: December 6, 2011
- Genre: West Coast hip hop; hyphy
- Length: 49:52
- Label: Ehustl Records

Keak Da Sneak chronology
Mobb Boss (2010)	Keak Hendrix (2011)	Cheddar Cheese I Say (2012)

Keak Hendrix is the fifth full-length studio solo album released by Keak Da Sneak on December 6, 2011.

== Track listing ==
Disc 1

1. "We Ready" (featuring Young Lot) - 3:51
2. "Format" - 2:40
3. "They So Wet" - 3:39
4. "Punk Ho" - 3:24
5. "I Do What I Rap About" - 2:54
6. "Rollin" - 3:21
7. "The Weekend" - 2:29
8. "Mane Squeeze" - 3:18
9. "Woofers Knockin" - 2:07
10. "Automatic Wit the Money" (featuring Ike Dolla) - 3:35
11. "Aint Going Nowhere" - 3:24
12. "They Call Me" - 3:13
13. "Really Wit It" - 3:10
14. "Mob Music" - 3:35
15. "If I Wanted" - 2:07
16. "Usual" (featuring Matt Blaque)- 3:05
