= Mannibalector =

Studio album by Brotha Lynch Hung
- Released: February 5, 2013
- Recorded: 2011–13
- Studio: Various: Chapman Recording (Kansas City, Missouri) SoundCap Audio (Sacramento, California) ¡Mayday! Studios (Miami, Florida) Tree Sound Studio (Norcross, Georgia) Funk Volume Basement (Panorama City, California)
- Genre: Hardcore hip hop; horrorcore; gangsta rap
- Length: 63:54
- Label: Strange Music
- Producer: Various: Travis O'Guin (exec.); Seven; Robert Rebeck; NonStop; Axis

Brotha Lynch Hung chronology
Coathanga Strangla (2011)	Mannibalector (2013)	Suicide Tour: Ten Years Later (2014)

Singles from Mannibalector
- 1. "Meat Cleaver" Released: January 15, 2013; 2. "Krocadil" Released: January 29, 2013

Mannibalector is the eighth studio album by American rapper Brotha Lynch Hung. It was released on February 5, 2013, by Strange Music. It serves as the third and final installment of this "Coathanga Strangla" trilogy, following these albums; including Dinner and a Movie (2010) and Coathanga Strangla (2011). It would be his last full-length album for Strange Music, as he left the label in 2015. The album features guest appearances from Wrekonize, Bernz, Yelawolf, COS, Irv Da Phenom, Trizz, Bleezo, G-Macc, Tech N9ne and Hopsin.

== Background ==
Brotha Lynch Hung has been working with record producer Seven for "over a year" producing his new album, called Mannibalector. Seven said, "Lynch's mind works differently", his way of "constructing songs" is different than others. Also that Hung will "have the whole album structure: song titles and everything before we've made any of the songs. It's interesting and different to get to work that way with an artist". Another aspect that was difficult for Hung was to find features that fit into the storyline. Hung picked Yelawolf and Hopsin as they "fit in with their perspective that they had to follow through on". Hung never rejected a beat from Seven "because everything just matched".

== Lyrics and production ==
In an interview with Strange Music, Hung said his "lyrical ability was limited because I had to more so tell stories than mostly worry about lyrics". The album is about an era of his life that's been ended. With Fearnet, Hung discusses about how the character within the album became this serial killer. Hung said "he's lost and friendless at that point, and like I said a lot of that comes from my own life, when I've let a lot of people go and went my way alone", adding to that Hung "used Mannibalector to get out some of those feelings" from his past.

== Reception ==
=== Critical response ===
Professional ratings
Review scores
Source	Rating
AllMusic	4/5 stars
HipHopDX	4/5 stars

Mannibalector received generally positive reviews from music critics. In a positive review AllMusic's David Jeffries writes "Hung is a craftsman, kicking off this horror movie on wax with a TV news report that gives up the back-story and then goes full Hollywood, joining skits, numerous sound effects, and a relentless, blockbuster pace, all making this an album worth avoiding if it's dark." Roman Cooper of HipHopDX noted "Make no mistake, BLH’s emceeing arsenal is still quite impressive. Whether it’s the rapid-fire flows over the frenetic and disturbing strings of 'Krocadil' or steady delivery over extremely minimalist production on 'MDK', Lynch is unquestionably adept at his craft."

== Commercial performance ==
Mannibalector debuted at number 67 on the US Billboard 200, at number 8 on the Top Rap Albums and at number 13 on the Top Independent Albums charts, with first-week sales of 8,000 copies in the United States.

== Track listing ==
No.	Title	Writer(s)	Producer(s)	Length
1.	"Newsflash (Intro)"	Kevin Mann; Michael Summers; Robert Rebeck; Chandra Rebeck; Andrew Ross; Neil Simpson	Seven; R. Rebeck	0:46
2.	"Krocadil"	Mann; Summers	Seven	4:24
3.	"Bacon N Eggs (Skit)"	Mann; Arthur Lea III; Lauren Brinson	R. Rebeck	0:45
4.	"MDK" (featuring Trizz)	Mann; Lea III; Summers	Seven	4:51
5.	"Disappeared"	Mann; Summers	Seven	3:19
6.	"Fucced Up (Skit)"	Mann; Dave Weiner	R. Rebeck	0:20
7.	"Eating You" (featuring Bernz and Wrekonize)	Mann; Bernardo "Bernz" Garcia; Benjamin "Wrekonize" Miller; Summers	Seven	4:44
8.	"Tha Package" (featuring Yelawolf)	Mann; Michael Wayne Atha; Summers	Seven	3:23
9.	"Something About Susan" (featuring COS and Irv Da Phenom)	Mann; Chris "COS" Mathias; Mitchell "Irv Da Phenom" Irving, Jr.; Evan "NonStop" Fountaine; Ramond Ross	NonStop	3:46
10.	"The River (Skit)"	Mann; Donald Robinson; Rebeck	R. Rebeck	1:26
11.	"Can I Have a Napkin?"	Mann; Summers	Seven	3:32
12.	"Mask and Knife" (featuring G Macc and Bleezo)	Mann; Brandon "G Macc" Elston; Brandon "Bleezo" Wade; Summers	Seven	3:49
13.	"Meat Cleaver"	Mann; Summers	Seven	4:52
14.	"I Give Up" (featuring COS)	Mann; Mathias; Justinn "Axis" Patton	Axis	4:11
15.	"Instruments (Skit)"	Mann; Gary Adams	R. Rebeck	1:54
16.	"Stabbed" (featuring Tech N9ne and Hopsin)	Mann; Aaron Yates; Marcus Hopson; Summers	Seven	4:02
17.	"Body On the Floor"	Mann; Summers	Seven	3:52
18.	"Have You Checked the Children? (Skit)"	Mann; Brinson	R. Rebeck	0:24
19.	"Sweeney Todd"	Mann; Summers	Seven	4:43
20.	"Dead Bitch"	Mann; Summers	Seven	4:51
Total length:				1:03:54

Strange Music Pre-order digital bonus tracks
No.	Title	Writer(s)	Producer(s)	Length
21.	"Blood All Over Me"	Mann; Summers	Seven	2:59
22.	"F.B.I." (featuring Tall Cann G and G-Smooth)	Mann; Summers	Seven	4:45

Notes

- Track listing and credits from album booklet.
- "Newsflash" features additional vocals by Seven, Robert Rebeck, Chandra Rebeck, Andrew Ross and Neil Simpson.
- "Bacon N Eggs" features additional vocals by Trizz and Lauren Brinson.
- "Fucced Up" features additional vocals by Dave Weiner.
- "Something About Susan" features additional vocals by Tallcann G.
- "The River" features additional vocals by Don Rob and Robert Rebeck.
- "Mask and Knife" features additional vocals by Alex Glass.
- "Instruments" features additional vocals by G-Smooth.
- "Body On the Floor" features additional vocals by Seven.
- "Have You Checked the Children?" features additional vocals by Lauren Brinson.
- "Sweeney Todd" features additional vocals by Lauren Brinson.
- "Dead Bitch" features additional vocals by Travis O'Guin.

Courtesy

- Yelawolf appears courtesy of Shady/DGC/Interscope Records.

== Personnel ==
Credits for Mannibalector adapted from the album liner notes.

- Richie Abbott – publicity
- Axis – producer
- Tom Baker – mastering
- Aaron Bean – marketing & promotions, street marketing
- Bernz – featured artist
- Bleezo – featured artist
- Brent Bradley – internet marketing
- Lauren Brinson – additional vocals
- Brotha Lynch Hung – primary artist
- Violet Brown – production assistant
- Valdora Case – production assistant
- Jared Coop – merchandising
- COS – featured artist
- Glenda Cowan – production assistant
- Penny Ervin – merchandising
- Braxton Flemming – merchandising
- Evan "NonStop" Fountaine – producer
- G Macc – featured artist
- G-Smooth – additional vocals
- Alex Glass – additional vocals
- Ben Grossi – project consultant, general management
- Mary Harris – merchandising
- Hopsin – featured artist
- Irv da Phenom – featured artist
- Robert Lieberman – legal
- Ryan Lindberg – internet marketing
- Liquid 9 – art direction & design
- Korey Lloyd – production assistant, project management, publicity coordinator
- James Meierotto – photography
- Brett Morrow – internet marketing
- Jeff Nelson – internet marketing
- Cory Nielsen – production assistant
- Jose Ramirez – street marketing
- Chandra Rebeck – additional vocals
- Robert Rebeck – mixing, producer, additional vocals
- Don Rob – additional vocals
- Chris Rooney – internet marketing
- Andrew Ross – additional vocals
- Victor Sandoval – internet marketing
- Brian Shafton – project consultant, general management
- Neil Simpson – additional vocals
- Michael "Seven" Summers – A&R, producer, additional vocals
- Tallcann G – additional vocals
- Tech N9ne – featured artist
- Dawn O'Guin – production assistant
- Travis O'Guin – executive producer, A&R, additional vocals
- Trizz – featured artist
- Dave Weiner – A&R, associate producer, additional vocals
- Wrekonize – featured artist
- Yelawolf – featured artist
