= Immortalized (3X Krazy album) =

Studio album by 3X Krazy
- Released: June 22, 1999
- Genres: Gangsta rap, West Coast hip hop
- Length: 73:49
- Labels: Big Block Records and Champeli Entertainment
- Producers: Tone Capone, Big Deion, DJ Daryll, One Drop Scott, Numskull

3X Krazy chronology
Stackin Chips (1997)	Immortalized (1999)	Real Talk 2000 (2000)

Professional ratings
Review scores
Source	Rating
AllMusic	3/5 stars

Immortalized is the second album by 3X Krazy. It was released on June 22, 1999, for Big Block Records and Champeli Entertainment and featured production from Tone Capone, Big Deion, DJ Daryll, One Drop Scott and Numskull.

== Track listing ==
1. "The Real" (featuring Suga Bear, Reddy B & Lil Dank) – 5:26
2. "The Sickness" – 3:52
3. "Bad Boyz" (featuring Burnie & Mob Figaz) – 5:24
4. "Friday" – 3:54
5. "Pimp Till I Can't Breath" (featuring Eternal) – 4:35
6. "Maria" – 5:44
7. "Kaviealstars" (featuring C-Bo, Otis & Shug) – 4:04
8. "Eliminations" – 4:23
9. "Death Call" – 4:18
10. "Bloodrush" – 4:25
11. "Reactions" – 4:52
12. "Immortalize" (featuring Mob Figaz) – 4:58
13. "Panties-Na-Knot" (featuring Swoop G & 2 Scoops) – 4:31
14. "Murder & Kamikaze" (featuring Swoop G & Eklipze) – 4:03
15. "Fuck Wit Dis" (featuring Lil Tigger) – 4:28
16. "Gaffled Remix" (featuring 2Pac, Eklipze & B N T) – 4:52
