= The Farm Boyz =

Studio album by Keak da Sneak
- Released: October 22, 2002
- Recorded: 2002
- Genres: Gangsta rap; West Coast hip hop
- Label: Out of Bounds Records
- Producers: Keak da Sneak; Big Hollis; Mark Knox

Keak da Sneak chronology
Retaliation (2002)	The Farm Boyz (2002)	Copium (2003)

The Farm Boyz is an album released by rapper, Keak da Sneak. It was released on October 22, 2002, for Out of Bounds Records and was produced by Keak da Sneak, Big Hollis and Mark Knox.

== Track listing ==
1. "Interlude"- 3:21
2. "Go Head Baby"- 4:16
3. "Getta Way"- 4:10
4. "Rap 4 Runnin' the Game"- 3:32
5. "U Not a Hoe"- 5:33
6. "High Tech Fashion"- 4:01
7. "On Mine"- 0:30
8. "Shitin' on Em'- 6:21
9. "U Know U Wit It"- 3:03
10. "Million Dollar Heights"- 3:31
11. "Yadameen"- 3:34
12. "Call Da' Police"- 4:14
