= 24 Deep =

1993 debut EP by Brotha Lynch Hung

EP by Brotha Lynch Hung
- Released: November 8, 1993
- Recorded: May 1992–October 1993
- Genres: Gangsta rap; West Coast hip hop; horrorcore
- Length: 31:07
- Label: Black Market
- Producers: Cedric Singleton (exec.); Kevin Mann

Brotha Lynch Hung chronology
24 Deep (1993)	Season of da Siccness: The Resurrection (1995)

Professional ratings
Review scores
Source	Rating
Allmusic	1.5/5 stars

24 Deep is the debut studio EP by American rapper Brotha Lynch Hung. It was released in 1993 through Black Market Records.

== Track listing ==
- All songs written, produced, mixed and performed by Brotha Lynch Hung

No.	Title	Length
1.	"Thought They Knew" (Intro)	1:54
2.	"24 Deep"	4:13
3.	"Had 2 Gat Ya"	4:27
4.	"The Next Hoe" (Insert)	0:22
5.	"Lose a Hoe, Gain a Hoe"	6:55
6.	"Back Fade"	5:13
7.	"Jackin' 4 Joints" (featuring Shawna Coyle)	1:55
8.	"Walkin' 2 My Funeral" (featuring T.M. Shades and Mia Bruce)	3:59
9.	"Fundamentals of Ripgut Cannibalism" (Outro)	2:05
Total length:		31:07

== Samples ==
- "Thought They Knew (Intro)" contains a sample of Modaji as performed by Harvey Mason.
- "24 Deep" contains sampled drum patterns from Synthetic Substitution performed by Melvin Bliss and melody sampled from I've Been Watching You by Southside Movement.
- "Had 2 Gat Ya" contains samples from Deep Cover by Snoop Dogg and Dr. Dre ("187 on the..." as said by Snoop Dogg) and How I Could Just Kill a Man by Cypress Hill ("Ya know I had to gat ya" said by Sen Dog).
- "Had 2 Gat Ya" also contains a sample of More Bounce to the Ounce as performed by Zapp.
- "Lose a Hoe, Gain a Hoe" contains a sample of "Hold On" as performed by En Vogue.
- "Back Fade" also contains sampled drum patterns from Synthetic Substitution as performed by Melvin Bliss and 6 O'clock DJ (Let's Rock) as performed by Rose Royce.
- "Jackin' For Joints" contains a sample from "Atomic Dog" by George Clinton, "Jungle Love by The Time and "Jackin' For Beats" performed by Ice Cube.
- "Walkin' 2 My Funeral" contains a sample of You Remind Me as performed by Patrice Rushen.
- "Fundamentals of Ripgut Cannibalism (Outro)" also contains a sample of 6 O'clock DJ (Let's Rock) as performed by Rose Royce.

== Chart positions ==
Chart (1993)	Peak position
U.S. Billboard Top R&B/Hip-Hop Albums	91
