= Coathanga Strangla =

Studio album by Brotha Lynch Hung
- Released: April 5, 2011
- Recorded: 2010
- Genre: Hardcore hip hop; horrorcore; gangsta rap
- Length: 1:14:25
- Label: Strange Music
- Producer: Axis; Ben Cybulsky; Brotha Lynch Hung; DJ Epik; Mike Baiardi; Mr. Blap; Phonk Beta; Robert Rebeck; Seven

Brotha Lynch Hung chronology
Dinner and a Movie (2010)	Coathanga Strangla (2011)	Mannibalector (2013)

Professional ratings
Review scores
Source	Rating
AllMusic	3.5/5 stars
HipHopDX	4/5
RapReviews	8.5/10

Coathanga Strangla is the seventh solo studio album by American rapper Brotha Lynch Hung. It was released on April 5, 2011, via Strange Music, making it his second album for the label as well as his second album of the 'Coathanga Strangla' concept trilogy. Production was handled by Seven, Mr. Blap, Phonk Beta, DJ Epik, Axis, Ben Cybulsky, Mike Baiardi, Robert Rebeck, and Brotha Lynch Hung himself. It features guest appearances from C.O.S, Lauren Brinson, Bleezo, Crookwood, Devious, Don Rob, First Degree the D.E., G Macc, Mr. Blap, Skitso, Tech N9ne, Alex Glass, Big NoLove, Brya Akdersen, Irv Da Phenom, Sav Sicc, Tabitha McGlothin and Tall Cann.

The album debuted at number 68 on the Billboard 200, number 18 on the Top R&B/Hip-Hop Albums, number 9 on the Top Rap Albums and number 15 on the Independent Albums, with approximately 7,300 units sold in the first week in the United States. As of April 2011, the album has sold 9,179 copies in the United States.

On February 21 the first song "Mannibalector" was released on the Brotha Lynch Hung blog. On March 4 the single "Spit It Out" was released. On March 9 the single and video "Coathanga" was released.

== Track listing ==
No.	Title	Writer(s)	Producer(s)	Length
1.	"Working Late (Intro)" (featuring Lauren Brinson and Tabitha McGlothin)	Kevin Mann	Phonk Beta	2:16
2.	"The Coathanga" (featuring C.O.S.)	Mann; Chris Mathias	Seven	4:01
3.	"Mannibalector" (featuring Crookwood and C.O.S.)	Mann	Seven	4:17
4.	"Look What I Did (Skit)" (featuring Devious)	Mann	Mr. Blap	0:52
5.	"Look It's a Dead Body"	Mann	DJ Epik	4:33
6.	"Sooner or Later" (featuring Mr. Blap)	Mann; Jay Cotton	Seven	5:29
7.	"Fucc Off Again (Skit)"	Dave Weiner	Ben Cybulsky; Mike Baiardi	0:23
8.	"Suicide Watch" (featuring Devious, Lauren Brinson, First Degree the D.E. and Don Rob)	Mann; Kevin Loggins	Seven	5:37
9.	"Spit It Out" (featuring C.O.S.)	Mann; Mathias	Seven	4:41
10.	"Red Dead Bodies" (featuring G Macc)	Mann; Brandon Elston	Seven	3:58
11.	"Blinded by Desire" (featuring Lauren Brinson)	Mann	Seven	3:36
12.	"Friday Night" (featuring C.O.S.)	Mann; Mathias	Seven	3:40
13.	"The Visit (Skit)" (featuring Lauren Brinson and Don Rob)	Mann	Mr. Blap; Robert Rebeck; Brotha Lynch Hung	1:29
14.	"I C U" (featuring Tech N9ne)	Mann; Aaron D. Yates	Justinn "Axis" Patton	4:45
15.	"I'm Not Perfect" (featuring G Macc, C.O.S. and Crookwood)	Mann; Elston; Mathias; Kenny Rookwood	DJ Epik	5:42
16.	"I Don't Think My Momma Ever Loved Me" (featuring Mr. Blap and Irv Da Phenom)	Mann; Cotton	Seven	3:50
17.	"Eating Fingers" (featuring Skitso, Bleezo, Alex Glass and Brya Akdersen)	Mann	Mr. Blap	1:04
18.	"Therapy Session" (featuring Bleezo, Big NoLove, Sav Sicc and Skitso)	Mann; Brandon Wade; Michael Landon Carraway, Sr.; Michael Landon Carraway, Jr.; Marcell Sanders	Phonk Beta	4:57
19.	"It Happens" (featuring First Degree the D.E. and Tall Cann)	Mann; Michael Colen; Ramon Ross	Seven	4:06
20.	"Takin' Online Orders" (featuring Tech N9ne)	Mann; Yates	Seven	3:46
21.	"Outro" (featuring Lauren Brinson)	Mann	Phonk Beta	1:23
Total length:				1:14:25

== Personnel ==
- Kevin "Brotha Lynch Hung" Mann – vocals, producer (track 13)
- Lauren Brinson – additional vocals (tracks: 1, 8, 11, 13, 21)
- Tabitha McGlothin – additional vocals (track 1)
- Chris "C.O.S." Mathias – additional vocals (tracks: 2, 3, 9, 12, 15)
- Kenny "Crookwood" Rookwood – additional vocals (tracks: 3, 15)
- Kevin "Devious" Loggins – additional vocals (tracks: 4, 8)
- Jay "Mr. Blap" Cotton – additional vocals (tracks: 6, 16), producer (tracks: 4, 13, 17), engineering (tracks: 2–6, 8-20), SFX (tracks: 3–5, 10, 11, 15–18)
- Michael "First Degree The D.E." Colen – additional vocals (tracks: 8, 19)
- Donald "Don Rob" Robinson – additional vocals (tracks: 8, 13)
- Brandon "G-Macc" Elston – additional vocals (tracks: 10, 15)
- Aaron "Tech N9ne" Yates – additional vocals (tracks: 14, 20)
- Mitchell "Irv Da Phenom" Irving Jr. – additional vocals (track 16)
- Marcell "Skitso" Sanders – additional vocals (tracks: 17, 18)
- Brandon "Bleezo" Wade – additional vocals (tracks: 17, 18)
- Alex Glass – additional vocals (track 17)
- Brya Akdersen – additional vocals (track 17)
- Michael Landon "Big NoLove" Carraway Sr. – additional vocals (track 18)
- Michael Landon "Sav Sicc" Carraway Jr. – additional vocals (track 18)
- Ramon "Tall Can" Ross – additional vocals (track 19)
- Jemal "Phonk Beta" Boyd – producer (tracks: 1, 18, 21), engineering (tracks: 1, 18)
- Michael "Seven" Summers – producer (tracks: 2, 3, 6, 8–12, 16, 19, 20)
- Dustin "DJ Epik" Worswick – producer (tracks: 5, 15)
- Ben Cybulsky – producer (track 7), mixing
- Mike Baiardi – producer & engineering (track 7)
- Robert Rebeck – producer (track 13), engineering (tracks: 2, 9, 12, 14, 20)
- Justinn "Axis" Patton – producer (track 14)
- Tom Baker – mastering
- Travis O'Guin – executive producer, A&R
- Dave Weiner – associate producer, A&R
- Ron Spaulding – associate producer
- Liquid 9 – art direction, design
- Gabe Hokins – cover photography
- Nicholas Vedros – photography

== Charts ==
Chart (2011)	Peak position
US Billboard 200	68
US Top R&B/Hip-Hop Albums (Billboard)	18
US Top Rap Albums (Billboard)	9
US Independent Albums (Billboard)	15
