= On One =

Studio album by Keak da Sneak
- Released: 2005
- Recorded: 2005
- Genre: Hip hop
- Label: R.E.X. Entertainment
- Producer: Keak da Sneak

Keak da Sneak chronology
That's My Word (2005)	On One (2005)	Contact Sport (2006)

Professional ratings
Review scores
Source	Rating
Allmusic	link

On One is the 9th studio solo album released by rapper, Keak da Sneak.

== Track listing ==
1. "The O" – 4:36
2. "Same O Thang" – 5:02
3. "Get Doe" – 3:58
4. "High Tonight" – 4:44
5. "Street Stars" – 4:08
6. "Playa Ass Nigga's" – 3:01
7. "Get It Started" – 4:39
8. "Soldierz" – 6:23 (featuring Yukmouth)
9. "Like What" – 4:14 (featuring The Delinquents)
10. "Fuck with These Hoe's" – 4:13
11. "Full Circle" – 4:32 (featuring Kurupt)
