= Town Business =

Studio album by Keak da Sneak
- Released: May 23, 2005
- Recorded: 2004–2005
- Genre: Gangsta rap; hyphy; West Coast hip hop
- Label: Moe Doe Entertainment
- Producer: Big Hollis

Keak da Sneak chronology
Keak da Sneak (2004)	Town Business (2005)	That's My Word (2005)

Town Business is a solo album released by rapper, Keak da Sneak. It was released on May 23, 2005 and was entirely produced by Big Hollis.

== Track listing ==
1. "Scarface Dust"- 3:41
2. "Blind to Get It"- 3:39
3. "Town Business"- 4:34
4. "Get That Dough"- 3:23
5. "T Shirt, Blue, & Nikes Pt. 2"- 3:16
6. "Support Your Own Supply"- 4:53
7. "What a Relief"- 3:45
8. "All My Niggas"- 3:44
9. "Dopehouses & Powder"- 3:13
10. "Leanin'"- 4:37
11. "Lookin at Booty"- 4:08
12. "Yeah!"- 4:47
13. "Light Gray Shit"- 3:53
