= Sick-O =

EP by 3X Krazy
- Released: August 5, 1995
- Genres: Gangsta Rap, G-Funk, West Coast Hip Hop
- Length: 36:17
- Label: Str8 Game Records
- Producer: Tone Capone

3X Krazy chronology
Sick-O (1995)	Stackin' Chips (1997)

Sick-O is an EP by 3X Krazy. It was released on August 5, 1995 for Str8 Game Records and produced by Tone Capone.

== Track listing ==
1. "Hit the Gas" - 5:02 (Featuring Harm)
2. "Somethin' 4 Dat Ass" - 4:08
3. "Sick-O" - 5:53 (Featuring Seagram & Gangsta P)
4. "Hoe Fuckin' Season" - 4:43 (Featuring Father Dom)
5. "Put Me to the Test" - 6:17 (Featuring N-D-Cent)
6. "Sunshine in the O" - 5:07 (Featuring Michael Marshall)
7. "In the Town" - 5:07
