= Mobb Boss =

Studio album by Keak Da Sneak
- Released: May 18, 2010
- Genres: West Coast hip hop; hyphy
- Length: 48:21
- Label: Ehustl Records

Keak Da Sneak chronology
Thizz Iz All N Da Doe Volume 2 (2009)	Mobb Boss (2010)	Keak Hendrix (2011)

Mobb Boss is a solo album released by Keak Da Sneak on May 18, 2010.

== Track listing ==
Disc 1

1. "Mobb Boss" - 0:44
2. "Rims On Everything" - 3:18
3. "Lights Out" - 4:35
4. "One Two Step" - 3:50
5. "Talk Is Cheap" - 4:19
6. "Pop That Thing" - 4:27
7. "After Sex Towel" - 3:22
8. "Team Work" - 4:16
9. "The Man" - 3:29
10. "Go Hard" - 3:10
11. "I Stay" (featuring San Quinn) - 3:31
12. "Gone" - 3:27
13. "Call Me" - 5:06
14. "Outro" - 0:46
