= The New Season =

Studio album by Brotha Lynch Hung & MC Eiht
- Released: January 24, 2006
- Genre: Gangsta rap; West Coast hip-hop
- Length: 61:35
- Label: Real Talk
- Producer: Big Hollis; Brotha Lynch Hung; MC Eiht; Vince V.

Brotha Lynch Hung chronology
Lynch by Inch: Suicide Note (2003)	The New Season (2006)	Dinner and a Movie (2010)

MC Eiht chronology
Veterans Day (2004)	The New Season (2006)	Keep It Gangsta (2006)

The New Season is a collaboration album by American rappers Brotha Lynch Hung and MC Eiht. It was released January 24, 2006 on Real Talk Entertainment. The album was produced by Big Hollis, Brotha Lynch Hung, MC Eiht and Vince V. It peaked at number 27 on the Billboard Independent Albums and at number 81 on the Billboard Top R&B/Hip-Hop Albums. To promote the album, a music video was released for the song, "You Don't Know, Who I Know".

== Critical reception ==
Professional ratings
Review scores
Source	Rating
Allmusic	3.5/5 stars

Allmusic - "...The New Season is a cross-California collaboration between the Sacramento-based rapper and Compton's MC Eiht that's refreshingly free of the usual territory-marking: this is a true collaboration between two gifted MCs, both of whom are working at their respective peaks throughout..."

Tower Records - "...Lynch Hung's tracks have a whiff of old tales retold, relating the various codes of the 'hood and the inevitability of thug life and death. The production is spacious and airy, the beats have a slow West Coast measure and precision..."

== Track listing ==
1. "The New Season [Part 1]" – 1:38
2. "Neighborhood Boyz" – 4:50
3. "That's All U Can Do" – 3:53
4. "Agent Double O Duece 4 Block & CPT (Rest In Piss 2006)" – 5:00
5. "Sticky Sheets" – 3:55
6. "You Don't Know, Who I Know" – 4:43
7. "Dreams" – 3:52
8. "When You Hear The Shots" (Feat. COS) – 4:44
9. "Buy Another Gun" – 5:33
10. "Split Ya Head" – 0:40
11. "Westside Ridin'" – 3:48
12. "War Outside" (Feat. Zagg) – 4:30
13. "California Bangers" – 4:19
14. "Round Here" (Feat. Devious, Lace Leno & Big Slep Rock) – 7:25
15. "The New Season [Part 2]" – 2:45

== Chart history ==
Chart (2006)	Peak position
U.S. Billboard Independent Albums	27
U.S. Billboard Top R&B/Hip-Hop Albums	81
