= Lynch by Inch: Suicide Note =

Lynch By Inch (Suicide Note)

Studio album by Brotha Lynch Hung
- Released: June 10, 2003
- Genre: West Coast hip hop; hardcore hip hop; horrorcore
- Length: 1:36:46
- Label: Siccmade Muzicc
- Producer: Brotha Lynch Hung; Phonk Beta; Mark Knoxx; Lokei; Crookwood; E-Moe; DJ Epic

Brotha Lynch Hung chronology
The Virus (2001)	Lynch By Inch (Suicide Note) (2003)	The New Season (2006)

Professional ratings
Review scores
Source	Rating
Allmusic	3/5 stars

Lynch By Inch (Suicide Note) is the fifth studio album by American rapper Brotha Lynch Hung, released through his own Siccmade Muzicc label on June 10, 2003 as a double album and follow-up to The Virus. It is his first solo album not released on Black Market Records and remains his only independent studio album to date.

== Overview ==
Lynch By Inch (Suicide Note) is the first concept album from rapper Brotha Lynch Hung. Inspired by the (at the time) recent passing of his mother, as noted in the accompanying booklet underneath a picture of her: "You are my inspiration." The album chronicles the depression and events leading up to a fictional suicide attempt by the protagonist.

== Track listing ==
All tracks are written by Brotha Lynch Hung.

Disc one
No.	Title	Producer(s)	Length
1.	"Smoke [scene]"	Brotha Lynch Hung	0:17
2.	"Spydie's Birth"	Lynch	4:11
3.	"Spitz Network" (feat. Yukmouth & C.O.S.)	Lynch	5:51
4.	"I Went From [Intro]"	Phonk Beta	0:56
5.	"I Went From"	Phonk Beta; Lynch	5:57
6.	"Watta" (feat. Lunasicc)	Lynch	4:18
7.	"Art of War" (feat. C.O.S.)	Mark Knoxx	5:54
8.	"Everywhere I Go" (feat. D-Dubb)	Lynch	4:47
9.	"Death Dance"	Phonk Beta	4:08
10.	"Break Ya' Loccs" (feat. Suspicion)	Phonk Beta	5:07
11.	"Reachin' For Fame" (feat. Tallcann G & C.O.S.)	Lynch	4:52
12.	"Bleeding House Mystery" (feat. Zigg Zagg)	Lokei	5:45
13.	"Gun-Runner [scene]"		0:51
14.	"Get Bacc Time"	Lynch	5:05
15.	"Therapy [scene]"		0:58
16.	"My Mind Ain't Right"	Phonk Beta	3:45
17.	"The Meeting [scene]"		0:54
18.	"I Gets Off"	Phonk Beta; E-Moe	4:46
19.	"Any Given Friday" (feat. Phonk Beta)	Crookwood	4:51
Total length:			1:13:03

Disc two
No.	Title	Producer(s)	Length
1.	"The Phone Call [scene]"		0:40
2.	"Tried to Shoot"	Crookwood	3:34
3.	"John Johnson [scene]"		1:06
4.	"Suicide Note"	Lynch	4:20
5.	"Usual Suspects" (feat. E-Moe, Loki, Zigg Zagg, Phonk Beta, C.O.S., Calico, Crookwood, B-Flat, Tallcann G, JV, Low-Down & D-Dubb)	DJ Epic	8:47
6.	"Drunken Style" (feat. Loki)	Phonk Beta	5:15
Total length:			23:41

== Personnel ==
- Brotha Lynch Hung – vocals, production, co-executive producer

Recording personnel

- Phonk Beta – production, project management
- Eric Broyhill – mastering
- A.J. – recording, mixing

Additional personnel

- Art B – co-executive producer
- Loki – photography, layout, CD artwork & design
- Tallcann G – A&R, project management
- E-Moe – project management
- Upheaval – photography
