= Psycho Active =

Studio album by X-Raided
- Released: April 16, 1992
- Recorded: June 1990–March 1992
- Length: 42:24
- Label: Blackmarket
- Producers: X-Raided; Brotha Lynch Hung; Ced Singleton

X-Raided chronology
Psycho Active (1992)	Xorcist (1995)

Psycho Active is the debut solo album by American rapper X-Raided, released April 16, 1992 through Blackmarket Records. Before the album's release, X-Raided and four other individuals, all Crips, were arrested by the Sacramento Police Department for the killing of Patricia Harris, the mother of two Meadowview Bloods' members during a home invasion. Police maintained that the boys intended reprisal against Harris' sons for the killing of two Crips. The weapon that was used to kill Harris was never found, and X-Raided maintains that he is innocent. During the trial, the prosecution cited lyrics from Psycho Active as evidence, and X-Raided was sentenced to 31 years in prison. He was released on parole on September 14, 2018, after serving 26 years in prison.

== Reception ==
Professional ratings
Review scores
Source	Rating
RapReviews	7.5

Steve "Flash" Juon gave the album an overall score of 7.5 in a retrospective review for RapReviews, giving the album's music a score of 8 and X-Raided's lyrics 7. Juon wrote, "What X-Raided has going for him here is a sick selection of samples ranging from Marvin Gaye to Funkadelic to Grover Washington Jr. The sheer volume of clearances required would probably make it impossible to reissue today but makes for a highly enjoyable listen from start to finish. [Psycho Active is] an example of an early 1990s underground rap album with great production, decent yet unremarkable boasting, and a general lack of marketability except to hardcore Cali rap fans of the time."

== Track listing ==
All tracks are written by X-Raided, except where noted.

No.	Title	Writer(s)	Length
1.	"Tha Murder" (Intro)	Brotha Lynch Hung	0:20
2.	"Still Shooting"		4:14
3.	"Call tha Guardz"		3:19
4.	"Who's tha Hoe?"		2:40
5.	"Crazy Than a Mutha Fuck"		3:30
6.	"Every Single Bitch"		4:36
7.	"Fuckin' Wit a Psycho"		6:00
8.	"Bitch Killa"		3:52
9.	"Everybody Killa"		1:01
10.	"Shootcha in a Minute"		4:56
11.	"That's How My Trigga Went" (feat. Brotha Lynch Hung & Sicx)	Brotha Lynch Hung; Sicx	2:11
12.	"That Sickness" (feat. Brotha Lynch Hung, Big-O, Kaos, CYCO)		5:54
Total length:			42:24

== Samples ==
- "Still Shooting"
  - Muddy Waters - Tom Cat
  - Quincy Jones - Listen (What It Is)
  - Ohio Players - Funky Worm
- "Call Tha Guardz"
  - Parliament - Atomic Dog
- "Who's The Hoe?"
  - Rick James - Hard To Get
  - Parliament - Atomic Dog
- "Crazy Than A Mutha Fuck"*
  - The Temptations - Masterpiece
- "Every Single Bitch"
  - Mtume - Hip Dip Skippedabeat
  - Zapp - More Bounce To The Ounce
- "Fuckin' Wit A Psycho"
  - Grandmaster Flash - The Message
  - Rufus Thomas - Breakdown Part. 1
  - Barry White - I'm Gonna Love You Just a Little More Baby
  - Grover Washington, Jr. - Knucklehead
  - N.W.A - Gangsta Gangsta
  - Ice Cube - Once Upon a Time in the Projects
- "Bitch Killa"
  - Isaac Hayes - Do Your Thing
  - Funkadelic - One Nation Under a Groove
- "Everybody Killa"
  - Grover Washington, Jr. - Hydra
- "Shoot Cha In A Minute"
  - Isaac Hayes - No Name Bar
  - Marvin Gaye - Inner City Blues (Make Me Wanna Holler)
- "That's How My Trigga Went"
  - LL Cool J - Mama Said Knock You Out
- "That Siccness"
  - Zapp - More Bounce To The Ounce
  - Marvin Gaye - "T" Stands For Trouble
  - Marvin Gaye - "T" Plays It Cool
  - Yvonne Fair - Let Your Hair Down
