= Dinner and a Movie (album) =

Studio album by Brotha Lynch Hung
- Released: March 23, 2010
- Genre: West Coast hip hop; hardcore hip hop; horrorcore; gangsta rap
- Length: 77:40
- Label: Strange Music
- Producer: Travis O'Guin (exec.)

Brotha Lynch Hung chronology
The New Season (2006)	Dinner and a Movie (2010)	Coathanga Strangla (2011)

Dinner and a Movie is the sixth studio album by American rapper Brotha Lynch Hung. It was released on March 23, 2010, by Strange Music.

== Commercial performance ==
The album debuted at number 69 on the US Billboard 200, selling 7,900 copies in its first week of release. It is his best debut on the charts since his album Loaded (1997). Dinner and a Movie sold 3,100 copies in its second week of sales, bringing total sales to 11,000 copies. According to an interview with the Strange Music's Travis O’Guin, the album was under-shipped by retailers. Strange Music was planning to have this shipped between 35,000 and 40,000 copies, and yet it only have sold 12,120 units that were shipped due to difficulties with their distributor, Universal Fontana. To date, the album has sold over 45,000 copies in the US.

== Critical reception ==
Professional ratings
Review scores
Source	Rating
Allmusic	4/5 stars
HipHopDX	4/5 stars
RapReviews	(9/10)
JuggaloNews	(favourable)

Dinner and a Movie received critical acclaim from music critics. David Jeffries of Allmusic remarked that Brotha Lynch Hung is "not only on top of his game on this 2010 effort, but he’s also found a perfect match when it comes to labels." Jeffries also praised the plot, mentioning that the story "goes from gross to scary to sympathetic and personal, and then back again, all without losing a step or trying your patience." HipHopDX also gave the album a positive review, saying that its "honesty and delivery that mixes with the horror make this album both a brilliant comeback story, and a career milestone." iHipHop affirmed this, describing Dinner and a Movie as "one of the best albums of 2010 thus far, and is easily the most polished effort in Brother Lynch Hung's catalogue." All three reviewers gave the album four stars out of five.

== Track listing ==
No.	Title	Producer(s)	Length
1.	"The Interrogation (Intro)" (featuring First Degree The D.E. & Don Rob)	Brotha Lynch Hung; Robert Rebeck	1:14
2.	"Colostomy Bag" (featuring C-Lim & G-Macc)	Axis	4:05
3.	"D.O.A." (featuring First Degree The D.E.)	Seven	5:37
4.	"Fucc Off! (skit)" (featuring Record Executive)	Brotha Lynch Hung; Robert Rebeck	0:34
5.	"Sit In That Corner Bitch!"	DJ Epik	3:03
6.	"I Know Who Did Dis (skit)" (featuring First Degree The D.E., Don Rob & C.N.I.)	Brotha Lynch Hung; Robert Rebeck	1:05
7.	"Murder Over Hard (featuring G-Macc) + End Skit (featuring BZO)"	Axis	7:37
8.	"G (skit)"	Brotha Lynch Hung; Robert Rebeck	0:28
9.	"I Tried To Commit Suicide + End Skit" (featuring G-Macc)	Young MC	5:44
10.	"Split Personality" (featuring G-Macc)	Axis	4:16
11.	"Meat + End Skit" (featuring First Degree The D.E. & G-Macc)	Axis	5:12
12.	"Siccem!" (featuring First Degree The D.E. & G-Macc)	Freddy Machete	6:14
13.	"Don't Worry Momma, It's Just Bleeding (featuring Tech N9ne, Krizz Kaliko & First Degree The D.E.) + End Skit (featuring C-Lim, BZO & G-Macc)"	Seven	5:34
14.	"The Police Is Here! Ama Hit U Bacc (skit)" (featuring Don Rob & Ron Danzy)	Brotha Lynch Hung; Robert Rebeck	0:44
15.	"I Plotted (My Next Murder)"	N-Pire	3:13
16.	"Nutbagg" (featuring First Degree The D.E.)	Seven	5:28
17.	"Highspeed (skit)" (featuring Don Rob & Ron Danzy)	Brotha Lynch Hung; Robert Rebeck	0:53
18.	"I Heard That Song B 4 (featuring C-Lim, Tall Cann G & COS) + End Skit (featuring G-Smooth)"	Freddy Machete	5:44
19.	"I Hate When Niggaz Get On The Phone When They Around Me (skit)"	Axis	1:38
20.	"Anotha Killin'" (featuring Snoop Dogg & Tha Dogg Pound)	Brotha Lynch Hung	6:10
21.	"Ama Catch Up (skit)" (featuring First Degree The D.E. & Ron Danzy)	Brotha Lynch Hung; Robert Rebeck	1:44
22.	"We Played You Like A Violin (skit)" (featuring C.N.I. & First Degree The D.E.)	Brotha Lynch Hung; Robert Rebeck	1:23
Total length:			77:40

Strange Music Pre-order digital bonus track
No.	Title	Producer(s)	Length
23.	"She Thinks I'm a Psycho"	Phonk Beta	4:20

== Chart positions ==
Chart (2010)	Peak position
US Billboard 200	69
US Top R&B/Hip-Hop Albums (Billboard)	18
US Top Rap Albums (Billboard)	6
