= Loaded (Brotha Lynch Hung album) =

Studio album by Brotha Lynch Hung
- Released: September 16, 1997
- Recorded: 1996–1997
- Studio: Siccmade House; Da Laboratory; Crystal Clear Studio (Sacramento, CA); Enharmonik Studios (Sacramento, CA)
- Genre: Hip-hop
- Length: 1:12:08
- Label: Black Market; Priority
- Producer: Siccmade Muzicc; First Degree the D.E.

Brotha Lynch Hung chronology
Season of da Siccness (1995)	Loaded (1997)	EBK4 (2000)

Professional ratings
Review scores
Source	Rating
AllMusic	4/5 stars

Loaded is the second solo studio album by American rapper Brotha Lynch Hung. It was released on September 16, 1997 via Black Market/Priority Records. Produced by Siccmade Muzicc (Brotha Lynch Hung and Phonk Beta) and First Degree the D.E., it features guest appearances from D-Dubb, First Degree the D.E., Phonk Beta, E-40, Ice-T, Kokane, Loki Excelsior, P. Folkz a.k.a Roulette, Polo da Trigga Man, Swartzaniggaz, Twamp Dog and Zigg Zagg. The album debuted at number 28 on the Billboard 200 and number 9 on the Top R&B Albums charts in the United States. Along with a promotional single, accompanying music video was released for the song "One Mo Pound".

== Track listing ==
All tracks are written by Kevin Mann.

No.	Title	Producer(s)	Length
1.	"Siccmade House"	First Degree the D.E.	1:27
2.	"My Soul to Keep" (featuring Kokane)	Brotha Lynch Hung	3:18
3.	"Die 1 by 1"	Phonk Beta	4:39
4.	"One a da Las Sicc"	Brotha Lynch Hung	7:15
5.	"Situation" (featuring E-40 and Twamp Dog)	Brotha Lynch Hung	6:22
6.	"Heatas" (featuring First Degree the D.E., Polo Da Trigga Man and P-Folks)	Phonk Beta	5:44
7.	"Did It and Did It" (featuring Phonk Beta and D-Dub)	Siccmade Muzicc	6:34
8.	"Went Way" (featuring Tall Cann)	Phonk Beta	3:23
9.	"Thatz What I Said" (featuring Loki and D-Dub)	Brotha Lynch Hung	4:04
10.	"Feel My Nature Rize" (featuring Swartzaniggaz)	Brotha Lynch Hung	5:20
11.	"One Mo Pound" (featuring D-Dub)	Brotha Lynch Hung	4:50
12.	"On My Brief Case" (featuring Zigg Zagg and Phonk Beta)	Phonk Beta	8:13
13.	"Secondz a Way" (featuring Ice-T and First Degree the D.E.)	Phonk Beta	7:56
14.	"Bonus Trackz" (performed by Sicx)		3:03
Total length:			1:12:08

== Personnel ==
- Kevin "Brotha Lynch Hung" Mann – vocals, producer (tracks: 2, 4, 5, 7, 9-11)
- Jerry B. "Kokane" Long, Jr. – vocals (track 2)
- Earl "E-40" Stevens – vocals (track 5)
- Twamp Dog – vocals (track 5)
- Michael "First Degree The D.E." Colen – vocals (tracks: 6, 13), producer (track 1)
- Polo Da Triggaman – vocals (track 6)
- Robert Lawrence "P-Folks"/"Roulette" Pierce III – vocals (track 6)
- Jemal "Phonk Beta" Boyd – vocals (tracks: 7, 12), producer (tracks: 3, 6-8, 12, 13)
- D. Dubb – vocals (tracks: 2, 7, 9, 11, 13, 14)
- Ramon "Tall Can" Ross – vocals (tracks: 8, 10)
- Jesse "Loki" Caverly – vocals (track 9)
- Chris "C.O.S." Mathias – vocals (track 10)
- John "Fig Naytion" Coleman – vocals (track 10)
- Maxmillian Levec "Sicx" Kunitz – vocals (tracks: 10, 14)
- Shawna "Zigg Zagg" Coyle-Mann – vocals (track 12)
- Tracy "Ice-T" Marrow – vocals (track 13)
- Cedric Singleton – executive producer, graphic art, photography

== Charts ==
Chart (1997)	Peak position
US Billboard 200	28
US Top R&B Albums (Billboard)	9
