= The Virus (album) =

Studio album by Brotha Lynch Hung
- Released: November 13, 2001
- Genre: Hardcore hip hop; horrorcore; gangsta rap
- Length: 53:47
- Label: Black Market
- Producer: Cedric Singleton (exec.)

Brotha Lynch Hung chronology
EBK4 (2000)	The Virus (2001)	Lynch by Inch: Suicide Note (2003)

The Virus is the fourth studio album by American rapper Brotha Lynch Hung, released through Black Market Records on November 13, 2001. The Virus is the follow-up to EBK4. This album was rumored to have been released without the consent of Lynch, much like its predecessor, due to ongoing disputes with Black Market Records. It was Lynch's final studio album released through Black Market Records, although there would be several subsequent compilations released on the label.

== Track listing ==
No.	Title	Length
1.	"Out Break" (Intro)	0:28
2.	"I'm Like"	1:48
3.	"Sicc & High" (featuring Ballin' A$$ Dame)	4:00
4.	"Lay Low" (featuring Lethal)	4:18
5.	"West Nile Virus" (Interlude)	0:12
6.	"Gotta Die Soon"	4:28
7.	"Never Road With Me" (featuring C.O.S. & Loki)	6:00
8.	"In My Cup" (featuring E-Moe)	3:48
9.	"Die on the Cross"	2:51
10.	"Westside Dirty South" (featuring Mr. Skrilla)	4:43
11.	"Mark" (Interlude)	1:01
12.	"One of Us" (featuring Loki & Sicx)	3:13
13.	"Modern Crimes" (featuring C.O.S.)	4:15
14.	"RU Ready" (featuring Fig Naytion)	3:07
15.	"Explicit Encounter" (featuring South Side Posse)	4:55
16.	"Chico [Freestyle]" (featuring TallCann G & Phonk Beta)	3:09
17.	"Bonus" (Cilla Caine Promo Clips)	1:39
Total length:		53:47

== Charts ==
Chart	Peak position
US Top R&B/Hip-Hop Albums	71
