= 3X Krazy =

Former American West Coast rap group

- Origin: Oakland, California, U.S.
- Genre: West Coast hip hop
- Years active: 1994–2000, 2022
- Label: Noo Trybe Records
- Past members: B.A. Agerman; Keak da Sneak

3X Krazy (pronounced 3-Times Crazy) was an American hip hop group formed in Oakland, California in 1994. The group consisted of members Keak da Sneak, B.A. and Agerman. They were signed to Noo Trybe Records.

== History ==
=== Founding ===
3X Krazy was formed in 1994 and was signed to Str8 Game Records. Prior to the formation of 3X Krazy, Agerman and Keak da Sneak were a duo known as Dual Committee. As Dual Committee, they received their first record deal with AWOL Records. Although an album was never released under AWOL Records, Dual Committee appeared on two songs on fellow label-mate C-Bo's second release, The Autopsy. After parting ways with AWOL, B.A., aka Lamore Jacks (then known as Bart AKA Mr Kamikaze) joined the group and 3X Krazy was formed.

=== 1995-2003 ===
The group's debut EP Sick-O was released in 1995, and although not a commercial success, allowed the group to attract the attention of a major record label, Virgin Records, who signed the group in 1996. 3X Krazy's only release for Virgin was 1997's Stackin Chips, which would prove to be the group's most successful release, making it to 136 on the Billboard 200, 28 on the Top R&B/Hip-Hop Albums and 6 on the Top Heatseekers album charts. 3X Krazy would later release 1999's Immortalized and 2000's Real Talk 2000 before disbanding. In 2003, 3X Krazy released their fifth album Flowamatic-9, which featured remixed songs from their first album as well as previously unreleased songs.

=== 2022 ===
In July 2022, 3X Krazy performed together for the first time in 10 years.

=== Influence ===
In his 1996 track "Record Haters", rapper E-40 credits 3X Krazy with teaching him the phrase "fa sheezy", birthing a new way of speaking. In 2022, E-40 reconfirmed this.

=== Solo careers ===
All three members have pursued solo careers: B.A. has released 4 albums, Agerman has released 9 albums featuring Christian rap, while Keak da Sneak has released almost 20 albums and several mixtapes.

== Discography ==
=== Studio albums ===
- Stackin Chips (1997)
- Immortalized (1999)
- Real Talk 2000 (2000)

=== Compilation albums ===
- The Best of 3X Krazy - 3 x 4 Life (2000)
- Best of 3X Krazy, Vol. 2 (2002)
- Flowamatic-9 (2003)
- For Your Mind (2011)

=== Extended plays ===
- Sick-O (1995)

=== Side projects ===
- Dual Committee – Dual Committee (2000)
