= Black Market Records =

American record label

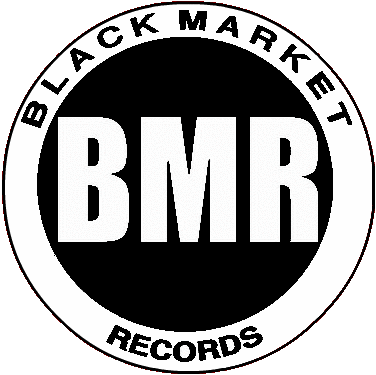
- Distributor: EMPIRE
- Genre: Hip hop
- Country of origin: United States
- Location: Sacramento, California
- Official website: blackmarketrecords.com

Black Market Records is an American record label based in Sacramento, California, founded in 1989. Its acts included Brotha Lynch Hung and X-Raided. Black Market Records is an independent label.

== History ==
Black Market Records was founded in 1989 by Cedric Singleton. In 1992 the label released Sacramento rapper X-Raided's album "Psycho Active" featuring Brotha Lynch Hung. In 1993 the label released Brotha Lynch Hung's EP 24 Deep, which rose to no. 91 on Billboard's Top R&B/Hip-Hop Albums chart, the label's first album to chart. Brotha Lynch Hung later released "Season of da Siccness", the label's second album to chart. After Lynch released his second LP, Loaded, he began a long-standing feud with label head Singleton over the rights to his back catalog.

During the sessions of EBK4, a home invasion took place during which the thieves had taken songs still in progress. Due to the disputes, Black Market released EBK4 without Lynch's permission, using other artists off the label to complete unfinished songs where extra verses were needed. This practice continued with Brotha Lynch's catalog including the solo album The Virus in 2001, and three compilations, Appearances: Book 1, Remains: Book II, and Book III, in 2002. Brotha Lynch Hung left Black Market in 2003. X-Raided left Black Market after his contract was fulfilled in 2000.

== Acts ==
Current

- Friction
- Gatorman
- Hanabal
- Insanity
- Jacavelli 190
- Luchiano Brigante
- Nicca Sicc
- Pharaoh Davinci
- Young Dooby
- Yung Roe
- Sha Hef
- Daddy Andre
- Nina Roz
- Tarel Tala
- Neliah
- Emilian Starz
- Nandeboyz
- Johnny Benzx
- Kwesi Mafia
- Khemi Tunez
- AGS Remedy
- Marck Don
- Junior Gentle
- Zari Dancers
- Felista Da Superstar
- Riff
- Rako Gynius
- Legion East
- King Baganda
- Beni Boyz
- Dynaso Wegoso

Former

- 187
- The 916 Alliance
- Bandana tha Ragg
- B.P.M.
- Black Dynasty
- Black Rhino
- Brotha Lynch Hung
- C-Bo
- Cold World Hustlers
- D-Flex
- Daz Dillinger
- DC Ray
- Doomsday Productions
- Endangered Species
- Fed-X
- Foe
- G-Macc
- Gangsta Dre
- Ganksta NIP
- Habeas Corpus
- Keak da Sneak
- Kock D ZEL
- Mr. Doctor
- Mozzy
- P.C.O.
- Pizo
- Sicx
- Triple Beam
- W.B.K. Mobb
- X-Raided
