= X-Raided =

American rapper (born 1974)

- Born: Anerae Veshaughn Brown; July 30, 1974 (age 52)
- Origin: Sacramento, California, U.S.
- Genre: Gangsta rap
- Occupations: Rapper; songwriter
- Years active: 1989–present
- Labels: Strange Music; Bloc Star; BMG; Black Market

Anerae Veshaughn Brown (born July 30, 1974), better known by his stage name X-Raided, is an American rapper. In 1992, Brown was sentenced to 31 years in prison on murder charges, which Brown denied, maintaining his innocence. The lyrics of his debut album, Psycho Active, was submitted as evidence by the prosecutors. Subsequently, Brown continued to record rap songs in prison, until being released on parole in 2018, 26 years into his sentence. He was later signed with Strange Music.

== Biography ==
Brown was raised by his mother, Shirley James 'Jaz' Brown, a clerk at the Sacramento County courthouse. Brown was raised on the south side of Sacramento and subsequently joined the Garden Blocc Crips which is a block carved out by Florin Road, Meadowview Road, 24th Street and 29th Street. X was from 24th Street. In 1992, Brown released his debut album, Psycho Active, before being arrested in March with four other Crips for the killing of Patricia Harris during a home invasion, with the prosecution citing Brown's lyrics in his trial, accusing Brown of premeditated murder. The weapon that was used to kill Harris was never found, and Brown maintains that he is innocent.

Brown's second album, Xorcist, was recorded over the phone while he was in jail awaiting trial. He was later sentenced to 31 years in prison. His third album, Unforgiven, was recorded on a DAT recorder smuggled in by a prison guard. Brown also operated a record label, Bloc Star Entertainment from prison. The recordings Brown made while in prison documented the maturation of Brown's psychological development as he processed the gravity of his imprisonment. In 2010, Brown was stabbed seven times after he refused to produce a rap album for a gang of other prisoners.

Brown was paroled on September 14, 2018 after serving 26 years in prison, due to a letter of support from Lyle and Erik Menendez, whom Brown had befriended in prison, who wrote that Brown "has developed into a kind and patient person, rooted in integrity, and passionate about his ideas." Brown expressed remorse for his past criminal activity, and expressed the intention leading a new life as a changed man, as well as marking a change in his career and lyrical style. After being released from prison, Brown signed with BMG Rights Management. In 2022, Brown signed with Strange Music.

== Style and influences ==
Brown, reflecting on his early music, described his younger self as a "stereotypical rapper" that was "trying to be the toughest, hardest guy, writing a lot of fantastical music in the vein of the Geto Boys." Steve "Flash" Juon, retrospectively reviewing Brown's debut for RapReviews, described Brown's lyrics as "decent yet unremarkable boasting". Brown cited N.W.A and Ice Cube as his influences at this stage in his career. After his incarceration, Brown's lyrical influences shifted to James Baldwin, Langston Hughes and W.E.B. DuBois.

== Discography ==
=== Solo albums ===
- Psycho Active (1992)
- Xorcist (1995)
- The Unforgiven: Vol. 1 (1999)
- Speak of the Devil (2000) as Nefarious
- Vengeance Is Mine (2000)
- The Initiation (2001)
- And He Shall Appear (2001)
- Deadly Game (2002)
- These Walls Can Talk (2002)
- The Unforgiven Vol. 2: Assisted Suicide (2009)
- Unforgiven Vol. 3: Vindication (2011)
- Sacramentally Disturbed (2012)
- Psychoactive 2 (2014)
- Aneraé VeShaughn – The Execution Of X-Raided (2018) as Aneraé VeShaughn
- California Dreamin (2019)
- There Will Be a Storm (2020)
- A Prayer in Hell (2023)
- A Sin in Heaven (2024)
- A Prophecy in Purgatory (2025)

=== Collaboration albums ===
- City of Kings with Kingpen (2002)
- Ignition with Loki (2007)
- Bloc Bizniz with Bloc Star (2010)
- Family Matters with Luni Coleone (2021)

=== Compilation albums ===
- X-Ology: The Best of X-Raided (2001)
- The X-Filez, Vol. 1 (2003)
- The X-Filez, Vol. 2 (2004)
- The X-Filez, Vol. 3 (2004)
- The Unforgiven Vol. 2.5: Assisted Suicide [Collector's Edition] (2010)

=== Mixtapes ===
- Sacrifice Mixtape (2012)
- Psychotic Activity (2014)

=== Extended plays ===
- Niggaz In Black (1991)
- The Eternally Unforgiven Project (2009)
- A Gun With a Body on It with Smigg Dirtee (2015)
