= Brotha Lynch Hung =

American rapper, songwriter, and record producer (born 1969)

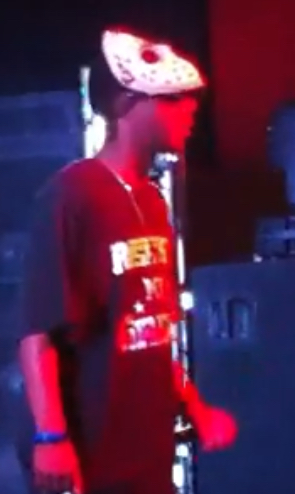
- Mann performing in 2011

Background information
- Born: Kevin Danell Mann; January 10, 1969 (age 57)
- Origin: Sacramento, California, U.S.
- Genres: Hip-hop; hardcore hip-hop; death rap; gangsta rap
- Occupations: Rapper; record producer; songwriter
- Years active: 1986–present
- Labels: Priority; EMI; Madesicc Muzicc/Siccmade Muzicc; Strange Music; Black Market
- Website: Madesicc.com

Kevin Danell Mann (born January 10, 1969), known professionally as Brotha Lynch Hung, is an American rapper, songwriter, and record producer from Sacramento, California. Known for his explicitly graphic and violent lyrics which include vivid descriptions of cannibalism, murder, rape, infanticide, dismemberment, and necrophilia, he is a horrorcore artist. Due to the nature of his lyrics, his music is often compared to a slasher film. He is also a 24th Street Garden Blocc Crip gang member, which is a Crip-affiliated street gang based in Meadowview, Sacramento.

== Early life ==
Mann grew up in Sacramento. He became a fan of East Coast rappers such as Rakim and Slick Rick. He started rapping at the age of 13. He became a member of the 24th Street Garden Blocc Crips by age 16 during the 1980s. He was once shot in the side after trying to break up a confrontation between a Crip and a Blood at a house party; the bullet was never removed.

== Career ==
=== Musical style ===
Mann is credited as being a major pioneer of the horrorcore rap genre, though Mann has claimed that his style is less literally “horrorcore” and instead falls more directly under his own sub-category of rap called "rip gut", which (usually) emphasizes graphic violence.

The rip gut genre reportedly stemmed from Mann's love of meat, but the lyrical style is also sometimes associated with or connected to the common thoughts and feelings experienced during manic and/or violent states of mind brought on by the use of certain illicit drugs such as phencyclidine (PCP).

=== 1993–2002: Black Market Records ===
In 1993, Mann signed to Black Market Records and released his debut EP, 24 Deep. followed by the album Season of da Siccness in 1995. 24 Deep reached No. 91 on Billboard's R&B/Hip-Hop Albums chart, and Season of da Siccness reached No. 26.

Mann appeared on several No Limit Records 1997 releases such as West Coast Bad Boyz II, I'm Bout It, and Mr. Serv-On's Life Insurance. He wrote and produced all of his appearances.

2000 marked the release of Mann's first and only starring role in a film, Now Eat, a horror comedy based on his music, while an album of the same name was released to coincide with the film.

After Mann released his second LP, Loaded, he began a long-standing feud with label head Cedric Singleton over the rights to his back catalog. Singleton released Mann's next album EBK4 without Mann's permission, using other artists off the label to complete unfinished songs. This practice continued with his next solo album The Virus in 2001, and three compilations, Appearances: Book 1, Remains: Book II, and Book III, in 2002.

=== 2003–2008: Lynch by Inch: Suicide Note, The Ripgut Collection and Snuff Tapes ===
Mann left Black Market in 2003 and had three releases on different record labels during the next few years. He released Lynch by Inch: Suicide Note in June 2003 under Madesicc Music. He then released The Ripgut Collection compilation on Madesicc in 2007 and Snuff Tapes "mix tape" in 2008 available on Siccness.net. Both releases enter the Top R&B/Hip-Hop Albums peaking at 55 and 78 respectively.

=== 2009–2013: Strange Music ===
In May 2009, Mann signed a contract with Strange Music. He released three albums on the label, Dinner and a Movie (2010), Coathanga Strangla (2011), and Mannibalector (2013). The label offered to extend his contract after the third album was released, but he decided to stay on his own label Madesicc Musicc.

=== 2013–present: Madesicc Musicc ===
After leaving Strange Music, Mann released several independent EPs and a collaboration album with Ren Da Heatmonsta titled Premeditated (2017).

In 2023, Mann released a compilation album titled Choice Kuttz: Da Best of Brotha Lynch Hung, marking his return to the hip-hop scene.

== Discography ==
Studio albums

- Season of da Siccness: The Resurrection (1995)
- Loaded (1997)
- EBK4 (2000)
- The Virus (2001)
- Lynch by Inch: Suicide Note (2003)
- Dinner and a Movie (2010)
- Coathanga Strangla (2011)
- Mannibalector (2013)
- Season of da Siccness 2: Kevlar (2024)

Collaborative albums

- Blocc Movement (with C-Bo) (2001)
- The Plague (with Doomsday Productions) (2002)
- Uthanizm (with Tall Cann G) (2003)
- Trigganometry (with COS as Suspicion) (2004)
- The New Season (with MC Eiht) (2006)
- Suspicion, Vol. 2 (with COS) (2009)
- Premeditated (with Ren Da Heatmonsta) (2017)
