= Keak da Sneak =

American rapper (born 1977)

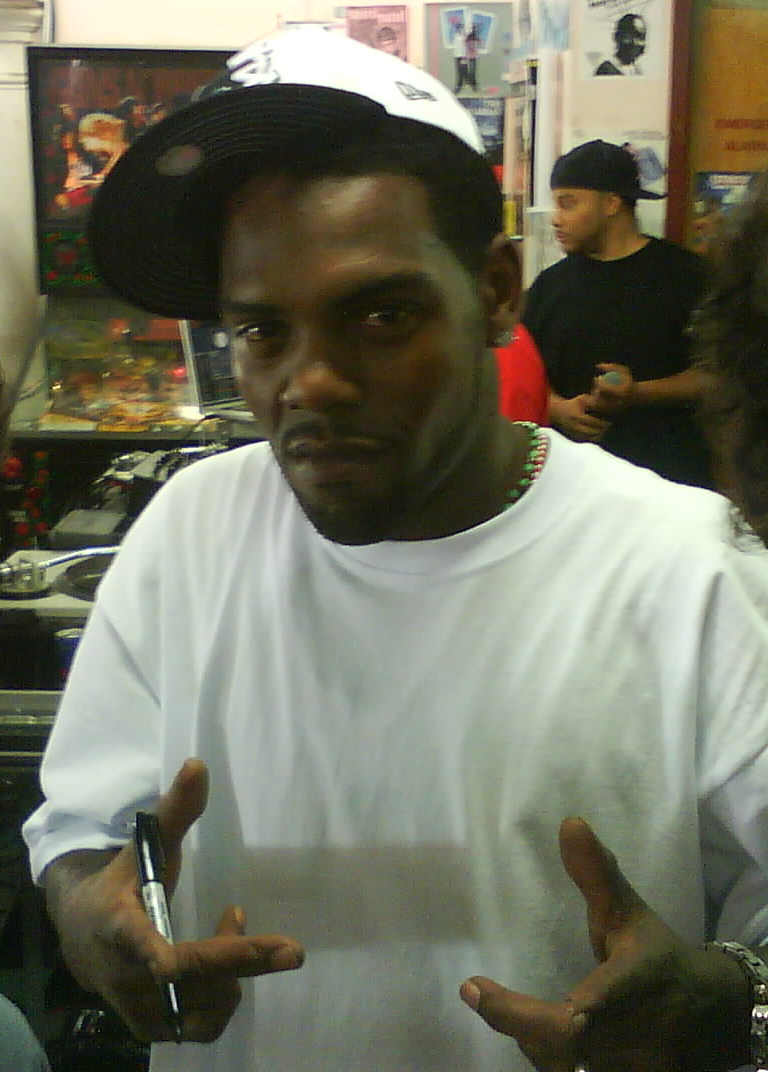
- Keak da Sneak in 2008

Background information
- Also known as: Keak Da Sneak
- Born: Charles Kente Bowens; October 21, 1977 (age 49); Brewton, Alabama, U.S.
- Origin: Oakland, California, U.S.
- Genres: West Coast hip-hop; hyphy
- Occupations: Rapper; songwriter
- Years active: 1992–present
- Labels: E1; Koch; Thizz; Moe Doe; Black Market; Out of Bounds; R.E.X.; AllNDaDoe; Ehustl
- Formerly of: 3X Krazy; Dual Committee

Charles Kente Williams (né Bowens; born October 21, 1977), better known by his stage name Keak da Sneak, is an American rapper from Oakland, California. He is best known for his guest appearance on E-40's 2006 single "Tell Me When to Go", which peaked within the top 40 of the Billboard Hot 100. Credited with coining the term "hyphy" in 1994, Bowens has contributed extensively to the genre and movement.

== Early life ==
Keak da Sneak was born in Brewton, Alabama. As a newborn, he moved to Oakland, California. He found popularity while attending Allendale Elementary School, which he parlayed into later friendships and talent show performances at Oakland's Bret Harte Junior High. Through theater, Keak met his collaborator Agerman.

== Career ==
Keak and Agerman formed Dual Committee when Keak was 15 years old. The duo's performances were first recorded on "Murder Man" and "Stompin in My Steel Toes" on C-BO's 1994 EP, The Autopsy. Citing the personal growth of all three artists, he later signed as a solo artist with Sacramento-based Moe Doe Records. As a result of the signing, he began to receive more radio airplay, especially on San Francisco hip-hop station KMEL.

=== 3X Krazy ===
By the end of their junior year in high school, Keak and his collaborators had recruited rapper B.A. to form the group 3X Krazy. Their first EP, Sick-O, was released independently on August 5, 1995. In 1996 they signed to Virgin Records, releasing the album Stackin' Chips on March 8, 1997 (with help from the single Keep It on the Real; the album received national attention), the second album Immortalized, and then the release of Real Talk 2000 on January 18, 2000. The last 3X Krazy album, a collection of previously unreleased material and remixed songs from Sick-O, was Flowamatic-9, which was released in 2004. The group eventually disbanded.

=== Solo career ===
After years working in the underground scene, Keak began to see mainstream success in 2004 with the song Super Hyphy. His 2006 collaboration with E-40, Tell Me When to Go, received national attention. In total, Keak da Sneak has released almost 20 albums and several mixtapes.

=== Television ===
Keak was featured on MTV's My Super Sweet 16.

== Personal life ==
Williams has been married to Dee Bowens since February 14, 2004. He has four children.

After surviving a shooting in January 2017, Williams carried a gun for protection, which led to an arrest for possession of a firearm by a convicted felon. During his trial two years later, he was shot eight times at a Richmond gas station, rendering him a paraplegic requiring the use of a wheelchair.

After a two-year legal battle, Williams was sentenced to 16 months in state custody. He served five months of his sentence at the California Health Care Facility before being released early due to Proposition 57. Williams returned home to his family after his release.

== Discography ==
=== Solo albums ===
- Sneakacydal (1999)
- Hi-Tek (2001)
- Retaliation (2002)
- The Farm Boyz (2002)
- Counting Other Peoples Money (2003)
- Town Business (2004)
- Keak da Sneak (2004)
- Town Business Raw N’ Uncut (2005)
- That’s My Word (2005)
- Thizz Iz Allndadoe (2006)
- Contact Sport (2006)
- Kunta Kinte (2006)
- The Farm Boyz Starring Keak (2006)
- AllNDaDoe Volume 4, 5, 6... One Of Them Muthafuckaz... (2006)
- On One (2007)
- G-14 Classified (2007)
- All N Da Doe (2008)
- Deified (2008)
- Thizz Iz All N Da Doe (Volume 2) (2009)
- Mobb Boss (2010)
- Keak Hendrix (2011)
- The Tonite Show (Sneakacydal Returns) With Keak Da Sneak (with DJ.Fresh) (2011)
- The Tonite Show (Sneakacydal Returns Instrumentals) With Keak Da Sneak (with DJ.Fresh) (2011)
- Cheddar Cheese I Say (2012)
- The Hoods Gonna Bump It (2014)
- Withdrawl (with The Mekanix) (2017)
- Gorilla (with The Mekanix) (2020)
- Selfmade (The Album) (2022)
- What’s Uppie (2022)
- Mobsta (Deluxe Edition) (2022)
- Still Going Dumb (2022)
- 81 Shots (2023)
- Gorilla (Instrumentals) (with The Mekanix) (2025)

=== Collaboration albums ===
- Dual Committee (with Dual Committee) (2000)
- Da Bidness (with Messy Marv & P.S.D. Tha Drivah) (2007)
- Welcome To Scokland (with San Quinn) (2008)
- Word Pimpin 2: We Don't Need You (with Baby S and Q-Z) (2008)
- Da Bidness Part II (with Messy Marv & P.S.D. Tha Drivah) (2010)
- The Allinner Album (with Benner) (2010)
- Mobbin’ With Mr. Sicaluphacous (with Mac Reese) (2016)
- Drugs, Rap, & Violence (with Kaliban, as Gooch Gang) (2018)
- Lean & Cookies (with Project Pat & Kafani) (2019)
- Life After Death (The Leak) (with Kafani) (2019)
- Starters In The Game & Contact Sport (Scrappers & Thizz Deluxe Edition) (with Mac Dre) (2024)
- O To The O (with Deezy Hollow) (2025)
- 3X Ruthless (with Black C) (2026)

=== Compilation albums ===
- The Appearances (2002)
- Dopegame (The Comp) (2004)
- Da Mixtape (Volume One) (2005)
- Da Mixtape (Volume 2) (2005)
- Town Business B-Sides & Bootlegs: Da Mixtape (Volume 3) Old Shit (2005)
- Da Mixtape (Volume 4) (2005)
- Dopegame 2 (The Comp) (2005)
- Dopegame 3 (The Comp) (2005)
- King Of Tha Supa Dupa Hyphy (2006)
- Block Music (2006)
- The Farm Boyz (Special Edition) (2006)
- Chadada: The Mixtape (Volume 1) (2007)
- Greatest Hits (2007)
- The Best Of: Thizz Iz All N Da Doe (Thizz Nation Volume 22) (2008)
- Let’s Get Thizzical (The Mixtape) (2008)
- Oaklandary (Volume 1) (2024)
- Oaklandary (Volume 2) (2025)
- Oaklandary (Volume 3) (2025)
- Oaklandary (Volume 4) (2025)

=== Soundtrack albums ===
- Copium (2005)

==== As featured artist ====
List of singles as featured artist
Title	Year	Album
"Memphis Cakalac Oakland" (Natalac featuring Project Pat & Keak Da Sneak)	2018	Pimp of the Nation
