= Mac Dre discography =

This is the discography of American rapper, Mac Dre. In the late 1980s, he released three albums with what TIME Magazine called "the raunchiness typical of West Coast rap". In the 1990s, he received a five-year sentence but managed to record two albums over the phone. He later started his own label, Thizz Entertainment, and released four more albums, before he was shot dead in a drive by shooting at a red light, in Kansas City, Missouri, in 2004.

== Albums ==
=== Studio albums ===
- Young Black Brotha (1993)
- Stupid Doo Doo Dumb (1998)
- Rapper Gone Bad (1999)
- Heart of a Gangsta, Mind of a Hustla, Tongue of a Pimp (2000)
- Mac Dre's the Name (2001)
- It's Not What You Say... It's How You Say It (2001)
- Thizzelle Washington (2002)
- Al Boo Boo (2003)
- Ronald Dregan: Dreganomics (2004)
- The Genie of the Lamp (2004)
- The Game Is Thick, Vol. 2 (2004)

=== Posthumous studio albums ===
- Pill Clinton (2007)
- Dre Day: July 5th 1970 (2008)

=== Collaboration albums ===
- Supa Sig Tapes with Little Bruce (1990)
- Turf Buccaneers with Cutthoat Committee (2001)
- Money iz Motive with Cutthoat Committee (2005)
- Da U.S. Open with Mac Mall (2005)
- A Tale of Two Andres with Andre Nickatina (2008)

=== Compilation albums ===
- Don't Hate the Player, Hate the Game (1998)
- The Best of Mac Dre (2002)
- The Best of Mac Dre II (2004)
- The Best of Mac Dre Vol. 3 (2006)
- Everybody Ain't Able with Jay Tee (2007)
- The Best of Mac Dre Vol. 4 (2008)
- The Best of Mac Dre Vol. 5 (2010)

=== Other albums ===
- 2001: Mac Dammit Man & Friends: City Slickers
- 2002: Do You Remember?
- 2005: Judge Dre Mathis
- 2006: 16 Wit Dre (with DJ Backside)
- 2006: 16 Wit Dre, Vol. 2 (with DJ Backside)
- 2006: Tales of II Andres (with Andre Nickatina)
- 2006: Uncut
- 2007: Starters in the Game
- 2007: DreDiggs: Me & My Cuddie (with J-Diggs)
- 2008: The Dre Area
- 2008: What it Thizz
- 2008: For the Streets (14 Unreleased Tracks)
- 2009: Maccin' & Doggin' (with Da'unda'dogg)

=== Compilations, mixtapes & bootlegs ===
- 1996: Mac Dre Presents: The Rompalation Vol.1
- 1998: Don't Hate the Player, Hate the Game (Mac Dre in the Mix)
- 1999: Mac Dre Brings You: The Rompalation II: An Overdose
- 2002: Mac Dre Presents: The Rompalation III
- 2004: The Appearances (Special Guest Appearances)
- 2004: Treal T.V. (The Soundtrack)
- 2005: Welcome to Thizz World (Hosted by DJ Rick Lee)
- 2005: Don't Hate the Player, Hate the Game #2 (Hosted by DJ Rick Lee)
- 2005: 23109: Exhibition of Speed Soundtrack
- 2006: Tales of II Andre's - 100% Authentic Unreleased Tracks (with Andre Nickatina)
- 2006: Treal T.V. (Soundtrack #2)
- 2007: Official Tribute - Collectors Edition (Hosted by DJ Rick Lee)
- 2007: The Best of Mac Dammit & Friends
- 2007: Don't Hate the Player, Hate the Game #3 (Hosted by Chuy Gomez)
- 2008: Don't Hate the Player, Hate the Game #4 (Hosted by DJ Vlad)
- 2008: Tha Furley Ghost Compilation
- 2008: Welcome to Thizz World Volume 2.1 (Hosted by DJ Rick Lee)
- 2008: Welcome to Thizz World Volume 2.2 (Hosted by DJ Rick Lee)
- 2010: G.A.M.E.

=== Unreleased ===
- 1989: Cold Cold Capper (EP)
- 2003: The Supa Sig Tapes (with Little Bruce)

== Extended plays ==
- Young Black Brotha (1989)
- California Livin' (1991)
- What's Really Going On (1992)
- Back n da Hood (1992)

== Videos ==
=== Music videos ===
- 1993: "California Livin'" (featuring Coolio Da Unda Dogg)
- 1999: "Rapper Gone Bad"
- 1999: "Fire"

=== Movies ===
- Treal TV 1 (2002)
- Legend of the Bay: The Mac Dre Documentary (2015)
