= List of people from Vallejo, California =

This is a list of notable people from Vallejo, California.

== Actors ==
- Monique Alexander, porn star
- April Bowlby, actress
- Raymond Burr, actor
- Raphael Cruz, acrobat and actor
- Rockmond Dunbar, actor
- Buddy Joe Hooker, actor
- Bud Jamison, actor
- Wesley Mann, actor
- Keely Shaye Smith, actress

== Artists ==
- Howard Fried, conceptual artist
- Helen Gilbert, painter, kinetic sculptor
- Cleven "Goodie" Goudeau, art director/cartoonist
- Harrison McIntosh, ceramic artist
- Helen Sewell, illustrator

== Athletes ==
- C. J. Anderson, National Football League player
- Brandon Armstrong, National Basketball Association player
- Dick Bass, National Football League player
- Jahvid Best, National Football League player
- Jabari Bird, pro basketball player
- Ping Bodie, Major League Baseball player
- Bobby Brooks, Major League Baseball player
- Bill Buckner, Major League Baseball player
- Willie Calhoun, professional baseball player
- Joey Chestnut, competitive eater
- Roch Cholowsky, college baseball player
- Natalie Coughlin, swimmer with 12 Olympic medals
- Tyler Cravy, Major League Baseball Player
- Ward Cuff, National Football League player
- Thomas DeCoud, National Football League player
- Mike Felder, Major League Baseball player
- Augie Garrido, University of Texas baseball coach
- Jeff Gordon, NASCAR 4-time champion, 5-time Brickyard 400 winner, 3-time Daytona 500 winner
- Damon Hollins, Major League Baseball player
- Fulton Kuykendall, National Football League player
- Tony Longmire, Major League Baseball player
- Tug McGraw, Major League Baseball player
- Mike Merriweather, National Football League player
- Mark Muñoz, Ultimate Fighting Championship fighter
- DeMarcus Nelson, National Basketball Association player
- Rashad Ross, National Football League player
- CC Sabathia, Hall of Fame Major League Baseball player
- Sammie Stroughter, National Football League player
- Joe Taufete'e, player for USA Rugby
- Barton Williams, Olympian, track and field

== Musicians ==
- B-Legit
- Baby Bash
- Celly Cel
- The Click
- Con Funk Shun
- DJ D-Wrek
- Droop-E
- Dubee
- E-40
- Paul Foster
- Funky Aztecs
- H.E.R.
- Mark Izu
- J-Diggs
- Khayree
- LaRussell
- Little Bruce
- Mac Dre
- Mac Mall
- The Mossie
- N2Deep
- Nef the Pharaoh
- One Vo1ce
- Johnny Otis
- Reek Daddy
- Roy Rogers
- Sleep Dank
- SOB X RBE
- Sly Stone
- Suga T
- Norma Tanega
- Turf Talk
- Young Lay

== Other notable figures ==
- Ed Rollins, political advisor
- Zodiac Killer, serial killer
  - Arthur Leigh Allen, primary suspect in Zodiac Killer case

== Writers ==
- Genea Brice, first poet laureate of Vallejo
- Will Cook - western novelist whose work was adapted into films and TV shows
- Ernest J. Gaines
- Gregory Allen Howard
- Charles Jordan
- Mark Joseph
- D.L. Lang, second poet laureate of Vallejo
- Dwayne Parish, first poet laureate of Richmond, California, grew up in Vallejo
- Norman Partridge
- Nina Serrano, poet, filmmaker, KPFA radio host
- Helen Sewell
- Keely Shaye Smith
- Jeremy Snyder, third poet laureate of Vallejo
- James Tracy
