= It's Not What You Say... It's How You Say It =

Studio album by Mac Dre
- Released: November 20, 2001 (U.S.)
- Genres: West Coast hip-hop; hyphy; gangsta rap
- Label: Thizz

Mac Dre chronology
Mac Dre's the Name (2001)	It's Not What You Say... It's How You Say It (2001)	Thizzelle Washington (2002)

It's Not What You Say... It's How You Say It is the sixth studio album by Bay Area rapper Mac Dre released on November 20, 2001.

Bradley Torreano of AllMusic wrote, "Mac Dre's It's Not What You Say...It's How You Say It is another collection of hardcore rap from the underground. Guest stars include Richie Rich, Keak da Sneak, and several others. Fans of his previous work will probably enjoy this just fine, while new listeners can at least get a glimpse into the underground West Coast scene."

== Track listing ==
1. "The Wolf Intro" (featuring Dubee)
2. "Have You Eva" (featuring Dee and Little Bruce)
3. "Bleezies-n-Heem"
4. "Sex, Drugs, Rap?" (featuring Freak-O, Moe Jack and Nutt Briddle)
5. "Livin' It"
6. "So Hard"
7. "Iz Real" (featuring Messy Marv)
8. "Mac Dammit & Friends" (featuring B.A., Keak da Sneak and PSD)
9. "Always Inta Somethin'" (featuring Da' Unda' Dogg, J-Diggs and Sleep Dank)
10. "Chevs and Fords" (featuring Little Bruce)
11. "Take Yo' Panties Off" (featuring Vital) Produced by Lev Berlak
12. "Mac Dre'vious"
13. "Hold Off" (featuring Richie Rich)
14. "Bonus Track" (featuring Shouman and Suga Free)
