= Reek Daddy =

American rapper

- Born: Mariko Nash; 1969; Vallejo, California, U.S.
- Died: August 2016
- Genres: Hip hop, west coast hip hop, hyphy
- Occupation: Rapper
- Years active: 1998–2016
- Label: NOYB Records
- Formerly of: Mac Dre
- Website: nunyagang.wix.com/noyb

Mariko Nash (1969 – August 2016), better known by his stage name Reek Daddy, and also Instigator or Freak da Babbi was an American rapper from Vallejo, California. He was the owner of NOYB Records, a subdivision of the late Mac Dre's Thizz Entertainment label.

== Discography ==
=== Studio albums ===
- Gangsta Of The Year (2000, unreleased)
- Wreak Havoc (2003)
- 25 to Life on the Streets (2003)
- Babbi Land (2006)
- The Reekalation (2006)
- Cutthoat Bizz (2007)
- Sawyer St. Mob (2007) (with Boss Hogg)
- Sacto 2 Da Crest (2009) (with Mr. Skrillz)
- Super Thug (2009)
- Straight Pirate Type (2010)
- Cuddy Bang (2010)
- The Reekalation II (2011)
- Gangsta Of The Year Volume II (2012)
- Dipped in Butter (2013)
- DLK Collabs Vol. 2 (2014)
- Serious as Cancer (2014)
- Pocket Full of Felonies (2015)
- Firey Hot Rocks (2016)

=== Guest appearances ===
Year	Song	Other artist(s)	Album
1998	"Crest Creepers"	Mac Dre, Da'unda'dogg, Dubee, Jamar, Mac Mall, Naked	Stupid Doo Doo Dumb
1999	"Dangerous Prospecx"	Dubee, Naked, Da'unda'dogg	Dangerous Prospects
2001	"Punk Rock"	Mac Dre, Cutthoat Committee, 44 Hoes, Willy Hen	Turf Buccaneers
2001	"Reek Daddy"	Mac Dre, Cutthoat Committee, 44 Hoes, Willy Hen	Turf Buccaneers-
2006	"Rasta Man"	Miami, Vital	Miami's Collection of Dope
2007	"All the Above"	Miami, Lil Cavey, Dubee	Miami and the Nation of Thizzlam, Pt. 2
2008	"On My Block"	Mr. Skrillz, G-Bundle, T-Bone	Customer Service
2008	"911 Emergency"	Mr. Skrillz, Mac Cheeze, Gaf Pak	Wigglenomics
2008	"Code of the Streets"	Mr. Skrillz, Mac Cheeze, The Jacka, Fed-X, Husalah, G-Bundle, Scavenger Click, Bijou, Snake Z, Hard 2 Trust, Gaf Pak	Wigglenomics
2008	"Toe Up"	Smoov-E	Rusty Squeezebox
2009	"Mr. Moneymaker"	Smoov-E	Mr. Biscuits
2009	"V-Town Mayor"	G.O.A.T.	G.O.A.T. Meal
2009	"Moe to the Crest"	Telly Mac, Da'unda'dogg, Miami tha Most	Project Celebrity
2009	"California Bears"	Pat Rich	Pat Rich the Great
2010	"On My Block"	Mr. Skrillz, G-Bundle	Four Full Thangs
2010	"Shemygo" (Remix)	Mr. Skrillz, J-Diggs, Mac Dre, The Jacka, San Quinn, Lee Majors, Mistah F.A.B., Rydah J. Klyde, Cellski, Boss Hogg, Miami	Four Full Thangs
2010	"I'm From the Yay"	Mr. Skrillz, Mac Mall	Four Full Thangs
2010	"Pimpin By Da Pak"	Mr. Skrillz, G-Bundle, Gaf Pak, Cali-O	Four Full Thangs
2010	"B***h"	Dubee	Tha Furly Ghost, Vol. 2
2010	"From a Whole 2 a Half"	T-Nutty, Mr. Skrillz	Perfect Attendance
2010	"Me & My Uzi"	Mr. Skrillz, Mac Dre	Corporate Money
2010	"U Ain't No Gangsta"	Mr. Skrillz, J-Diggs	Corporate Money
2010	"Westcoast Dopeboy"	Mr. Skrillz, San Quinn	Corporate Money
2010	"Got da Hood Wi Me"	Mr. Skrillz, Da'unda'dogg	Corporate Money
2011	"Mathmatic's"	Mendo Dope, Old E, Twinkzilla	Dopeville
2011	"Mendo Dopey"	Mendo Dope, Old E, Charrity	Dopeville
2011	"Rain & Thunder"	Mendo Dope, Old E	Dopeville
2012	"Gangsters Come"	Sleep Dank, Da'unda'dogg	Still King of My City
2012	"707 Backwoodaz"	Mendo Dope, DJ Ignite	Stupid Cali Funky Languistics Extra Mendo Dopish
2012	"Crossroads"	Jay Tee	On One
2012	"Macca Hoe"	Reece Loc	The New Mobb Era
2012	"Game on Lock"	Mendo Dope	Nor Cal Soldiers
2012	"Cutthoat Soup" (Remix)	Mendo Dope	Nor Cal Soldiers
2012	"I Don't Just Rap"	Mendo Dope	420 ft. Below Ground
2012	"420 ft. Below Ground"	Mendo Dope	420 ft. Below Ground
2012	"Cali Dope"	Mendo Dope	420 ft. Below Ground
2014	"Runnen' from the Law"	Mendo Dope	Brain Cells Poppin'
2014	"Go Ahead & Do It"	V-Town, Dirty J	My Medication Is the Cash
2014	"Bay Boyz"	V-Town, Dirty J, Seff Tha Gaffla, Dave Ice	My Medication Is the Cash
