= Rapper Gone Bad =

Studio album by Mac Dre
- Released: August 26, 1999
- Recorded: 1999
- Studios: Dollars And Spence Studios (Vallejo, California); The Grill Studios (Oakland, California); Black Hand Studio (New York, New York)
- Genre: Hip-hop
- Length: 50:02
- Labels: Romp; Swerve
- Producers: Lev Berlak; Phil Armstrong; Todd Fyte; Tone Capone; Warren G; Wilson Hankins

Mac Dre chronology
Stupid Doo Doo Dumb (1998)	Rapper Gone Bad (1999)	Heart of a Gangsta, Mind of a Hustla, Tongue of a Pimp (2000)

Professional ratings
Review scores
Source	Rating
RapReviews	9/10

Rapper Gone Bad is the third studio album by American rapper Mac Dre. It was released on August 26, 1999 via Romp/Swerve Records. The recording sessions took place at Dollars And Spence Studios in Vallejo, The Grill Studios in Oakland and Blackhand Studio in New York. The production was handled by Lev Berlak, Wilson Hankins, Phil Armstrong, Tone Capone, Todd Fyte and Warren G. It features guest appearances from Harm, Big Lurch, B-Legit, Dubee, Dutchess, Killa, Kokane, Lil' Bruce, PSD Tha Drivah, Sky Balla, The WhoRidas and Warren G. The album debuted at number 49 on the Billboard Heatseekers Albums chart in the United States.

== Track listing ==
No.	Title	Producer(s)	Length
1.	"Intro" (featuring Sky Balla)		0:59
2.	"I've Been Down" (featuring Harm)	Tone Capone	4:40
3.	"Rapper Gone Bad"	Lev Berlak; Wilson Hankins	3:25
4.	"Fast Money" (featuring Warren G, Kokane and Dutchess)	Warren G	3:37
5.	"Fish Head Stew"	Lev Berlak; Wilson Hankins	4:03
6.	"How Yo' Hood?" (featuring Killa)	Todd Fyte	5:00
7.	"Fortytwo Fake"	Lev Berlak; Wilson Hankins	3:52
8.	"Fire" (featuring Big Lurch and Harm)	Tone Capone	5:36
9.	"Global" (featuring Dubee)	Phil Armstrong	3:55
10.	"Fuck off the Party" (featuring The WhoRidas)	Lev Berlak; Wilson Hankins	3:56
11.	"Valley Joe" (featuring B-Legit, PSD and Lil' Bruce)	Phil Armstrong	3:01
12.	"Mac Stabber"	Lev Berlak; Wilson Hankins	4:35
13.	"I'm a Thug"	Phil Armstrong	3:23
Total length:			50:02

2006 Thizz Entertainment reissue bonus tracks
No.	Title	Length
12.	"I'm a Thug"
13.	"Hongry" (featuring PSD)
14.	"We Made It" (featuring Trill Real, Dubee, Magnolia Chop, Sleep Dank and J-Diggs)

== Personnel ==
- Andre "Mac Dre" Hicks – vocals
- Skye Nathan "Sky Balla" Branklyn – vocals
- Rodney "Harm" Waller – vocals
- Warren "Warren G" Griffin III – vocals & producer
- Jerry Buddy "Kokane" Long, Jr. – vocals
- Dutchess – vocals
- Killa – vocals
- Steve "PSD Tha Drivah" Davison – vocals
- Antron "Big Lurch" Singleton – vocals
- Major "Dubee a.k.a. Sugawolf Pimp" Norton – vocals
- Hasaan "King Saan" Mahmoud – vocals
- Meikeo Taylor – vocals
- Brandt "B-Legit" Jones – vocals
- "Little Bruce" Thurmon – vocals
- Anthony "Tone Capone" Gilmour – producer
- Lev Berlak – producer
- Will "Flexxx" Hankins – producer
- Todd Fyte – producer
- Phil Armstrong – producer, mixing
- Jason Moss – mixing
- Bernard Gourley – executive producer

== Charts ==
Chart (1999)	Peak position
US Heatseekers Albums (Billboard)	49
