= The Best of Mac Dre =

Greatest hits album by Mac Dre
- Released: 2002
- Recorded: 1988–2002
- Genre: West Coast hip hop, G-funk, gangsta rap, hyphy
- Label: Sumo/Thizz Entertainment
- Producer: 138:29

Mac Dre chronology
The Best of Mac Dre (2002)	The Best of Mac Dre II (2004)

Professional ratings
Review scores
Source	Rating
RapReviews	9/10

The Best of Mac Dre is the first "best of" album by Mac Dre. It was released in 2002 by Sumo/Thizz Entertainment. It is the first compilation of his hit songs, later followed by The Best of Mac Dre, Vol. 2 & 3. Though Mac Dre was killed by gunshot on November 1, 2004, his Bay Area legacy lives on through his music. This album features other Bay Area hip hop legends such as Keak da Sneak, Messy Marv, and San Quinn.

The album contains some of his earliest hits and classics; some dating back to the early 90s. The fact that it is 2 discs shows the amount of music Mac Dre put out during his short life. Though he never hit the mainstream quite as large as some other West Coast artists, his songs have influenced many other Bay Area artists and have inspired cultural phenomenons such as the "Hyphy Movement" and "Thizz Dance". His music always kept true to himself and rightfully earned him as one of the Godfathers of Bay Area Hip Hop.

== Track listing ==
=== Disc 1 ===
1. Too Hard
2. Nuthin But Love
3. All Damn Day
4. Its Nothin (featuring Cutthoat Committee)
5. Hoe We Like (featuring Sleep Dank)
6. Rapper Gone Bad
7. X.O. Remi
8. Love That Donkey
9. Doin What I Do
10. Overdose (featuring Filthy Phil)
11. Fish Head Stew
12. Gangsta Niggaz
13. Life's a Bitch
14. Playin for Kidz (featuring Keak da Sneak)
15. If It Ain't Real (featuring Messy Marv, Da'unda'dogg, Seff tha Gaffla, Naked, San Quinn & Juggy)
16. Gift 2 Gab

=== Disc 2 ===
1. I've Been Down (featuring Harm)
2. California Livin' (featuring Coolio Da Unda Dogg)
3. Young Black Brotha
4. Pimps Get Chose (featuring Don Cisco)
5. Valley Joe (featuring PSD, B-Legit & Little Bruce)
6. Stupid Doo Doo Dumb (featuring Mac Mall & Miami)
7. I Need an Eight (featuring Miami & Rott Wilder)
8. Fire (featuring Big Lurch & Harm)
9. Young Playah
10. Hoes Love It (featuring Spice 1)
11. Fast Money (featuring Warren G, Kokane & Dutches)
12. Anti-Square (featuring PSD, Dubee & Miami)
13. On My Toes
14. Doin What We Do (featuring Da' Unda' Dogg, PSD, Dubee & Mac Mall)
15. They Don't Understand (featuring Ray Luv)
16. Crest Creeper (featuring Dubee, Jamar & Naked)
