= Da Bidness =

Studio album by PSD, Keak da Sneak & Messy Marv
- Released: February 13, 2007
- Recorded: 2006
- Genre: West Coast hip hop
- Labels: Thizz; SMC; Gateway
- Producers: Bitch! Das B-Luv; Clipso; Don Juan; Droop-E; Indo & Fireworks; Jake and the Phatman; Jake One; Lev Berlak; Rick Rock; Tha Rolla; T-Money; Traxamillion; Tron Treez for Suga Shack/Kream Team Music

PSD chronology
PSD Classic (2005)	Da Bidness (2007)

Keak da Sneak chronology
On One (2007)	Da Bidness (2007)	Deified (2008)

Messy Marv chronology
Muzik Fo' tha Taliban (2007)	Da Bidness (2007)	Fillmoe Nation, Vol. 1 (2007)

Professional ratings
Review scores
Source	Rating
Allmusic	link
Okayplayer	(77/100) 2007
RapReviews.com	(7/10) link

Da Bidness is an album released by the Bay Area rappers, PSD, Keak da Sneak and Messy Marv.

It was released on February 13, 2007, for Thizz Entertainment, SMC Recordings and Gateway Records and was produced by the prominent Bay Area producers Traxamillion, Droop-E, Rick Rock, Jake and the Phatman as well as PSD himself, Clipso, Indo & Fireworks, Lev Berlak, Tha Rolla and Don Juan.

The collaboration proved successful and charted on three Billboard charts, peaking at #82 on the Top R&B/Hip-Hop Albums, #40 on the Independent Albums chart and #12 on the Top Heatseekers. Two singles were released from the album, "Cus, Cus" and "That Go", though neither made it to the charts. Various other Bay Area rappers contributed to the album including E-40 and San Quinn.

== Track listing ==
#	Track	Featured guest(s)	Producer(s)	Length
1	"Reloaded"		Tron Treez for Suga Shack/Kream Team Music	3:46
2	"Thick O' Thangz"	Mistah F.A.B.; Turf Talk; Dubee; San Quinn	Clipso	4:53
3	"Yee!!!!!!"		Indo & Fireworks	3:42
4	"If She Know Me, Show Owe Me'"		Jake and the Phatman	4:11
5	"Cus, Cus"		Droop-E	3:49
6	"Gumbo Pot"	E-40	Droop-E	3:54
7	"Fakin' It Ain't Cool"		Droop-E	3:57
8	"Burdens of His Youth"		Droop-E	3:45
9	"That Go (Keak Da Sneak Solo)"		Mozark	3:51
10	"Hey Girl"	San Quinn	Tha Rolla	3:02
11	"Cool Nigga Hour Skit"	Da Ovadose; Nef		1:20
12	"2 Cool"	2 Cool	Jake One	0:45
13	"Cool Nigga"	Rick Rock	Rick Rock	3:55
14	"Deerfoot"	Mistah F.A.B.	Droop-E	4:24
15	"Joseph Stalin"	J. Stalin	Lev Berlak	3:17
16	"Bottom Bitch"	Rydah J. Klyde	Traxamillion	3:52
17	"Hoes....."	Mac Dre	Don Juan	3:44
18	"Eff Da World, We Love Furl (2 Step Remix)/*Cus, Cus"	Dubee	PSD; Bitch! Das B-Luv; Droop-E	7:43

== Personnel ==
- Lev Berlak – producer, mixing
- The Will Bronson Chorus – A&R
- Don Juan – producer
- Indo – producer
- Monte "Montrock" Malone – production co-ordination
- Jason Moss – mixing
- Rick Rock – producer
