= Dre Day: July 5th 1970 =

Studio album by Mac Dre
- Released: July 22, 2008
- Genre: Hip hop; hyphy
- Label: Thizz; Sumo Records
- Producer: Andre Hicks; Curtis Nelson

Mac Dre chronology
Pill Clinton (2007)	Dre Day: July 5th 1970 (2008)	What It Thizz? (2008)

Dre Day: July 5th 1970 is a posthumous 2008 album by hyphy Bay Area rapper Mac Dre, released by Thizz Entertainment. It features remixes of Dre classics with new verses created by other artists, as well as several of his more obscure tracks. The date in the title commemorates his birthday. The illustration on the album cover depicts Mac Dre as Uncle Sam.

== Track listing ==
1. Since "84", "94", "04" (featuring Dubee and Mistah F.A.B.)
2. Doogie wit It
3. All da Time (featuring Chop da Hookman, Bavgate and Johnny Ca$h)
4. G.A.M.E (featuring B-Legit)
5. West Coast Pimp (featuring J-Diggs)
6. Hoes (featuring PSD and Keak da Sneak)
7. Giggin' (featuring Mistah F.A.B. and Dem Hoodstarz)
8. Feelin' Myself (featuring Keak da Sneak and Johnny Ca$h)
9. Hands Made 4 Holdin Grands (featuring Dubee)
10. Roll Wit (featuring Zion I)
11. On da Run (featuring J-Diggs, Mac Mall, Duna and Boss Hogg)
12. 6-500 (featuring Rydah J. Klyde)
13. Quarter Backin' (featuring Dubee and J-Hype)
14. Get Stupid (featuring Cutthoat Committee)
15. Treal Man (featuring Mac Minister and Swamp Kat)
16. My Life's a Movie (featuring Messy Marv)
17. Crestside (featuring Dubee, J-Diggs and Da' Unda' Dogg)
18. Thizzle Dance (featuring Miami and Keak da Sneak)

== Reception ==
A review in Rap Reviews recommended Dre Day to "casual Dre fans", arguing that "this may be one of the better uses of his catalog since his death".
