= Revenue Retrievin': Graveyard Shift =

Studio album by E-40
- Released: March 29, 2011
- Recorded: 2010–2011
- Genre: Hip hop
- Length: 77:05
- Labels: Heavy on the Grind; EMI
- Producers: Droop-E; T-Pain; pOETiqbEETz; Traxx FDR; Jelly Roll; ToneBoneBeats; DecadeZ; Shape Shifta; Bugsy; Bosko; DJ Toure

E-40 chronology
| Revenue Retrievin': Overtime Shift (2011) | Revenue Retrievin': Graveyard Shift (2011) | The Block Brochure: Welcome to the Soil 1 (2012) |

Revenue Retrievin': Graveyard Shift is the fourteenth studio album by American rapper E-40. It was released on March 29, 2011, by Heavy on the Grind Entertainment and EMI. His thirteenth album, Revenue Retrievin': Overtime Shift, was released on the same day. He also released his eleventh and twelfth albums on the same day in 2010.

The album has 20 tracks, and the featured guests include T-Pain, Tech N9ne, Bosko, Bun B, Slim Thug and Turf Talk, among others.

== Singles ==
"She Smashed the Homie" was released as promotional single for the album. The song features Snoop Dogg and Ray J.

A music video for "Concrete" was released on April 6, 2011 and one for "That Candy Paint" featuring Bun B and Slim Thug was released on May 15.

== Reception ==
Professional ratings
Review scores
| Source | Rating |
|---|---|
| AllMusic | 4/5 stars |
| HipHopDX | 3.5/5 stars |
| Pitchfork Media | 8.3/10 |
| RapReviews | 8.0/10 |
| Spin | 7/10 |

=== Commercial performance ===
Revenue Retrievin': Graveyard Shift debuted at number 40 on the US Billboard 200, with approximately 44,000 units sold in the first week.

== Track listing ==
| No. | Title | Writer(s) | Producer(s) | Length |
|---|---|---|---|---|
| 1. | "Barbarian" | Earl Stevens | Droop-E | 3:32 |
| 2. | "Serious" (featuring T-Pain) | E. Stevens; Faheem Najm | T-Pain | 3:33 |
| 3. | "Graveyard Shift" (featuring Cousin Fik & Choose Up Cheese) | E. Stevens; Rafiki Sims; Arcale Turner; W. Carter | DecadeZ | 3:34 |
| 4. | "My Lil' Grimey Nigga" (featuring Stressmatic) | E. Stevens; Thomas Jackson | Droop-E | 3:03 |
| 5. | "Yankin'" (featuring Hot & Laroo T.H.H.) | E. Stevens | pOETiqbEETz | 3:24 |
| 6. | "Concrete" | E. Stevens | Droop-E | 3:19 |
| 7. | "Club On Lock" (featuring Matt Blaque & Laroo T.H.H.) | E. Stevens | Traxx FDR | 3:23 |
| 8. | "Fried" (featuring Tech N9ne & Marty James) | E. Stevens; Aaron Yates; David Drew; James | Jelly Roll | 4:45 |
| 9. | "Back & Forth" (featuring Turf Talk, Cousin Fik & Stressmatic) | E. Stevens; Demar Bernstine | Droop-E | 4:38 |
| 10. | "Bad Bitch" (featuring Stressmatic & Droop-E) | E. Stevens; Earl Stevens Jr. | Droop-E | 4:10 |
| 11. | "Takin' Em Back" | E. Stevens | Droop-E | 3:24 |
| 12. | "My Shit Bang" | E. Stevens | ToneBonebeats | 4:03 |
| 13. | "The Streets Don't Love Nobody" (featuring Turf Talk & DB Tha General) | E. Stevens | DecadeZ | 4:08 |
| 14. | "43" (featuring B-Legit) | E. Stevens; B. Jones; E. Stevens Jr.; S. Bostic | Droop-E | 3:32 |
| 15. | "That Candy Paint" (featuring Bun B & Slim Thug) | E. Stevens; Bernard Freeman; Stayve J. Thomas; David Anyanwu | Shape Shifta | 5:04 |
| 16. | "E Forty" | E. Stevens | Bugsy | 3:50 |
| 17. | "Trapped" (featuring Mike Marshal) | E. Stevens | Traxx FDR | 3:43 |
| 18. | "Spooky" (featuring Bosko) | E. Stevens; Bosko Kante | Bosko | 4:18 |
| 19. | "Don't Try This at Home" (featuring Philthy Rich & Stevie Joe) | E. Stevens; Philip Beasley; Steve Moffett Jr. | DJ Toure | 3:59 |
| 20. | "Tuff Times" (featuring Bosko & Netta B) | E. Stevens; Aquanetta Brooks | Bosko | 4:07 |

iTunes Bonus Track
| No. | Title | Writer(s) | Producer(s) | Length |
|---|---|---|---|---|
| 21. | "I'm That" (featuring R.O.D.) | E. Stevens; Roderick Cudjo | The Mekanix | 4:09 |
| 22. | "Fast Quarter" (featuring Yukmouth & C-Bo) | Stevens; Jerold Ellis III; Shawn Thomas | | 4:41 |

=== Notes ===
- Cousin Fik and Laroo T.H.H. are not credited on "Barbarian"
- Laroo T.H.H. is not credited on "Spooky"
- Decadez is not credited on "The Streets Don't Love Nobody"

Sample credits

- "43" – Contains a sample of "Who Do You Believe In" by Scarface
- "That Candy Paint" – Contains a sample of "You're Everything" by Bun B featuring Rick Ross, David Banner & 8Ball & MJG

== Charts ==
| Chart (2011) | Peak position |
|---|---|
| US Billboard 200 | 40 |
| US Top R&B/Hip-Hop Albums (Billboard) | 12 |
| US Top Rap Albums (Billboard) | 6 |
| US Independent Albums (Billboard) | 8 |
