= Federal Correctional Institution, Lompoc II =

Medium security prison in California, US

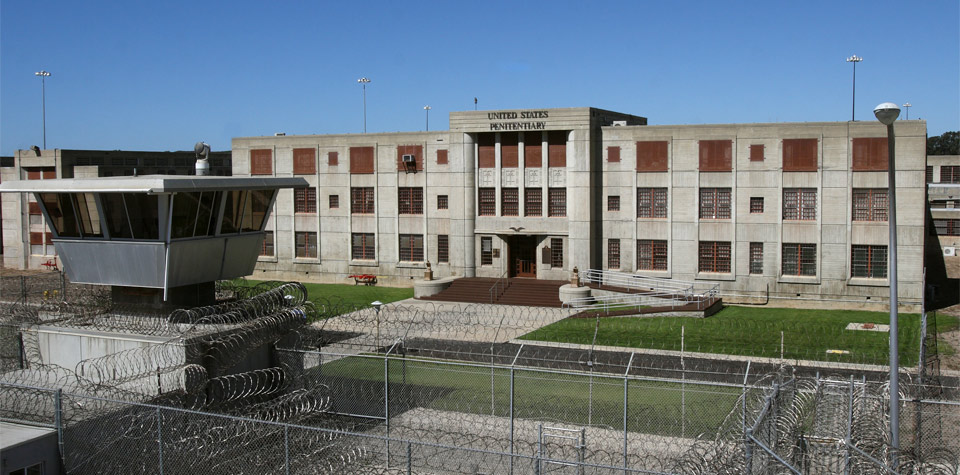
- Interactive map of Federal Correctional Institution, Lompoc II
- Location: Lompoc, Santa Barbara County, California; 34.6762°N 120.5057°W
- Status: Operational
- Security class: Low-security (with minimum-security prison camp)
- Population: 2,045 [1,754 at the FCI, 291 in prison camps] (September 2024)
- Opened: 1959
- Managed by: Federal Bureau of Prisons

The Federal Correctional Institution, Lompoc II is a low (formerly also a high, and then medium) security United States federal prison for male inmates in Lompoc, California. It is part of the Lompoc Federal Correctional Complex (FCC Lompoc) and is operated by the Federal Bureau of Prisons, a division of the United States Department of Justice. The facility also has a satellite prison camp for minimum-security male inmates. It was formerly a military disciplinary barracks on Camp Cooke.

FCC Lompoc is located within the city of Lompoc, 175 miles (282 km) northwest of Los Angeles, adjacent to Vandenberg Space Force Base. The complex also includes a second Federal Correctional Institution (in addition to the satellite prison camp).

== Facility ==
The FCI (Low) has a Residential Drug Abuse Program (RDAP)

There are two minimum security prison camps that also house adult male inmates.

== Notable inmates ==
=== Current ===
Inmate Name	Register Number	Status	Details
Sunny Balwani	24966-111	Serving a 12-year, 11-month sentence. Scheduled for release in 2034.	Found guilty of fraud and conspiracy related to his activities at Theranos.
Kevin Harpham	13663-085	Serving a 32-year sentence. Scheduled for release in 2038.	Pleaded guilty to bombings in Spokane in 2011.
Enrique Marquez Jr.	71450-112	Serving a 20-year sentence. Scheduled for release on December 31, 2032.	Pleaded guilty to providing weapons to the perpetrators of the 2015 San Bernardino attack
Robert H. Shapiro	77952-112	Serving a 25-year sentence. Scheduled for release on July 31, 2039.	Pleaded guilty to orchestrating and leading a massive investment fraud scheme, in which more than 7,000 victims suffered financial losses, as well as tax evasion. Shapiro was the former owner, president, and CEO of Woodbridge Group of Companies LLC (Woodbridge Securities).
Cody Easterday	37593-509	Serving an 11-year sentence; scheduled for release in 2032.	Washington rancher convicted in 2022 of wire fraud after invoicing multiple companies for payment for cattle that did not exist.
Claus Svelmøe Marcuslund.	68034-510	Serving a 14-year sentence. Scheduled for release on June 14, 2035.	Pleaded guilty to distributing child pornography. Traveled from Copenhagen, Denmark, to Fresno, California, to meet with an HSI undercover agent who posed as the mother of a 7-year-old child whom Marcuslund was to abuse.

=== Former ===
Inmate Name	Register Number	Photo	Status	Details
Ivan Boesky	13987-054		Released from custody in 1990; served 2 years.	Former leading Wall Street speculator; pleaded guilty in 1987 to conspiracy to file false stock trading records for making $80 million through an insider trading scheme.
Auburn Calloway	14601-076		Serving consecutive life sentences with no possibility of parole. Now at USP Florence High	Hijacker of Federal Express Flight 705 in 1994.
Nate Colbert	07633-198		Released from custody in 1992, served six month sentence	Former Major League Baseball player; pleaded guilty to committing fraud on bank loan documents.
Demetrius Flenory	13037-078		Now at FCI Sheridan	Co-founder of the Black Mafia Family criminal organization; pleaded guilty in 2007 to leading a national drug trafficking operation based in Detroit, Michigan with his brother, Terry Flenory, who was also sentenced to 30 years.
Carmine Persico	74666-158		Died at Duke University Hospital while serving a combined sentence of 139 years; was eligible for release in 2050.	Mafia figure; former Colombo crime family Boss; convicted in 1986 of murder, loansharking, bribery and extortion, all in aid of racketeering, in order to control and profit from the concrete industry in New York City.
Mossimo Giannulli	77808-112		Released from custody in 2021, served five month sentence	Charged with connection to the 2019 college admissions bribery scandal.
Gene Haas	43241-112		Released from custody in 2009; served 16 months.	Haas pleaded guilty to a felony conspiracy charge in 2007 for orchestrating a plan to list bogus expenses that could be written off as business costs and save Haas Automation millions in taxes.
Harry Robbins Haldeman	Unlisted (Note: Inmates released from custody before 1982 are not listed on the Federal Bureau of Prisons website.)		Released from custody in 1978; served 18 months.	White House Chief of Staff for President Richard Nixon and key figure in the Watergate scandal; convicted in 1975 of conspiracy and obstruction of justice.
Andre Louis Hicks	55553-097		Released from custody in 1996; served 4 years.	American rap artist known as Mac Dre and member of the Romper Room Gang, which was suspected of committing a series of bank robberies. He refused a plea deal and was convicted in 1992 of conspiracy for plotting to rob a bank in Fresno, California. Mac Dre served his time between USP Lompoc and Fresno. He recorded Back n da Hood at this time.
Trevor Jacob	66235-510		Released from custody on June 12, 2024; served a 6-month sentence.	Pleaded guilty to obstruction of justice by deliberating destroying a plane wreckage that was intentionally crashed for his YouTube channel.
Herbert W. Kalmbach	Unlisted		Released from custody in 1975; served 6 months.	Personal attorney for President Richard Nixon; pleaded guilty in 1974 to illegally soliciting nearly $4 million in campaign funds.
Chuck Muncie	03389-198		Released from custody in 1992; served 18 months.	Former National Football League player; pleaded guilty in 1988 to selling cocaine to an undercover federal agent and perjury.
Eugene Plotkin	58897-054		Released from custody in 2011; served 3 years.	Former associate at Goldman Sachs; convicted in 2007 masterminding an insider trading conspiracy which netted $6.5 million; Plotkin's story was featured on the CNBC television program American Greed.
Jorge Salcedo	77807-112		Released from custody on December 30, 2021.	Charged with connection to the 2019 college admissions bribery scandal.
Stephen Semprevivo	77828-112		Released from custody in 2020, served four month sentence	Charged with connection to the 2019 college admissions bribery scandal.
Reed Slatkin	24057-112		Released from custody in 2013; served 14 years.	Co-founder of EarthLink; pleaded guilty in 2002 to mail fraud, wire fraud, money laundering and conspiracy to obstruct justice for stealing $593 million from investors in one of the biggest Ponzi schemes in US history; Slatkin's story was featured on the CNBC television program American Greed.
Devin Sloane	77815-112		Released from custody in 2020, served four month sentence	Charged with connection to the 2019 college admissions bribery scandal.
Roger Ver	99722-111		Released from custody in 2003	Entrepreneur, early investor and promoter of Bitcoin. Charged with selling explosives without a license, illegally storing explosives, and mailing injurious articles.
Hüseyin Yıldırım	09542-018		Released from custody and deported to his home country of Turkey in 2003; served 5 years.	Turkish national; convicted in 1989 of conspiring with spy James Hall III to sell classified information regarding US eavesdropping operations to East German and Soviet agents between 1983 and 1988.
Danny Zappin	08036-032		Released from custody in 2005; served 2 years	Founder of Maker Studios served a sentence for drug possession.

== COVID-19 pandemic ==
A deadly COVID-19 outbreak swept through the federal correctional complex in 2020. It included several dozen staff members, including correctional officers.

== See also ==
- List of U.S. federal prisons
- Federal Bureau of Prisons
- Incarceration in the United States
