= Young Black Brotha =

Young Black Brotha may refer to:

- Young Black Brotha (EP), a 1989 EP by Mac Dre
- Young Black Brotha (album), a 1993 album by Mac Dre
- Young Black Brotha Records, founded by Khayree
