= Revenue Retrievin': Overtime Shift =

Studio album by E-40
- Released: March 29, 2011
- Recorded: 2010–2011
- Genre: Hip hop
- Length: 70:16
- Label: Heavy on the Grind; EMI
- Producer: Droop-E; E-40; Laylaw; Rawsmoov; ToneBonebeats; Willy Will; Chad Hugo; Traxx FDR; Nonstop Da Hitman; Matt Price; DecadeZ; DJ Toure; Sean T; Jake One; Aaron Harris

E-40 chronology
Revenue Retrievin': Night Shift (2010)	Revenue Retrievin': Overtime Shift (2011)	Revenue Retrievin': Graveyard Shift (2011)

Revenue Retrievin': Overtime Shift is the thirteenth studio album by American rapper E-40. It was released on March 29, 2011, by Heavy on the Grind Entertainment and EMI. His fourteenth album, Revenue Retrievin': Graveyard Shift, was released on the same day. He also released his eleventh and twelfth albums on the same day in 2010.

The album has 20 tracks, and the featured guest include B-Legit, Devin the Dude, Droop-E and Laroo T.H.H., among others.

== Singles ==
"She Smashed the Homie" was released as promotional single for the album. The song features Snoop Dogg and Ray J with production by Chris "C.P DUBB" Washington, and was written by E-40 and Snoop Dogg.

A music video for "I Love my Momma" featuring R.O.D. and Mic Conn was released on April 15, 2011. Another one for "My Money Straight" featuring Guce, Black C, and Young Jun3 was released on March 16, along with one for "Rear View Mirror" featuring B-Legit and Stressmatic on August 13.

== Reception ==
Professional ratings
Review scores
Source	Rating
AllMusic	3.5/5 stars
HipHopDX	3/5 stars
Pitchfork Media	8.0/10
RapReviews	7.5/10
Spin	8/10

=== Commercial performance ===
Revenue Retrievin': Overtime Shift debuted at number 42 on the Billboard 200, with approximately 43,000 units sold in the first week.

== Track listing ==
No.	Title	Producer(s)	Length
1.	"Mr. Flamboyant 2K11"	Droop-E; E-40	4:30
2.	"Drugs" (featuring B-Legit)	Aaron Harris; Laylaw	3:09
3.	"Hillside"	Rawsmoov	4:02
4.	"Gunz"	ToneBonebeats	3:38
5.	"Slow It Down" (featuring J. Stalin, Decadez & Lil Jon)	Nonstop Da Hitman	3:39
6.	"Me & My Bitch"	Willy Will	4:35
7.	"Beastin'"	Chad Hugo	3:55
8.	"My Money Straight" (featuring Guce, Black C & Young Jun3)	Traxx FDR	4:04
9.	"I Love my Momma" (featuring R.O.D. & Mic Conn)	Matt Price	4:09
10.	"I Am Your" (featuring Droop-E & Laroo T.H.H.)	DecadeZ	3:11
11.	"In the Morning" (featuring Beeda Weeda & Work Dirty)	DecadeZ	3:58
12.	"Punkin' Em Out"	DJ Toure	3:55
13.	"Born In The Struggle" (featuring Dr. Cornel West & Mike Marshall)	Sean T	4:38
14.	"Fuck 'Em"	DecadeZ	3:24
15.	"Rear View Mirror" (featuring B-Legit & Stressmatic)	DecadeZ	3:13
16.	"Lookin' Back" (featuring Devin the Dude)	Jake One	4:25
17.	"Stay Gone" (featuring Decadez)	Droop-E	4:07
18.	"Movin' Organized Business (M.O.B.)"	Willy Will	3:12
19.	"Tired of Sellin Yola"	Droop-E	3:49
20.	"Click About It" (featuring The Click, Harm & Bosko)	DecadeZ	3:21

iTunes Bonus Track
No.	Title	Length
21.	"Pussy Ass"	4:15
22.	"He's No Longer" (featuring Bebop & Cheapskate)	4:11

== Charts ==
Chart (2011)	Peak position
US Billboard 200	42
US Top R&B/Hip-Hop Albums (Billboard)	13
US Top Rap Albums (Billboard)	7
US Independent Albums (Billboard)	4
