= The Genie of the Lamp =

Studio album by Mac Dre
- Released: July 20, 2004
- Genres: Hip hop; hyphy
- Label: Thizz
- Producers: Mac Dre; Tone Capone; One Drop Scott; Shouman; Rob-Lo; Harm; Traxx; Gennessee; Syko; Jonan Whale; T.D. Camp

Mac Dre chronology
Ronald Dregan: Dreganomics (2004)	The Genie of the Lamp (2004)	The Game Is Thick, Vol. 2 (2004)

Professional ratings
Review scores
Source	Rating
RapReviews	7.5/10

The Genie of the Lamp is the tenth studio album by Bay Area rapper Mac Dre released on July 20, 2004. The album features the work of several producers, including Tone Capone on "2 Times & Pass"; Shouman on "My Alphabets"; and One Drop Scott on "Not My Job" and "Err Thang".

== Track listing ==
1. "Genie of the Lamp"
2. "She Neva Seen"
3. "Early Retirement"
4. "Out There"
5. "My Alphabets" (featuring Suga Free and Rappin' 4-Tay)
6. "Err Thang" (featuring Sumthin' Terrible)
7. "Non Discriminant" (featuring PSD)
8. "Hear Me Now ?"
9. "I Feed My Bitch" (featuring Keak Da Sneak and B.A.)
10. "Not My Job"
11. "Hotel, Motel"
12. "2 Times & Pass"
13. "Make You Mine"
14. "Crest Shit" (featuring Dubee, Da'Unda'Dogg and J-Diggs)
15. "Bonus Track"

== Reception ==
In a review on RapReviews.com, Steve "Flash" Juon commended several producers featured on the album, but also lauded Dre, saying, "Dre proves he is an able producer behind the boards himself, with the heavily twonked out sound of “Early Retirement” (in which Dre declares himself 'doper than a Bobby Brown piss test') and the old school throwback drum’n’bass style of 'Hear Me Now.'"
