= PSD Classic =

Studio album by PSD
- Released: August 23, 2005
- Recorded: 2004–2005
- Genre: Hip hop
- Label: Thizz Entertainment
- Producer: PSD, Mac Dre, Jason Moss, Mike Mosley, Lev Berlak, Phillip Armstrong

PSD chronology
The Guru (2005)	PSD Classic (2005)	Da Bidness (2007)

PSD Classic is the seventh album by the rapper, PSD. It was released on August 23, 2005, for Thizz Entertainment and was produced by PSD, Mac Dre, Jason Moss, Mike Mosley, Lev Berlak and Phillip Armstrong.

== Track listing ==
1. "Ménage a Trios" - 5:01
2. "The Fast Way" - 3:15 (featuring San Quinn, Mac Dre)
3. "Mississippi" - 4:00
4. "Shiesty" - 3:43
5. "Scrillagitta" - 3:26
6. "I Want That Thang" - 4:20
7. "Puff It" - 3:39
8. "Nasty Boy" - 4:27
9. "It's Over" - 4:59
10. "My Business" - 3:26
11. "Dot Mae" - 4:27
12. "Golden State" - 4:54 (featuring E-40)
13. "Pink Part" - 4:13 (featuring Mac Mall)
14. "All I Want" - 4:45
15. "What It Is" - 3:45
