= 16 wit Dre, Vol. 2 =

Remix album by Mac Dre
- Released: December 19, 2006 (U.S.)
- Genre: Rap, hyphy, hip hop
- Label: Thizz

Mac Dre chronology
16 wit Dre (2006)	16 wit Dre, Vol. 2 (2006)	Starters in the Game (2007)

16 wit Dre, Vol. 2 is a 2006 remix album by deceased hyphy Bay Area rapper Mac Dre mixed by DJ Backside.

== Track listing ==
1. "Dretro"
2. "Chedda Getta"
3. "Hongry"
4. "Gas You Up"
5. "California Bear"
6. "Legend"
7. "Many Styles"
8. "3rd Wall"
9. "Wild Night" (featuring Mob Figaz)
10. "Coonin"
11. "Thizzness"
12. "Hood Representatives"
13. "Murda"
14. "On"
15. "DJ Backside"
16. "Mr. Furly"
