= Game Costs =

Studio album by PSD
- Released: September 16, 1997
- Recorded: 1992–1993
- Genre: West Coast hip hop, gangsta rap
- Label: Swerve Records
- Producer: Baby Beesh, PSD, Jay Tee, Funk Daddy, Dave G., Johnny Z

PSD chronology
Game Costs (1997)	Bread Head (1999)

Professional ratings
Review scores
Source	Rating
Allmusic	3/5 stars

Game Costs is the first album by the rapper PSD. It was released on September 16, 1997, for Swerve Records and was produced by Baby Beesh, PSD, Jay Tee, Funk Daddy, Dave G. and Johnny Z. Game Costs found little success outside of the Bay Area and did not make it to the Billboard charts.

The album includes the popular track "Every Damn Day" (a.k.a. "Every Damn Day I Smoke Dank") which, over the years, has been wrongly attributed to another Bay Area rapper, Mac Dre. In fact, Mac Dre had no part in the track's production. Performing with PSD on "Every Damn Day" is the Bay Area rapper, Mac Lee.

== Track listing ==
1. "So Cold"- 3:06
2. "Premeditated" (remix)- 3:45
3. "Hustler"- 3:54
4. "Tang & O.J."- 3:43
5. "Ménage a Trois"- 5:08
6. "Every Damn Day"- 5:19 (featuring Mac Lee)
7. "The Ghetto"- 4:24 (featuring Mac Lee)
8. "Pepi Lepew Pimpin'"- 4:10 (featuring Mac Lee)
9. "Bread Head"- 3:41 (featuring Mac Lee)
10. "My Daily Bread"- 5:11
11. "Much Luv"- 5:19
12. "Ghetto"- 4:07
13. "The Prize"- 4:09
14. "Premeditated"- 3:15

== Credits ==
Johnny Z - producer
Funk Daddy - producer
Dave G. - producer
Jay Tee - producer
PSD - vocals, producer, main performer
Bernard Gourley - executive producer
Mac Lee - performer
Baby Beesh - producer
Yolanda - vocals
Young Wonder - vocals
Dion - vocals
