= RV Song of the Whale =

Research vessel owned by Marine Conservation Research International

History

United Kingdom
- Name: Song of the Whale
- Owner: Marine Conservation Research International
- Operator: Marine Conservation Research Ltd
- Port of registry: London
- Builder: Blondecell Ltd, Cracknore Hard, Marchwood, Southampton, UK.
- Launched: 6 June 2004
- Christened: 6 June 2004
- Home port: Ipswich, United Kingdom
- Identification: MMSI number: 235007200
- Status: in service

General characteristics
- Type: Research vessel
- Tonnage: 52 GT
- Length: 21.53 m
- Beam: 5.6 m
- Height: 33 m (air draught)
- Draught: 3 m
- Propulsion: Yanmar 6LYA-STP 370 hp Single shaft; fixed pitch propeller; single bow thruster
- Sail plan: cutter
- Speed: 6.5 knots (12.0 km/h; 7.5 mph)
- Range: 1500 nm
- Endurance: 30+ days=
- Complement: 12 (Crew and Scientific Personnel)

RV Song of the Whale is a research vessel owned by Marine Conservation Research International and operated by Marine Conservation Research Ltd. The 70-foot vessel was designed specifically to carry out research on cetaceans (and other marine fauna) using benign research techniques such as passive acoustic monitoring.

== Description ==
Song of the Whale is a cutter-rigged steel-hulled research vessel commissioned by the International Fund for Animal Welfare (IFAW) and built in 2004. The vessel was designed by Rogers Yacht Design of Lymington and built to Lloyd's Special Service Craft Rules for world-wide service – the first sailing vessel to meet those standards for 30 years. Ordered from Blondecell Ltd, the subcontracted steel hull was fabricated by Corus Steel and assembled by Riverside Fabrication at Falmouth, Cornwall. The addition of the composite superstructure and the full outfitting was carried out at Blondecell's facility at Cracknore Hard, Marchwood, Hampshire. The vessel cost £1.5 million.

The design minimises acoustic emissions to facilitate the benign research techniques favoured by her former owners IFAW and the engine-room is encased in a Faraday cage to contain electrical fields. The outfit of Song of the Whale includes the latest computerised recording and tracking devices to ensure that best and most advanced acoustic research can be carried out. To assist physical observation, there is a two-person crow's nest.

The new vessel was launched in St Katharine Docks, London, on 6 June 2004 by Pierce and Keely Brosnan.

== Operation ==
Song of the Whale was formerly owned by IFAW until 14 March 2014 when the vessel was granted to Marine Conservation Research International of Kelvedon, UK. She is based at Ipswich and continues to carry out the research for which she designed, using benign techniques. She replaced a smaller vessel of the same name, a converted 46-foot luxury yacht, which had been in service for 17 years.

Song of the Whale carries out most of its research under sail to reduce the impact on the whales and other marine mammals being researched. The focus of projects is on their presence, distribution, movements and behaviour. Noise suppression is particularly important when assessing populations of whales as the researchers can listen to their sounds up to 20 miles away using hydrophone arrays, not relying solely on surface sightings. Research undertaken is focused on the conservation of threatened species and habitats and includes work on the problems of underwater noise, whales becoming entangled in fishing gear or in collisions with ships.
