= Willie Roy Jenkins =

American murderer and suspected serial killer on death row

- Jenkins's Mugshot
- Born: July 30, 1953 (age 73); Houston, Texas, U.S.
- Convictions: Texas: Capital Murder; Rape; California: Rape x4
- Penalty: Texas: Death; California: Involuntary commitment

Details
- Victims: 1–4
- Span of crimes: 1975–1977
- Country: United States
- States: Texas (possibly North Carolina)
- Date apprehended: 1970s
- Imprisoned at: Allan B. Polunsky Unit, West Livingston, Texas

Willie Roy Jenkins (born July 30, 1953) is an American murderer, rapist and suspected serial killer who was linked via DNA to a 1975 rape-murder committed in San Marcos, Texas, while he was imprisoned for four rapes committed in California during the 1970s. Convicted and sentenced to death for this crime, he has since been proposed as a suspect in three additional murders, but so far has not been charged with any of them.

== Murder of Sheryl Norris ==
On November 24, 1975, the naked body of 20-year-old Sheryl Ann Norris, a native of Fort Walton Beach, Florida who worked as a secretary for the Crime Preventention Institute of Texas (now the Texas State University), was found in the bathroom of her apartment in San Marcos. An autopsy determined that she had been beaten, raped and ultimately strangled and drowned. Norris had last been seen the previous day when she had gone out to get some lunch, but later failed to return to her job. Despite the best efforts of investigators, no suspect was arrested at the time and case went cold.

=== Arrest, trial, and imprisonment ===
For more than 35 years, Norris' murder remained unsolved, but semen and DNA samples were eventually recovered from the perpetrator and entered into CODIS. In November 2010, a match was made to 57-year-old Willie Roy Jenkins, a sex offender who had been detained at the Coalinga State Hospital in Coalinga, California for four rapes committed in that state during the 1970s. Soon after the match, he was charged with Norris' murder and moved to the Fresno County Jail, where he awaited extradition to Texas on $1 million bond.

Following his extradition to the Hays County Jail, he was charged with first-degree murder, with the District Attorney's Office announcing that they would seek the death penalty against him. This marked the first time capital punishment had been sought in Hays County since the reinstatement of capital punishment following Gregg v. Georgia.

During the trial, prosecutors established that Jenkins, who was serving with the United States Marine Corps and was stationed in California at the time, was a violent criminal who assaulted hospital staff at Coalinga State Hospital. To counter this, his attorneys questioned the validity of the DNA evidence, their client's age and drew attention to Jenkins' personal life, during which he suffered abuse at the hands of family members and his wife. This did not manage to convince the jury, who found Jenkins guilty on all counts after deliberating for two hours. He was subsequently sentenced to death later that same month.

Soon after, an automatic appeal was submitted to the Texas Criminal Court, in which attorneys claimed that the DNA evidence was unreliable and that the trial court had failed to declare a mistrial after a juror allegedly discussed the case out of court. This appeal was subsequently denied by Justice Bert Richardson, who noted that the appeal strained credulity. As of September 2022, Jenkins remains on death row at the Huntsville Unit and continues to appeal his sentence.

== Potentially related cases ==
Following Jenkins' conviction for the Norris murder, he was proposed as a suspect in three additional murders committed between 1975 and 1977: the December 1976 murder of Nancy Frese and April 1977 murder of Linda Hopwood in San Antonio, and the May 1975 murder of Jane Ellen Kidder at Camp Lejeune in Jacksonville, North Carolina.

On May 26, 1975, the 18-year-old Kidder, a private first class from Salem, Ohio, went on a walk along West Onslow Beach with some friends, but while the remainder of her group were not paying attention, she went missing. After she failed to return to Camp Lejeune, she was immediately reported missing and a search was initiated by Marine Corps officials and the local sheriff's office. She remained a missing person until January 10, 1978, when a logger found a human skeleton buried under leaves and pine straw off a pulpwood road. After excavating the site for additional bones and personal items, the local coroner positively identified the remains as those of Kidder via her dental records. At the time, newspaper reports stated that an unnamed convict from Texas had confessed to killing a woman near the beach and leaving her body nearby, but was not convicted of the murder.

Less than a year later, the body of 24-year-old Nancy Jane Frese, a secretary for the Bexar County Courthouse in San Antonio, was found on a ranch near the Route 281 on February 24, 1977. She had been reported missing on December 17, 1976, after she failed to return to work after a lunch break, and upon inspecting her body, authorities deduced that she had been sexually assaulted, strangled with a sash and had apparently defended herself from her attacker judging by wounds on her hands. In April, the partially-undressed body of another woman, 29-year-old office worker Linda Hopwood, was found in a wooded area close to the Frese crime scene. Like the previous victim, she had been sexually assaulted and had defensive wounds, but had been strangled with her own bra and had apparently been beaten on the head. Contemporary investigations attempted to collect blood samples from the body and inspected a car that they might have been linked to the crime, but no results came from this inquiry.

Initially, authorities from the sheriff's department were skeptical that the two cases were related and focused their attention solely on the Hopwood case. On May 12, her wallet and ID were found near by a highway crew on Borgfeld Road, only a couple of miles away from where her body was found, but no additional clues were located. Eventually, a $2,500 reward was offered to anyone who could provide information about these two murders and another unrelated case, which could be submitted through a secret witness program.

At one point, notorious murderer Henry Lee Lucas claimed responsibility for killing both Frese and Hopwood, but like the majority of his confessions, it was determined that it had been false. As of February 2025, Jenkins has not been charged in any of the three murders, but is presumably still considered a suspect in all of them.

== See also ==
- Henry Lee Lucas
- Capital punishment in Texas
- List of death row inmates in the United States § Texas
