= Back n da Hood =

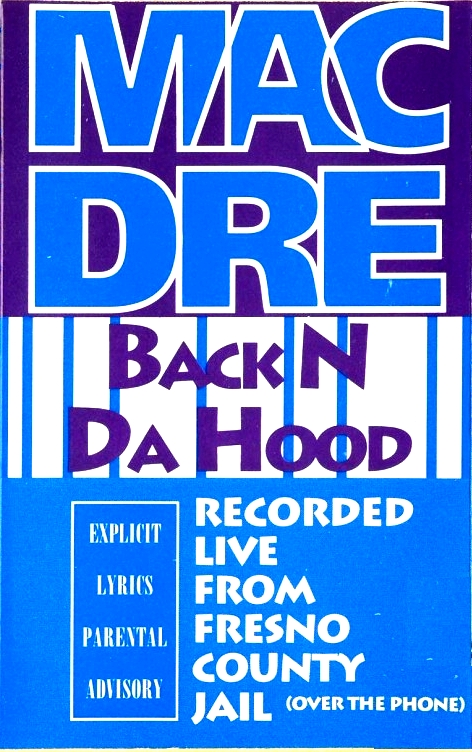

EP by Mac Dre
- Released: 1992
- Recorded: 1992, Fresno County Jail and U.S.P. Lompoc
- Genre: West Coast hip hop; gangsta rap
- Length: 21:41; 31:41 (2005 reissue)
- Label: Strictly Business Records; Thizz
- Producer: Khayree

Mac Dre chronology
What's Really Going On? (1992)	Back n da Hood (1992)	Young Black Brotha (1993)

Back n da Hood is a 1992 EP by hyphy Bay Area rapper Mac Dre. It was recorded live from the Fresno County Jail and USP Lompoc over the phone. Its lyrics are about life in Fresno County Jail, and about himself in early life.

The original issue of this album was only on cassette. It was reissued on CD in 1998 and later in 2005 with two bonus tracks taken from Young Black Brotha.

== Track listing ==
No.	Title	Length
1.	"Back n da Hood"	5:26
2.	"'93"	5:32
3.	"Love Dat Donkey"	5:22
4.	"My Chevy"	1:28
5.	"It Don't Stop"	3:52
6.	"I'm N Motion" (Only on 2005 CD)	5:45
7.	"Young Mac Dre" (Only on 2005 CD)	4:17

"'93" has an unlisted vignette containing a section of "It Don't Stop" following it. The vignette was indexed as a separate track on the 1998 CD of Back 'n da Hood, but was integrated into "'93" on the 2005 issue. "I'm 'n Motion" takes its name from a line in the 1989 song "Too Hard for the Fuckin' Radio" from the Young Black Brotha EP:

Like lotion, I'm in motion

— Andre Hicks, "Too Hard for the Fuckin' Radio", 1988
