= Starters in the Game =

Studio album by Mac Dre
- Released: February 5, 2007 (U.S.)
- Genre: Rap, hyphy, hip hop
- Label: Siccness

Mac Dre chronology
16 Wit Dre, Vol. 2 (2006)	Starters in the Game (2007)	Pill Clinton (2007)

Starters in the Game is a 2007 compilation album by hyphy Bay Area rapper Mac Dre.

== Track listing ==
1. "Ice Cream" (featuring Brotha Lynch Hung)
2. "Gangsta Mac" (featuring Turf Talk, Yukmouth)
3. "Unreleased" (featuring Sidewayz)
4. "Hella Dumb" (featuring Mistah F.A.B.)
5. "84 to 2004" (Remix, featuring Chop the Hook Man, Dubee, Mistah F.A.B.)
6. "When I Step Up in Here" (featuring Dubee)
7. "I Don't" (featuring Sidewayz)
8. "Get Them Chips" (featuring I-Rocc, Sidewayz)
9. "What a Hit We Made"
10. "I Won't If You Won't Tell" (featuring Rydah J. Klyde, Lil' Tre, Chop the Hook Man)
11. "Do My Thang" (featuring Dubee, Johnny Cash, Mac Mall)
12. "Boss Status" (featuring J. Diggs, Lil Evil, Guce)
13. "Tuck Yo Bitch" (featuring PSD, Peanut, Money Gang)
14. "Cash Withdraws" (featuring I-Rocc, Sidewayz)
15. "Thizz in Peace" (Mac Dre Tribute, featuring Yukmouth, J. Diggs, Mistah F.A.B.)
