= Thizzelle Washington =

Studio album by Mac Dre
- Released: August 27, 2002
- Recorded: 2002
- Genre: Hyphy
- Label: Thizz
- Producer: Syko

Mac Dre chronology
| It's Not What You Say... It's How You Say It (2001) | Thizzelle Washington (2002) | Al Boo Boo (2003) |

Thizzelle Washington is the seventh full-length album by the late Bay Area rapper Mac Dre. Released in 2002, this album introduced the "Thizzle Dance", based on the track of the same name.

== Track listing ==
1. "Intro" - 1:37 (featuring Yukmouth)
2. "Monday Thru Sunday" - 4:23 (featuring Syko)
3. "Stuart Littles" - 3:30
4. "Help Me" - 4:31 (featuring Freako, Rydah J. Klyde)
5. "The Mac Named Dre" - 4:26
6. "Dam I Used to Know That (Interlude)" - 2:07
7. "Boss Tycoon" - 4:12 (featuring Yukmouth)
8. "4 Myself" - 4:05 (featuring Devious, Dubee)
9. "C.U.T.T.H.O.A.T." - 4:37 (featuring Cutthoat Committee)
10. "Han Solo" - 3:37 (featuring Syko)
11. "Rap Life" - 4:06 (featuring Sleep Dank)
12. "Thizzle Dance" - 4:04 (featuring Chuck Beez)
13. "Soom Lama (Interlude)" - 2:52
14. "Big Breaded" - 4:25 (featuring Luni Coleone)
15. "Dollalalala Lotsa Paypa" - 3:12 (featuring KC Bobcat, Sauce)
16. "Miss You" - 3:19
