= Revenue Retrievin': Night Shift =

Studio album by E-40
- Released: March 30, 2010
- Recorded: 2009–2010
- Genre: Hip hop
- Length: 75:43
- Label: Heavy on the Grind; EMI
- Producer: E-40 (exec.); Rick Rock; Jazze Pha; Droop-E; D-Animals; Hallway Productionz; JHawk; Tha Bizness; Young L

E-40 chronology
Revenue Retrievin': Day Shift (2010)	Revenue Retrievin': Night Shift (2010)	Revenue Retrievin': Overtime Shift (2011)

Singles from Revenue Retrievin': Night Shift
- 1. "The Server" Released: 2010

Professional ratings
Review scores
Source	Rating
AllMusic	3/5 stars
DJ Booth	3.5/5 stars
HipHopDX	3/5 stars
RapReviews	7.5/10
XXL	4/5 stars

Revenue Retrievin': Night Shift is the twelfth studio album by American rapper E-40. It was released on March 30, 2010, by Heavy on the Grind Entertainment and EMI. His eleventh album, Revenue Retrievin': Day Shift, was released on the same day.

Night Shift features 19 tracks including guest appearances from Snoop Dogg, Too Short, Ya Boy, Bobby V, Keak da Sneak, San Quinn and many others. With this album, E-40 was the first hip hop artist to release two major studio albums on the same day since Nelly released Sweat and Suit in 2004.

Music videos have been filmed for the songs "Over the Stove", "Nice Guys", "Can't Stop the Boss" featuring Snoop Dogg, Too Short, and Jazze Pha, "Show Me What You Workin' Wit'" featuring Too Short, "He's a Gangsta" featuring Messy Marv, The Jacka of Mob Figaz, and Kaveo, "Spend the Night" featuring Laroo, the DB'z, Droop-E, and B-Slimm, and "The Server". The latter would be released as a promo single on February 23, 2010, to iTunes.

== Commercial performance ==
In its first two weeks Revenue Retrievin': Night Shift sold 57,000 copies. It has sold 106,000 copies as of May 3, 2010.

== Track listing ==
No.	Title	Producer(s)	Length
1.	"Over the Stove"	Rick Rock	4:30
2.	"Nice Guys"	Rick Rock	3:55
3.	"Can't Stop the Boss" (featuring Snoop Dogg, Too Short & Jazze Pha)	Jazze Pha	3:14
4.	"Show Me What You Workin' Wit'" (featuring Too Short)	Droop-E	4:06
5.	"How I'm Feeling Right Now"	Droop-E	3:52
6.	"Knock 'Em Down Music" (featuring Ya Boy, Turf Talk & Cousin Fik)	D-Animals	4:34
7.	"Stilettos & Jeans" (featuring Bobby V)	Hallway Productionz	3:56
8.	"He's a Gangsta" (featuring Messy Marv, The Jacka of Mob Figaz & Kaveo)	Droop-E	4:17
9.	"Spend the Night" (featuring Laroo, The DB'z, Droop-E & B-Slimm)	Droop-E	3:52
10.	"Wet" (featuring Ya Boy & Cousin Fik)	JHawk	3:24
11.	"Trained to Go" (featuring Laroo, The DB'z & Mac Shawn 100)	Tha Bizness	3:37
12.	"More Bass, More Treble" (featuring Cousin Fik & Turf Talk)	Young L	3:42
13.	"Ahhhh Shit!"	Droop-E	3:32
14.	"Turn Up the Music"	Rick Rock	3:27
15.	"Power Up" (featuring Keak da Sneak & San Quinn)	Droop-E	4:45
16.	"Prepared"	Rick Rock	4:10
17.	"Attention" (featuring Dru Down, Suga Free & Stompdown)	Droop-E	4:43
18.	"The Server"	Rick Rock	3:10
19.	"Let Go & Let God" (featuring Lenny Williams)	Droop-E	4:57

iTunes bonus tracks
No.	Title	Producer(s)	Length
20.	"Streets Keep Callin' Me" (featuring Krizz Kaliko & B-Slimm)	Droop-E	3:35
21.	"Move Mean" (featuring J-Diggs & Big Rich)	Droop-E	3:19

=== Notes ===
- Stressmatic is uncredited in "Over the Stove" and "Prepared".
- Laroo is uncredited in "Over the Stove".
- YV is uncredited in "More Bass, More Treble".

Sample credits

- "Show Me What You Workin' Wit'" - contains a sample of "Love Is the Answer" by The Stylistics
- "Stilettos & Jeans" - contains a sample of "Gucci Time" by Schoolly D
- "Spend the Night" - contains a sample of "Oceania" by Björk

== Charts ==
=== Weekly charts ===
Chart (2010)	Peak position
US Billboard 200	49
US Top R&B/Hip-Hop Albums (Billboard)	17
US Top Rap Albums (Billboard)	11
US Independent Albums (Billboard)	5

=== Year-end charts ===
Chart (2010)	Position
US Top R&B/Hip-Hop Albums (Billboard)	100
