= Callin' Me =

Callin' Me may refer to:

- "Callin' Me" (Lil' Zane song), 2000
- "Callin' Me", a song by Consequence from Don't Quit Your Day Job!, 2007
- "Callin' Me", a song by Mac from Shell Shocked, 1998
- "Callin Me", a song by PSD from All I Want, 2002
