= Heart of a Gangsta, Mind of a Hustla, Tongue of a Pimp =

Studio album by Mac Dre
- Released: May 22, 2000
- Genre: West Coast hip-hop; gangsta rap; hyphy
- Label: OutBac Records; Thizz
- Producer: No Face Phantom

Mac Dre chronology
Rapper Gone Bad (1999)	Heart of a Gangsta, Mind of a Hustla, Tongue of a Pimp (2000)	Mac Dre's the Name (2001)

Original cover

Heart of a Gangsta, Mind of a Hustla, Tongue of a Pimp is the fourth album by Bay Area rapper Mac Dre. Originally released on OutBac Records, on Ghetto Celebrities, Mac Dre makes reference to OutBac Records (James Ross, now known as Ehustle Entertainment) never paying him.

On both releases of the album, the title is misprinted as Heart of Gangsta, Mind of a Hustla, Tongue of a Pimp.

== Track listing ==
1. "Stayin' Alive"
2. "Don't Be a Punk" produced by No Face Phantom
3. "Let's Go Riden" (featuring Felicia White)
4. "Hy Phy" (featuring Keak da Sneak and PSD) produced by No Face Phantom
5. "Skit"
6. "Exo & Remi" Produced by No Face Phantom
7. "Punk Bitches (Vocal Remix Version)" (featuring Donte)
8. "Off tha Rictor (Radio)"
9. "Black Buck Rogers"
10. "Punk Bitches (Uncut Version)" (featuring Donte)
11. "Off tha Rictor (Uncut Version)"

== 2003 reissue ==
1. "Staying Alive"
2. "Don't Be a Punk"
3. "Let's Go Riden"
4. "Hy Phy" (featuring Keak da Sneak and PSD)
5. "Skit"
6. "Exo & Remi"
7. "Black Buck Rogers"
8. "Punk Bitches"
9. "Off tha Rictor"
10. "Hotta Den Steam" (featuring PSD)
11. "Everthang"
12. "Al Boo Boo" (featuring Miami tha Most)
13. "Stupid" (featuring Miami tha Most)
