= 16 wit Dre =

Remix album by Mac Dre
- Released: June 20, 2006
- Genre: Rap, hyphy, hip hop
- Label: Thizz

Mac Dre chronology
Uncut (2006)	16 wit Dre (2006)	16 Wit Dre, Vol. 2 (2006)

16 wit Dre is a 2006 mix album by hyphy Bay Area rapper Mac Dre, who was killed 2 1/2 years prior to the album's release, mixed by DJ Backside.

== Track listing ==
1. "DJ Backside"
2. "Home Wrecka"
3. "U.S. Open"
4. "U.G.A."
5. "Weekend"
6. "Fast Money" (featuring Warren G, Kokane & Dutches)
7. "Free Agents"
8. "P.I.M.P."
9. "Tizzle Drizzle"
10. "Extra Clip"
11. "Cutthoatish"
12. "Live Til' I Die"
13. "How You Feel"
14. "Crest"
15. "Say "Go""
16. "Game"
17. "A, B, C, P?"
18. "Thizz Music"
19. "Outta Range"
20. "Livin'"
21. "Yell It Out"
22. "Yo' Hood"
23. "Heat & Head"
24. "Mac Dre"
25. "Dope"
26. "Thizzlamic"
27. "Hubba Rock"
28. "Hip Hop Mega"
29. "Ask For"
30. "Game Go"
31. "Very Hot"
32. "Official Thizz DJ"
33. "Thizz Mountain"
