= Get Stupid =

Get Stupid may refer to one the following topics:

- "Get Stupid", a 2004 song on the Mac Dre album Ronald Dregan: Dreganomics
- Get Stupid!, a 2005 book by Trevor Strong of the comedy team The Arrogant Worms
- "Get Stupid", a 2008 video interlude by Madonna featured on her Sticky & Sweet Tour
- "Get Stupid" (song), a 2015 song on the Aston Merrygold album Show Stopper
