= You Ain't Heard of Me? =

Studio album by PSD
- Released: March 25, 2003
- Recorded: 2002–2003
- Genres: West Coast hip hop, gangsta rap
- Label: Gateway Entertainment
- Producers: PSD, Mac Dre, Tone Capone, Vincent Pietropaoli, Femi Ojetunde, Mike Mosley, DJ Fingahs, Lev Berlak

PSD chronology
All I Want (2002)	You Ain't Heard of Me? (2003)	The Guru (2005)

You Ain't Heard of Me? is the fifth album by the rapper PSD. It was released on March 25, 2003, for Gateway Entertainment and was produced by PSD, Mac Dre, Tone Capone, Vincent Pietropaoli, Femi Ojetunde, Mike Mosley, DJ Fingahs and Lev Berlak.

== Track listing ==
1. "Intro" - 0:52
2. "U Ain't Heard of Me" - 4:25
3. "Mississippi" - 4:01
4. "Hongry" - 3:52 (featuring Mac Dre)
5. "Bumpin Pie" - 3:26
6. "Asshole/Wholeass" - 0:38
7. "It's Over" - 5:01
8. "Pay Me" - 4:11
9. "Ain't Shit" - 3:50
10. "They Smile" - 5:36
11. "Getting Money" - 4:02 (featuring Yukmouth)
12. "Leave People Alone" - 0:44
13. "Naww...Yeahhh" - 4:11 (featuring B-Legit)
14. "Guillotine" - 3:20
15. "Big Thang of Coolaid" - 3:24
16. "What's the Method" - 3:59
17. "Cali Goodfellas" - 3:58 (featuring Replacement Killaz)
18. "Spent the Bread" - 2:48
19. "The Committee" - 3:34 (featuring Cut Throat Committee)
20. "West Block" - 3:33
21. "Just Livin'" - 3:24
