= Bitch (E-40 song) =

Single by E-40 featuring Too Short and 50 Cent

from the album Revenue Retrievin': Day Shift
- Released: March 30, 2010
- Recorded: 2009–2010
- Genre: West Coast hip hop, gangsta rap
- Length: 4:05
- Label: Heavy on the Grind Ent./Jive
- Songwriters: Earl Stevens, Todd Shaw, Vincent Tolan, Curtis Jackson
- Producer: Vincent "VT" Tolan

E-40 singles chronology
"Break Ya Ankles" (2008)	"Bitch" (2010)	"Function" (2012)

Too Short singles chronology
"Blow the Whistle" (2006)	"Bitch" (2010)	"On My Level" (2011)

"Bitch" censored as "B*tch" and "Trick" is a single by American rapper E-40 off his twelfth studio album Revenue Retrievin': Day Shift. The song features fellow West Coast American rapper and former label mate Too Short. The single is the only charting single of the Revenue Retrievin' series. The song receives airplay in the mix on radio stations such as Power 106 in Los Angeles. A popular remix was made also featuring 50 Cent who is featured on the single cover.

== Background ==
In Too Short's verse he points out what makes a man a "B I T C H" and E-40 discusses what makes a woman a "bitch."

== Music video ==
The music video was released via E-40's official YouTube account on March 11, 2010. In the video Too $hort and E-40 travel through green screen houses and malls, deconstructing the concept of being a "bitch."

== Remix ==
The official remix features American rapper 50 Cent and was officially released via his YouTube channel.

== Charts ==
Chart (2010)	Peak position
US Hot R&B/Hip-Hop Songs (Billboard)	80
US Hot Rap Songs (Billboard)	24
