= Stupid Doo Doo Dumb =

Studio album by Mac Dre
- Released: April 28, 1998
- Recorded: 1997–1998
- Genre: Hip-hop
- Length: 1:03:27
- Label: Romp
- Producers: Funk Daddy; Johnny Z; K-Lou

Mac Dre chronology
| Young Black Brotha (1993) | Stupid Doo Doo Dumb (1998) | Rapper Gone Bad (1999) |

Professional ratings
Review scores
| Source | Rating |
|---|---|
| AllMusic | 4/5 stars |

Stupid Doo Doo Dumb is the second full-length studio album by American rapper Mac Dre. It was released on April 28, 1998 through Romp Records. Produced by K-Lou, Funk Daddy and Johnny Z, it features guest appearances from Dubee, Mac Mall, Da Looie Crew, Coolio Da'Unda'Dogg, Infamizz, Jamar, JT the Bigga Figga, Naked, Reek Daddy, Shima, Sleep Dank and Spice 1.

The album debuted at number 60 on the Top R&B/Hip-Hop Albums and number 18 on the Heatseekers Albums charts in the United States, marking San Francisco Bay Area rapper's comeback following his prison sentence.

== Track listing ==
| No. | Title | Lyrics | Producer(s) | Length |
|---|---|---|---|---|
| 1. | "J.T.'s Intro (featuring JT the Bigga Figga)" | Joseph Thompson | K Lou | 1:19 |
| 2. | "Life's a Bitch" | Andre Louis Hicks | Funk Daddy | 6:17 |
| 3. | "Da Real Deal (featuring Dubee)" | Hicks; Major Norton | Funk Daddy | 4:28 |
| 4. | "3C Romp" | Hicks | K Lou | 3:38 |
| 5. | "Stupid Doo-Doo-Dumb (featuring Mac Mall & Miami The Most)" | Hicks; Jamal Rocker; Miami The Most | K Lou | 5:21 |
| 6. | "Crest Creepers (featuring Dubee, Jamar, Naked, Da' Unda' Dogg, Reek Daddy, and Mac Mall)" | Hicks; Norton; Jamar; Naked; Troy Deon Reddick; Mariko Nash; Rocker | Funk Daddy | 4:02 |
| 7. | "Hoes We Like (featuring Sleep Dank)" | Hicks; D. Johnson | Funk Daddy | 4:06 |
| 8. | "Nothin' Correctable" | Hicks | K Lou | 4:54 |
| 9. | "Freaky Shit" | Hicks | K Lou | 4:43 |
| 10. | "Real Niggas" | | | 4:02 |
| 11. | "Get Yo' Grits" | Hicks | Funk Daddy | 4:15 |
| 12. | "Hoez Love It (featuring Spice 1)" | Hicks; Robert Lee Greene Jr. | Funk Daddy | 3:45 |
| 13. | "All It Takes (featuring Shima)" | Hicks; Rashima Bellamy | K Lou | 5:01 |
| 14. | "I Need a Eighth (featuring Miami The Most, Rott Wilder, Dubee, Dope Dogg, and Reese)" | Hicks; Miami The Most; Rott Wilder; Norton; Dope Dogg; Reese | Johnny Z | 3:48 |
| 15. | "Let's All Get Down" | Hicks | | 3:48 |
| Total length: | | | | 1:03:27 |

== Charts ==
| Chart (1998) | Peak position |
|---|---|
| US Top R&B/Hip-Hop Albums (Billboard) | 60 |
| US Heatseekers Albums (Billboard) | 18 |
