= All I Want (PSD album) =

Studio album by PSD
- Released: February 12, 2002
- Recorded: 2001–2002
- Genre: West Coast hip hop, gangsta rap
- Label: Gateway Entertainment
- Producer: PSD, Studio Ton, Mike Mosley, E. Lee, Wilson Hankins, D-Bone, Lev Berlak, Phillip Armstrong

PSD chronology
What It Is (1999)	All I Want (2002)	You Ain't Heard of Me? (2003)

All I Want is the fourth album by American rapper PSD. It was released on February 12, 2002, for Gateway Entertainment and was produced by PSD, Studio Ton, Mike Mosley, E. Lee, Willson Hankins, D-Bone, Lev Berlak and Phillip Armstrong.

== Track listing ==
1. "Nasty Boy" - 4:28
2. "My Business" - 3:28
3. "Interlude" - 0:29
4. "Shitchyeah" - 3:23
5. "Golden State" - 4:55 (featuring E-40)
6. "Puff It" - 3:40
7. "All I Want" - 4:46
8. "Streets or Rap Game" - 4:08 (featuring Keak da Sneak)
9. "Fast Way" - 3:44 (featuring San Quinn, Mac Dre)
10. "Shiesty" - 3:17
11. "I Want That Thang" - 4:20
12. "Pink Part" - 4:14 (featuring Mac Mall)
13. "Some Thangs" - 4:20 (featuring Dubee)
14. "Callin Me" (The Green Room) - 4:28 (featuring Vital)
15. "When Them People Want You" - 4:45
