= Bread Head =

Studio album by PSD
- Released: February 9, 1999
- Recorded: 1998–1999
- Genre: West Coast hip hop, gangsta rap
- Label: Lightyear Records
- Producer: Baby Beesh, PSD, Jay Tee, Funk Daddy, Dave G., Jonny Z, Ephraim Galloway, Bernard Gourley

PSD chronology
Game Costs (1997)	Bread Head (1999)	What It Is (1999)

Professional ratings
Review scores
Source	Rating
Allmusic	2.5/5 stars

Bread Head is the second album by PSD. It was released on February 9, 1999, for Lightyear Records and was produced by Baby Beesh, PSD, Jay Tee, Funk Daddy, Dave G., Jonny Z, Ephraim Galloway and Bernard Gourley.

== Track listing ==
1. "So Cold" – 3:06 (featuring Young Wonder)
2. "Premeditated" (remix) – 3:45
3. "Hustler" – 3:54
4. "Tang & O.J." – 3:43
5. "Ménage a Trois" – 5:08 (featuring Dion)
6. "Every Damn Day" – 5:19 (featuring Mac Lee)
7. "The Ghetto" – 4:24 (featuring Mac Lee)
8. "Pepi Lepew Pimpin'" – 4:10 (featuring Mac Lee)
9. "Bread Head" – 3:41
10. "My Daily Bread" – 5:11
11. "Much Luv" – 5:19
12. "Ghetto" – 4:07
13. "The Prize" – 4:09
14. "Premeditated" – 3:15
