= Revenue Retrievin': Day Shift =

Studio album by E-40
- Released: March 30, 2010
- Recorded: 2009–2010
- Genre: Hip hop
- Length: 72:10
- Label: Heavy on the Grind; EMI
- Producer: E-40 (exec.); Droop-E; ProHoeZak; Vincent "VT" Tolan; Willy Will; D-Animals; Rick Rock; RAYTONA; DJ Toure; Decadez

E-40 chronology
The Ball Street Journal (2008)	Revenue Retrievin': Day Shift (2010)	Revenue Retrievin': Night Shift (2010)

Professional ratings
Review scores
Source	Rating
AllMusic	3.5/5 stars
DJ Booth	3.5/5 stars
RapReviews	7/10
XXL	4/5 stars

Revenue Retrievin': Day Shift is the eleventh studio album by American rapper E-40. It was released on March 30, 2010, by Heavy on the Grind Entertainment and EMI. His twelfth album, Revenue Retrievin': Night Shift, was released on the same day.

Day Shift features 19 tracks including guest appearances from Too Short, Gucci Mane, B-Legit, Mike Marshall, Suga T, J. Valentine, Droop-E and many others. With this album, E-40 was the first hip-hop artist to release two major studio albums on the same day since Nelly released Sweat and Suit in 2004.

Music videos have been filmed for the songs "Lightweight Jammin'" featuring Clyde Carson and Husalah of Mob Figaz, "Undastandz Me", "The Weedman" featuring Stressmatic, and "It's Gotta Get Betta" featuring Michael Marshall & Suga-T. It sold 74,000 copies in its first week. It has since sold over 352,000 copies.

== Track listing ==
No.	Title	Producer(s)	Length
1.	"Back in Business"	Droop-E	4:38
2.	"Whip It Up" (featuring Gucci Mane & YV)	ProHoeZak	3:18
3.	"Bitch" (featuring Too Short)	Vincent "VT" Tolan	3:25
4.	"Undastandz Me"	Droop-E	4:03
5.	"Duck"	Willy Will	3:24
6.	"I Get Down" (featuring B-Legit and Cousin Fik)	E-40	3:24
7.	"The Art of Story Tellin'"	Droop-E	4:17
8.	"Fuck You Right" (featuring J. Valentine)	D-Animals	3:01
9.	"This a Boy" (featuring Droop-E)	Rick Rock	4:05
10.	"I'ma Teach Ya How to Sell Dope"	Willy Will	4:29
11.	"The Weedman" (featuring Stressmatic)	Rick Rock	4:44
12.	"Lightweight Jammin'" (featuring Clyde Carson & Husalah of Mob Figaz)	RAYTONA	2:58
13.	"Everyday Is a Weekend" (featuring The Jacka of Mob Figaz)	DJ Toure	2:37
14.	"Got It"	Droop-E	3:24
15.	"Rick Rock Horns" (featuring Marty James of One Block Radius)	Rick Rock	4:15
16.	"Dem Boyz"	Willy Will	3:34
17.	"Outta Control" (featuring Dem Hoodstarz & Mistah F.A.B.)	Droop-E	3:35
18.	"All I Need"	D-Animals	4:46
19.	"It's Gotta Get Betta" (featuring Mike Marshall & Suga T)	Droop-E	5:07

iTunes Bonus Tracks
No.	Title	Producer(s)	Length
20.	"Ya Suppose To"	Droop-E	4:39
21.	"I'm in the Room" (featuring Mugzi)	Decadez	3:24

== Charts ==
=== Weekly charts ===
Chart (2010)	Peak position
US Billboard 200	47
US Top R&B/Hip-Hop Albums (Billboard)	15
US Top Rap Albums (Billboard)	21
US Independent Albums (Billboard)	4

=== Year-end charts ===
Chart (2010)	Position
US Top R&B/Hip-Hop Albums (Billboard)	98
