= Reebok insider trading case =

Insider trading scheme from 2004 to 2005

- Date: 2004-2005
- Type: Insider trading scandal

The Reebok insider trading case was an insider trading scheme that took place in 2004 and 2005 and involved tips from a Merrill Lynch investment banker, confidential information from Business Week and a grand juror, and trades by individuals in both the United States and Europe. The trades were largely orchestrated by David Pajčin, an ex-Goldman Sachs trader who was subsequently ordered to pay nearly $28 million in fines and judgments by the SEC.

== Background ==
David Pajčin was a Croatian trader who met Eugene Plotkin when both were employees of the investment bank Goldman Sachs. In 2004, Plotkin introduced Pajčin to his friend Stanislav Shpigelman, a Merrill Lynch investment banker, at a Russian day spa in lower Manhattan. Pajčin knew Jason Smith, a postal worker, from high school and was romantically involved with Monika Vujovic, also a Croatian immigrant who worked as an exotic dancer.

== Schemes ==
Shpigelman provided Pajčin and Plotkin with tips on upcoming mergers and acquisitions in return for payoffs. The largest trades that netted the vast majority of the case's profits stemmed from a single tip from Shpigelman about the upcoming acquisition of Reebok by Adidas-Salomon AG.

In addition to trading on tips from Shpigelman, Pajčin also traded on confidential information from Jason Smith, his high school friend, who was serving on a grand jury, and on non-public information from advance copies of Business Week provided by warehouse workers Nickolaus Shuster and Juan Renteria, who were paid by Pajčin and Plotkin for that information.

Pajčin placed trades in his own account and in the accounts of his aunt, Sonja Antičević, and his girlfriend, Monika Vujovic, based on these tips. In addition, a number of other individuals, most of them Croatian nationals, placed trades based on tips received by Pajčin and Plotkin from their inside sources.

== Investigation ==
The investigation of Pajčin began after regulators at the U.S. Securities and Exchange Commission noticed suspicious timing and unusually high trading volume before a corporate acquisition announcement. Pajčin's aunt, Sonja Antičević, a 63-year-old retired tailor from Omiš, Croatia who was living on a pension of about $263 a month and occasionally working as a cleaning lady, was found to have bought $130,000 of Reebok call options in the 2 days before Reebok was taken over by Adidas-Salomon AG and captured a profit of more than $2 million on that investment. She subsequently told reporters that she "never bought a stock" and had "no idea how that works."

In total, 8,675 Reebok options were traded on the two days before the merger announcement, more than 50 times the usual amount. The SEC discovered that a number of accounts involved in trading Reebok options over those two days had made other parallel trades over the prior months. This included accounts belonging to Monika Vujovic and several other Croatian nationals. Pajčin was arrested and began to cooperate with federal prosecutors.

== Aftermath and sentencing ==
Pajčin was arrested in 2005 and cooperated with the government. Subsequently, all of his co-conspirators were arrested in 2006. After pleading guilty to charges in the case in 2008, Pajčin was sentenced to time served. Several months after his release, Pajčin broke the terms of his probation and fled the United States. A warrant was issued for his arrest in April 2008. In 2010, Pajčin was ordered to pay a $7.7 million default judgment and $20.8 million in fines to the SEC.

- Plotkin pleaded guilty to conspiracy to commit securities fraud and eight counts of insider trading. In 2008, he was sentenced to 57 months imprisonment and ordered to pay a $10,000 fine.
- Shpigelman pleaded guilty to conspiracy to commit securities fraud and insider trading. In 2007, he was sentenced to 37 months imprisonment.
- Smith pleaded guilty to felony criminal contempt. In 2006, he was sentenced to 33 months imprisonment and ordered to pay a $6,000 fine.
- Shuster pleaded guilty to conspiracy to commit securities fraud and insider trading. In 2008, he was sentenced to time served.
- Renteria pleaded guilty to conspiracy to commit securities fraud and insider trading. In 2008, he was sentenced to 2 years probation.
