= Woodbridge Securities =

American Ponzi scheme

Woodbridge Securities (a/k/a Woodbridge Group of Companies) was a $1.2 billion Ponzi scheme run by CEO Robert H. Shapiro.

== The scheme ==
The fraud scammed approximately 8,400 victims of retail investors, many of them elderly. Woodbridge filed for bankruptcy in December 2017.

== December 2018 SEC charges ==
In December 2018, The Securities and Exchange Commission charged 13 individuals and 10 companies including television finance "guru" Jordan Elliot Goodman with fraud in connection with the Ponzi scheme, other figures included Alan H. New and David S. Knuth, co-owners of Synergy Investment Services.

== January 2019 disgorgement ==
On 28 January 2019, Woodbridge and its 281 related companies ordered by the U.S. District Court for the Southern District of Florida to pay $892 million in disgorgement, former CEO Robert Shapiro was ordered to pay a $100 million civil penalty and to disgorge more than $20 million in ill-gotten gains and interest.

== April 2019 federal indictment ==
On April 11, 2019 U.S. federal prosecutors charged the owner and two former executives of Woodbridge Group of Companies LLC with orchestrating a $1.3-billion Ponzi scheme involving 10,000 victims. Robert [H] Shapiro, the owner of the luxury-property company, and former directors of investments Dayne Roseman and Ivan Acevedo were charged in the Southern District of Florida with conspiracy to commit mail and wire fraud and substantive mail fraud counts, the Department of Justice (DOJ) said in a statement. Shapiro was ordered to be detained in prison, while Roseman and Acevedo were ordered to appear in the Southern District Florida for their arraignment, the date for which had not yet been scheduled. According to the indictment, Shapiro took about $35 million in investor money for his benefit, spending millions on personal expenses such as chartering private planes and buying luxury cars, a house, and paying personal income taxes and his ex-wife. The company had filed for bankruptcy in December 2017 citing costs of expansion, litigation and a government fraud investigation and was then sued by the SEC for allegedly running an investment fraud selling unregistered securities to raise funds to repay earlier investors. Woodbridge, which reached a deal with the government last year to appoint a new board and pay for legal representation for thousands of alleged victims, emerged from bankruptcy in February. Shapiro and Roseman were charged with substantive wire fraud counts and additionally, Shapiro was charged with conspiracy to commit money laundering and evasion of payment of federal income taxes, the DOJ said."The conspiracy ran from July 2012 to December 2017, and involved material misrepresentations and material omissions to investors in the sale of Woodbridge investments," the DOJ said. According to the SEC complaint, Acevedo and Roseman were responsible for hiring and training Woodbridge's sales force, and approving fraudulent marketing materials and sales scripts. They helped create the impression that Woodbridge was a legitimate operation when in reality it was a Ponzi scheme, the SEC said.

Shapiro, the court document said, restricted access to information concerning Woodbridge’s finances, meaning Roseman and Acevedo did not have knowledge of Woodbridge’s finances and were unaware that Shapiro was operating a Ponzi scheme by using new investor money to pay prior investors.

== August 2019 conviction and sentence ==
On August 7, 2019 Robert H. Shapiro, the former CEO of the Woodbridge Group of Companies, pled guilty and admitted in Miami federal court that he "misappropriated" between $25 million and $95 million of the investors' money to allow him and his family to pay for an estate in the Los Angeles area, chartered planes, global travel, jewellery, diamonds and vintage wines. Shapiro also collected artworks by Pablo Picasso, Marc Chagall, Pierre-August Renoir and Alberto Giacometti. Shapiro, 61, who was arrested in April, faces up to 20 years for wire and mail fraud conspiracy and an additional 5 years for tax evasion at his sentencing on Oct. 15 before U.S. District Judge Cecilia Altonaga. By pleading guilty, Shapiro avoided going to trial and is currently serving a 25 year sentence.
