= Young Black Brotha (album) =

Studio album by Mac Dre
- Released: November 29, 1993
- Recorded: 1988–1993, Fresno County Jail and various studios
- Genre: West Coast hip hop; gangsta rap; G-funk
- Length: 74:24
- Label: Strictly Business Records
- Producer: Khayree

Mac Dre chronology
Young Black Brotha (1993)	Stupid Doo Doo Dumb (1998)

Professional ratings
Review scores
Source	Rating
RapReviews	10/10
AllMusic	4/5 stars

Young Black Brotha is the 1993 debut LP by Mac Dre, not to be confused with an earlier Mac Dre release, Young Black Brotha (EP). The album contains several new recordings as well as most of the tracks from the rapper's previous EP, What's Really Going On?, and three tracks from the sessions for Back N' Da Hood, including the full version of "My Chevy" featuring Mac Mall – the first 1 and a half minutes appeared on the original EP. Some of Mac Dre's vocals were recorded over the phone from prison, after being incarcerated for a string of bank robberies in 1992. Young Black Brotha peaked at #93 on the R&B/Hip-Hop Albums chart, making it Mac Dre's most commercially successful work. It is the final Mac Dre release to be produced by Khayree.

On May 18, 2025, Italian record label Armabillion Recordz reissued Young Black Brotha as a double LP, limited to 350 copies.

== Track listing ==
Romp Side
No.	Title	Originally appeared on...	Length
1.	"2 Hard 4 the Fuckin' Radio" (Printed on the back cover as "2 Hard 4 the F--ckin' Radio")	Young Black Brotha EP (1989)	4:56
2.	"All Damn Day"	What's Really Going On? EP (1992)	3:50
3.	"2 the Double R" (featuring Coolio da Unda Dogg)	New recording	2:33
4.	"On My Toes"	What's Really Going On?	3:58
5.	"Get Some Get Right"	New recording	3:02
6.	"Young Playah"	What's Really Going On?	5:03
7.	"California Livin'" (featuring Coolio da Unda Dogg)	California Livin' EP (1991)	4:36
8.	"This is The Mac" (performed by Khayree and The Mac)	New recording	5:18
9.	"I'm n Motion"	New recording; later appeared on 2005 re-release of Back n da Hood EP (1992)	5:44
10.	"Nothin' Correctable" (Interlude)	New recording	0:12
Total length:			39:12

Crest Side
No.	Title	Originally appeared on...	Length
11.	"They Don't Understand" (featuring Ray Luv)	New recording	4:21
12.	"Young Black Brotha"	Young Black Brotha EP	5:14
13.	"The Romp Ya'll"	New recording	2:15
14.	"My Chevy" (featuring Mac Mall)	Full version of a track from Back n da Hood	3:21
15.	"The M.A.C. and Mac D.R.E." (featuring The Mac)	New recording	5:01
16.	"Young Mac Dre"	New recording; later appeared on 2005 re-release of Back n da Hood	4:17
17.	"Much Love 4 the Mac"	What's Really Going On?	1:40
18.	"Gift 2 Gab"	California Livin	5:30
19.	"A Piece from Khayree" (performed by Khayree)	California Livin	2:51
20.	"U Still Punk Police"	Shortened version of a track from What's Really Going On?	0:24
21.	"Out the Water" (Interlude)	New recording	0:18
Total length:			35:13
