= Ronald Dregan: Dreganomics =

2004 studio album by Mac Dre

Studio album by Mac Dre
- Released: July 20, 2004
- Genres: Hip-hop; hyphy
- Length: 43:28
- Label: Thizz
- Producers: Sean T; Gennessee; Sweet Geez; Lev Berlak; Swampkat; Focus...; Jonan Whale

Mac Dre chronology
Al Boo Boo (2003)	Ronald Dregan: Dreganomics (2004)	The Genie of the Lamp (2004)

Ronald Dregan: Dreganomics is the ninth studio album by Vallejo, California rapper Mac Dre, released four months before his murder in 2004. It most notably features "Get Stupid", which has been described as "perhaps the defining song of the hyphy movement".

== Critical reception ==
Professional ratings
Review scores
Source	Rating
RapReviews	9/10
AllMusic	3/5 stars

DJ Complejo of RapReviews gave the album a rating of 9 out of 10, writing, "On Ronald Dregan Mac Dre was at the top of his lyrical game as well as showcasing just as well he had mastered his flow over the years".

David Jeffries of AllMusic said of the album: "Plenty of limited comedy rap acts with cults built around them have run out of steam long before they ran out of albums. Ronald Dregan is sleazy, unpretentious proof that Mac Dre isn't one of them. His albums all sound the same, and for once, that's a good thing."

== Track listing ==
Ronald Dregan: Dreganomics track listing
No.	Title	Producer(s)	Length
1.	"Feelin' Myself"	Sean T	3:44
2.	"Fa My Niggaz"	Gennessee	3:45
3.	"Jump It"	Sweet Geez	3:41
4.	"Witme??"	Lev Berlak	2:58
5.	"Me Damac"	Lev Berlak	3:49
6.	"Dreganomics"	Gennessee	4:10
7.	"Since '84"	Swampkat	4:10
8.	"That's Wusup"	Swampkat	4:04
9.	"On The Run"	Gennessee	3:10
10.	"Get Stupid"	Focus...	4:02
11.	"2 Night"	Jonan Whale	2:22
12.	"Don't Snitch"	Sean T	3:27
Total length:			43:28

== See also ==
- Ronald Reagan in music
