= Keely Shaye Smith =

American TV journalist (born 1963)

- Born: September 25, 1963 (age 63); Vallejo, California, U.S.
- Occupations: Journalist; author; television host; actress; director; producer
- Years active: 1986–present
- Spouse: Pierce Brosnan (m. 2001)
- Children: 2

Keely Shаye Smith Brosnan (born September 25, 1963), also known as Keely Shaye Brosnan, is an American journalist, author, television host, actress, producer, and director.

== Early life ==
Smith was born in 1963 in Vallejo, California but then lived in Hawaii. When she was five years old, she moved to Southern California. Her first elementary school was on the beach and she developed an appreciation for the ocean there. She grew up in Newport and Huntington Beach, "I can still see the wheat and strawberry fields in my mind and those incredibly long stretches of gorgeous unspoiled beaches with sand dunes... those areas including Laguna Beach, inspired me."

As a child she worked to help save the Bolsa Chica wetlands. "We took many field trips to collect trash on the beaches and around the wetlands... We then used the money from recycling to take trips to Yosemite, Catalina, Death Valley, and Dana Point to study ecology... I applaud the teachers who created that program." After college, in 1984 Smith moved to New York City to pursue an acting and modeling career and she especially appreciated getting to travel to exotic locations. In 3 1/2 years she filmed 25 commercials.

== Career ==
In 1986, Smith appeared with Huey Lewis in the MTV music video "Stuck with You" and in 1990 appeared as Valerie Freeman for one season on General Нospital (1990). She was an environmental correspondent for six years for Home on ABC earning her two Genesis Аwards, a Special Achievement Award at the 1991 Environmental Film Festival, and a nomination from the Environmental Media Association (EMA). Women in Film, the Natural Resources Defense Council, EMA, Earth Communications Office, Heal the Bay, Oceana, Senator Barbara Boxer, The Malibu Times, and Organic Style Magazine have all honored Smith for her ongoing commitment to the environment.

Smith served as a correspondent for NBC's primetime hit show Unsolved Mysteries from 1995 to 1997 in the show's "phone center", providing information on updated stories as well as for "special bulletin" segments. She was a gardening expert and correspondent for ABC's Good Morning America and Mike and Maty, as well as an entertainment correspondent for NBC's Today Show, CBS' Entertainment Tonight, and World Entertainment Report. on HBO. Additionally, she hosted Great Bears, a series for the Outdoor Life Network. As a TV producer, Smith created and hosted an eco-friendly home and garden how-to show called Home Green Home for PBS. She sees the environment as being deeply connected to human well-being, emphasizing the importance of clean air and water over other concerns. Gardening serves as a form of meditation, offering simple pleasures like cutting her own flowers or harvesting her own vegetables.

Smith made her directorial debut and produced the documentary film Poisoning Paradise (2017); the film delves into the seemingly idyllic world of Native Hawaiians, whose communities are surrounded by experimental test sites for genetically engineered seed corn and pesticides. She served as an executive producer for the 2022 documentary Women of the White Buffalo, which explores the lives and experiences of Native American women enduring the impacts of colonialism in South Dakota.

== Activism ==
From 1995 to 2000, Smith and actor Pierce Brosnan, her future husband, worked with the Natural Resources Defense Council and the International Fund for Animal Welfare to stop a proposed salt factory from being built at Laguna San Ignacio in Baja California Sur, Mexico. They are committed to environmental education in the classroom for grades K-12 and sponsor long-time friend Jane Goodall's Roots & Shoots youth and humanitarian program.

In Spring 2007, the couple also successfully fought the Cabrillo Port Liquefied Natural Gas facility which was proposed to be built off the coast in Oxnard and Malibu; the State Lands Commission eventually denied a lease to build the terminal. In May 2007, they donated $100,000 to help replace a playground on the island of Kauai in Hawaii. In 2009, Pierce Brosnan and Keely Shaye Smith visited the White House to help Representative William Delahunt of Massachusetts and Eni Faleomavaega, a delegate from American Samoa, introduce legislation to close loopholes on commercial and scientific whaling worldwide. In May 2009, Smith and Brosnan testified in Washington, D.C. before the Environmental Protection Agency in support of the new Climate Change Bill (known as the American Clean Energy and Security Act).

Smith directed and produced the award-winning documentary film Poisoning Paradise about the toxic agricultural environment of Kauai.

== Personal life ==
Smith met Pierce Brosnan on a beach in Mexico in 1994. They married at Ballintubber Abbey in County Mayo, Ireland, on August 4, 2001. They have two sons.
