= Fresno County Jail =

Jail in California, U.S.

Fresno County Jail (FCJ)
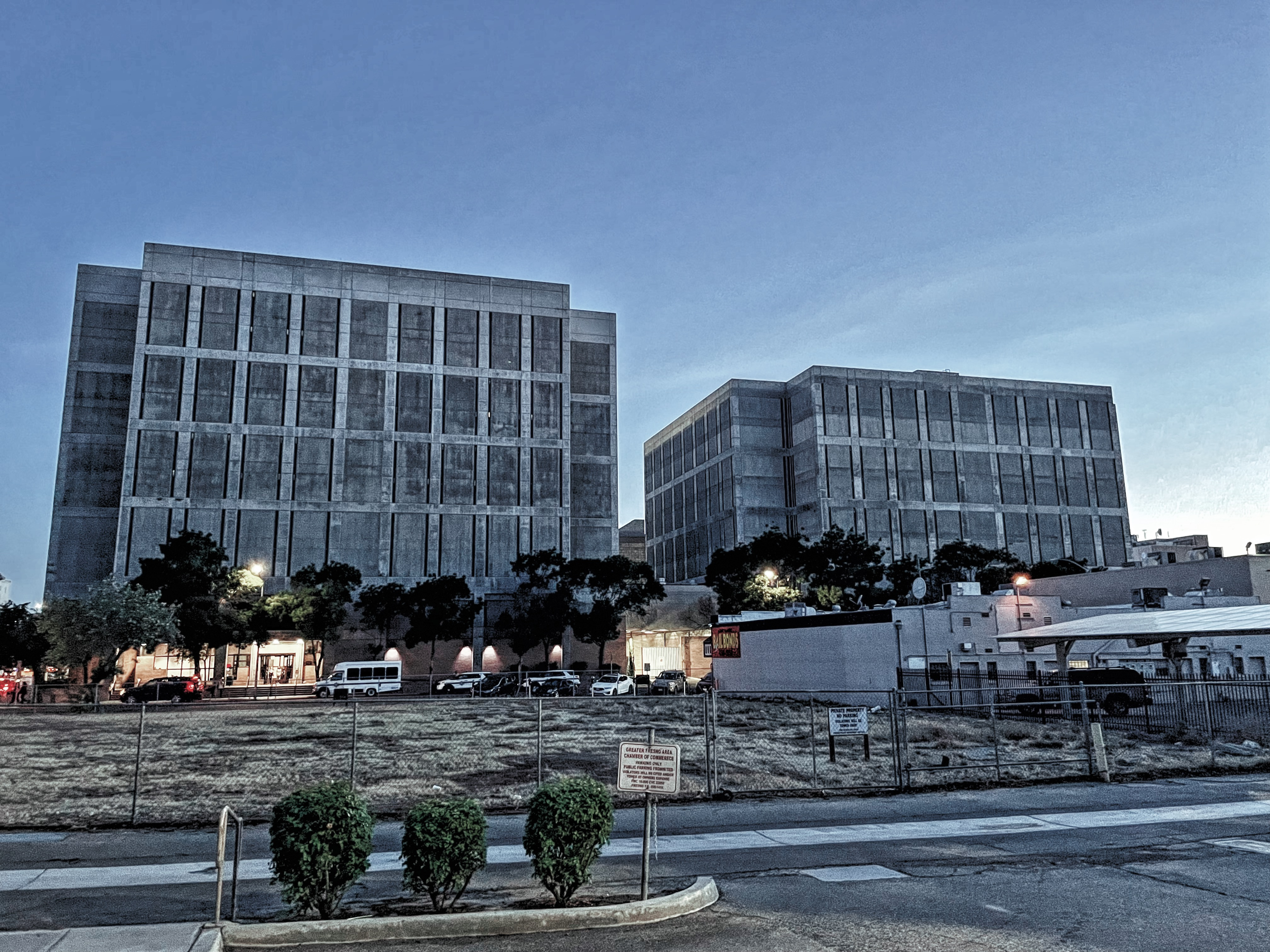
- Interactive map of Fresno County Jail (FCJ)
- Location: Fresno, California, U.S.; 36.737°N 119.792°W
- Status: Operational
- Security class: Minimum-maximum
- Capacity: 3,814
- Population: 2,746 (March 31st, 2020)
- Opened: 1947; 79 years ago
- Managed by: Fresno County Sheriff's Office

The Fresno County Jail is a detention center made up of three different adjacent complexes, located at 1225 M. Street, in downtown Fresno, California, operated by the Fresno County Sheriff's Department. The facility is made up of the Main Jail, the North Annex Jail, and the South Annex Jail and is connected by an underground system of tunnels providing easy and safe transportation of inmates. These tunnels also connect to the nearby Fresno County Courthouse. As of March 31, 2020, the Fresno County Jail had 2,746 inmates with 2,490 being male and 256 being female. The Fresno County Jail has recorded the highest number of deaths out of any county jail in California.

The Fresno County Jail processes and secures detainees from law enforcement agencies within Fresno County along with State and Federal inmates. In addition, the Fresno County Sheriff's Department also runs a Satellite Jail located two miles away from the main facility. The maximum inmate capacity for the Main Jail is 1,101, North Jail is 1,728, South Jail is 500, and Satellite Jail is 350, for a combined maximum capacity of 3,814 inmates who are supervised by over 350 correctional officers. The South Annex Jail was built in 1947, the Satellite Jail in 1986, the Main Jail built in 1989, and the North Annex Jail built in 1993. The jail is also connected above ground to the Fresno County Sheriff's Office and is adjacent to the Fresno Police Department, Fresno U.S. Marshals field office, Fresno DEA field office, and multiple courthouses. The average number of bookings processed annually into the Jail is 42,012.

== Facility layout ==
=== Main Jail ===
The Main Jail has six general housing floors, each having its own medical treatment area. The Main Jail houses a male only population except for the 6th floor which houses 10 single cells for female detainees, with all other living areas containing cells housing one to three detainees, there are no dormitories in this section. There are seven separate wings housing specific detainees as classified by the population management team. These separate wings are used to house inmates associated with different gangs, since some groups cannot be held together. Correctional officers say the three largest security threat groups are the Fresno Bulldogs, Norteños, and Sureños. This complex also includes a pharmacy, x-ray room, laboratory area, treatment room, two negative pressure cells, and two dental operatories. The only outdoor recreation yard for the whole facility is also located on the roof of this complex.

=== North Annex ===
The North Annex Jail has five general housing floors, with the majority housing minimum security male inmates. All housing units in this Annex consist of dormitory style living with detainees sleeping in bunk beds in an open area. An adjacent dayroom is available in each wing to watch television and participate in passive recreational and program activities. The North Jails classification varies for general population with inmates that are gang members, felons, or inmates with misdemeanors.

=== South Annex ===
The South Annex Jail is the original main jail facility and houses the entire female population. The Annex consists of four housing unit floors with a security office located on each floor and a central control area that monitors and controls detainee movement. The majority of the South Annex Jail consists of dormitory style living with the exception of 17 separate cells housing high security lockdown offenders. The psychiatric unit also operates out of this Annex.

=== Satellite Jail ===
The Satellite Jail was constructed as a "temporary facility" to house overflow inmates from the overcrowded old Main Jail, now the Satellite Annex. It is used as a training and storage area for the county.

== Inmate services ==
The Delma Graves Adult School is administered by the Fresno County Office of Education and offers literacy, Adult Basic Education and General Education Development, English as a second language, and personal life skills development education. Some of the other programs and services offered include religious programs, recreational reading library services, legal research access, drug and alcohol education, and Alcoholics and Narcotics Anonymous meetings and resources.

== Incidents and concerns ==
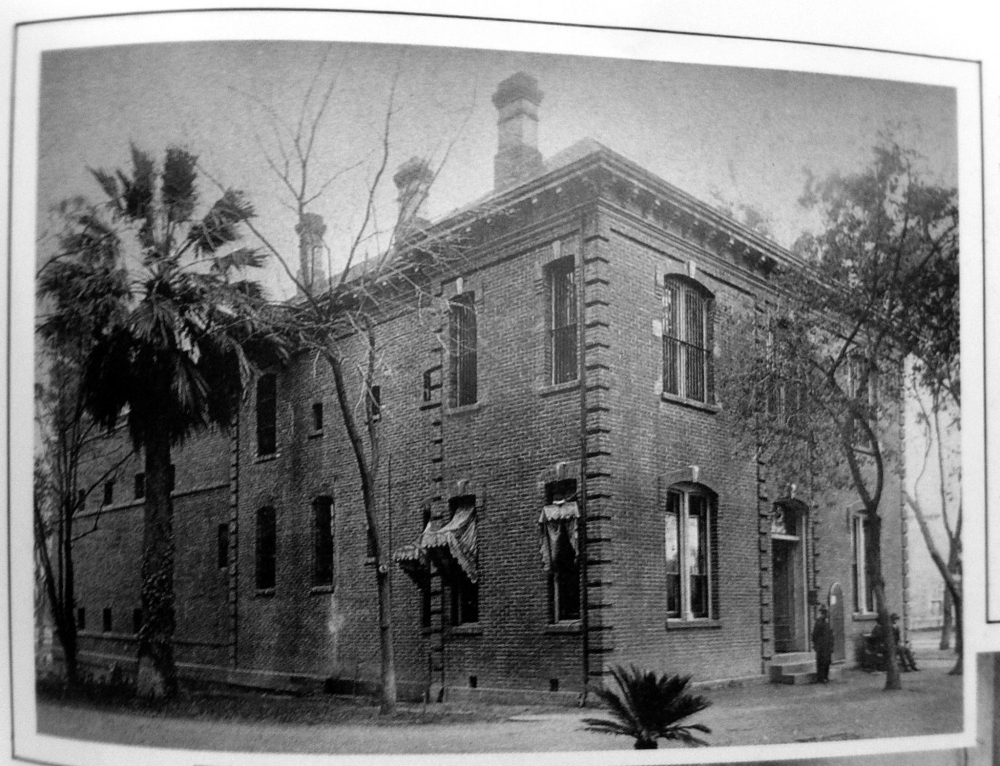
The old Fresno County Jail, built in 1880, demolished in 1957

On November 15, 2015, David Riggens, a 19-year-old sex offender, switched his identification bracelet with another inmate who was due to be released that day and walked out of the jail after being mistakenly identified. Riggens was caught and arrested only a few hours later. This was one of the only times an inmate successfully escaped the jail.

On the morning of September 3, 2016, an active shooter alert was sent out from the Fresno County Jail. At 8:30 a.m. Thong Vang walked into the Fresno County Jail lobby and shot two correctional officers with a handgun before being subdued. The two correctional officers were wounded. One had non-life-threatening injuries and one was gravley wounded. Both were taken to the hospital. One officer remained in a semi vegetative state and hospitalized until their death in 2021. 2018 Vang would be sentenced to 112 years for the act, where he is now serving at Wasco State Prison. In 2019, the incident was featured on a national crime show, which aired on Investigation Discovery.

In January 2018, Ernest Brock, Lorenzo Herera, and Andre Erkins were booked into the Fresno County Jail in a 48-hour stretch. Within three days Brock was beaten into a coma, and not two months after that, Herera was strangled to death and Erkins died of cardiac arrest, alone in his cell. This made national news headlines, and by the end of 2018, 11 inmates had died from untreated drug or alcohol withdrawal, suicide, medical negligence, and murder while another 13 inmates were beaten and hospitalized. From 2011 to 2018, 47 deaths have occurred at the facility.

One concern at the jail which has been arising since the early 1990s is gang behavior and gang violence between the large Hispanic gangs, particularly the Fresno Bulldogs, Norteños, and Sureños. At the heart of the problem is the Fresno Bulldogs, who have participated in over 32 battles with other prison gangs over the last year, ranging from small fights to full-scale prison riots, according to data prepared for the AP by the inspector general's office. Many correctional officers have often stated the members of Fresno's notorious Bulldogs gang have been particularly resistant to peacemaking, with gang members brawling in what critics labeled “gladiator fights”. The Bulldogs are the most violent of any group, while maintaining control of being the largest gang in the Fresno County Jail.

== Creation of the SERT team ==
To combat the severely overcrowded conditions, growing gang violence, and increase in inmate disturbances, the Fresno County Sheriff's Department Jail Division created the Security Emergency Response and Tactics (SERT) Team in 1983. Another reason the department created the team was because fires in the downtown facilities had become an almost routine occurrence, and firefighter attempts to extinguish the flames were thwarted by the adverse actions of inmates throwing objects and blowing darts through jail-made blowguns. The SERT Team was called upon to remove the inmates from the burning areas before fire personnel could enter the housing units to extinguish the fires. The team consists of 16 officers and 4 sergeants, commanded by a lieutenant. SERT's primary function is the immediate response and quelling of inmate disturbances. The Team responds with specialized weapons and tactical training that enables them to suppress any facility threats.

== Notable inmates ==
- Clarence Ray Allen: Clarence Allen was the last inmate to be executed in the state of California. Allen was executed on January 17, 2006, at San Quentin State Prison, after ordering a hit from within prison, killing the two people who had informed on him for murder. In addition, while in the Fresno County Jail on June 27, 1981, Allen called a “death penalty” vote for an inmate and directed an attack in which inmates scalded the target with two gallons of hot water, tied him to the cell bars and beat him, shot him with a zip gun, a type of improvised firearm, and threw razor blades and excrement at him.
- Mac Dre: Mac Dre was a well known American rapper who died in November 2004. While incarcerated at the Fresno County Jail, Mac Dre recorded his EP, Back n da Hood Recorded Live From the Fresno County Jail, in 1992. It was recorded over the phone and talked about life inside the Fresno correctional facility.
- Kori Ali Muhammad: Muhammad was arrested for the racially charged murder of 4 white men during the 2017 Fresno shootings.
- Marcus Wesson: Wesson is currently on death row at San Quentin State Prison after the incest and murder of his 2 daughters and their 7 children in the family home of Fresno, California in 2004. Fresno police said they found the daughters and their children, stacked on top of each other, all 9 ranging from 1 to 25 years old. He is considered the worst mass murderer of Fresno, California.
- Johnny Avila: Avila is a death row inmate at San Quentin State Prison, convicted of raping and killing 2 women after a party in Fresno, California during 1991. At the time, his trial had garnered lots of media attention.
- Billy Xiong & Anthony Montes: Xiong and Montes were arrested for the 2019 Fresno shooting at a neighborhood NFL football watch party that resulted in 4 deaths and 6 injuries in Fresno, California. The incident made multiple national news headlines after it was California's third mass shooting in less than a week. It took multiple weeks, but Billy Xiong was eventually arrested in Clovis, California by the Clovis Police Department, with the Fresno Police Department arresting multiple others shortly after. Both men face 4 counts of homicide, 12 counts of attempted homicide, and conspiracy to commit murder with gang and firearms enhancements.
- Wilbur Lee Jennings: Jennings was Fresno County's only convicted serial killer, and served over 25 years on death row at San Quentin State Prison before his death in February 2014. He was convicted of killing 5 different women throughout the 1980s, but authorities say they think the number of victims is higher, as he is currently the prime suspect in a total of 9 homicide cases. Jennings was known as the "ditch-bank killer".
