= Young Black Brotha (EP) =

EP by Mac Dre
- Released: 1989
- Recorded: 1988, Remix Studios, Oakland, California
- Genre: West Coast hip hop
- Length: 25:30 (LP); 20:52 (MC)
- Label: Strictly Business Records
- Producer: Khayree

Mac Dre chronology
| Young Black Brotha (1989) | California Livin' (1991) |

Young Black Brotha is Californian rapper Mac Dre's debut release. It was issued in 1989 on cassette and the following year on vinyl. Tracks 1 and 3 would later appear on the compilation of the same name in 1993.

== Track list ==
Side G
| No. | Title | Length |
|---|---|---|
| 1. | "Young Black Brotha" | 5:42 |
| 2. | "Livin' a Mac's Life" | 4:57 |
| 3. | "Too Hard for the Fuckin' Radio (Radio Version)" (Only on LP version) | 4:39 |
| Total length: | | 15:18 |

Side Q
| No. | Title | Length |
|---|---|---|
| 3. | "Too Hard for the Fuckin' Radio" (Presented on the vinyl as "Too Hard for da Fuckin' Radio") | 4:59 |
| 4. | "Mac Dre's the Name" | 5:13 |
| Total length: | | 10:13 |

As well as the four songs listed above, the LP jackets and cassette J-cards also mentioned a radio edit of "Mac Dre's the Name" at the end of side G and the instrumental track for "Young Black Brotha" at the end of side Q, although they were not present on the LP or MC.

When tracks 1 and 3 were included on the Young Black Brotha album in 1993, track 1 was shortened by 15 seconds and track 3 was retitled to "2 Hard 4 the Fuckin' Radio".

A completely different track named "Mac Dre's the Name" was used as the title track for the album of the same name in 2001.
