= J-Diggs =

American rapper

- J-Diggs 2014

Background information
- Born: Jamal Diggs; July 10, 1970 (age 56); Vallejo, California
- Genres: Hip hop, west coast hip hop, hyphy
- Occupations: Rapper, CEO
- Years active: 1995-present
- Labels: Thizz Entertainment, Thizz Nation

Jamal Diggs (born July 10, 1970), better known by his stage name J-Diggs, also Jay Digs or J-Diggs tha Rockstar, is an American rapper from Vallejo, CA. He is best known for his affiliation with fellow Vallejo rapper Mac Dre and his label, Thizz Entertainment.

== Legal issues ==
On September 14, 2012, J-Diggs and three other Thizz Entertainment members were arrested for assault and attempted murder in Hawaii.

On June 9, 2013, Washington County Sheriff’s Office arrested Jamal Diggs on a felony warrant out of Hawaii, and for drug and drug-related charges.

May 2020, arrested with his girlfriend in Rogers County Oklahoma with 4 pounds of cannabis and $12,000. Medical marijuana is legal in Oklahoma but not that quantity.

== Controversy ==
In 2005, he was involved in a feud with rapper J-Kwon.

In February 2011, J-Diggs released a diss track at ex-Funk Mobb member Mac Shawn called "Rat Shawn".

== Collaborations ==
=== 2014: Really Not a Rapper ===
In October 2014, J-Diggs presented Really Not a Rapper, the debut album from Bakersfield, California rapper Pezzy Montana, through City Hall Records and T-Team Records.
