= PSD (rapper) =

American rapper (1974–2026)

PSD tha Drivah
- Also known as: PSD, Stevie Dee
- Born: Steve Noel Davison; December 20, 1974; Picayune, Mississippi, U.S.
- Origin: Vallejo, California, U.S.
- Died: April 1, 2026 (aged 51)
- Genre: Hip hop
- Occupations: Rapper; songwriter; record producer
- Years active: 1996–2014
- Labels: Swerve, Gateway, Lightyear

Steven Noel Davison (December 20, 1974 – April 1, 2026), better known as PSD, PSD Tha Drivah or Stevie Dee, was an American rapper and producer from Vallejo, California, who was closely associated with the late Mac Dre.

== Background ==
Steven Noel Davison was born in Picayune, Mississippi on December 20, 1974, to Johnny and Janice Davison. He was the youngest child, and grew up attending church. Davison was seriously injured in a traffic collision in 2025. He died from a lung infection on April 1, 2026, at the age of 51.

== Career ==
PSD tha Drivah first appeared on Mac Dre's 1996 compilation album ‘The Rompalation’, appearing on the track "Menage A Trois" and "Ghetto World", and producing the stand-out tracks "Uninvited" and "Gumbo". After that, he would appear on N2Deep's 1997 album ‘The Golden State’ and release his debut album ‘Game Costs’ that same year. PSD tha Drivah would later release several more albums: ‘Bread Head' as well as 'What It Is’ in 1999, 2002's ‘All I Want’, 2003's ‘You Ain't Heard of Me?’, and 2005's ‘The Guru’ and ‘PSD Classic’ before finally making it to the Billboard charts with 2007's ‘Da Bidness’, which was released with Messy Marv and Keak da Sneak.

PSD tha Drivah has roots from both Vallejo’s Crest Side neighborhood, as well as Mississippi. The rapper is known for his smooth harmonious voice and being a 'playa.' PSD tha Drivah has put out numerous mixtapes with DJ Ambush, called ‘Mixes And Renditions’. PSD tha Drivah is also known as "Playa Stevie Dee", PSD or "Tha Drivah" for his swagger and his excellent driving skills. PSD was close friends with Mac Dre; they formed a rap group called the Cutthroat Committee which also includes rapper Dubee. The group went on to record two albums ‘Turf Buccaneers’ and ‘Money Iz Motive’. The group disbanded due to the untimely death of Mac Dre.

His latest mixtape, entitled ‘The Risk and the Reward II’ features late rapper and friend, The Jacka, in ‘Know No Better’ and ‘Who Are You?’. PSD tha Drivah has worked with many other artists throughout the Bay Area. He has said in interviews that rapper San Quinn is like family to him.

== Arrests ==
On July 14, 2008, PSD tha Drivah was arrested at Sacramento International Airport while trying to board an Express Jet flight. Transportation Security Administration (TSA) screeners picked Davison out for pre-screening as he went through the airport security checkpoint, authorities said. As screeners patted Davison down, they felt "a large bulge through his pants inside his inner right leg," according to a U.S. Attorney news release. Davison allegedly told the screeners the bulge was a colostomy bag and tried to leave the screening area. Davison had 1,000 ecstasy pills in his pants and $5,600.00 in $100.00 bills his front left pocket. A TSP screener later found 5000 more of the pills in a room where Davison had been briefly left unattended before the search. Davison was arrested. According to the Judgment filed with the court in the United States District Court for the Eastern District of California, criminal case No.: 2:08CR00350-01, Davison was convicted through a plea deal of one felony count of Possession with intent to Distribute MDMA a class C felony. He was sentenced to 46 months in prison and was on supervised release for 36 months thereafter.

== Discography ==
=== Studio albums ===
- Game Costs (1997)
- Bread Head (1999)
- What It Is (1999)
- All I Want (2002)
- You Ain't Heard of Me? (2003)
- The Guru (2005)
- PSD Classic (2005)
- Bullets & Bouquets (2012)

=== Collaboration albums ===
- Turf Buccaneers with Cutthroat Committee (2001)
- Money Iz Motive with Cutthroat Committee (2005)
- Da Bidness with Messy Marv & Keak Da Sneak (2007)
- Da Bidness Part II with Messy Marv & Keak Da Sneak (2010)

=== Mixtapes ===
- Mixes and Renditions Vol.1 (2004)
- Mixes and Renditions Vol.2 (2005)
- Mixes and Renditions Vol.3 (2005)
- The Eight Wait (2007)
- A Star Iz Born (2009)
- The Risk & Reward (2012)
- The Risk & Reward 2 (Cool Is In) (2014)

=== Guest appearances ===
- 1995 Ironic - De Vallejo, ‘Now What You Wanna Do’
- 1997 Jay Tee & Baby Beesh - Latino Velvet, ‘Threesome’
- 1998 Young Flav - Catch Me If You Can ‘I Keep It Coming’
- 1999 O.Z. – Ozone, ‘Iceburg’
- 1999 Mac Dre - Rapper Gone Bad, ‘Fortytwo Fake’
- 2000 Quai' Badd - Expedition
- 2000 II Manish – Anything Goez, ‘Manish’
- 2000 II Manish - Rookie Season, ‘Lights’
- 2001 Sleep Dank - Murder Book Author, ‘Talk Big Shit’
- 2001 Mac Dre - Mac Dre's The Name, ‘Neva Gonna Fade Us’
- 2001 San Quinn - The Mighty Quinn, ‘I Love This Game’
- 2001 Don Cisco - Oh Boy, ‘Talk That Talk’
- 2001 Mac Dre - It's Not What You Say... It's How You Say It, ‘Mac Dammit And Friends’
- 2002 N2DEEP - Slightly Pimpish / Mostly Doggish, ‘Act A Fool’
- 2002 BC - Cali Green, ‘M.V.P.'s To The 3C's’
- 2002 N2Deep - 24-7-365, ‘Small Town’
- 2002 Richie Rich - Nixon Pryor Roundtree, ‘No Degreez’
- 2002 Mac Dre - Thizzelle Washington, ‘C.U.T./T.H.O.A.T.’
- 2002 San Francisco Giants - Sprinkled Heavy On The Mac Sauce, ‘Califooya’
- 2002 Latino Velvet – Clique, ‘Threesome’
- 2002 Mac Dre, Da Unda Dogg - Present The Rompalation 3, ‘Do What We Believe’
- 2003 Natural Born Dankstas - Collectors Item, ‘Fuck Somebody’
- 2003 Mac Dre - Heart Of Gangsta, Mind Of A Hustler, Tongue Of A Pimp, ‘Hy Phy’
- 2003 J-Diggs - Both Sides Of The Gate, ‘My World’
- 2003 Rydah J. Klyde - Tha Fly Gangsta, ‘50 Shotz’
- 2003 Dubee - Turf Matic, ‘It Don't Stop’
- 2004 Tay Diggs – Underworld, ‘That's My Word’
- 2004 Krypto – Controversy, ‘Frozen’
- 2004 The Delinquents - Have Money Have Heart, ‘Where Ya At’
- 2004 Potna Deuce - Tha Uncut Heron Soup Goop, ‘Playaz Night’
- 2004 Polo & Curcinado – Acid, ‘Fuck Wit It’
- 2004 Mac Dre - The Game Is Thick Part 2, ‘Hotta Den Steam’
- 2005 BeBop - History In The Making, ‘To Whom It May Concern’
- 2005 Sean T - Ain't Playin', ‘Down Ass Bitch’
- 2005 E.B. Daddy Of Da Hood - Hood Rebel, ‘What You Rappin' For?’
- 2005 The Crest Creepaz - The Thizzics Room, ‘Crest Creep Low’
- 2005 Money Gang - Bang Fo Bread, ‘One, Two Thang’
- 2005 Rydah J. Klyde - What's Really Thizzin'?, ‘Bottom’
- 2005 Mac Dre & Mac Mall - Da U.S. Open, ‘The Nation Of Thizzlam’
- 2005 Mistah F.A.B. - Son Of A Pimp, ‘Streets Of The Bay’
- 2006 Keak Da Sneak - Thizz Iz AllNDaDoeDa', ‘Coolio Who Started Hyphy’
- 2006 The Dragons - Rapademics 101, ‘I'm A Fool’
- 2007 Rydah J. Klyde - Thizz Nation Vol. 9, ‘Blow Yo' Mind’
- 2007 Da Unda Dogg - Rap Star, ‘KC 2 Da Crest’
- 2007 Bavgate - The King Of Oakland, ‘Bosses’
- 2007 Mac Dre & Jay Tee - Everybody Ain't Able, ‘Act A Fool’
- 2007 Money Gang - Thizz Nation Vol. 12, ‘1, 2 Thang’
- 2007 Young C-Major - Ice Cold Frio, ‘Ice Cold’
- 2007 J-Diggs "Da Rockstar" - Thizz Nation Vol. 17, ‘Fool’
- 2008 40 Kal - Escobar Pitch, ‘M.O.N.E.Y.’
- 2008 San Quinn - From A Boy To A Man, ‘Reinforced Steel’
- 2008 Skiem - Bacc On Tha Briccs, ‘Need My Cheese’
- 2008 Gorilla Pits - Thizz Nation Vol. 21. ‘Scrapin' (Remix)’
- 2008 Husalah & B-Luv - The Tonka Boyz, ‘Bitch Dat's B-Luv’
- 2008 Dubee A.k.a. Sugawolf - Last Of A Thizzin' Breed, ‘I'm A Gangsta’
- 2008 Boszy - A Walkin' Contradiction, ‘Hustlaz Bluz’
- 2008 Lil Coner - Hogg Status, ‘A Nation’
- 2008 Young Haitti - Kryphy Music, ‘Chop It Up Like’
- 2009 J-Diggs - Da Good..., ‘God Bless’
- 2009 J-Diggs - JDiggs.com, ‘Circumstances & Consequences’
- 2012 Krypto - Rare Breed, ‘Somethin' Heavy’
- 2014 The Mekanix - Chop Shop 2, ‘Get It Done’
