= Dubee =

American rapper

Major Norton, better known by his stage name Dubee, is an American rapper.

== Biography ==
A longtime player in the Northern California Bay Area rap scene, he is a former player of the City College of San Francisco's football team, where he was a running back and ranks 4th in the college's all-time single season rushing yards list and 8th in the all-time career rushing yards category.

Dubee signed his first deal with local producer Khayree Shaheed's Young Black Brotha Records in 1995 and released an album titled Dubee AKA Sugawolf (known as just Dubee at the time) on the imprint through Atlantic Records. He has been a long collaborator with performers from Northern California (such as label mates Ray Luv and Young Lay) and beyond.

== Discography ==
=== Studio albums ===
- Dubee a.k.a. Sugawolf (1995)
- For That Scrilla (1997)
- Dangerous Prospects (1999)
- 100% G-Shit (2001)
- Turf Matic (2003)
- Why Change Now? (2005)
- Last Of A Thizzin' Breed (2008)
- Thizzmatic (2008)
- Da "T" (2009)
- Tha Furly Ghost (Volume 2) (2010)
- Crest Side Radio (2012)
- Major Movin’ (Live From The Inside) (2015)
- Real Before Rap (2020)

=== Collaboration albums ===
- Turf Buccaneers (with Cutthroat Committee) (2001)
- Money Iz Motive (with Cutthroat Committee) (2005)
- Thizzpire Strikes Back (with Mac Mall & Sleep Dank & Tic) (2013)
- Cutthroat (with DB Tha General) (2023)

=== Compilation albums ===
- Best Of Sugawolf Pimp (2007)

=== Extended plays ===
- Free (with Little Bruce) (2014)
