= Mac Dre =

American rapper and record producer (1970–2004)

- Hicks in 1996

Background information
- Born: Andre Louis Hicks; July 5, 1970; Oakland, California, U.S.
- Origin: Vallejo, California, U.S.
- Died: November 1, 2004 (aged 34) Kansas City, Missouri, U.S.
- Cause of death: Assassination (gunshot wound)
- Genres: West Coast hip-hop; gangsta rap; hyphy
- Occupations: Rapper; songwriter; record producer
- Works: Mac Dre discography
- Years active: 1984–2004
- Label: Thizz
- Website: legendofthebay.com

Andre Louis Hicks (July 5, 1970 – November 1, 2004), known professionally as Mac Dre, also known as "Furl" was an American rapper, songwriter, and record producer from Vallejo, California. He was an instrumental figure in the emergence of hyphy, a cultural movement in the Bay Area hip-hop scene that emerged in the early 2000s. Hicks is considered one of the movement's key pioneers that fueled its popularity into mainstream, releasing songs with fast-paced rhymes and basslines that inspired a new style of dance. As the founder of the independent record label Thizz Entertainment, Hicks recorded dozens of albums and gave aspiring rappers an outlet to release albums locally.

On November 1, 2004, Hicks was shot and killed by an unknown assailant after a performance in Kansas City, Missouri, a case that remains unsolved.

== Early life and career ==
Andre Louis Hicks was born in Oakland, California on July 5, 1970, to Allen Hicks and Wanda Salvatto. They then lived in Marin and later moved to Vallejo, California. He would often frequent and claim the Country Club Crest neighborhood, known locally as The Crest, despite never having lived there himself. In 1989, the outgoing Hicks made waves with a cassette tape featuring the single, "Too Hard for the F—in' Radio" while still a student at Vallejo's Hogan High School. In 2013, NPR noted his sound as being "fast and confident" further writing that "he built upon the bouncy bass that had its roots in the funk era." When asked about his childhood, Hicks stated that "Situations came out for the better most of them, I went through the little trials and the shit that I went through." Hicks first adopted the stage name MC Dre in 1984, but altered it to Mac Dre the following year because he considered that the name sounded "too East Coast-ish". Hicks recorded his first three extended play (EP) recordings as Mac Dre between 1988 and 1992.

In 1992, Mac Dre recorded Back n da Hood over the phone while incarcerated in Fresno County Jail and Lompoc Prison. In 2024, Rolling Stone Australia/New Zealand stated, "The audacity of someone making records while incarcerated made national headlines and burnished the Mac Dre legend." While incarcerated, Mac Dre’s debut LP Young Black Brotha was released in 1993; produced by Khayree, it became his most commercially successful project and solidified his presence within Bay Area rap.

After his release from Lompoc Prison in 1996, Mac Dre started Romp Records which served as a platform for Mac Dre and other Bay Area artists to release music, The label also released compilations like Mac Dre Presents the Rompalation.

Mac Dre’s first solo album after his release from prison, Stupid Doo Doo Dumb, was released on April 28, 1998, and debuted at No.18 on the Heatseekers Albums chart. He then followed it with Rapper Gone Bad in 1999, which was the final album released on Romp Records.

Mac Dre moved to the Arden-Arcade area of Sacramento in 1998 in attempt to distance himself from Vallejo law enforcement. There, he founded his independent label Thizz Entertainment, which is currently managed by his mother Wanda Salvatto. In the early 2000s, Dre's change in sound became influential in the hyphy movement.

== Legal issues ==
The city of Vallejo began experiencing a surge in bank robberies in the early 1990s. Vallejo police began focusing on the Crest neighborhood as a source of the crime. Hicks was vocal about the actions he saw being taken by the police and incorporated their aggressive surveillance of residents into his music. Hicks claimed he was rapping about attempts to "wake up the neighbors." As gangsta rap consistently grew in popularity, law enforcement officials began examining the lyrics of local rappers to utilize as evidence in criminal matters.

On March 26, 1992, at age 21, Hicks was invited by friends on a road trip to Fresno. Hicks had performed in that city two weeks prior and decided to go on the trip so that he could re-visit a woman he knew there. While driving back to Vallejo, the car was surrounded by FBI agents and Fresno and Vallejo police officers. The police said that while Hicks was at a motel, his friends were allegedly casing a bank but had changed their mind when they saw a local Fresno TV News van in the bank's parking lot. When questioned by the police, Hicks said that he didn't leave the hotel, therefore did not know anything. The police subsequently charged him with conspiracy to commit robbery, although Hicks was not with his friends at the time.

After he refused a plea deal for the conspiracy charge, he was tried, convicted, and sentenced to five years in federal prison. The conviction hinged on a gun linked to the bank robberies found in his apartment months before his arrest, and a recording where he was heard to say "Shoot out the surveillance cameras". The trial was listed among Complex's 30 Biggest Criminal Trials in Rap History. At the time of his conviction, Hicks owned the record label Romp Productions. Hicks was released a year early from prison for good behavior on August 2, 1996, after serving four years. It was during his time in prison that Hicks developed a "better appreciation for freedom, life, fun" as well as coordinating to release a compilation record on his newly-formed label.

== Death ==
After Hicks and other Thizz Entertainment members had performed a show in Kansas City, Missouri, on October 31, 2004, an unidentified gunman shot at the group's van as it traveled on U.S. Route 71 in the early morning hours of November 1. The van's driver crashed and called 911, but Hicks was pronounced dead at the scene from a bullet wound to the neck. Local rapper Anthony "Fat Tone" Watkins was alleged to have been responsible for the murder, but no evidence ever surfaced, and Watkins himself was shot dead the following year.

Hicks' funeral took place on November 9, 2004, at the Mt. Calvary Baptist Church. He was given a public open-casket viewing, and then buried at the Mountain View Cemetery in Oakland.

== Legacy ==
Many Bay Area artists have credited Mac Dre as one of the areas most influential artists. Various mainstream artists, including Drake, Kendrick Lamar, G-Eazy, and Snoop Dogg, have also paid tribute to Mac Dre and acknowledged his influence on 2000s rap. Atlanta rapper and producer Lil Jon, with Salvatto's blessing, incorporated Dre's vocals into his 2019 single "Ain't No Tellin". In 2023, Stephen Curry & Marshawn Lynch announced an upcoming documentary on the life and music of Mac Dre.

== Discography ==
=== Studio albums ===
- Young Black Brotha (1993)
- Stupid Doo Doo Dumb (1998)
- Rapper Gone Bad (1999)
- Heart of a Gangsta, Mind of a Hustla, Tongue of a Pimp (2000)
- Mac Dre's the Name (2001)
- It's Not What You Say... It's How You Say It (2001)
- Thizzelle Washington (2002)
- Al Boo Boo (2003)
- Ronald Dregan: Dreganomics (2004)
- The Genie of the Lamp (2004)
- The Game Is Thick, Vol. 2 (2004)

=== Posthumous studio albums ===
- Pill Clinton (2007)
- Dre Day: July 5th 1970 (2008)

=== Collaboration albums ===
- Turf Buccaneers with Cutthoat Committee (2001)
- Supa Sig Tapes with Little Bruce (2003)
- Money iz Motive with Cutthoat Committee (2005)
- Da U.S. Open with Mac Mall (2005)
- A Tale of 2 Andres with Andre Nickatina (2008)

=== Extended plays ===
- Young Black Brotha (1989)
- California Livin' (1991)
- What's Really Going On (1992)
- Back n da Hood (1992)

== See also ==
- List of murdered hip hop musicians
- List of unsolved murders (2000–present)
