= Thizz Entertainment =

- Founded: 1999
- Founder: Mac Dre
- Distributors: City Hall Records; RED Distribution
- Genre: West Coast hip hop; gangsta rap; hyphy
- Country of origin: United States
- Location: Vallejo, California, United States
- Official website: http://www.legendofthebay.com

Thizz Entertainment is a Sacramento-based, originally independent record label, started in 1999 by rapper and music producer Andre Hicks, who was professionally known as Mac Dre, a poster child of the hyphy movement that swept through the Bay Area in the early 2000s. The label was relocated to the San Francisco Bay Area shortly after his untimely death.

In 2004, Hicks was murdered by an unknown assailant while traveling after a performance in Kansas City, Missouri. Upon Hicks's death and at his written direction, his mother, Wanda Salvatto, (affectionally known as "Mac Wanda") became owner and CEO.

There are no artists signed to the label, and the company's primary focus is to manage Mac Dre's expansive music catalog of over 25 albums, preserve his legacy, and hold artistic events to honor his memory.

== Background ==
Mac Dre was a rapper, comedian, and artist. Recording verses through a phone while serving time for a robbery charge and bringing phrases like "thizz," "go dumb," and "ghost ride the whip" to the lexicon.

In 1999, Hicks had relocated to Sacramento and founded Thizz Entertainment.

== Music ==
=== 1999–2004 ===
From its creation, the label, has been fundamental in the growth and popularity of the Bay Area Hyphy movement. Mac Dre's most popular albums including, Ronald Dregan: Dreganomics, The Genie of the Lamp, Thizzelle Washington, Mac Dre's the Name, were released under the label and distributed locally in partnership with City Hall Records in San Rafael.

=== 2004–present ===
Dedicated to protecting the works and legacy of Mac Dre, the label does not sign recording artists. Rappers and musicians that were previously associated with Mac Dre and his labels, and are still active in music, continue to support the label's efforts by promoting the brand within their own endeavors, paying homage by adding a "Thizz" prefix to their own label or production company. However, outside of this small and exclusive group, "Many in the rap game attach themselves to the term “thizz” to make a name for themselves and ride Mac Dre's coattails" said Black Dog Bone, editor of Vallejo-based Murder Dog magazine, which chronicles the rap scene.

Unaware of how frequently rappers and others were self-associating themselves with the label, Thizz Entertainment was shocked to learn in April 2012, eight years after Hicks's death, that it was named by US Drug Enforcement agents in connection with the mass arrest of 25 individuals in Vallejo, Stockton, Fairfield, Oakland, Los Angeles, New York, and Oklahoma City. Several that were arrested had falsely purported publicly to be signed and/or otherwise a part of the label.

As of 2018, former Thizz Entertainment artists continue to support and assist Salvatto in curtailing flagrant misuse or misrepresentation of affiliation to the current label or Mac Dre's brand by unauthorized third parties.

== Annual events ==
Ten years after his death, his mother was still receiving an excess of requests, comments, letters from young people, with stories of how Mac Dre affected them or got them through tough times in their young lives. “I didn't realize how big his presence was in the Bay Area and actually across the United States” stated Salvatto. She wanted to give young artists a chance who may not otherwise have an opportunity to showcase their talent.

=== Dre Area: The Mac Dre Art Show ===
In 2015, the label began to host an annual Dre Area: The Mac Dre Art Show in Oakland. The event showcases art pieces by various artists nationwide that are inspired by Mac Dre's legacy.

=== Mac Dre Day ===
In 2018, the label held its 3rd annual Mac Dre Day in San Francisco at The Regency Ballroom on July 5, what would have been Mac Dre's 48th birthday. “One of the reasons it's important” for the event to happen “is that he had an impact on young people in the Bay Area,” said Mac Wanda, going by the name because “that's what the kids call me.” The event was hosted by rapper Mally Mall and San Francisco radio station KMEL's DJ Amen and featured performances by Tyga, Nef the Pharaoh, Mistah F.A.B., Philthy Rich, Coolio Da Unda Dogg, Baby Bash and more, including several known rappers from the bay area that Mac Dre would frequently collaborate with over the years. There has been no incidents of negative occurrence at the events with Salvatto stating that she thinks fans understand that the show's organizer is his mother.

== Other media ==
Thizz Entertainment created the DVD series Treal TV.

In 2014, veteran actor, Tray Chaney, best known on the popular HBO drama series, The Wire, announced that he has been selected to produce and star in two upcoming Mac Dre films in partnership with Thizz Entertainment.

Inspired by the rapper Drake after he spoke to Salvatto on how much Mac Dre impacted his life and career, in 2015, Thizz Entertainment released the documentary, Legend of the Bay, narrated by rapper and journalist Sway Calloway. The documentary details the Bay Area legend's life and includes never-before-seen concert footage, home movies, exclusive interviews with Mac Dre's friends, family, and music artists such as Wiz Khalifa, Tech N9ne, and Warren G.
