= Cellski =

American rapper

- Also known as: Young Cellski; 2Took; Break-a-B***h; Big Mafi; Coach Cellichick; Mr. Predictor
- Born: Marcel Wade; August 26, 1975 (age 50); San Francisco, California
- Genres: Hip hop, west coast hip hop, hyphy, Mobb Music
- Occupations: Rapper, Hip hop Record producer, CEO
- Years active: 1992-present
- Labels: Inner City2K Records, Inner City Records, Thizz Nation

Marcel Wade (born August 26, 1975), better known by his stage name Cellski, is an American rapper/records producer from San Francisco. He is also the CEO of his label, Inner City2K Records.

Cellski has cited Too Short as his main influence as a rapper.

== Early life ==
Cellski grew up on Randolph St. in the Oceanview, locally known as "Lakeview", neighborhood of San Francisco. At the time, the area had a high crime rate.

== Music career ==
In the late 1980s, when Cellski was 13 or 14, he began working with Oakland producer Al Eaton, at the same studio where Too Short was recording his debut best-selling album Life Is...Too Short. Wade began his career selling tapes from the trunk of his car in 1992. He sold 1,000 tapes that year, earning six thousand dollars, which he realized was preferential to illegal forms of money making.

As of 2023, Cellski still performs at Bay Area events.

== Business ventures ==
In 2012, Cellski started a streetwear clothing line called Chemical Baby; the name was inspired by the toxic dirt and water found in his community. In October 2022, inspired by his mother and grandmother's cooking, Cellski started a culinary popup called Big Mafi Burger. He also has an equity cannabis license with 2Took Farms, distributing Cookies, Berner's product.

== Discography ==
=== Studio albums ===
- Mr. Predicter (1995)
- Canadian Bacon and Hash Browns (1999)
- Mafia Moves (2001)
- Mr. Predicter Chapter 2 (2006)
- Chef Boy Cellski's Culinary Arts Institution (2009)
- Big Mafi The Don (2011)
- Chemical Baby (2015)
- Legendary (2018)
- The Candlestick Kid (2025)

=== Collaboration albums ===
- Little Big & Big Mafi with Killa Keise (2003)

=== Compilation albums ===
- The Collection (2000)
- The Collection Part 2 (2003)

=== Mixtapes ===
- Freestyle Mixtape Vol. 1: Me & My Niggs (2001)
- Freestyle Mixtape Vol. 2: Outta Da Dome (2002)
- Freestyle Mixtape Vol. 3: Its Not a Game with Killa Keise (2003)
- Freestyle Mixtape Vol. 5: What Is It, Mayne?! with Killa Keise (2003)
- Freestyle Mixtape Vol. 6: Stunna-Vision (2004)
- Freestyle Mixtape Vol. 7: Coach Cellichick (2009)

=== Extended plays ===
- Inner City Life - The Lost EP (1992)
- Living In the Bay (1992)

=== Guest appearances ===
Year	Song	Artist(s)	Album
1993	"Frisco"	I.M.P., Cougnut, C-Fresh, Andre Nickatina, Chewy-C	Back In the Days
1996	"Why You Wanna"	Primo	Stickin' to the Script
1996	"Fo the Real (Intro)"	Young Ed	Time to Stack
1996	"Come See Me"	Young Ed	Time to Stack
1997	"I Spit Game"	The Pacific Division, Menace Man, Dino Blaque, Raw Faw, e Sic, E. Caine	187-303 Is the Code
1997	"Free Loaders"	The Pacific Division, Hennessey, Regal, Killa Keise, Raw Faw, RJ	187-303 Is the Code
1999	"Hard on Hoes"	Herm, Ray Luv	Trying to Survive in the Ghetto 2000
2001	"Livin' Life"	Ballin' A$$ Dame, Luni Coleone	Get Rich Quick Schemes
2002	"Thugz Ride"	II Sicc, Mr. Kee, Main 1	Talez from the Sicc
2003	"Get Flipped"	Laroo T.H.H., Killa Keise, Messy Marv	Trash-N-Treasure
2003	"Frisco Legends"	Taydatay, Black C, JT the Bigga Figga, Big Mack	Out of Sight, On the Grind
2003	"Head"	Baldhead Rick	Thug Continent
2003	"We Some Playaz"	Baldhead Rick	Thug Continent
2004	"Black Mafia Life"	Guce, Killa Tay	Bullys Wit Fullys 2: Gangsta Without the Rap
2005	"Bounce, Shake, Wiggle"	Killa Keise	Turfed Out
2005	"Hatin' On Me"	Killa Keise	Turfed Out
2005	"Lately"	Mob Figaz, The Jacka	Animal Planet
2005	"21 Gun Salute"	King Medallions	Jewelry Box Sessions, Pt. 1
2006	"Big Bucks"	Tha Gamblaz, Goodfelonz	Highly Flammable
2006	"Lookin At Booty"	Keak da Sneak	Kunta Kinte
2006	"Let Them Have It"	Miami	Miami and the Nation of Thizzlam
2006	"Boss"	San Quinn, Killa Keise	4.5.7. Is the Code, Pt. 3
2006	"We Gone Scrape"	Equipto, Shag Nasty	Behind the Rhyme
2006	"48 Bars Runnin'"	Killa Squad	The 5th Element
2007	"Now Ya Know"	Cam City, Killa Squad	a.k.a. Baby New York
2008	"Look Up"	Berner, The Jacka	Drought Season
2008	"20 Bricks" (Remix)	Laroo T.H.H., B-Legit, Big Rich, The Jacka, Dem Hoodstarz, E-40, Harm, Killa Tay, Eddie P	The Cooperation
2008	"SF Anthem"	Boo Banga, San Quinn, Black C, All City, Willie Hen	All City
2008	"Not Me"	The Jacka	The Street Album
2009	"So Fly"	DJ Kush, The Yayboyz, The Jacka, Trill Real	Go Purp, Vol. 2
2009	"Won't Be Right"	The Jacka	Tear Gas
2009	"Tell Me"	Lee Majors	Muzik 4 the Mob
2009	"Sheymago" (Remix)	Reek Daddy, Mr. Skrillz, Mac Dre, Mistah F.A.B., JT the Bigga Figga, Boss Hogg, J-Diggs, The Jacka, Rydah J. Klyde, Lee Majors, San Quinn	Sacto 2 Da Crest
2009	"Circles"	Berner, The Jacka	Drought Season 2
2010	"Cocaine"	The Jacka, Lee Majors, Husalah, Messy Marv, Fed-X, Yukmouth, G-Stack, Rahmean	The Gobots 2: D-Boy Era
2010	"Seaside"	J-Blaze	The Great Regression
2010	"Sumthin About Mary"	Reggie Swooop, Ruthless Rebel, Elusion	Tha Reggie Swooop
2010	"Street Ballin' 2"	J-Diggs, Rich the Factor	Street Ballin' 2
2011	"Rep That Mob S**t"	Messy Marv, The Jacka	Paper Bag Money
2011	"Nothin' Like my Squad"	AP9	Relentless
2011	"My Money"	Joe Blow, The Jacka, Netta Brielle, Lee Majors	You Should Be Payin' Me
2011	"Trapped"	Lee Majors	D-Boy Muzik
2011	"Pies In the Kitchen"	Lee Majors	D-Boy Muzik
2011	"Let the Song Cry"	Joe Blow	International Blow: The Fixtape
2012	"They Need That Mob S**t"	The Jacka	The Verdict
2012	"With the S**t"	E-40, JT the Bigga Figga	The Block Brochure: Welcome to the Soil 2
2012	"Cookies & Bo"	Yukmouth, B-Legit	Half Baked
2012	"F*** You Pay Me"	Lee Majors, Matt Blaque, Joe Blow	What Mobstaz Do
2012	"Get It How U Live"	Rhino & B.	Street Chemists
2012	"Ridin' Thru the Hood"	Joe Blow, Lee Majors	Real Recognize Real
2012	"Drugs Guns Funds"	Mac Mall, San Quinn	DLK Collabs, Vol. 1
2013	"Tweakers"	Joe Blow, Husalah, J Blakk	Been Grindin'
2013	"Got My Cash On"	Lee Majors	Turkey Bags In My Louie Duffle
2013	"I Smoke"	JC, Berner	A Shade of Purp
2013	"Round Tables"	Ampichino, Lil Rue, L.I.S., Dreper, Luchi	Da Krazies 2: Fear Thy Neighbor
2013	"Code of the Mob"	Joe Blow, Husalah, Bo Strangles	Check a Real N***a Out Tho
2013	"Runnin' Game"	Rhino, TC Kapone	The Plug
2013	"I'm On"	Dubb 20, Street Knowledge	Ya Favorite Number
2013	"Light It Up"	Lee Majors, Yukmouth	Turkey Bag Boy
2013	"Move Weight"	Lee Majors, Lil Rue	Turkey Bag Boy
2013	"Everybody"	ABM, Lee Majors, The Jacka	Connected & Respected
2013	"AC/DC"	ROC, Lee Majors	Rolling Stoned
2014	"Think About It"	Joe Blow, Yukmouth, Husalah	True Story
2014	"Wrong"	A-Wax	WaxFase
2015	"On My Grind"	Joe Blow, E. Dubb	Blow 2
2015	"RIP"	Nah'Liyah, Fed-X	Check a Real Girl Out Tho & The Realist Out
2015	"Patron"	ill Logik, 11/5, E-SIC	The Illness
2015	"Chemical Babies"	Lil AJ	Lash Money
2016	"Passion 4 Guap"	Joe Blow	M.O.B. 2 (The Real Mob)
