= Devilz Rejects 2: House of the Dead =

Devil Rejectz 2: House of the Dead

Studio album by Ampichino & The Jacka
- Released: October 19, 2010
- Genre: Hip hop
- Length: 1:18:57
- Label: Double F Records
- Producer: Bannon; Dexbeats; Golden I-95; Joe Mill

Ampichino & The Jacka chronology
Drought Season 2 (2009)	Devil Rejectz 2: House of the Dead (2010)	Flight Risk (2011)

Devil Rejectz 2: House of the Dead is a collaboration album between American rappers Ampichino and The Jacka. It peaked at #83 on the R&B/Hip-Hop Albums chart. Devil Rejectz 2: House of the Dead includes guest appearances from T-Nutty, Yukmouth, Mistah F.A.B., Berner and Rydah J. Klyde, amongst other artists.

A music video has been filmed for the song "Hustle In the Rain" featuring Husalah & T-Nutty.

== Track listing ==
#	Title	length
1	Dope Game (featuring Dubb 20)	4:24
2	Hustle in the Rain (featuring Husalah & T-Nutty)	4:48
3	No Tears	3:17
4	Same World	4:37
5	Pain (featuring Boi Big, Rich the Factor & Fed-X)	4:32
6	Death 2 My Enemies (featuring Lil Rue, Livewire & Husalah)	4:49
7	Not an Option (featuring Berner & Joe Blow)	4:43
8	Interlude	0:29
9	House of the Dead (featuring Yukmouth)	5:02
10	Convo	3:07
11	Born 2 Lose	4:25
12	Real Ninja Shhh (featuring Rydah J. Klyde)	4:15
13	Interlude	0:16
14	911 (featuring Taisha Latrell'e)	4:33
15	Bonafide Hustler (featuring Mr. Fab & Smiggz)	4:15
16	Bullet Proof Soul (featuring Young Bossi & Ren Fetti)	3:57
17	Dope Fiend Music (featuring Lee Majors)	4:21
18	I Shot U Down (featuring Smiggz & Fed-X)	4:01
19	On Everythang (featuring Joe Blow)	5:06
20	Death Is Fatal (featuring AP.9)	4:00
