= Cookies 'n Cream (album) =

Studio album by Blanco & Yukmouth
- Released: July 10, 2012
- Recorded: 2012
- Genre: Hip hop
- Length: 32:11
- Label: Guerrilla Entertainment, Smoke-a-Lot Records
- Producer: Blanco & Yukmouth (exec.)

Blanco chronology
Raw (2012)	Cookies 'n Cream (2012)	Obey (2012)

Yukmouth chronology
Half Baked (2012)	Cookies 'n Cream (2012)	The ReGime: The Last Dragon (2013)

Professional ratings
Review scores
Source	Rating
RapReviews	6.5/10 stars

Cookies 'n Cream is a collaborative studio album by American rappers Blanco and Yukmouth, released July 10, 2012 on Guerrilla/Smoke-a-Lot Records.

== Track listing ==
No.	Title	Producer(s)	Length
1.	"Airheads" (featuring Dru Down, B-Legit & Richie Rich)	Cookin' Soul	8:05
2.	"Warheads" (featuring Mistah F.A.B. & Phil Da Agony)	Cookin' Soul	5:01
3.	"Hot Tamales" (featuring Krondon & Mitchy Slick)	Cookin' Soul	3:59
4.	"Rocky Road" (featuring The Jacka)	Cookin' Soul	2:48
5.	"Whoppers" (featuring Stevie Joe & The Jacka)	Cookin' Soul	4:03
6.	"Pay Day" (featuring Ampichino)	Cookin' Soul	4:19
7.	"Pop Rocks" (featuring Lee Majors & Lil Rue)	Cookin' Soul	3:56
