= Obey =

Obey may refer to:

- Obedience, the act of following instructions or recognizing authority

== Music ==
- Obey (Blanco and The Jacka album), 2012
- Obey, an album by Axis of Advance, 2004
- Obey, an album by Benedictum, 2013
- Obey, an album by Brainbombs, 1995
- "Obey" (Bring Me the Horizon and Yungblud song), 2020
- "Obey", a song by Alien Faktor from Desolate, 1995
- "Obey", a song by Upon This Dawning, 2014

== Other uses ==
- Obey (clothing), a fashion line by Shepard Fairey
- Obey (surname), a list of people with the name
- Obey Chimuka, Zimbabwean businessman
- Obey River, a tributary of the Cumberland River in Tennessee, U.S.

== See also ==
- Obedience (disambiguation)
