= Highway Robbery (Freeway and The Jacka album) =

2014 album by Freeway and The Jacka

Studio album by Freeway and The Jacka
- Released: September 16, 2014
- Recorded: 2006–2012
- Genre: Hip hop
- Label: Team Early Ent.; The Artist Records

Freeway and The Jacka chronology
Write My Wrongs (2012)	Highway Robbery (2014)

The Jacka chronology
Never Be The Same: Season 2 (with Laroo) (2013)	Highway Robbery (2014)	Risk Game (with M Dot 80) (2014)

Freeway chronology
Broken Ankles (with Girl Talk) (2014)	Highway Robbery (2014)	Fear of a Free Planet (2016)

Write My Wrongs

Mixtape by Freeway and The Jacka
- Released: October 14, 2013
- Recorded: 2006–2012
- Genre: Hip hop
- Label: Team Early Ent.; The Artist Records

Highway Robbery is a 2014 collaborative album by rappers Freeway of State Property and The Jacka of the Mob Figaz. It was released on September 16, 2014. The album was preceded by a mixtape entitled Write My Wrongs, released on October 14, 2013, which served as a prequel to the album.

== Background ==
On September 10, 2013, the pair released a music video for the track "Combine The Coasts" from their upcoming mixtape Write My Wrongs. The release was in anticipation for their album Highway Robbery announced for a November release, to be preceded by their mixtape release in October. Guest appearances announced for the project included Freddie Gibbs, Paul Wall, Cormega, Trae Tha Truth, Ampichino and Mob Figaz members Husalah and Rydah J Klyde On September 17, the cover and tracklist were revealed for Highway Robbery. The album was slated for a November 12 release.

The pair had previously collaborated on the tracks "They Don't Know" on Tear Gas (2009), "Real Hood" on Gobots 2: D-Boy Era (2010), "Both Coasts" on The Indictment (2011), "All Kinds of Em" on StatikFree (2011), "Freedom Writers" on The Sentence (2012), and "So Many Animals" on The A.R. Street Album (2012). The first of which having been recorded when the two first met in "like 2002 or 2003" when the Jacka reached out to Freeway who was visiting the Bay Area at the time. The Jacka revealed to Vibe, the bulk of their music had been recorded as far back as 2006 and 2008. "We’ve recorded so much material together that we had to do something with all these songs."

Their mixtape Write My Wrongs was released on October 14. The mixtape was intended to convey tracks that had not made it on to the album and sneak peaks into the upcoming release. Their aforementioned collaborations also appeared on the mixtape, including remixed versions of "Real Hood" and "So Many Animals" on new production. The mixtape was mixed and hosted by DJ Child. Freeway and The Jacka launched the "Highway Robbery" tour in late 2014 which was cut short due to the untimely death of The Jacka in February 2015. The duo performed at The Crocodile in Seattle/Washington in September 2014 with Remy R.E.D as guest Dj. And at Karribbean City in Oaklsnd/California with Dj Quest Live.

== Reception ==
Highway Robbery received positive reviews from music critics. Jayson Greene of Pitchfork, referring to the album, stated "the bulk of the music is low-key, liquid, and unmistakably bluesy. The guests that float through are on the same wavelength." Greene praised Freeway's return to form and his chemistry with the Jacka, stating "he sounds incredible; more importantly, he sounds palpably at home [...] and the Jacka is his most natural partner since Beanie Sigel." He rated the album 7.9 out of 10.

Will Chase of BlackGrooves.org praised the production "driven by The Jacka’s ear for a diverse range of beats. Familiar Bay Area names like Jeffro, Young L and Traxmillion lay bluesy, lush arrangements incorporating everything from soft synth pads to Middle Eastern percussion to Daft Punk" supplemented by a diverse guest list which drew upon acts from all over the country. Jeff Baird of PotHolesInMyBlog.com delivered a more mixed reception. "Freeway and Jacka have an innate ability to resonate with their listeners as they navigate that territory [documenting street life and struggle.] There’s a sense of authority gained when one has endured a similar struggle, and that powers much of the album" but criticized tracks such as "Shuckin & Jivin" and "Just Remain" as being "ill-advised, which drastically hamper the album’s built-up rhythm." He rated the album 3.5 out of 5.

== Track listing ==
=== Highway Robbery ===
No.	Title	Producer(s)	Length
1.	"Write My Wrongs" (featuring Cormega)	Jeffro
2.	"Dunya"	RobLo
3.	"No Time" (featuring Joe Blow)	Traxamillion
4.	"On My Toes" (featuring Dubb 20, Fam Syrk)	Jeffro
5.	"Cherry Pie" (featuring Freddie Gibbs & The Jynx)	Jeffro
6.	"One" (featuring Husalah, Paul Wall)	Young L
7.	"Just Remain" (featuring Trae Tha Truth)	Serg1
8.	"Gun Language" (featuring Blahk Jesus, Rydah J. Klyde)	Maki
9.	"Dying To Try Me" (featuring Ampichino)	Young L
10.	"One More Time"	Jeffro
11.	"Get Your Shine" (featuring London)	Jeffro
12.	"Sunnah Boys" (featuring Killer Mike)	Traxamillion
13.	"We Holdin"	Jake One; G Koop
14.	"Uh Huh"	Jeffro
15.	"Shuckin & Jivin" (featuring Husalah)	Young L

=== Write My Wrongs ===
No.	Title	Producer(s)	Length
1.	"Day Of Judgement (Intro)"
2.	"Write My Wrongs" (featuring Jahdan Blakkamoore)	Jeffro
3.	"Mega Man" (featuring Husalah)	Bedrock
4.	"They Don't Know Pt.1"	RobLo
5.	"Law 5 Interlude"
6.	"They Don't Know Pt.2"	RobLo
7.	"The Truth Interlude"
8.	"No Imagination"	DJ Toure
9.	"Born In The Struggle Interlude"
10.	"Both Coasts" (featuring Erk Tha Jerk)	Erk Tha Jerk
11.	"Never Sleep Interlude" (featuring Jahdan Blakkamoore)
12.	"Stay Asleep" (featuring Phil Da Agony)	DJ Toure
13.	"Law 15 Interlude"
14.	"Submit"	DJ Toure
15.	"Combine The Coasts Pt.1"	Adam Sampler
16.	"War Weary Interlude"
17.	"Combine The Coasts Pt.2"	Adam Sampler
18.	"All Kinds Of Em" (featuring Husalah)	Statik Selektah
19.	"PGM/A.R. All Day Interlude"
20.	"Real Hood (Remix)"	DJ Child; Lee Majors
21.	"Cherry Pie" (featuring Freddie Gibbs, Jynx)	Jeffro
22.	"So Many Animals"	Tynethys
23.	"So Many Animals (Remix)" (featuring Fed-X)	DJ Child
24.	"Critical Thinker Interlude"
25.	"Fallen Soldiers Interlude"
26.	"Freedom Writers" (featuring Hollow Tip, T-Wayne)	Pakslap
27.	"Highway Robbery Outro"
