= Border Wars (album) =

Studio album by Berner and The Jacka
- Released: December 27, 2012
- Genre: Hip hop
- Length: 1:02:22
- Label: The Product Records; Rapbay; Urbanlife Music

Berner and The Jacka chronology
Obey (2012)	Border Wars (2012)	Misfits (2012)

Border Wars is a collaboration album between American rappers Berner and The Jacka. The album includes guest appearances from Rappin' 4-Tay, San Quinn, Liqz and Messy Marv.

== Track listing ==
#	Title	length
1	Intro	0:25
2	Thank You (featuring Liqz & Messy Marv)	4:47
3	Iller Shit (featuring Joe Blow, Lil Goofy, Lil Uno & Fed-X)	5:29
4	I'm Throwed	4:16
5	Never Pull Over (featuring Lil Goofy & San Quinn)	4:01
6	On Dope (featuring Lucky Luciano)	4:02
7	State To State (featuring Shoboat)	2:50
8	Must've Been Love feat: Lucky Luciano	3:53
9	Frisco 2 Rosa feat: Ray Luv	4:19
10	I Smoke (featuring Rankin' Scroo)	2:10
11	Real Player (featuring Lil Goofy & San Quinn)	3:48
12	No Answer feat: Joe Blow / Liqz	3:58
13	Can't Hold It In (featuring Cozmo, Willie Hen & Lucky Luciano)	4:37
14	Players' Conversation (featuring Rappin' 4-Tay & Ray Luv)	4:13
15	You Know I'm High (featuring Joe Blow & Liqz)	3:47
16	Spray Em feat: Lil Goofy / Big Heez / Liqz	4:54
17	Outro	0:53
