= The Jack Artist =

Studio album by The Jacka
- Released: August 15, 2005
- Recorded: December 2003
- Genre: Hip hop
- Label: The Artist Records
- Producer: RobLo; Maki; Sync Knock

The Jacka chronology
Jacka of the Mob Figaz (2001)	The Jack Artist (2005)	Jack Of All Trades (2006)

Professional ratings
Review scores
Source	Rating
RapReviews	10/10 stars

The Jack Artist is the second studio album by American rapper The Jacka. It was released on March 15, 2005, through The Artist Records. Recording sessions took place at The Grill Studios in Emeryville. All songs were produced by Maki & RobLo of Blahk Operah Muzik with the exception of "Girls Say", which was produced by Sync Knock. The whole album was executive produced and written by The Jacka.

Guest features include Dubb 20, J Stalin, RobLo, Fed-X, Cormega, Rydah J. Klyde, Keak Da Sneak, Yukmouth, AP.9, Husalah, Ampachino, Shania D., TrueQ, Akata, and Lil' Ric. The album sold around a total of 200,000 units but was failed to chart.

The tracks "Barney (More Crime) and "Never Blink" were both released as singles in 2004, and both had videos filmed for them.

== Track listing ==
1. "Never Blink" (featuring J. Stalin & Dubb 20)
2. "Iller Clip"
3. "Get Out There" (featuring Roblo) (guitar by Niccolo Banks)
4. "Standing by Starz" (featuring Fed-X)
5. "Barney (More Crime)" [Remix] (featuring Cormega & Rydah J. Klyde)
6. "Girls Say"
7. "Lookin' at It" (featuring Keak Da Sneak and Yukmouth)
8. "Sometimes I" (featuring Mob Figaz)
9. "Never Equal" (featuring Ampichino)
10. "Feel This Clip"
11. "Really Dope" (featuring Dubb 20 & Husalah) (guitar by Niccolo Banks)
12. "Delicate Lifestyle" (featuring Trueq & Husalah)
13. "Turned Out (Action)" (featuring Akata)
14. "Blind World" (featuring Husalah)
15. "Drugged Out" (featuring Fed-X)
16. "Hey Girl" (Remix) (featuring Husalah)
17. "Won't Break Me" (featuring Lil' Ric)
18. "Kuran"
19. "Barney (More Crime)"

== Sample credits ==
(Note that these were provided through a third-party website as the original release has no credits)

- "Barney (More Crime)" contains elements from "Winter Time" by Steve Miller Band
- "Never Blink" contains elements from "Suddenly" by Billy Ocean
- "Drugged Out" contains elements from "The Turn Of A Friendly Card (Pt. 2)" by The Alan Parsons Project
