= Misfits (Blanco & The Jacka album) =

Studio album by Blanco & The Jacka
- Released: February 12, 2013
- Genre: Hip hop
- Length: 37:30
- Label: Guerilla Entertainment
- Producer: Araabmuzik

Blanco & The Jacka chronology
Border Wars (2012)	Misfits (2013)	Game Over (2013)

Misfits is a collaboration album between rappers Blanco & The Jacka, released on February 12, 2013. It includes guest appearances from Dru Down, Mistah F.A.B. & Husalah, among others. The album cover is a tribute to the American rock band Misfits.

== Critical reception ==
Punknews.org gave the album 3/5 stars saying, "Misfits is a bait-and-switch in the purest sense, and is actually not too bad for a product resulting from a sale based in false pretenses. The vast number of contributors gives the piece a flow, featuring a multitude of vocal delivery styles. But one has to wonder, are so many people packed on here because they want to give everyone a shot, or because most of the participants can't carry a whole release themselves? Still, this is one of the most interesting curios of the year." RapReviews gave it 6.5/10 and concluded that "It's evidently not everybody's cup of tea. It's hard to extract meaning from both individual verses and the overall concept. Still there's surprisingly little discord throughout the disc. This is Bay street shit, unusually packaged and produced, but nonetheless reflective of the vibe the scene is on, a scene that is still going strong, last but not least because of its ability to adapt."

== Track listing ==
#	Title	length
1	"Pretentious" (featuring Dru Down, Bust Pipes & Pressure)	4:01
2	Narcissist (featuring Husalah, Krondon & Fed-X)	6:41
3	"Optimistic" (featuring C-Plus & Lil Rue)	6:17
4	"Pessimistic" (featuring Mistah F.A.B.)	4:30
5	"Anxiety" (featuring DB Tha General & Lee Majors)	5:24
6	"Sociopath" (featuring Lil Rue)	4:31
7	"Fear" (featuring Husalah)	2:42
8	"Bipolar" (featuring Bust Pipes & Pressure)	3:24
