= The West Coast Don =

Studio album by Yukmouth
- Released: July 14, 2009
- Genre: West Coast hip-hop; gangsta rap
- Length: 1:15:45
- Label: Smoke-A-Lot; RBC
- Producer: Arson; Knock; L.A.; Mark Knoxx; Nan Dogg; Nexxus; P. Killer Trackz; Raw Beatzz; Rek Beats; Reo; S-Class; Scorp Dezel; The Slapboyz

Yukmouth chronology
Million Dollar Mouthpiece (2008)	The West Coast Don (2009)	Free at Last (2010)

Professional ratings
Review scores
Source	Rating
AllMusic	3/5 stars
HipHopDX	2.5/5

The West Coast Don is the fifth solo studio album by American rapper Yukmouth. It was released on July 14, 2009, via Smoke-A-Lot/RBC Records. Production was handled by Knock, Arson, Mark Knoxx, P. Killer Trackz, Reo, Scorp Dezel, The Slapboyz, L.A., Nan Dogg, Nexxus, Raw Beatzz, Rek Beats, and S-Class. It features guest appearances from Dyson, Baby Bash, Big Meech, C-Bo, Chop Black, Crooked I, Dru Down, Glasses Malone, Jerold Lee, Keak da Sneak, Mac Dre, Matt Blaque, Mistah F.A.B., Ray J, Sky Balla, The Jacka, T-Pain, Turf Talk, and members of The Regime. The album debuted at number 44 on the Top R&B/Hip-Hop Albums and number 20 on the Top Rap Albums charts in the United States.

== Track listing ==
All tracks are written by Jerold D. Ellis.

No.	Title	Producer(s)	Length
1.	"Cocka Roaches"	Nan Dogg	2:32
2.	"West Coast Geez"	Arson; Mark Knoxx	4:34
3.	"I'm a Gangsta" (featuring Dyson, Ray J and Crooked I)	The Slapboyz; Nexxus	4:01
4.	"They Like My Swag"	Reo	3:51
5.	"Da Town" (featuring Chop Black, Jerold Lee and Keak da Sneak)	Scorp Dezel	4:34
6.	"Ain't Nobody Fuckin with Me"	Scorp Dezel	4:31
7.	"I'm on Like Shit" (featuring Sky Balla, Mistah F.A.B. and Turf Talk)	L.A.	5:22
8.	"Big Meech" (featuring Big Meech)	Knock	3:59
9.	"Pimpin 4 Real" (featuring Dyson, Mac Dre and Dru Down)	P. Killer Trackz	4:18
10.	"Got Gwop"	Raw Beatzz	4:44
11.	"L.A. Shit"	Knock	4:12
12.	"Up All Nite" (featuring Matt Blaque, The Jacka and Glasses Malone)	The Slapboyz	4:28
13.	"Blind Livin" (featuring Tha Realest and Dyson)	P. Killer Trackz	4:00
14.	"44" (featuring T-Pain)	Reo	3:26
15.	"Stay on It" (featuring C-Bo and Dyson)	Rek Beats	2:55
16.	"Sumthen Special" (featuring Dyson and Baby Bash)	S-Class	3:13
17.	"Go Home"	Knock	4:58
18.	"Sum Dem Murder" (performed by The Regime)	Arson; Mark Knoxx	6:07
Total length:			1:15:45

== Charts ==
Chart (2009)	Peak position
US Top R&B/Hip-Hop Albums (Billboard)	44
US Top Rap Albums (Billboard)	20
