= C-Bo's Mob Figaz =

Studio album by Mob Figaz
- Released: May 18, 1999
- Studio: Candy Shop (Sacramento, CA); The Grill (Oakland, CA); Honey Comb Hideout (San Francisco, CA); Back Door Productions (Pittsburg, CA); Bombshelter (Oakland, CA)
- Genre: West Coast hip hop; gangsta rap; mafioso rap
- Length: 1:11:19
- Label: West Coast Mafia Records; Git Paid Entertainment
- Producer: C-Bo (exec.); DJ Daryl; JT the Bigga Figga; Kezo; Lev Berlak; Moe ZMD; One Drop Scott; RobLo; Wilson "Flexxx" Hankins

Mob Figaz chronology
C-Bo's Mob Figaz (1999)	The Comp (2001)

Professional ratings
Review scores
Source	Rating
The Animal Planet	5/5 stars

C-Bo's Mob Figaz is the debut studio album by American West Coast hip hop supergroup Mob Figaz. It was released on May 18, 1999, via West Coast Mafia Records/Git Paid Entertainment. Production was handled by Kezo, Lev Berlak, One Drop Scott, DJ Daryl, RobLo, SupaFlexXx, JT the Bigga Figga and Mo Stewart, with C-Bo serving as executive producer. It features guest appearances from C-Bo, Huccabucc, Young Kyoz, Spice 1, B.A., LaToya London, Marvaless, N4SA, Steady Mobb'n, Unda P, Young Meek and Yukmouth. It peaked at number 63 on the Top R&B/Hip-Hop Albums chart in the US.

== Track listing ==
No.	Title	Producer(s)	Length
1.	"Armaggedon" (featuring C-Bo)	Lev Berlak; Wilson Hankins	5:07
2.	"Hustlin in the Rain"	Lev Berlak; RobLo	5:12
3.	"If You Buyin" (featuring LaToya London)	RobLo; Lev Berlak (co.); Jason "J-Dino" Moss (co.)	4:36
4.	"Mo Money" (featuring C-Bo, Kaos and Huccabucc)	Kezo	4:42
5.	"Soldiers Paradise" (featuring Steady Mobb'n)	DJ Daryl	3:38
6.	"New Beginning" (featuring P.O.D.E.)	1-Drop Scott	4:27
7.	"Tailor Made"	Lev Berlak; Wilson Hankins	5:10
8.	"Fastlane" (featuring C-Bo)	Moe Stewart	3:59
9.	"Prepare to Die" (featuring C-Bo, Young Meek, Huccabucc and Marvaless)	JT the Bigga Figga	4:27
10.	"High Stakes" (featuring B.A. and Yukmouth)	1-Drop Scott	3:37
11.	"Without My 5"	1-Drop Scott	4:36
12.	"Secret of the 5"	Kezo	5:18
13.	"Mafioso Type" (featuring C-Bo)	DJ Daryl	5:16
14.	"Mob Fashion" (featuring Kaos and Spice 1)	Kezo	5:26
15.	"Thug World" (featuring C-Bo and Spice 1)	Kezo	5:48
Total length:			1:11:19

== Personnel ==
- AP.9 – main artist
- Fed-X – main artist
- Bob "Husalah" James – main artist
- Rydah J. Klyde – main artist
- Dominick "The Jacka" Newton – main artist
- Shawn "C-Bo" Thomas – featured artist (tracks: 1, 4, 8, 9, 13, 15), executive producer
- LaToya London – featured artist (track 3)
- Huc-A-Buc – featured artist (tracks: 4, 9)
- Kevin "Kaos" Crockett – featured artist (tracks: 4, 14)
- Aaron "Crooked Eye" Edmand – featured artist (track 5)
- Billy "Bavgate" Moore – featured artist (track 5)
- N4SA – featured artist (track 6)
- Unda P – featured artist (track 6)
- Young Meek – featured artist (track 9)
- Marva "Marvaless" Cooks – featured artist (track 9)
- Lamore "B.A." Jacks – featured artist (track 10)
- Jerold "Yukmouth" Ellis III – featured artist (track 10)
- Robert "Spice 1" Green Jr. – featured artist (tracks: 14, 15)
- Jason "J-Dino" Moss – guitar (track 1), co-producer (track 3), mixing
- Lev Berlak – producer (tracks: 1, 2, 7), co-producer (track 3), mixing
- Wilson "Flexx" Hankins – producer (tracks: 1, 7)
- R. "Roblow" Mixon – producer (tracks: 2, 3)
- Kezo – producer (tracks: 4, 12, 14, 15)
- Daryl Anderson – producer (tracks: 5, 13), mixing (track 13)
- Scott "1 Drop Scott" Roberts – producer (tracks: 6, 10, 11)
- Maurice "Mo-Z" Stewart – producer (track 8)
- Joseph "JT the Bigga Figga" Tom – producer (track 9)
- Ken Lee – mastering
- Ghostribe Graphix – layout, design

== Charts ==
Chart (1999)	Peak position
US Top R&B/Hip-Hop Albums (Billboard)	63
