= Block Shit =

Studio album by Yukmouth and Tha Gamblaz
- Released: November 13, 2001
- Genre: Hip hop, gangsta rap
- Length: 47:59
- Label: Get Low Recordz

Yukmouth chronology
Thug Lord: The New Testament (2001)	Block Shit (2001)	United Ghettos of America (2002)

Tha Gamblaz chronology
Ghetto Platinum: Movie Soundtrack (2000)	Block Shit (2001)

Block Shit is a collaborative album by Bay-Area rappers Yukmouth and Tha Gamblaz, released on November 13, 2001.

== Track listing ==
1. "World Domination" (featuring Get Low Playaz)
2. "Block Shit" (featuring Phats Bossalini, Dru Down, Mac Mall & Troopa)
3. "Never Let Em See You Sweat"
4. "Callin' Shots"
5. "Fuck The Ice" (featuring JT Tha Bigga Figga)
6. "Buckle Up" (featuring Phats Bossalini & Dru Down)
7. "Trying 2 Survive" (featuring La Joi)
8. "Jim Hats" (featuring Keak Da Sneak & Numskull)
9. "Tryna Bubble" (featuring Dirty Red)
10. "Suckas" (featuring Spice 1, Roger Troutman, & Too Short)
11. "Thug Niggas" (featuring Phats Bossalini)
12. "Real Shit"
