= Can You Feel Me =

Studio album by Dru Down
- Released: September 3, 1996
- Recorded: 1995–96
- Studio: Infinite Studios (Alameda, California); Backroom Studios (Glendale, California); Power Play Studios (Oakland, California); The Grill (Emeryville, California); Umoja Vibe; Bosko's Digital Chicken And Beats (Los Angeles, California); Blackhole Studio
- Genre: West Coast hip hop; gangsta rap; g-funk
- Length: 1:13:32
- Label: Relativity
- Producer: Chris Hicks (also exec.); Alonzo Jackson; Big D the Impossible; Bosko; DJ Battlecat; DJ Daryl; DJ Fuze; DJ Terry T; Jamiel Hassan; Kenny McCloud; Lev Berlak; Mo Stewart; Soopafly; The Whole 9

Dru Down chronology
Explicit Game (1994)	Can You Feel Me (1996)	Pimpin' Phernelia (2001)

Singles from Can You Feel Me
- 1. "Can You Feel Me" Released: August 6, 1996; 2. "Baby Bubba" Released: February 25, 1997

Professional ratings
Review scores
Source	Rating
AllMusic	4.5/5 stars

Can You Feel Me is the third studio album by American rapper Dru Down. It was released in 1996 through C-Note/Relativity Records. Recording sessions took place at Infinite Studios in Alameda, at Backroom Studios in Glendale, at Power Play Studios in Oakland, at The Grill in Emeryville, at Umoja Vibe, at Bosko's Digital Chicken And Beats in Los Angeles, and at Blackhole Studio near Los Angeles. Production was handled by DJ Fuze, Alonzo Jackson, Lev Berlak, The Whole 9, Maurice "Butch" Stewart, Big D the Impossible, Bosko, DJ Battlecat, DJ Daryl, Jamiel Hassan, Kenny McCloud, Soopafly and Terry T, with Chris "C&H" Hicks serving as executive producer. It features guest appearances from Luniz, Bootsy Collins, Eklipze, Knucklehead, L.V., Nick Nac, Poppa LQ and T-Luni. The album peaked at number 54 on the Billboard 200 chart and number 14 on the Top R&B Albums chart in the United States. It spawned two singles: "Can You Feel Me" and "Baby Bubba". Its lead single reached #92 on the Billboard Hot 100 singles chart.

== Track listing ==
No.	Title	Writer(s)	Producer(s)	Length
1.	"Intro"	Danyel Robinson	DJ Fuze	0:53
2.	"Playa fo Real"	Robinson; Kevin Gilliam; Herbie Hancock	DJ Battlecat	4:28
3.	"Baby Bubba" (featuring Bootsy Collins)	Robinson; Alonzo Jackson	Alonzo Jackson	4:13
4.	"Can You Feel Me"	Robinson; David Elliot; Mark Morales; Damon Wimbley; Darren Robinson; Daniel Harris; Kurtis Walker; David Ogrin	DJ Fuze	4:12
5.	"Choppin' It Up"	Robinson; Lev Berlak	Lev Berlak; C&H (co.)	4:54
6.	"Head & Shoulders"	Robinson; Berlak; Vaughan Mason; Duane Hughes; Russell "Butch" Deyo	Lev Berlak	4:52
7.	"Mista Busta"	Robinson; Daryl Anderson	DJ Daryl	4:25
8.	"Hustlin' Ain't No Thang"	Robinson; Elliot; Jalil Hutchins; John Fletcher; Lawrence Smith	DJ Fuze	4:34
9.	"The Game"	Christopher Hicks; Curtis Mayfield	Jamiel Hassan	2:51
10.	"Breezy" (featuring Yukmouth and Poppa LQ)	Robinson; Jerold Ellis; Kenneth Green; Bosko Kante; Garrick Husbands	Bosko	5:13
11.	"Freaks Come Out" (featuring Luniz and L.V.)	Robinson; Ellis; Husbands; Larry Sanders; John Rhone; Ontario Haynes	The Whole 9; Moe ZMD	4:24
12.	"Deal Went Bad"	Robinson; Terrence Butler	Terry T.	4:00
13.	"Underestimated" (featuring Soopafly)	Robinson; Priest Brooks	Soopafly	4:23
14.	"I'm Wondering"	Robinson; Kenneth McCloud	Kenny McCloud	4:24
15.	"Suspect One"	Robinson; Rhone; Haynes	The Whole 9; Moe ZMD	5:14
16.	"500 Mobsters"	Robinson; Jackson	Alonzo Jackson	3:22
17.	"The Mobb" (featuring Luniz, Knucklehead, Eklipze, NicNac and T-Luni)	Robinson; Ellis; Husbands; Knuckle Head; Erick Carson; Demetrius Nicole Lyles; Tamarr Holloway; Deon Evans; Isaac Hayes	Big D the Impossible	7:10
Total length:				1:13:32

== Samples ==
- Track 2 contains elements from "Chameleon" by Herbie Hancock
- Track 4 contains replayed elements from The Fat Boys' "Can You Feel It" written by Mark Morales, Damon Wimbley, Darren Robinson, Daniel Harris, Kurtis Walker and David Ogrin
- Track 6 contains replayed elements from "The Smerphies Dance" written by Duane Hughes, Vaughan Mason and Russell "Butch" Deyo
- Track 8 contains elements from "I'm a Hoe" written by Jalil Hutchins, John Fletcher and Larry Smith
- Track 9 contains elements from "Freddie's Dead" by Curtis Mayfield
- Track 17 contains replayed elements from "Ike's Mood" by Isaac Hayes

== Personnel ==
- Danyel "Dru Down" Robinson – main artist
- William "Bootsy" Collins – featured artist (track 3)
- Jerold "Yukmouth" Ellis III – featured artist (tracks: 10, 11, 17)
- Kenneth "Poppa LQ" Green – featured artist (track 10)
- Garrick "Numskull" Husbands – featured artist (tracks: 11, 17)
- Larry "L.V." Sanders – featured artist (track 11)
- Knuckle Head – featured artist (track 17)
- Erick "Eklipze" Carson – featured artist (track 17)
- Demetrius Nicole "Nic Nac" Lyles – featured artist (track 17)
- Tamarr "T-Luni" Holloway – featured artist (track 17)
- Christopher "C&H" Hicks – backing vocals & co-producer (track 5), executive producer
- Dave Dalson – backing vocals (track 12)
- David "DJ Fuze" Elliot – producer (tracks: 1, 4, 8)
- Kevin "BattleCat" Gilliam – producer (track 2)
- Alonzo Jackson – producer (tracks: 3, 16), recording (tracks: 3, 11, 13, 15, 16)
- Lev Berlak – producer (tracks: 5, 6)
- Daryl "DJ Daryl" Anderson – producer (track 7)
- Jamiel Hassan – producer, recording & mixing (track 9)
- Bosko Kante – producer, recording & mixing (track 10)
- John Rhone – producer (tracks: 11, 15)
- Ontario D. Haynes – producer (tracks: 11, 15)
- Maurice "Moe ZMD" Stewart – producer (tracks: 11, 15)
- Terrence "Terry T." Butler – producer (track 12)
- Priest "Soopafly" Brooks – producer (track 13)
- Kenny McCloud – producer, recording & mixing (track 14)
- Deon "Big D" Evans – producer (track 17)
- Michael Denten – recording (tracks: 1, 4, 8, 12), mixing (tracks: 1, 3, 4, 8, 11–13, 15, 16)
- Tim 'Flash' Mariner – engineering (track 2)
- Michael Schlesinger – mix engineering (track 2)
- Aaron McInnes – mix engineering assistant (track 2)
- DeAndre Griffin – engineering assistant (track 3)
- John "Indo" Neilson – recording (tracks: 5–7), mixing (tracks: 5–7, 17)
- Jason Moss – recording (track 17)
- Victor Hall – photography
- David Bett – design

== Charts ==
Chart (1996)	Peak position
US Billboard 200	54
US Top R&B Albums (Billboard)	14
