= Obey (Blanco and The Jacka album) =

Studio album by Blanco & The Jacka
- Released: October 16, 2012
- Genre: Hip-hop
- Length: 37:45
- Label: Guerilla Entertainment

Blanco & The Jacka chronology
Raw (2012)	Obey (2012)	Border Wars (2007)

Obey is a collaboration album between American rappers Blanco and The Jacka, released on October 16, 2012. It includes guest appearances from Freeway, Mistah F.A.B., Ampichino & Messy Marv, among others. The cover art for Obey is a tribute to the painting Andre the Giant Has a Posse. Music videos have been filmed for "Submit" featuring Freeway and "This Is Your God" featuring Ampichino & Messy Marv.

== Track listing ==
#	Title	length
1	Submit (featuring Freeway)	3:29
2	This Is Your God (featuring Ampichino & Messy Marv)	6:52
3	No Imagination (featuring Freeway)	4:42
4	Conform (featuring Dru Down, Krondon & Lee Majors)	5:22
5	Stay Asleep (featuring Phil Da Agony & Freeway)	6:30
6	Consume (featuring Balance, Mistah F.A.B. & Mitchy Slick)	6:02
7	Do Not Question Authority (featuring Lee Majors)	4:48
