= Futuristic Mob =

Studio album by The Jacka & DuBBleOO
- Released: July 30, 2013
- Genre: Hip hop
- Length: 53:08
- Label: Space Age Entertainment

The Jacka & DuBBleOO chronology
Game Over (2013)	Futuristic Mob (2013)	The Appeal (2013)

Futuristic Mob is a collaboration album between American rappers The Jacka and DuBBleOO. It includes guest appearances from J. Stalin and E-40, among other artists.

Music videos have been filmed for "100 100's" featuring T Wayne, "Time Standing Still" featuring J. Stalin, "Wallet So Fat" and "My Dreams".

== Track listing ==
#	Title	length
1	100 100's (featuring T Wayne)	4:23
2	Skit	0:40
3	Time Standing Still (featuring J. Stalin)	3:32
4	My Dreams	3:23
5	Aqurius	3:39
6	In My Spaceship (featuring Macrhuger, Lee Majors & Fed-X)	4:09
7	Bay Area Championship (featuring Lee Majors)	4:03
8	VIP (featuring E-40)	2:36
9	Sick	1:46
10	Excuse Me	3:47
11	Hottest in the Summer	2:50
12	How Many Racks	3:40
13	Wallet So Fat	3:34
14	What Am I Supposed to Do (featuring Stubby)	3:00
15	Long Way	3:13
16	The Streets (featuring Arjay)	4:53
