= Mob Trial 3 =

Studio album by The Jacka, Fed-X & AP.9
- Released: May 20, 2008
- Genre: Hip hop
- Length: 56:41
- Labels: Million Dollar Dream; Sumo Entertainment
- Producers: Nick Peace; Tone Capone; RobLo; Indecent; Big D

The Jacka, Fed-X & AP.9 chronology
Mob Trial 2 (2007)	Mob Trial 3 (2008)	The Street Album (2008)

Mob Trial 3, also called Mob Trial 3: The Verdict, is a collaboration album between American rappers and Mob Figaz members The Jacka, Fed-X & AP.9, released on May 20, 2008. It peaked at #91 on the R&B/Hip-Hop Albums chart, making it The Jacka's first charting album, and Fed-X and AP.9's only charting album to date. The album is the third, and most successful, album of the Mob Trial trilogy.

== Track listing ==
#	Title	length
1	Shed Blood (performed by AP.9)	3:35
2	Three Piece Suit (Shop Around) [performed by Fed-X]	3:48
3	The Hood In Me (performed by The Jacka)	3:27
4	Made Men (performed by AP.9 & Fed-X featuring Lee Majors)	3:52
5	Love 4 the Streets (My Testimony)	3:55
6	California Gangsta (Livin' it Up) [performed by The Jacka & Fed-X]	3:10
7	African Warrior(performed by The Jacka)	3:54
8	Snitch's Worst Nightmare (performed by AP.9)	3:13
9	Hit Men (performed by Fed-X)	3:31
10	Throw It Up (performed by The Jacka featuring J. Stalin & Dubb 20)	3:12
11	Get My Money Up (performed by AP.9 featuring Rydah J. Klyde)	3:42
12	Cocaine Race (performed by The Jacka)	3:25
13	Confessions of the Husalah (Interview) [performed by The Husalah]	3:10
14	Broken Chains (Interview) [performed by AP.9]	3:39
15	Interrogation Room (Interview) [performed by Fed-X]	3:45
16	American Dream [performed by The Jacka]	3:37
