= Flight Risk (album) =

Studio album by The Jacka
- Released: January 11, 2011
- Genre: Hip hop
- Length: 31:48
- Label: Siccness.net
- Producer: Batkave; Brick Beats; Isiah Salazar

The Jacka chronology
Devilz Rejects 2: House of the Dead (2010)	Flight Risk (2011)	The Sentence (2012)

Flight Risk is a seventh album by American rapper The Jacka, released on January 11, 2011. It peaked at No. 70 on the Top R&B/Hip-Hop Albums chart.

Flight Risk includes guest appearances from Yukmouth, Styles P, Turf Talk & C-Bo, amongst other artists.

"Streetlife" contains samples of "Before The Night Is Over" by Joe Simon

== Track listing ==
#	Title	length
1	We Know	2:59
2	Rich (featuring I-Rocc)	3:20
3	So High	2:43
4	Knockin Niggas Off	3:11
5	Thinkin of You	3:12
6	First Date (featuring 12 Gauge Shotie & Turf Talk)	3:25
7	Where the Mobstas Are (featuring Chazz & Smigg Dirtee)	3:25
8	On My Side (featuring C-Bo & Smigg Dirtee)	3:37
9	God (featuring Styles P)	3:29
10	This Lil City of Ours (featuring Dubee & Yukmouth)	3:51
11	Streetlife	4:36
