= Houston Metropolitan Dance Company =

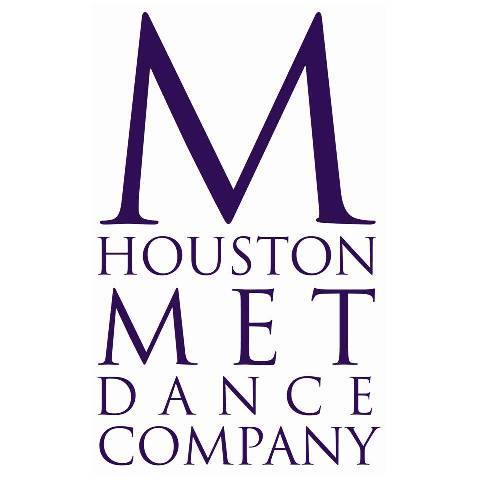

General information
- Name: Houston Metropolitan Dance Company
- Year founded: 1995
- Founders: Michelle Smith
- Website: www.metdance.org

Senior staff
- Director: Michelle Smith

Artistic staff
- Artistic director: Marlana Doyle
- Resident choreographers: Kiki Lucas

Other
- Associated schools: Houston Metropolitan Dance Center

The Houston Metropolitan Dance Company (HMDC) is a Houston-based dance troupe that has showcased the work of emerging and established contemporary and jazz choreographers from all over the world since 1995. Helmed by founder and Executive Director Michelle Smith and Artistic Director Marlana Doyle, the company is the sister organization to the Houston Metropolitan Dance Center, which opened the doors to a newly renovated facility in July 2013. Houston's second-largest dance training space, the center offers a large number of dance classes in multiple disciplines to students of all experience levels, ages 3 and up, and is home to HMDC and the Houston Met Too youth training company.

== History ==
Since its inception, HDMC has presented the choreography of over 30 artists in Houston and throughout the United States. As of 2013, the company’s repertory consists of 55 pieces, including works by Resident Choreographer Kiki Lucas, Robert Battle (Artistic Director, Alvin Ailey American Dance Theater), Doug Bentz, Nina Buisson, Christine Carlson, Joe Celej, Peter Chu (Artistic Director, chuthis), Salim Gauwloos, Charlotte Griffin, Larry Keigwin (Artistic Director, KEIGWIN + COMPANY), Kiesha Lalama-White, Caleb Mitchell, Robbie Moore, Pattie Obey, Jason Parsons, Erin Reck (Recked Productions), Kate Skarpetowska, Suzi Taylor, Jane Weiner (Artistic Director, Hope Stone Dance Company) and Kevin Wynn.

In 2013, the company moved from its longtime location in Houston's Museum District to a new facility in Midtown Houston. The 2014–15 season opened with Indivisible at the Hobby Center for the Performing Arts, featuring works by choreographers Joe Celej, Larry Keigwin, jhon r. stronks, and Steven Vaughn.

In addition to frequent appearances throughout Houston and the surrounding area, HDMC has performed at the Brazos Contemporary Dance Festival (College Station, TX), YES! Dance Invitation (Richmond, VA), the Great Friends Dance Festival (Newport, RI), Dance St. Louis, the Baruch Performing Arts Center during the REVERBdance Festival (New York, NY), the Skirball Center for the Performing Arts during Dance Gotham (New York, NY), the Barefoot Brigade Dance Festival (Fort Worth, TX), the Boston Contemporary Dance Festival, the Inside/Out Series at Jacob's Pillow, the Grier School Gala (Tyrone, PA), the Midwestern Arts Conference (Columbus, OH), Dance Chicago and the Dallas Morning News Festival.

== Education ==
The Houston Metropolitan Dance Center is a comprehensive training ground offering classes in ballet, jazz, tap, modern and hip-hop to students of varying needs and levels, ages 3 through adult. The faculty consists of HMDC members, other local teaching artists and guest master teachers from around the country.

The center is the home base for HMDC’s educational outreach program “Swing, Jive, and Pop into Dance,” which explores the history of the art of dance through performance and narration, reaching thousands of children each year via in-school performances, demonstrations and field trips. The building also houses the Houston Met Too, a non-competitive youth training company that aims to develop the skills and styles required to execute the main company’s diverse and versatile repertory. Each season, members have the opportunity to perform throughout Houston and to participate in master classes led by HMDC’s visiting choreographers. On average, the junior company consists of 14 members ranging in age from 13 to 18.

== Artistic staff ==
Executive Director Michelle Smith’s early dance background includes extensive training from the New York City Ballet and San Francisco Ballet. After receiving her BA from Texas Christian University, she joined the Delia Stewart Dance Company, working first as principal dancer, then as company manager and director of the school. As director, she established a children’s program and diversified the adults’ program, which together formed the foundation for the Houston Metropolitan Dance Center.

Artistic Director Marlana Doyle is a graduate of Point Park University and has been dancing with HMDC since 2002. She has served on many grant and organizational panels for the Houston Arts Alliance and was awarded the Dance/USA Leadership Mentee Fellowship for the Institute of Training in 2013.

Kiki Lucas is the resident choreographer and a senior dancer for HMDC, and also directs the Houston Met Too youth company. Lucas has presented her choreography and taught throughout the country and abroad.

== Dancers ==
HMDC maintains a roster of 9 to 13 dancers, including apprentices.

- Cynthia Harada
- Allie Kronick
- Kerry Jackson
- Max Jones
- Terrill Mitchell
- Noa Tumpkin
- Lisa Wolff
- Mia Angelini (apprentice)
- Patti Hogan (apprentice)
