= The Street Album =

Studio album by The Jacka
- Released: November 4, 2008
- Genre: Gangsta rap
- Length: 1:07:51
- Label: The Artist Records
- Producer: Miguel Flores

The Jacka chronology
Drought Season (2008)	The Street Album (2008)	The Price of Money (2009)

The Street Album is the third studio album by American rapper The Jacka. It includes guest appearances from Keak da Sneak, Messy Marv, The Federation & Dem Hoodstarz, amongst other artists. The Street Album peaked at #80 on the R&B/Hip-Hop Albums chart.

Music videos have been filmed for the songs "Wit the S**t" featuring J-Diggs & Joe Blow, "Aspen", "All Over Me" featuring Dem Hoodstarz, Messy Marv, Keak da Sneak & Fed-X and "F**k Everybody".

== Critical response ==
In a mixed review, XXL editor The Infamous O stated "In a lot of ways the kid, Jacka, is reminiscent of a young 50 Cent with his choice in production and sound. The same way 50 used the mixtape to showcase his ability to create music over all kinds of sounds and samples, Jacka uses The Street Album to demonstrate that his potential goes beyond head knocking hip-hop like most upcoming MCs. But his true self lies in the street cuts where he speaks with such grunts that sometimes it’s hard to make out what he’s saying. It sounds like it rhymes, but only he and his true followers know for sure."

== Track listing ==
#	Title	length
1	Husalah Intro	0:38
2	A Real Feeling	4:36
3	No Future	3:14
4	For the Mob (featuring Doon Koon, The Federation & Goldie)	3:49
5	We on Patron (featuring Dubb 20, Frank Sticks & Fed-X)	3:39
6	Fed Up (featuring J-Diggs & Young L)	4:16
7	Interlude	1:12
8	Crown Me	2:36
9	For the Block	5:07
10	Not Me (featuring Cellski & D-Dre)	3:07
11	That's Me (featuring Matt Blaque)	1:29
12	Addiction	1:54
13	Aspen	4:20
14	Drug Life (featuring Jimathez)	3:44
15	With the S**t (featuring Joe Blow & J-Diggs)	3:41
16	A Million (featuring Willie Joe & Big Rich)	3:19
17	From the Streets (featuring Deltrice)	2:23
18	Is That You (featuring Joe Blow & Young Hyfee)	1:30
19	F**k Everybody	3:21
20	All Over Me (featuring Dem Hoodstarz, Messy Marv, Keak da Sneak & Fed-X)	5:41
21	The End	3:25
