= The Price of Money =

Studio album by The Jacka & 12 Gauge Shotie
- Released: January 20, 2009
- Genre: Hip hop
- Length: 37:52
- Label: Youz Guyz Entertainment
- Producer: J. Elliot

The Jacka & 12 Gauge Shotie chronology
| The Street Album (2008) | The Price of Money (2009) | Tear Gas (2009) |

The Price of Money is a collaboration album between American rappers The Jacka & 12 Gauge Shotie, released on January 20, 2009. It peaked at #88 on the R&B/Hip-Hop Albums chart, making it 12 Gauge Shotie's first and only charting album to date. The album cover is a homage to the famed American game show The Price Is Right.

A music video has been filmed for the song "Should I".

"Sunshine" contains samples from the 1976 song "Sunshine" by the group Enchantment (band)

"Paper Long" contains samples from I Want You Back by The Jackson 5

"Dayz Like This" contains samples of Just to Keep You Satisfied by Marvin Gaye

"All My N*ggaz" contains samples of "I'll Be The Other Woman" by The Soul Children

== Track listing ==
| # | Title | length |
|---|---|---|
| 1 | Live Like This | 3:32 |
| 2 | Dope | 2:17 |
| 3 | Should I | 3:22 |
| 4 | Mob Sh*t | 2:09 |
| 5 | Callin' | 2:59 |
| 6 | Sunshine | 3:34 |
| 7 | Kan't Be Me | 4:46 |
| 8 | Throw It Up | 3:03 |
| 9 | Paper Long | 2:24 |
| 10 | Chop Out | 3:06 |
| 11 | Dayz Like This | 3:37 |
| 12 | All My N***az | 3:03 |
