= The Game Is Thick, Vol. 2 =

The Game Is Thick ... Part 2

Studio album by Mac Dre
- Released: October 19, 2004 (U.S.)
- Genre: Hip hop; hyphy
- Label: Thizz

Mac Dre chronology
| The Genie of the Lamp (2004) | The Game Is Thick ... Part 2 (2004) | Uncut (2006) |

The Game Is...Thick, Part 2 is the eleventh and final studio album by Bay Area rapper Mac Dre released on October 19, 2004. The album was released just 13 days before an unknown assailant shot and killed Hicks while driving on a freeway in Kansas City, Missouri.

According to writer Eric K. Arnold, The Game Is...Thick Part 2 debuted in the Billboard Bay Area Top 20.

The album name and cover gives nod to the 1988 album, "The Game Is Thick", by fellow Vallejo, California rapper, The MAC, who was an associate of Mac Dre before his death in 1991.

== Track listing ==
1. "Tha Introduction"
2. "Get Loud" (featuring Bad Business)
3. "Cutthoat Soup"
4. "Retro Dance Record"
5. "It Ain't Funny" (featuring Rydah J. Klyde)
6. "Don't Hate tha Playa"
7. "Cal Bear"
8. "Hotta Den Steam" (featuring PSD)
9. "Fedi's Theme" (featuring Mob Figaz & Meezy Montana)
10. "4 Much" (featuring Yukmouth)
11. "Screw-E-Boo-Boo" (featuring Black Jesus)
12. "Stool Pigeon" (featuring Dubee)
13. "Same Hood" (featuring Vital)
