= The Regime =

The Regime may refer to:

- The Regime (miniseries), an HBO miniseries starring Kate Winslet
- The Regime (novel), a novel by Tim LaHaye and Jerry B. Jenkins
- The Regime (group), an American hip hop group
