= Drought Season =

Studio album by Berner & The Jacka
- Released: April 22, 2008
- Genre: Hip hop
- Length: 58:59
- Label: City Hall; Bern One
- Producer: Cozmo; Dunce; Gennessee; RobLo; STINJ-E

Berner & The Jacka chronology
Drought Season (2008)	Drought Season 2 (2009)

Drought Season is a collaboration album between American rappers Berner & The Jacka, the first album of their Drought Season series. The album features guest appearances from Michael Marshall, B-Legit and San Quinn, among other artists.

Drought Season peaked at #55 on the R&B/Hip-Hop Albums chart and at #25 on the Rap Albums chart, making it Berner's first charting album and one of his most successful to date.

A music video has been filmed for "Purp" featuring B-Legit & Cozmo.

== Track listing ==
#	Title	Producer	Length
1	Keep It Flooded (performed by Berner)	Gennessee	4:29
2	Time Flies	Cozmo	4:46
3	Watch Me (featuring Fed-X)	Gennessee	4:17
4	Battlefield (featuring Baldhead Rick & Fed-X)	Dunce	3:33
5	Fresher (featuring Don Toriano)	RobLo	4:18
6	Drought Season (featuring Michael Marshall & San Quinn)	Gennessee	4:07
7	My Life (featuring Dubee)	STINJ-E	4:08
8	Look Up (featuring Cellski)	RobLo	3:38
9	Can't Walk (featuring Alcatraz & Matt Blaque)	Cozmo	4:51
10	Changed Man (featuring Sky Balla)	Cozmo	4:10
11	Purp (featuring B-Legit & Cozmo)	Cozmo	4:22
12	Fall Down	Gennessee	3:18
13	Keep It Street (featuring Equipto)	Dunce	4:14
14	Trap House (featuring Goldtoes & Don Toriano)	STINJ-E	4:19
