= Free at Last (Yukmouth album) =

Studio album by Yukmouth
- Released: June 1, 2010
- Genre: Gangsta rap
- Length: 79:23
- Labels: Smoke-a-Lot; RBC; Fontana
- Producers: So Crates; Sour Beats; Cheese Mac; L.A.; Street Commission; LP A.k.a Lil patron; Young Hustlah (misspelled) Young Hustluh; Tatem 1; D-Golder; Rob-E; Young Fyre; DJ Fresh; Scandal of The Whole Shabang; Jon-Jon On Da Beat; Cozmo; Randy Biddle; Scorp Dezel; Cozino

Yukmouth chronology
The West Coast Don (2009)	Free at Last (2010)	Thuggin' & Mobbin' (2011)

Free at Last is the sixth album by American rapper Yukmouth, released on June 1, 2010, under Smoke-a-Lot Records and RBC Records.

== Track listing ==
No.	Title	Writer(s)	Length
1.	"Free at Last" (featuring Country Black)	produced by Hippie Sabotage	5:10
2.	"The Life" (featuring Ya Boy, Jay Rock and London)		5:08
3.	"Laughin at You Clownz"		4:59
4.	"2-11" (featuring L.E.P. Bogus Boys)		3:53
5.	"She Want It" (featuring Rankin Scroo)		4:55
6.	"Smell It on Me" (featuring Gudda Gudda, Titty Boy and D-Golder)		4:03
7.	"100 Brick Boy" (featuring Lucci)		3:11
8.	"Let's Get It, Let's Go" (featuring Lil Hype, Ampichino, Lee Majors, Tha Realest, Freeze, Rah-Man and Matt Blaque)		4:34
9.	"Bang Bang"		2:06
10.	"Shine" (featuring Messy Marv and Choppa City)		4:19
11.	"The West Iz Back" (featuring Roccett and 2Eleven)		4:05
12.	"Rise 2 da Top"		4:03
13.	"Dat's Outta Here" (featuring Mistah F.A.B. and Chop Black)		4:17
14.	"The Hard Way" (featuring Jannine V, produced by V-TRAX)		3:40
15.	"So Trill" (featuring Lil Hyfe and Dru Down)		4:19
16.	"Pac-Man"		3:19
17.	"Smokin Treez" (featuring Currensy and Chop Black)		4:05
18.	"Hubba Rocks" (featuring Stevie Joe, Philthy Rich and Lee Majors)		4:08
19.	"Da Town (Remix)" (featuring Richie Rich, Beeda Weeda, Agerman, Kafani, Shady Nate, Lee Majors, G-Stack and London)		5:22
Total length:			79:23

iTunes Bonus Tracks
No.	Title	Length
20.	"Holla"	3:54
21.	"Da Block Goin Ham" (featuring C-Bo)	3:35
22.	"Gwop Boy"	4:15
23.	"Meet the Mob" (featuring Lee Majors, Ampichino, Young Bossi and Matt Blaque)	4:19
Total length:		95:26

== Charts ==
Chart (2010)	Peak position
U.S. Billboard Top R&B/Hip-Hop Albums	55
