= Dru Down =

American rapper (born 1971)

- Born: Danyel Robinson; September 14, 1971 (age 55); East Oakland, California, U.S.
- Genres: Hip-hop, gangsta rap, G-funk
- Occupations: Rapper, actor
- Years active: 1993–present
- Labels: Relativity; C-Note

Danyel Robinson (born September 14, 1971), better known by his stage name Dru Down, is an American rapper and actor from Oakland, California. He is currently a member of The Regime, a collective of rappers that includes Yukmouth, Tech N9ne, Messy Marv, BG Bulletwound, Dorasel, Grant Rice, and Tha Realest.

== Early life ==
Danyel Robinson grew up in East Oakland, California, raised by his grandmother and step-father after having lost his mother at the age of three. In his early teens, Robinson discovered from his grandmother that his biological father was bassist and singer Bootsy Collins, Collins having met his mother at a show.

== Music career ==
=== Game and "Pimp of the Year" ===
Robinson began developing an interest in rap music in the late 1980s, and eventually began recording his own songs as Dru Down, releasing his debut album Fools from the Streets in 1993 to moderate success in the Bay Area. The local success of his album led to him being signed to Relativity Records, a Sony Music imprint to release his second album Explicit Game in 1994. The album spawned Dru Down's most successful single to date, "Pimp of the Year", which peaked at number 65 on the Billboard Hot 100. The single stayed on Billboard for 24 weeks.

=== 1996–2009: Can You Feel Me, acting and Pimpin' Phernelia ===
Dru Down's third album, Can You Feel Me, was released in 1996, and spawned a single of the same name that was a minor but commercial hit. It also featured Dru Down's first collaboration with his father, Bootsy Collins, which was followed by a guest appearance on Collins' album Fresh Outta 'P' University. One of the album's songs, Mista Busta addresses Dru Down's then-ongoing feud with fellow Bay Area rapper Too Short, and serves as a diss track towards Too Short. The album peaked at #54 on the Billboard 200, and was critically praised, receiving a 4/5 star rating from Allmusic. That same year, Dru Down began his acting career, appearing in the movie Original Gangstas as Kayo. He also appeared on the 2Pac song "All About You" from 2Pac's fourth studio album All Eyez on Me, where he performs the intro.

In 2001, he signed with Ruthless Records, but did not release any albums, instead releasing his fourth and fifth studio albums through American Recordings and C-Note Records, respectively.

=== 2010–present: Chronicles of a Pimp and The Regime ===
Currently, Dru Down is signed to rapper Yukmouth's Smoke-A-Lot Records and owns his own record label, Pimp On Records, where he released his 2010 album Chronicles of a Pimp. He also serves as a member of the hip-hop collective The Regime, a group led by Yukmouth. The group released their debut album, Dragon Gang in 2013.

== Legal issues ==
In 2013, Dru Down was sentenced to three years in the Santa Rita jail for driving under the influence and evading police, a violation of his probation for a prior driving offence. He was featured on an episode of Lockup on MSNBC.

== Discography ==
=== Studio albums ===
- Fools From The Streets (1993)
- Explicit Game (1994)
- Can You Feel Me (1996)
- Pimpin' Phernelia (2001)
- Gangsta Pimpin' (2002)
- Chronicles Of A Pimp (2010)
- GP No PC Lock Up (2018)
- Welcome 2 Dru’s World (2019)
- Livin’ Legend (God Willin’): Part 1 (2020)
- Livin’ Legend (God Willin’): Part 2 (2021)

=== Collaboration albums ===
- Cash Me Out (with Lee Majors) (2006)
- Dragon Gang (with The Regime) (2013)
- Vampire Musik: (The Wee Wee Hours) (with Mani Moe & Numbers Malone) (2022)
- Game Explicit (with DZ) (2026)

=== Compilation albums ===
- Dru Down's Greatest Hits (2006)
- Lost Tapes I (2008)
- Lost Tapes II (2008)
- Lost Tapes III (2008)
- Lost Tapes IV (2008)

=== Mixtapes ===
- Crack Muzic (Volume 1) (with Rahmean & Lee Majors) (2007)
- Crack Muzic (Volume 2) (with Rahmean & Lee Majors) (2007)
- New Crack City (with Rahmean & Lee Majors) (2009)

=== Singles ===
- "Pimp Of The Year" (1994)
- "Ice Cream Man" (featuring Luniz) (1994)
- "No One Loves You" (1995)
- "Can You Feel Me" (1996)
- "Baby Bubba" (featuring Bootsy Collins) (1997)
- "Hello" (featuring The Jacka) (2010)
- ”International Pimp” (2011)
- ”My 501’s” (2017)
- ”In The Ghetto” (2017)
- ”I’m In Jail” (2026)
- ”It’s Westcoast” (featuring Don Cisco & Young Life) (2026)

=== Guest appearances ===
Year	Title	Artist(s)	Album
1995	"Pimps, Playas & Hustlas"	Luniz feat. Dru Down & Richie Rich	Luniz - Operation Stackola
1995	"Put The Lead On Ya"	Luniz feat. Dru Down	Luniz - Operation Stackola
1995	"I Got 5 on It (Bay Ballas Remix)"	Luniz feat. Dru Down, Richie Rich, E-40, Shock G, Humpty Hump & Spice 1	Luniz - I Got 5 on It (Single)
1996	"All Bout U"	2Pac feat. Dru Down, Yaki Kadafi, Hussein Fatal, Nate Dogg, Snoop Dogg	2Pac - All Eyez on Me
1997	"I'm Busy (Off Dah Hook)"	Bootsy Collins feat. Dru Down	Bootsy Collins - Fresh Outta P University
1997	"Sliden"	Cobra feat. Dru Down, Knucklehead, Otis & Shug	Cobra - Playaz In Paradise
1997	"Pistols Blazin"	3X Krazy feat. Dru Down & Yukmouth	3X Krazy - Stackin' Chips
1997	"Cali Lifestyles"	N2Deep feat. Dru Down & PSD	N2Deep - The Golden State
1997	"Dirty Raps"	Luniz feat. Dru Down	Luniz - Bootlegs & B-Sides
1997	"911"	Luniz feat. Dru Down	Luniz - Bootlegs & B-Sides
1997	"Live Yo Life"	Luniz feat. Dru Down	Laylaw presents - The Lawhouse Experience
2000	"She's Paid"	AMG feat. Dru Down & Bosko	AMG - Bitch Betta Have My Money 2001
2000	"Pimpin', Playin', Hustlin'"	Boo Yaa T.R.I.B.E. feat. Dru Down, Knumskull & Byron "Blu" Mitchell	Boo Yaa T.R.I.B.E. - Mafia Lifestyle
2001	"Block Shit"	Yukmouth & Tha Gamblaz feat. Phats Bossalini, Dru Down, Mac Mall & Troopa	Yukmouth & Tha Gamblaz - Block Shit
2001	"I'm A Boss"	Daz Dillinger & JT the Bigga Figga feat. C-Bo, Yukmouth & Dru Down	Daz Dillinger & JT the Bigga Figga - Game for Sale
2002	"Closer Than Close"	Luniz feat. Dru Down	Luniz - Silver & Black
2002	"Fugitive (Armed & Dangerous)"	Luniz feat. Dru Down & Benjilino	Luniz - Silver & Black
2002	"I'm So Cool"	Yukmouth feat. Dru Down, Lil' Ron & Richie Rich	Yukmouth - United Ghettos of America
2002	"Neva"	Yukmouth feat. Big Bear & Dru Down	Yukmouth - United Ghettos of America
2003	"Pimp Dat Bitch"	Yukmouth feat. B-Legit & Dru Down	Yukmouth - Godzilla
2004	"Spin & Chop"	Yukmouth feat. Dru Down, Kieu & Nate Da Nut	Yukmouth - United Ghettos of America Vol. 2
2004	"United Ghettos Of America pt. 2"	Yukmouth feat. 151, C-Bo, Dru Down, Eastwood, Roscoe, Spice 1 & Tha Realest	Yukmouth - United Ghettos of America Vol. 2
2006	"Get Nasty"	Pretty Black feat. Dru Down, Husalah & Kazi	Pretty Black - Prince of the Streets
2006	"Mobsta's"	Pretty Black feat. Bleu Davinci, Dru Down & J-Diggs	Pretty Black - Prince of the Streets
2006	"We On"	Pretty Black feat. Dru Down & Mistah F.A.B.	Pretty Black - Prince of the Streets
2006	"Yada Wha"	Pretty Black feat. Dru Down, Monsta Ganjah & Young Dru	Pretty Black - Prince of the Streets
2006	"1st of the Month"	Yukmouth feat. Dru Down & Monsta Gunjah	Yukmouth & Messy Marv - 100 Racks
2007	"It's Pimpin'"	The Yay Boyz feat. Dru Down & Clyde Carson	The Yay Boyz - Nosebleed Muzik
2007	"My Bitches And Me"	The Yay Boyz feat. Dru Down	The Yay Boyz - Nosebleed Muzik
2007	"So Paid"	The Yay Boyz feat. Yukmouth & Dru Down	The Yay Boyz - Nosebleed Muzik
2007	"Wreckless"	The Yay Boyz feat. Dru Down	The Yay Boyz - Nosebleed Muzik
2007	"Eye Candy"	Yukmouth feat. Dru Down, Lee Majors, Pretty Black & Tuffy	Yukmouth - United Ghettos of America: Eye Candy
2008	"East Oakland"	Yukmouth feat. Bart, Beeda Weeda, The Delinquents, Dru Down, Kafani, Richie Rich, Tajai, The Team & Tuffy The Goon	Yukmouth - Million Dollar Mouthpiece
2008	"Pimpin'"	Mac Dre feat. Tuff Da Goon, Dru Down, Thizz Mob & Rydah J. Klyde	Mac Dre - Dre Area
2009	"Pimpin' 4 Real"	Yukmouth feat. Dru Down, Dyson & Mac Dre	Yukmouth - The West Coast Don
2009	"Hook Up, Cook Up"	Messy Marv feat. Dru Down	Messy Marv - Draped Up and Chipped Out, Vol. 4
2010	"Attention"	E-40 feat. Dru Down, Suga Free & Stompdown	E-40 - Revenue Retrievin': Night Shift
2010	"So Trill"	Yukmouth feat. Lil Hype & Dru Down	Yukmouth - Free at Last
2010	"Cheat'n Ass Lover"	Tha Dogg Pound feat. Soopafly, Nate Dogg & Dru Down	Tha Dogg Pound - 100 Wayz
2012	"Where U From"	Yukmouth, Rahmean, Stevie Joe, Clyde Carson, Philthy Rich	Half Baked
2012	"Airheads"	Blanco, Yukmouth, B-Legit, Richie Rich	Cookies 'n Cream
2013	"Wow Really"	Yukmouth feat. Lee Majors & Dru Down	Yukmouth - The Last Dragon
2013	"Back In the Trap"	Yukmouth feat. Boss Tone, Monsta, T-Lew, Kuzzo Fly, Rahmean & Dru Down	Yukmouth - The Last Dragon
2013	"It's a Mob Campaign"	Yukmouth feat. Dru Down, T-Lew, Rahmean, Kuzzo Fly & Lee Majors	Yukmouth - The Last Dragon
2013	"Why Ask Why"	Yukmouth feat. Lee Majors, Dru Down & Chop Black	Yukmouth - The Last Dragon
2013	"On Momz"	Yukmouth feat. Lee Majors, Rahmean, T-Lew & Dru Down	Yukmouth - The Last Dragon
2013	"Who Me"	Yukmouth & The Regime feat. Lee Majors, Dru Down, Rahmean & Ampichino	Yukmouth & The Regime - Dragon Gang
2013	"Bonified Husalah"	Yukmouth & The Regime feat. Lee Majors, Dru Down, Kuzzo Fly, T-Lew, Mosnta, BG Bulletwound & Chop Black	Yukmouth & The Regime - Dragon Gang
2013	"Rock n Roll"	Yukmouth & The Regime feat. Dru Down & Tech N9ne	Yukmouth & The Regime - Dragon Gang
2013	"Regime Terrorist"	Yukmouth & The Regime feat. Lee Majors, T-Lew, Chop Black, Dru Down, Kuzzo Fly & BG Bulletwound	Yukmouth & The Regime - Dragon Gang
2013	"All Nighters"	Yukmouth & The Regime feat. Kuzzo Fly, T-Lew, Dru Down, Boss Tone, Rahmean & Lee Majors	Yukmouth & The Regime - Dragon Gang
2013	"On Rubber Bands"	Lee Majors feat. Husalah, Breeze, Dru Down, Rahmean, Big Heazy & Young Jesus	G Slaps Radio Vol 4: Turkey Bags In My Louis Duffle
2014	"The Best of Me"	Boss Tone feat. Dru Down & ROC	Guns & Rose

== Filmography ==
- 1996 Original Gangstas as 'Kayo'
