= United Ghettos of America =

Soundtrack album by Yukmouth
- Released: July 16, 2002
- Recorded: 2001–2002
- Genres: Gangsta rap, West Coast hip hop
- Length: 77:43
- Labels: Smoke-a-Lot, Rap-A-Lot
- Producers: Yukmouth & J. Prince (exec.)

Yukmouth chronology
Block Shit (2001)	United Ghettos of America (2002)	Godzilla (2003)

Professional ratings
Review scores
Source	Rating
ugrap.de	link

United Ghettos of America is a soundtrack to accompany the DVD documentary by the same name released by rapper Yukmouth in 2002 on Smoke-a-Lot/Rap-A-Lot Records.

== Track listing ==
#	Title	Producer(s)	Performing Artist(s)	Time
01	"La Costra Nostra"		Daisy Villa, Yukmouth	02:35
02	"Dem Can't Win"		Gangsta Girl, Tah Tah, Yukmouth	04:06
03	"Welcome 2 Da Bay"		Luniz, Mac Dre, Messy Marv	04:35
04	"I'm So Cool"		Dru Down, Lil' Ron, Richie Rich, Yukmouth	04:41
05	"Top Thugg"		Yukmouth	04:06
06	"Da Lot"		Monsta Ganjah, Nyce, Yukmouth	04:10
07	"Desperado"		Young Noble, Yukmouth	03:30
08	"No Way"		Deidre Selene, Numskull, Yukmouth	04:31
09	"N Thugz We Trust"		Brotha Lynch Hung, Keak da Sneak, Yukmouth	04:40
10	"Fuck Friendz"		Mac Minister, Yukmouth	04:08
11	"Gunz N Rosez"		Bart, Mac Dre, Rida, Yukmouth	04:32
12	"Neva"		Big Bear, Dru Down, Yukmouth	03:28
13	"Datz Gangsta"		Monsta Ganjah, Nyce, Yukmouth	04:51
14	"Money, Murder & Sex"		Jazze Pha, Phats Bossi	05:37
15	"Dragon Style"		Daisy Villa, Louie Loc, Yukmouth	03:55
16	"So Quick, So Easy"		Deidre Selene, Numskull, Yukmouth	04:20
17	"We Getting It"		D-Don, Yukmouth	03:40
18	"United Ghettos Of America"		C-Bo, Cold 187um, Mad Lion, MC Eiht, Outlawz, Yukmouth	06:18
