= Thugged Out: The Albulation =

Studio album by Yukmouth
- Released: November 3, 1998
- Recorded: 1997–98
- Studios: Enterprise Studio (Burbank, CA); The Hippie House (Houston, TX)
- Genres: Hardcore hip hop; gangsta rap
- Length: 2:22:51
- Labels: Smoke-A-Lot; Rap-A-Lot
- Producers: J. Prince (exec.); 88-Keys; Don Juan; Mike Dean; Mr. Lee; Tone Capone

Yukmouth chronology
Thugged Out: The Albulation (1998)	Thug Lord: The New Testament (2001)

Singles from Thugged Out: The Albulation
- 1. "Still Ballin'" Released: 1998

Professional ratings
Review scores
Source	Rating
AllMusic	3/5 stars
RapReviews	6/10
The Source	3.5/5 stars

Thugged Out: The Albulation is the debut solo studio album by American rapper Yukmouth. It was released as double album on November 3, 1998, via Rap-A-Lot Records. The recording sessions took place at Enterprise Studio in Burbank and at the Hippie House in Houston. The production was handled by Mike Dean, Mr. Lee, Don Juan, Tone Capone and Keith "88-Keys" Kinlow, with J. Prince serving as executive producer. It features guest appearances from his Regime groupmates Phats Bossilini, Tech N9ne, Madd Maxx and Poppa LQ; Luniz partner Numskull; West Coast hip hop acts MC Ren, Outlawz and Tha Dogg Pound; and several labelmates from Rap-A-Lot roster, such as the 5th Ward Boyz, DMG, Do or Die, Scarface and Willie D, as well as Fa Sho, Big Lurch, Tela and Val Young among others. The album peaked at number 40 on the Billboard 200 and at number 8 on the Billboard Top R&B/Hip-Hop Albums in the United States.

Along with a 2Pac-dedicated promotional single, a music video was released for the song "Still Ballin'". The video, featuring cameo appearances by the Outlawz, Tech N9ne and Shock G, was produced by Fifth Gear Ent. and directed by Eeinna Brighton-Akers, the first female director out of Hype Williams' Big Dog Films. The track "It's In My Blood Part II" is a sequel song to "In My Blood" performed by DMG, Yukmouth and Big Mike off of Scarface's My Homies, which was released seven months before this album.

== Track listing ==
Disc 1
No.	Title	Writer(s)	Producer(s)	Length
1.	"Godzilla"	Jerold Ellis; Anthony Gilmour	Tone Capone	3:43
2.	"Do Yo Thug Thang" (featuring Outlawz)	Ellis; Mutah Beale; Rufus Cooper; Malcolm Greenridge; Leroy Williams	Mr. Lee	5:24
3.	"City of Dope"	Ellis; Michael Dean; Gilmour	Mike Dean; Tone Capone	5:23
4.	"Thugged Out" (featuring The Regime)	Ellis; Aaron Yates; Keith Walker; L. Bankoudagba; Kenneth Green; Dean	Mike Dean	5:24
5.	"Ridaz" (featuring DMG and G Mone)	Ellis; Harold Armstrong; Gary Paul Talley; D. Cayson	Don Juan	4:25
6.	"Stallion" (featuring MC Ren and Tech N9ne)	Ellis; Lorenzo Patterson; Yates; Cayson	Don Juan	6:32
7.	"Father Like Son"	Ellis; Williams	Mr. Lee	4:36
8.	"Hater"			1:29
9.	"U Love 2 Hate"	Ellis; Dean	Mike Dean	4:07
10.	"Ice Cream Man" (featuring the 5th Ward Boyz and Fa Sho)	Ellis; Eric Taylor; Andre Barnes; Richard Nash; C. Phillips; B. Phillips; Dean	Mike Dean	4:22
11.	"It's in My Blood, Pt. 2" (featuring DMG)	Ellis; Armstrong; Dean	Mike Dean	4:25
12.	"Still Ballin'" (featuring Outlawz)	Ellis; Beale; R. Cooper; Greenridge; Dean; George Clinton; William Collins; Gary Cooper	Mike Dean	4:53
13.	"Revelationz"	Ellis; Dean; Gilmour	Mike Dean; Tone Capone	5:33
14.	"Rolex Rulez" (featuring Phats Bossi)	Ellis; Cayson	Don Juan	3:43

Disc 2
No.	Title	Writer(s)	Producer(s)	Length
1.	"Sad Millionaire" (featuring Phats Bossi, Fa Sho and Big Lurch)	Ellis; Bankoudagba; C. Phillips; B. Phillips; Williams	Mr. Lee	4:24
2.	"The Ballers Feud" (featuring Numskull and Kastro)	Ellis; Garrick Husbands; Dean	Mike Dean	4:47
3.	"Pop da Collar" (featuring Fa Sho)	Ellis; C. Phillips; B. Phillips; Williams	Mr. Lee	5:16
4.	"My Buddy" (featuring Daz Dillinger, Kurupt and Numskull)	Ellis; Delmar Arnaud; Ricardo Brown; Husbands; Dean; Williams	Mike Dean; Mr. Lee	4:50
5.	"Extortion" (featuring Phats Bossi)	Ellis; Bankoudagba; Williams	Mr. Lee	4:25
6.	"Menage a Trois" (featuring Tela and Kira)	Ellis; Winston Rogers; Dean; Melissa Elliott; Timothy Mosley	Mike Dean	5:02
7.	"Falling" (featuring Do or Die)	Ellis; Anthony Round; Darnell Smith; Dennis Round; Williams	Mr. Lee	5:08
8.	"Mackin vs. Pimpin'"	Ellis; Dean	Mike Dean	4:38
9.	"Gangsta Bitch" (featuring Fa Sho and Val Young)	Ellis; C. Phillips; B. Phillips; Dean; Gilmour	Mike Dean; Tone Capone	3:17
10.	"Rap-A-Lot Mafia" (featuring J. Prince, Geto Boys, Ghetto Twiinz, Facemob, 5th Ward Boyz and Snypaz)	Ellis; James Prince; Brad Jordan; William Dennis; T. Jupiter; T. Edwards; Armstrong; Taylor; Barnes; Nash; Jean Dorcy; Dante Miller; Iren Moore; Charles Paxton; Dean; Keith Kinlow	Mike Dean; 88-Keys	6:32
11.	"Sacrifice My Life" (featuring Kuirshan)	Ellis; Williams	Mr. Lee	4:32
12.	"Baller Mode"	Ellis; Cayson	Don Juan	4:51
13.	"Bumbell" (featuring Tech N9ne)	Ellis; Yates; Dean	Mike Dean	4:55
14.	"Secret Indictment"	Ellis; Dean; Williams	Mike Dean; Mr. Lee	4:14
Total length:				2:22:51

== Personnel ==
- Jerold "Yukmouth" Ellis – main artist
- Mutah Napoleon" Beale – featured artist (tracks: 2, 12)
- Rufus "Young Noble" Cooper III – featured artist (tracks: 2, 12)
- Malcolm "E.D.I." Greenridge – featured artist (tracks: 2, 12)
- Aaron "Tech N9ne" Yates – featured artist (tracks: 4, 6, 27)
- Keith "Madd Maxx" Walker – featured artist (track 4)
- Late "Phats Bossi" Bankoudagba – featured artist (tracks: 4, 14, 15, 19)
- Kenneth "Poppa LQ" Green – featured artist (track 4)
- Harold "DMG" Armstrong – featured artist (tracks: 5, 11, 24)
- Gary Paul "G Mone" Talley – featured artist (track 5)
- Lorenzo "MC Ren" Patterson – featured artist (track 6)
- Andre "007" Barnes – featured artist (tracks: 10, 24)
- Eric "E-Rock" Taylor – featured artist (tracks: 10, 24)
- Richard "Lo Life" Nash – featured artist (tracks: 10, 24)
- C. Phillips – featured artist (tracks: 10, 15, 17, 23)
- B. Phillips – featured artist (tracks: 10, 15, 17, 23)
- Antron "Big Lurch" Singleton – featured artist (track 15)
- Garrick "Numskull" Husbands – featured artist (tracks: 16, 18)
- Katari "Kastro" Cox – featured artist (track 16)
- Delmar "Daz Dillinger" Arnaud – featured artist (track 18)
- Ricardo "Kurupt" Brown – featured artist (track 18)
- Winston "Tela" Rogers III – featured artist (track 20)
- Kira – featured artist (track 20)
- Anthony "N.A.R.D" Round – featured artist (track 21)
- Darnell "Belo Zero" Smith – featured artist (track 21)
- Dennis "AK47" Round – featured artist (track 21)
- Val Young – featured artist (track 23)
- James "J. Prince" Smith – featured artist (track 24), executive producer
- Brad "Scarface" Jordan – featured artist (track 24)
- William "Willie D" Dennis – featured artist (track 24)
- T. Jupiter – featured artist (track 24)
- T. Edwards – featured artist (track 24)
- Jean Dorcy – featured artist (track 24)
- Dante Miller – featured artist (track 24)
- Iren "2-4" Moore – featured artist (track 24)
- Charles "Chilla" Paxton – featured artist (track 24)
- Kuirshan – featured artist (track 25)
- Anthony "Tone Capone" Gilmour – producer (tracks: 1, 3, 13, 23)
- Leroy "Mr. Lee" Williams – producer (tracks: 2, 7, 15, 17–19, 21, 25, 28), engineering
- Michael "Mike" Dean – producer (tracks: 3, 4, 9–13, 16, 18, 20, 22–24, 27, 28), engineering, mixing, mastering
- D. "Don Juan" Cayson – producer (tracks: 5, 6, 14, 26)
- Keith "88-Keys" Kinlow – producer (track 24)
- Micah Harrison – engineering
- Anzel "Red Boy" Jennings – production coordinator
- Mario "Rico" Allen – production coordinator
- Tony "Big Chief" Randle – production supervisor
- Artwerkz – layout design
- Pen & Pixel – photography design

== Charts ==
Chart (1999)	Peak position
US Billboard 200	40
US Top R&B/Hip-Hop Albums (Billboard)	8

== Certifications ==
Region	Certification	Certified units/sales
United States (RIAA)	Gold	500,000^{^}
^{^} Shipments figures based on certification alone.
