= Drought Season 2 =

Studio album by Berner & The Jacka
- Released: November 17, 2009
- Genre: Hip hop
- Length: 1:01:53
- Label: SMC Recordings
- Producer: DNA Beats; Gennessee; Goblin; Pak Slap

Berner & The Jacka chronology
Tear Gas (2009)	Drought Season 2 (2009)	Blow (2009)

Drought Season 2 is a collaboration album between American rappers Berner & The Jacka, the second album of their Drought Season series. It did not match the success of the first volume, but it still peaked at #66 on the R&B/Hip-Hop Albums chart. The album includes guest appearances from Killa Tay & Messy Marv, among other artists.

Music videos have been filmed for the songs "Colder Blood" featuring Fam Syrk and "Traffickin'" featuring Lee Majors & Fed-X.

== Track listing ==
#	Title	length
1	Traffickin' (featuring Lee Majors & Fed-X)	4:34
2	17708 (featuring Joe Blow & Young Bossy)	3:57
3	Prey on the Weak (featuring Killa Tay)	4:50
4	Live By It, Die By It (featuring Joe Blow & Shoboat)	3:52
5	Zion (featuring Messy Marv)	4:00
6	Colder Blood (featuring Fam Syrk)	4:19
7	All I Know (featuring Ampichino)	3:28
8	Not tha Same (featuring Fed-X)	4:15
9	Ridin' High (featuring Joe Blow & Fam Syrk)	4:30
10	The World (featuring Ampichino)	3:41
11	Temper (featuring AP.9)	4:13
12	Ain't a Game (featuring Freeze)	4:43
13	O's (featuring Fed-X)	3:18
14	Murder Murder (featuring Freeze & Lee Majors)	3:32
15	Circles (featuring Cellski & Fed-X)	4:41
