= Explicit Game =

Studio album by Dru Down
- Released: September 6, 1994
- Recorded: 1992–1994
- Genre: Hip hop
- Label: Relativity Records
- Producers: Chris "C&H" Hicks; Keenan "The Maestro" Foster; Ant Banks; Gino Blackwell; Robin Duhe; Tone Capone; JT the Bigga Figga; Dru Down (co.); Numskull (co.); Beeeach (co.); Pure Cane (co.)

Dru Down chronology
Fools From The Streets (1993)	Explicit Game (1994)	Can You Feel Me (1996)

Singles from Explicit Game
- 1. "Pimp of the Year" / "Ice Cream Man" Released: 1994

Professional ratings
Review scores
Source	Rating
AllMusic	3/5 stars

Explicit Game is the second studio album by American rapper Dru Down, his first for Relativity Records, and his first to make the billboard charts. Essentially a re-release of his 1993 debut album, Fools from the Streets, the album features similar cover art, a re-ordered track list, and a few new tracks. Explicit Game made it to 46 on the Top R&B/Hip-Hop Albums chart and 31 on the Top Heatseekers chart. In addition to the album charting, a single entitled "Pimp of the Year" made it to 65 on the Billboard Top 100 and 14 on the Hot Rap Tracks.

== Track listing ==
1. "Pimp of the Year" – 4:14
2. "Ice Cream Man" (featuring Luniz) – 5:18
3. "Rescue 911" (featuring Yukmouth) – 6:37
4. "Realer Than Real" – 4:29
5. "Rigged" (featuring Luniz) – 4:21
6. "Bad Boys" (featuring JT the Bigga Figga) – 5:40
7. "Should Have Said So" – 6:13
8. "Talkin' Shit" – 4:45
9. "Ain't No Stoppin'" – 3:40
10. "Hoo Ride" (featuring Luniz) – 4:54
11. "Call Me Dru Down" – 3:38
12. "No One Loves You" (featuring Yukmouth) – 4:00
13. "Talk How You Feel" (featuring Numskull) – 3:45
14. "Fools from the Streets" (featuring Luniz) – 5:11
15. "Bonus Track" (featuring Luniz) – 4:38

== Charts ==
Chart (1994–95)	Peak position
US Top R&B/Hip-Hop Albums (Billboard)	46
US Heatseekers Albums (Billboard)	31
