= Tear Gas (album) =

Studio album by the Jacka
- Released: June 16, 2009
- Recorded: 2006–2009
- Studio: 17 Hertz Recording Studio (Hayward, CA); Skyblaze Studios (Emeryville, CA)
- Genre: West Coast hip hop; hardcore hip hop; hyphy
- Length: 1:12:12
- Label: The Artist Records; SMC Recordings
- Producer: The Jacka (exec.); Bedrock; Cellski; Jeffro; Joe Millionaire; Kareem K; Lee Bannon; Lee Majors; M.G. The Producer; RobLo; Stagmata; The Inkredibles; Traxamillion

The Jacka chronology
Jack Of All Trades (2006)	Tear Gas (2009)	Broad Daylight (2009)

Singles from Tear Gas
- 1. "All Over Me" Released: April 8, 2008; 2. "Glamorous Lifestyle" Released: May 5, 2009

Tear Gas is the fourth studio album by American rapper the Jacka. It was released on June 16, 2009, through The Artist Records/SMC Recordings. Recording sessions took place at 17 Hertz Studios in Hayward and at Skyblaze Studios in Emeryville. Production was handled by M.G. The Producer, RobLo, Bedrock, Traxamillion, Cellski, Jeffro, Joe Millionaire, Kareem K, Lee Bannon, Lee Majors, Stagmata and The Inkredibles, with The Jacka serving as executive producer. It features guest appearances from Ampichino, Andre Nickatina, AP.9, Cellski, Cormega, Devin the Dude, Dubb 20, E-40, Freeway, J. Stalin, Jynx, Krondon, Masspike Miles, Matt Blaque, Mistah F.A.B., Mitchy Slick, Paul Wall, Phil da Agony, Planet Asia, Rydah J. Klyde, Sky Balla and Zion I. The album debuted at number 93 on the US Billboard 200, with 5,800 copies sold in its first week of release.

The album had two singles: "Glamorous Lifestyle" with Andre Nickatina and "All Over Me" with Matt Blaque. An additional video was also made for the Freeway-assisted track "They Dont Know".

== Critical reception ==
Professional ratings
Review scores
Source	Rating
AllMusic	3.5/5 stars
HipHopDX	3/5
RapReviews	9/10
XXL	3/5 (L)

Pedro Hernandez of RapReviews wrote, "Tear Gas proves that The Jacka is here to stay. He can pick a dope beat, lay down a catchy hook, and keep the listener entertained for a whole album. Taking it a step further, Jacka manages to connect with the listener in ways most rappers can't. Those waiting for a final word need to wait no further, Tear Gas is dope. It was worth the wait." AllMusic's David Jeffries was critical of the album's layout and Jacka lacking "verbal punch" in his lyrics, but felt his "consistent rhymes and remarkable flow" allowed him to better portray "a confident, talented, and believable gangster" than on Jack of All Trades, concluding that: "Even if the guest list is big, Jacka is in command, and with Traxamillion, MG, and Roblo behind the boards, Tear Gas is a worthy trip through the more chilled-out sections of the Bay." Mitchell Hannah of HipHopDX said, "Although Tear Gas should inspire those unfamiliar with The Jacka to give him a listen, the Pittsburg native ultimately needs to revisit his critically acclaimed sophomore album The Jack Artist." Branden J. Peters of XXL commended Jacka for being able to deliver both "introspective block anthems" and "sex-filled rhetoric" jams, while critiquing that the album's "plethora of features" can be hit-or-miss throughout the tracklist, concluding that: "It's the disc's duality and Jacka's penchant for both prose and pop that, in the end, make Tear Gas the best of both worlds.

In 2022, Rolling Stone placed Tear Gas at number 196 on their list of the 200 Greatest Hip-Hop Albums Of All Time.

== Track listing ==
No.	Title	Producer(s)	Length
1.	"Summer" (featuring Rydah J. Klyde, Matt Blaque and Netta Brielle)	M.G. The Producer	3:49
2.	"Just a Celebrity" (featuring Sky Balla)	Joe Millionaire	3:57
3.	"Glamorous Lifestyle" (featuring Andre Nickatina)	Traxamillion	3:57
4.	"Greatest Alive" (featuring E-40, Mitchy Slick and Jynx)	RobLo	3:38
5.	"They Don't Know" (featuring Freeway)	RobLo	3:39
6.	"Dream" (featuring Ampichino and Zion I)	Bedrock	4:22
7.	"Won't Be Right" (featuring Cellski)	Cellski	4:12
8.	"Keep Callin'" (featuring Devin the Dude)	M.G. The Producer	4:09
9.	"Girls"	Traxamillion	3:43
10.	"Scared Money" (featuring Krondon and AP.9)	Stagmata	4:05
11.	"Get It In" (featuring Paul Wall and Masspike Miles)	The Inkredibles	3:34
12.	"Whats Your Zodiac" (featuring Phil Da Agony)	Lee Bannon	3:49
13.	"Dopest Forreal"	Lee Majors	4:04
14.	"Callin' My Name" (featuring Mistah F.A.B.)	Bedrock	3:42
15.	"What Happened to the World"	M.G. The Producer	3:56
16.	"The Movement" (featuring Planet Asia)	RobLo	3:28
17.	"Storm" (featuring Cormega)	Kareem K	3:07
18.	"Our Heroes" (featuring Dubb 20 and J. Stalin)	M.G. The Producer	3:30
19.	"All Over Me" (featuring Matt Blaque)	Jeffro	3:31
Total length:			1:12:12

== Personnel ==
- DJ Impereal – scratches (track 15)
- James Ward – mixing (tracks: 1, 4, 5, 7–13, 15–18)
- M.G. The Producer – mixing (tracks: 1, 8, 15, 18)
- Sultan "Traxamillion" Banks – mixing (tracks: 2, 9)
- Michael Denten – mixing (tracks: 3, 6), mastering
- "G-Man" Stan Keith – mixing (tracks: 14, 19)
- Joseph "Bedrock" Epperson – mixing (track 14)
- Sam Gamble – recording
- Dominick "The Jacka" Newton – executive producer
- "The Original" Photo Doctor Graphics – art direction, design, photography

== Charts ==
Chart (2009)	Peak position
US Billboard 200	93
US Top R&B/Hip-Hop Albums (Billboard)	12
US Tastemakers (Billboard)	2
