= Obey (surname) =

Obey is a surname. Notable people with the surname include:

- André Obey (1892–1975), French playwright and writer
- Dave Obey (born 1938), American lobbyist and politician
- Ebenezer Obey (born 1942), Nigerian musician
- Pattie Obey, American choreographer
- Wallace Obey (born 1961), Liberian sprinter
