= Pimp of the Year (song) =

1994 single by Dru Down

Single by Dru Down

from the album Explicit Game
- Released: 1994
- Genre: West Coast hip hop
- Length: 4:14
- Label: Relativity
- Songwriters: Danyel Robinson; A. Moon; T. Thomas
- Producer: Ant Banks

Dru Down singles chronology
"Pimp of the Year" (1994)	"Ice Cream Man" (1994)

Music video
- "Pimp of the Year" on YouTube

"Pimp of the Year" (edited for radio as "Mack of the Year") is the debut single by American rapper Dru Down, released in 1994 as the lead single from his second studio album, Explicit Game (1994). Produced by Ant Banks, it contains a sample of "Shorty the Pimp" by Don Julian and The Larks. It is Dru Down's most successful song, peaking at numbers 65 and 74 on the US Billboard Hot 100 and Cash Box Top 100.

== Background and content ==
Dru Down recorded the song at rapper Too Short's studio. The song was an instant hit in the Bay Area upon release, staying on the Billboard Hot 100 for 24 weeks. It has been considered a "pimp anthem". Due to the song's popularity, a radio-friendly version titled "Mack of the Year" was made.

== Critical reception ==
Jesse Taylor of Passion of the Weiss described that Dru Down's "hypnotizing" voice "effortlessly grinds through Ant Bank's track like a circular saw". Complex ranked the song at number 10 in their list "The 50 Greatest Bay Area Rap Songs".

== Charts ==
Chart (1994–1995)	Peak position
US Billboard Hot 100	65
US Cash Box Top 100	74
