= Million Dollar Mouthpiece =

Studio album by Yukmouth
- Released: February 12, 2008
- Recorded: 2007
- Genres: West Coast hip hop; gangsta rap
- Labels: Smoke-a-Lot; Rap-A-Lot; Asylum; Atlantic
- Producers: Mike Dean; Traxamillion; Young L; Nan Dogg; Baby-C-Style; Mr. Lee; Enigma; P. Killer Trackz; Cozmo; Droop-E; Scorp Dezel; Kadosha; S-Dog

Yukmouth chronology
| In Thugz We Trust (2004) | Million Dollar Mouthpiece (2008) | The West Coast Don (2009) |

Professional ratings
Review scores
| Source | Rating |
|---|---|
| Allmusic | 3/5 stars |
| RapReviews | 6.5/10 stars |

Million Dollar Mouthpiece is the fourth studio album by rapper Yukmouth, released February 12, 2008 on Rap-A-Lot, Smoke-a-Lot Records, Asylum Records and Atlantic Records. Shortly after this release, Yukmouth left Rap-A-Lot Records.

== Track listing ==
| No. | Title | Producer(s) | Length |
|---|---|---|---|
| 1. | "West Coast Don" | Mike Dean | 2:37 |
| 2. | "Drug Dealer" | Traxamillion | 4:10 |
| 3. | "Shine Like Me" | Young L | 4:44 |
| 4. | "Hey Boy" (featuring Matt Blaque) | | 3:24 |
| 5. | "My Turf" | Nan Dogg | 4:10 |
| 6. | "Wake They Game Up" (featuring Crooked I) | Baby-C-Style | 3:36 |
| 7. | "Hate Me" | | 4:14 |
| 8. | "Playboi" (featuring Danice "The Morning Star") | Mr. Lee | 4:30 |
| 9. | "Corner Store" (featuring Matt Blaque) | | 3:37 |
| 10. | "The Best Thing Goin'" (featuring Richie Rich, Too $hort, Danice "The Morning Star" & Devin The Dude) | Enigma | 4:22 |
| 11. | "I'm Doin' My Thang" | Traxamillion | 3:30 |
| 12. | "West Side" (featuring C-Bo & Glasses Malone) | P. Killer Trackz | 5:23 |
| 13. | "Star In The Sky" (featuring Devin The Dude) | Enigma | 5:22 |
| 14. | "Can't Sell Dope 4Eva" (featuring MC Eiht & Trae) | Cozmo | 4:23 |
| 15. | "East Oakland" (featuring Bart, Beeda Weeda, The Delinquents, Dru Down, Kafani, Richie Rich, Tajai, The Team & Tuffy The Goon) | Droop-E | 4:22 |
| 16. | "M.O.E. Money" | Mike Dean | 4:08 |
| 17. | "Make It Rain" | Scorp Dezel | 4:47 |
| 18. | "Mobsta Mobsta" (featuring Ampichino, Dorasel, Freeze, Monsta Gunjah, Tech N9ne & Tha Realest) | Kadosha; S-Dog | 6:04 |

== Chart positions ==
| Chart (2008) | Peak position |
|---|---|
| U.S. Billboard Top R&B/Hip-Hop Albums | 46 |
