= The Verdict (The Jacka album) =

Studio album by The Jacka
- Released: January 17, 2012
- Genre: Hip hop
- Length: 42:26
- Label: Siccness.net
- Producer: Jeffro; Vince V

The Jacka chronology
The Indictment (2011)	The Verdict (2012)	The Sentence (2012)

The Verdict is a street album by American rapper The Jacka released in 2012 and is the second of a tetralogy of albums, starting with The Indictment and ending with The Appeal.

== Critical reception ==
Allmusic gave the album gave the album 3.5/5 stars.

== Track listing ==
#	Title	length
1	The Verdict I	1:05
2	Everyday	3:36
3	Time Still Tickin' (featuring Lil Rue)	2:32
4	OMG (featuring J. Stalin)	2:47
5	The Verdict II	0:54
6	The Rain (featuring Smigg Dirtee & Vince V)	4:09
7	Lets It Go	3:38
8	Knock Her Down (featuring Smigg Dirtee & Lil Rue)	4:33
9	All Around the World (featuring J. Stalin)	3:44
10	Here We Are (featuring 12 Gauge Shotie)	5:49
11	They Need That Mob S**t (featuring Cellski & Stevie Joe)	3:58
12	The Verdict III	0:19
13	Imma King	5:22
