= Thug Lord: The New Testament =

Studio album by Yukmouth
- Released: March 27, 2001
- Recorded: 1999–2001
- Genres: West Coast hip hop; gangsta rap; hardcore hip hop
- Length: 1:04:28
- Label: Rap-A-Lot
- Producers: 7 Aurelius; Damon Elliott; L.T. Hutton; Mike Dean; Mr. Lee; P. Killer Trackz; Rick Rock

Yukmouth chronology
Thugged Out: The Albulation (1998)	Thug Lord: The New Testament (2001)	Godzilla (2003)

Professional ratings
Review scores
Source	Rating
AllMusic	1.5/5 stars
The Source	3/5 stars
XXL	M (2/5)

Thug Lord: The New Testament is the second solo studio album by American rapper Yukmouth. It was released on March 27, 2001 via Rap-A-Lot/Virgin Records. Production was handled by Mike Dean, 7 Aurelius, Mr. Lee, Damon Elliott, L.T. Hutton, P. Killer Trackz and Rick Rock, with J. Prince serving as executive producer. It Features guest appearances from C-Bo, Phats Bossi, CJ Mac, Kokane, Kool G Rap, Kurupt, Lil' Mo, Mac Minister, Mad Max, Nate Dogg, Outlawz, Poppa LQ and Tech N9ne. The album peaked at number 71 on the Billboard 200 and number 17 on the Top R&B/Hip-Hop Albums in the United States.

== Track listing ==
No.	Title	Writer(s)	Producer(s)	Length
1.	"Old Testament" (featuring Mac Minister)	Jerold Ellis; Andre Dow; Michael Dean	Mike Dean	1:08
2.	"Thug Lord"	Ellis; Marcus Vest	7 Aurelius	2:28
3.	"Oh Boy!"	Ellis; Lenton Terrell Hutton	L.T. Hutton	4:20
4.	"Clap Yo Hands"	Ellis; Damon Elliott	Damon Elliott	5:06
5.	"Hi Maintenance" (featuring Lil' Mo)	Ellis; Cynthia Loving; Dean	Mike Dean	4:41
6.	"Puffin' Lah"	Ellis; A. Fields	P. Killer Trackz	3:45
7.	"We Gone Ride" (featuring Outlawz)	Ellis; Bruce Washington; Mutah Beale; Malcolm Greenridge; Rufus Cooper; Ricardo Thomas	Rick Rock	5:33
8.	"Thug Money" (featuring Kool G Rap)	Ellis; Nathaniel Wilson; Vest; Curtis Mayfield	7 Aurelius	4:03
9.	"Do It Right" (featuring C-Bo and Phats Bossilini)	Ellis; Shawn Thomas; L. Bankovdagba; Dean	Mike Dean	4:29
10.	"World's Most Hated"	Ellis; Dean	Mike Dean	5:04
11.	"So Ignorant" (featuring Kurupt, Kokane and Nate Dogg)	Ellis; Ricardo Brown; Jerry Long; Nathaniel Hale; Leroy Williams	Mr. Lee	4:30
12.	"Ooh! Ooh!"	Ellis; L. Williams	Mr. Lee	4:00
13.	"Regime Killers 2001" (featuring Tech N9ne, Phats Bossilini, Governor Matic, Mad Max and Poppa LQ)	Ellis; Aaron Yates; Bankovdagba; A. Williams; K. Green; K. Walker; Dean	Mike Dean	6:12
14.	"Smile" (featuring C-Bo and CJ Mac)	Ellis; S. Thomas; Bryaan Ross; Dean	Mike Dean	3:42
15.	"New Testament" (Outro)	Ellis; Dean	Mike Dean	5:40
Total length:				1:04:28

== Charts ==
Chart (2001)	Peak position
US Billboard 200	71
US Top R&B/Hip-Hop Albums (Billboard)	17
