= Rydah J. Klyde =

American rapper

- Also known as: Ridah, Rydah
- Origin: Pittsburg, California, U.S.
- Genres: Gangsta rap, hyphy
- Years active: 1992–present
- Label: Thizz

Rydah J. Klyde is an American rapper from Pittsburg, California best known for his affiliation with the rap group Mob Figaz. Around 2002, Rydah signed a solo deal with Mac Dre's Thizz Entertainment label. In 2003, he released his album Tha Fly Gangsta. In addition to releasing many songs on numerous Thizz compilations, Rydah saw the release of three albums; the first was an album with friend Johnny Ca$h as the group Money Gang titled Bang fo Bread, another solo album titled What's Really Thizzin? and another group effort with Thizz affiliate Freako titled El Pueblo Children. In 2006, the Money Gang released a mixtape titled 2 Chain Gang Volume 1.

== Discography ==
=== Solo albums ===
- 2003: Tha Fly Gangsta
- 2005: What's Really Thizzin?
- 2007: Thizz Nation (Volume 9): Starring Rydah J. Klyde
- 2007: The Best Of Rydah J. Klyde
- 2009: Rated R
- 2013: Klyde Fi$her
- 2014: The Klyde Show: Street Album (Volume 1)
- 2017: The Tonite Show With Rydah J. Klyde (with DJ.Fresh)
- 2017: The Tonite Show (Instrumentals) With Rydah J. Klyde (with DJ.Fresh)
- 2018: Pueblo Esco (with DJ.Fresh)
- 2019: My Presence Is A Present
- 2026: Double R (with Roblo)

=== Group albums ===
- 1999: Mob Figaz - C-Bo's Mob Figaz
- 2003: Mob Figaz - Mob Figaz
- 2005: Money Gang - Bang Fo Bread
- 2005: Rydah J. Klyde & Freako - El Pueblo Children
- 2006: Money Gang - 2 Chain Gang (Volume 1)
- 2007: Money Gang - Thizz Nation (Volume 12): Starring Money Gang
- 2007: Rydah J. Klyde & Fed-X - Money Over Bitches
- 2007: Rydah J. Klyde, Fed-X, & The Jacka - Mob Trial 2
- 2011: Rydah J. Klyde & Pooh Sauce - The Classic
- 2014: Rydah J. Klyde & Lil Tae - Flexin’ & Finessin’
- 2014: Rydah J. Klyde & Meezilini - Rat Poison
- 2017: Rydah J. Klyde & Shill Macc - All White Party
- 2017: Rydah J. Klyde & Band$ - Favor For A Favor
- 2020: Rydah J. Klyde & Shill Macc - All Black Affair
- 2020: Rydah J. Klyde & Fidel Cashtro - Rat Poison 2

=== Compilations ===
- 2001: Mob Figaz Ridah Presents: D-Boyz Compilation
- 2002: Mob Figaz Ridah Presents: 90% Street 10% Rap
- 2002: Ridah Presents: Mob Figaz - The Comp
- 2003: Mob Figaz Ridah Presents: Thunder Knock (Volume 1)
- 2005: Mob Figaz Ridah Presents: D-Boyz II: The Compilation
- 2008: Rydah J. Klyde Presents: Power Movez (Volume 1)
- 2010: Rydah J. Klyde Presents: Fonzo In The MOB Is Back (Volume 1) San Francisco To Reno
- 2015: Rydah J. Klyde Presents: ReedCardo - Sell That Sh?t

== Guest appearances ==
Year	Song	Artist(s)	Album
2002	"Help Me" (featuring Freako, Rydah J. Klyde)	Mac Dre	Thizzelle Washington
2004	"It Ain't Funny" (featuring Rydah J. Klyde)	Mac Dre	The Game Is Thick, Vol. 2
2006	"Undaworld Ties" (featuring Rydah J. Klyde)	Keak da Sneak	Thizz Iz Allndadoe
2007	"Bottom Bitch" (featuring Rydah J. Klyde)	PSD, Keak da Sneak & Messy Marv	Da Bidness
2007	"I Won't If You Won't Tell" (featuring Rydah J. Klyde, Lil' Tre & Hook the Man)	Mac Dre	Starters in the Game
2008	"6-500" (featuring Rydah J. Klyde)	Mac Dre	Dre Day: July 5th 1970
2008	"Pimpin'" (featuring Tuff Da Goon, Dru Down, Thizz Mob & Rydah J. Klyde)	Mac Dre	Dre Area
2008	"Sideways" (featuring Rydah J. Klyde & Freako)	J-Diggs	Ghostride the Whip OST
2008	"Get My Money Up" (featuring Rydah J. Klyde)	AP.9	Mob Trial 3
2009	"Summer" (featuring Rydah J. Klyde)	The Jacka	Tear Gas
2010	"Real Ninja Shhh" (featuring Rydah J. Klyde)	The Jacka, Ampichino	Devilz Rejects 2: House of the Dead
2012	"New Beginning" (featuring Marvaless, Rydah J. Klyde & T-Nutty)	C-Bo	Orca
2015	"One Sound" (featuring Rydah J. Klyde)	Berner, The Jacka	Drought Season 3
2017	"Out There" (featuring Rydah J. Klyde)	Nef the Pharaoh	The Chang Project
2018	"C.R.E.A.M." (featuring Rydah J. Klyde, Fed-X & Husalah)	Street Knowledge	Checkin Ain't Cheatin
