= Smoke-a-Lot Records =

- Founded: 1998
- Founder: Yukmouth
- Distributors: Rap-a-Lot, Asylum
- Genre: Hip hop
- Country of origin: U.S.
- Official website: smokealotrecords.com

Smoke-a-Lot Records, distributed by Rap-a-Lot Records, is a record label founded and owned by rapper Yukmouth and manager Kat Gaynor. The name comes from Yukmouth's Luniz nickname, "Smoke-a-Lot". The label itself is home to artists including Luniz, Dru Down, Thug Lordz (Yukmouth & C-Bo), The Regime, and Yukmouth himself. It is also home to newcomers Ampichino, Nyce, Young Dru, and Marc Shyst. Attached to the label as in-house DJ is former Cali Untouchable DJ, DJ Fingaz.

== Discography ==
=== Studio albums ===
- 1998: Thugged Out: The Albulation (Yukmouth)
- 2001: Thug Lord: The New Testament (Yukmouth)
- 2002: Silver & Black (The Luniz)
- 2002: United Ghettos of America Vol. 1 (Yukmouth presents)
- 2003: Godzilla (Yukmouth)
- 2004: In Thugz We Trust (Thug Lordz)
- 2004: United Ghettos of America Vol. 2 (Yukmouth presents)
- 2008: Million Dollar Mouthpiece (Yukmouth)
- 2009: The West Coast Don (Yukmouth)
- 2010: Free at Last (Yukmouth)
- 2010: Thug Money (Thug Lordz)
- 2010: Thuggin' & Mobbin' (Yukmouth)
- 2012: Half Baked (Yukmouth)
- 2013: The Last Dragon (The Regime)
- 2013: Dragon Gang (The Regime)
- 2014: GAS (Grow And Sale) (Yukmouth)

=== Official mixtapes ===
- 2005: All Out War Vol. 1 (The Regime)
- 2005: All Out War Vol. 2 (The Regime)
- 2006: AK-47 Soundtrack to the Street' (Yukmouth presents Ampichino)
- 2006: Superheroes: Hot Az A Heata Vol. 2 (Yukmouth presents Young Skrilla)
- 2006: Million Dollar Game (Yukmouth)
- 2007: All Out War Vol. 3 (The Regime)
- 2007: The City of Dope Vol. 1 (Yukmouth)
- 2011: Like A Beast Vol. 3 (Faze)

== Artists ==
- Yukmouth
- Thug Lordz
- The Regime
- Jamal a.k.a. Mally G
- Luniz
- Faze
- Young Dru
- Lee Majors
- J-Hood
- SkrillaOnSet
- 1700ZI
- Skrill-Dilly/Yung Skrilla

== See also ==
- List of record labels
