= Obedience (disambiguation) =

Obedience is a person's tendency to yield to instructions from an authority figure.

Obedience may also refer to:

- Obedience, an educational film about the Milgram experiment on obedience to authority figures
- Obedience, a common name for the plant Maranta arundinacea
- Obedience, a common name for the plant Physostegia virginiana
- Obedience (album), an EP by Swedish black metal band Marduk, released in 2000

== See also ==
- Vow of obedience as an evangelical counsel
- Obedience training for dogs
- Obedience trial, a dog sport
