= Pattie Obey =

Pattie Obey is an American Jazz dance choreographer and a Jazz dance master teacher. In 2000 she was awarded the Jazz Dance World Congress Award due to her significant contribution to the world of Jazz Dance.

== Biography ==
Obey is a native of Chicago. She had early roots in performance: her father worked for the Chicago Lyric Opera and she had two aunts who were professional dancers. She started dancing at age three, and began to perform professionally in the 1970s with Gus Giordano Jazz Dance Chicago.

Obey was the first woman to teach at the Jazz Dance World Congress in 1992.
