= The Jacka =

American rapper (1977–2015)

Background information
- Also known as: Shaheed Akbar
- Born: Dominick Newton; August 12, 1977; Pittsburg, California, U.S.
- Died: February 2, 2015 (aged 37) Oakland, California, U.S.
- Genres: West Coast hip hop; gangsta rap
- Occupation: Rapper
- Years active: 1998–2015
- Labels: The Artist Records; Mob Figaz LLC; SMC Recordings; Town Records; Siccness.net
- Formerly of: Mob Figaz

Shaheed Akbar (born Dominick Newton; August 12, 1977 – February 2, 2015), better known by his stage name The Jacka, was an American rapper from Pittsburg, California. He began his career as part of the rap group Mob Figaz.

== Early life ==
Newton was born to 14-year-old parents and became the family breadwinner as a teenager, a role that landed him in prison for a year at age 18. He converted to Islam at a young age and changed his name to Shaheed Akbar.

== Career ==
Newton's career began with the Bay Area rap group Mob Figaz after the teenaged Newton and several friends were approached by established rap artist C-Bo in a record store and went to a recording studio that day. The guest rappers appeared on "Ride Til We Die," the opening track on C-Bo's 1998 album Til My Casket Drops. Their debut album, C-Bo's Mob Figaz, released in 1999 was a minor hit on the Billboard Hip Hop chart entering in at #63, doing fairly well selling 160,000 units. His first solo release The Jacka of the Mob Figaz in 2001 sold over 30,000 units. Jacka sold these units himself, in the Bay Area and shipping to one-stops across the country. Though great support came from the Bay Area, sixty percent of Jacka's sales came from outside of California. In 2005, The Jacka released his second solo album The Jack Artist but failed to chart. In 2009, The Jacka came out with his third solo album Tear Gas making it #93 on the Billboard chart. The Jacka's #1 song in his 2009 album Glamorous Lifestyle was an instant classic in the Bay Area. Prior to his death, he owned his own record label named The Artist Records.

== Death ==
On February 2, 2015, Newton was fatally shot by an unidentified gunman in Oakland on 94th Avenue and MacArthur Boulevard.

== Discography ==
=== Solo albums ===
- 2001: The Jacka of the Mob Figaz
- 2005: The Jack Artist
- 2006: Jack of All Trades
- 2008: The Street Album (U.S. R&B #80)
- 2009: Tear Gas (U.S. #93)
- 2010: Broad Daylight
- 2011: Flight Risk (U.S. R&B #70)
- 2014: What Happened to the World
- 2020: Murder Weapon

=== Solo mixtapes ===
- 2005: The Jacka: The Mixtape
- 2007: The Jacka Is the Dopest
- 2010: G-Slaps Radio Vol. 1
- 2011: We Mafia
- 2011: The Indictment
- 2012: The Verdict
- 2012: The Sentence
- 2013: The Appeal

=== Collaborative albums ===
==== With Mob Figaz ====
- 1999: C-Bo's Mob Figaz

With Mob Figaz alumni

- 2002: Camp Mob Figaz: The Street Soundtrack (with various)
- 2003: Mob Figaz (with various)
- 2005: 3 da Hard Way (with Husalah & Marvaless)
- 2006: Animal Planet (with Husalah)
- 2006: Mob Trial (with AP.9 & Husalah)
- 2006: Shower Posse Gang (with Husalah)
- 2007: Mob Trial 2 (with Fed-X & Rydah J. Klyde)
- 2008: Mob Trial 3 The Verdict (with AP.9 & Fed-X) U.S. R&B #91

==== With Ampichino ====
- 2007: Devilz Rejectz: 36 Zips
- 2010: Devilz Rejects 2: House of the Dead (U.S. R&B #83)
- 2018: Devilz Rejectz 3: American Horror Story

==== With Berner ====
- 2008: Drought Season (U.S. R&B #55)
- 2009: Drought Season 2 (U.S. R&B #66)
- 2012: Border Wars
- 2015: Drought Season 3

==== Notable collaborations ====
- 2009: The Price of Money (with 12 Gauge Shotie) U.S. R&B #88
- 2010: Neva Be The Same - 20 Bricks: Season One (with Laroo)
- 2010: My Middle Name Is Crime EP (with Andre Nickatina)
- 2012: The Tonite Show (with DJ Fresh)
- 2013: Never Be The Same: Season 2 - No Mercy (with Laroo)
- 2014: Highway Robbery (with Freeway)

==== Additional collaborations ====
- 2006: Explosive Mode 3: The Mob Gets Explosive (with Messy Marv, San Quinn & Husalah)
- 2008: Outbreak: The Epidemic (With Kel of the Western Conference)
- 2008: The Gobots (with Lee Majors)
- 2010: The Gobots 2: D-Boy Era (with Lee Majors)
- 2010: Jonestown (with Messy Marv & Blanco)
- 2012: Obey (with Blanco)
- 2012: 100 Lbs and Bricks of Bo (with Liqz and Joe Blow)
- 2013: Misfits (with Blanco)
- 2013: Game Over (with Blanco)
- 2013: Futuristic Mob (with Dubble-OO)
- 2013: Bullys Wit Fullys 4 (with Guce)
- 2013: Straight Drop (with M Dot 80)
- 2013: The Gobots 2.5 (with Lee Majors)
- 2013: Write My Wrongs (with Freeway)
- 2014: Risk Game (with M Dot 80)

2014: One (EP) (with San Quinn & The Hoodstarz)

- 2014: The Waiting Room (with Reign)
- 2015: Dr. Jacka & Mr. Hyde (with Mac Rell)

==== Compilations ====
- 2005: Str8 Out da Slums (with Lil Keke)
- 2005: Ghetto Gumbo Raw Uncut Vol. 1 (OST)
- 2008: Slappin In The Trunk Vol. 5 Starring The Jacka
- 2009: The Jacka Hosts And Presents B.A.R.S Awards
- 2010: The Dre Area Volume 2 Starring The Jacka
- 2011: The Jacka Presents Mobbin Thru The West Vol. 1
- 2011: Best of Frisco Street Show: The Jacka
- 2011: Retrial: Million Dollar Remix Series Vol. 1
- 2012: The A.R Street Album (with The Artist Records)

=== Singles ===
Single information
"Hey Girl" (feat. Kazi, Young Uzi)
- Released: 2001
- B-side: "From the Bay" (feat. Dee Dee)
- Album: Jacka of the Mob Figaz
"Barney (More Crime)"
- Released: 2005
- B-side: "Girls Say"
- Album: The Jack Artist
"Never Blink" (feat. J. Stalin, Dubb-20)
- Released: 2005
- Album: The Jack Artist
"All Over Me" (feat. Matt Blaque)
- Released: April 8, 2008
- B-side: "Shooterz" (feat. Fed-X, Joe Blow)
- Album: Tear Gas
"Glamorous Lifestyle" (feat. Andre Nickatina)
- Released: May 5, 2009
- Album: Tear Gas

== See also ==
- List of murdered hip hop musicians
- List of unsolved deaths
