= Ampichino =

American rapper and producer (born 1976)

- Born: Anthony Deon Hunt; 1976 (age 49–50); Akron, Ohio, U.S.
- Genres: Hip hop; hyphy; Mobb Music
- Occupations: Rapper; record producer
- Years active: 2002–present
- Labels: Smoke-a-Lot Records; Flam Flawless Records; Double F Records

Anthony Deon Hunt (born 1976), better known by his stage name Ampichino or Amp, is an American rapper and producer from Akron, Ohio. His 2002 single "Do the Damn Thang" featuring Yukmouth peaked at #15 on the Hot Rap Songs and Bubbling Under R&B/Hip-Hop Songs chart.

Ampichino is a member of the group the Regime and the collaborative effort Devilz Rejectz with The Jacka of Mob Figaz.

== Career ==
Ampichino joined Yukmouth's hip-hop collective the Regime in 2001. Ampichino has been on numerous national releases. He was also on the soundtrack to the movie Hostel. He has worked with many platinum producers such as Mike Mosely, Mike Dean, Rhythm D, and Mr. Lee.

== Discography ==
=== Studio albums ===
- Intergalactical (2002)
- Ak-47 (Soundtrack To The Streets) (2005)
- Mysery (2008)
- Dark Night (2008)
- Da Krazies (2010)
- Cop Heavy Gang (Going All In) (2011)
- Cop Heavy Gang 2 (Right Back, Ain't Cheatin’) (2012)
- Da Krazies 2 (2013)
- The Eulogy (2015)
- The Lost Sessions (2015)
- Featuring Ampichino (2015)
- Pack Money (2015)
- Chasin’ Chicken (2017)
- Lost Sessions 2 (2019)
- Quarantine (2020)
- Quarantine 2 (2021)
- Da Krazies 3 (The Pandemic) (2022)
- Chicken Today, Feathers Tomorrow (2025)

=== Collaborative albums ===
==== With The Jacka ====
- Devilz Rejectz: 36 Zipz (2007)
- Devilz Rejects 2: House Of The Dead (2010)
- Devilz Rejectz 3: American Horror Story (2018)

==== With Young Bossi ====
- Stock Xchange (2006)
- City Of G'z (2007)
- City Of G'z 2 (2010)
- Cop Heavy Gang (2011)
- Cop Heavy Gang 2 (2012)
- Cop Heavy Gang (Lost Work) (2016)
- Cop Heavy Gang 3 (Exit Out The Business) (2026)

==== With Berner ====
- Traffic (2009)
- Traffic 2 (Planes, Trains, Automobiles) (2010)
- The Best Of Traffic (2013)

==== With Shoboat ====
- Dead Presidents (2011)
- Dead Presidents 2 (2017)

==== With D-Rek ====
- Trill Shottaz (2012)

==== With P3 ====
- MOB2K15 (2015)
- MOB2K15 (Deluxe Version) (2015)

==== With Chey Dolla ====
- Dope Dealers Emporium (2016)

==== With Malvo ====
- Mobb Classicks (2016)
- The Usual Suspects (2017)

==== With King Locust ====
- The AK (2016)

==== With the Regime ====
- All Out War (Volume I) (2005)
- All Out War (Volume II) (2005)
- All Out War (Volume III) (2006)
- The Last Dragon (2013)
- Dragon Gang (2013)

==== With KJizzle ====
- Betrayal (2018)
- Betrayal (Deluxe) (2018)

==== With Interstate Fatz ====
- Interstate Amp (2018)

==== With Hoggy D ====
- War Dogs (2021)

==== With Rich The Factor ====
- Midwest Tygoons (2023)

==== With DZ ====
- Men Of Honor (2024)

==== With Feezi Cash ====
- Narco Terrorists (2026)
