= Husalah =

American rapper

- Born: James Ratliff; April 13, 1979 (age 47)
- Genres: Hip hop
- Occupation: Rapper
- Years active: 1995-present
- Labels: The Artist Records, Sumo Records

James "Husalah" Ratliff (born May 13, 1979), is an American rapper. He began his career with the Pittsburg group the Mob Figaz, whose first album, C-Bo's Mob Figaz, was released in 1999. Like his late close friend The Jacka, Husalah is a Muslim, and frequently references Islam in his lyrics. He has released three solo studio albums (Dope, Guns and Religion, Hustlin' Since the '80s, and The H), as well as numerous group projects.

== Career ==
Husalah began his career with the Pittsburg-based group Mob Figaz. Their first album, C-Bo's Mob Figaz, was released in 1999 and was a minor hit on the Billboard Hip Hop charts, entering in at #63. The album sold fairly well, selling 60,000 units. His first solo album, entitled Dope, Guns, and Religion, was released in 2006 and was one of the most highly anticipated Bay Area hip-hop albums of the time.

Husalah has collaborated with many respected and noteworthy rappers, including E-40, Too Short, Kool G Rap, Cormega, Paul Wall, Freeway, the late Mac Dre, Andre Nickatina, Matthew LeDin, Lil B The Based God, Yukmouth, Clyde Carson, and Roach Gigz, among others.

== Discography ==
=== Solo albums ===
==== Studio albums ====
- 2006: Dope, Guns & Religion
- 2007: Huslin Since Da 80's
- 2010: Tha Furly Ghost Volume 3
- 2018: H

=== Collaborative albums ===
==== With Mob Figaz ====
- 1999: C-Bo's Mob Figaz

==== With Mob Figaz alumni ====
- 2002: Camp Mob Figaz: The Street Soundtrack (with various)
- 2003: Mob Figaz
- 2005: 3 Da Hard Way (with The Jacka & Marvaless)
- 2006: Animal Planet (with The Jacka)
- 2006: Shower Posse Gang (with The Jacka)
- 2006: Mob Trial (with AP.9 & The Jacka)
- 2007: Without My 5 (with AP.9)

==== Additional collaborations ====
- 2007: Explosive Mode 3: The Mob Gets Explosive (with The Jacka, Messy Marv & San Quinn)
- 2008: The Tonka Boyz (with B-Luv) (R&B #57 / Heatseekers #49)
- 2014 Tortoise and the Hare (with Blanco & Kokane)

=== Guest appearances ===
- 2001. "Target Practice" (with The Jacka, Earl Haze, Kozi & Yukmouth) on (The Jacka Of The Mob Figaz)
- 2010. "Lightweight Jammin'" (with E-40, & Clyde Carson on (Revenue Retrievin': Day Shift)
- 2016. "This Goin' Up" (with E-40, & Turf Talk) on (The D-Boy Diary: Book 2)
