= Mob Figaz =

American hip hop group

- Origin: San Francisco Bay Area, California, U.S.
- Genres: West Coast hip hop, gangsta rap, mafioso rap
- Years active: 1997–present
- Labels: West Coast Mafia, Git Paid Entertainment
- Members: AP.9; Fed-X; Husalah; Rydah J. Klyde; The Jacka (deceased)

Mob Figaz is a Bay Area hip hop group formed by C-Bo in 1997. The members consist of Husalah, Rydah J. Klyde, and The Jacka from Pittsburg; Fed-X from Richmond; and AP.9 from Oakland, California.

Their first album, C-Bo's Mob Figaz, was a minor success, reaching #63 on Billboard's Top R&B Albums chart. On February 2, 2015, Mob Figaz member The Jacka was fatally shot by an unidentified gunman in Oakland.

== Discography ==
=== Studio albums ===
- 1999: C-Bo's Mob Figaz

=== Compilations ===
- 2003: Mob Figaz
- 2005: The Best of The Mob Figaz Vol. 1
- 2007: AP.9 Presents: The Life and Times Of the Mob Figaz
- 2008: The Best of The Mob Figaz Vol. 2

=== Alumni collaborations ===
- 2002: Camp Mob Figaz: The Street Soundtrack (with various)
- 2005: 17708 (MOB) (with AP.9 & Fed-X)
- 2005: 3 da Hard Way (with Husalah, The Jacka & Marvaless)
- 2006: Mob Trial (with AP.9, The Jacka & Husalah)
- 2006: Shower Posse (with Husalah & The Jacka)
- 2007: Money Over Bitches (with Rydah J. Klyde & Fed-X)
- 2007: Mob Trial 2 (with Fed-X, The Jacka & Rydah J. Klyde)
- 2008: Mob Trial 3: The Verdict (with The Jacka, AP.9 & Fed-X) U.S. R&B #91

=== Guest appearances ===
Year	Title	Artist(s)	Album
1998	"Ride Til' We Die"	C-Bo, 151	Til My Casket Drops
1998	"Real"	C-Bo	Til My Casket Drops
1998	"Big Gangsta"	C-Bo, Laroo, Lil Bo	Til My Casket Drops
1998	"You Created Me"	Lunasicc, 151, Killa Tay & C-Bo	A Million Words, A Million Dollars
1999	"Bad Boyz"	3X Krazy	Immortalized
1999	"Immortalize"	3X Krazy	Immortalized
1999	"All About Dollarz"	Agerman	Success Is the Best Revenge
2000	"Born Killaz"	C-Bo	Enemy of the State
2000	"Ghetto Desperatos"	Mr. Sandman	Quicksand
2001	"1,2,3"	B.A.	Block Report
2001	"Gangsta"	Big Lurch, Lil Ric, Laroo	Gangsta Rap Greatest Hits - Northwest Whoride
2002	"Intergalactical"	Chino Nino	Knockem Wit Game
2002	"War"	The Delinquents & Hittaz on Da Payroll	The Dominion Continues...
2002	"Last Dayz"	II Sicc, Blac, AP.9 & Fed-X	Talez from the Sicc
2003	"Sometimes"	C-Bo	West Side Ryders 3
2004	"Fedi's Theme"	Mac Dre	The Game Is Thick, Vol. 2
2005	"Rock Out"	Luni Coleone	The Narration
2005	"Sometimes I"	The Jacka	The Jack Artist
2005	"The Five"	RobLo	Movement Union
2006	"Wild Night"	Mac Dre	16 wit Dre, Vol. 2 & The Best of Mac Dre, Vol. 4
2010	"Goin' 4 Blood"	The Jacka	The Dre Area, Vol. 2
2018	"All my Enemies"	AP.9	94th n Jack
