= The Regime (group) =

American hip hop collective

- Also known as: The Smoke-A-Lot Regime; The Regime Dragon Gang
- Genres: Hip hop
- Years active: 1997–present
- Label: Smoke-a-Lot
- Members: Yukmouth; Tech N9ne; Marc Shyst; Jamal

The Regime (stylized as The ReGime) is an American hip hop collective and supergroup created by Yukmouth in 1997, which originally included fellow rappers Tech N9ne, Phats Bossi, Madmax, Poppa LQ, Dizzle Don and Govnormatic. Not long after the original formation, Gonzoe of rap group Kausion and Lil Ke also joined. The group is signed to Yukmouth's Smoke-A-Lot Records, and share that label's dragon logo.

Unlike most rap groups, the Regime's members are from different states and cities around the US. Besides guest appearances on numerous Yukmouth related projects, the group has released three mixtapes in the All Out War series and planned for their debut album to be titled Regime Dragon Gang.

== Group members ==
=== Current members ===
- Ampichino
- Basek
- BG Bulletwound
- Boss Tone
- Big Rae
- Bueno
- C-Bo
- Chase D.O.E.
- Chino Nino
- Digital Top Hat
- DJ Don
- DJ Fingaz
- Don Menace
- Dorasel
- Dru Down
- Freeze
- Gov Matic
- Grant Rice
- Jay R Jay
- K.P.
- Kuzzo Fly
- Kenny Kingpin
- Lee Majors
- Marc Shyst
- Messy Marv
- Monsta Ganjah
- Ms. Story
- P rodriguez
- Rahmean
- Slam Versatile
- Smiggz
- Tech N9ne
- The Reason
- The Fleet
- T-Lew
- Young Bossi
- Yukmouth
- Phats Bossalini
- Mad Maxx
- Lil Ke
- Regime Lo

=== Former members ===
- Tha Realest
- Don Stryke
- E-Blak
- J-Stone
- Gonzoe (deceased)
- Nyce
- Pretty Black (deceased)
- Yung Skrilla

== Discography ==
=== Studio albums ===
- Dragon Gang (2013)

=== Side projects ===
- Lil Ke & Mad Max – The Regime Presents Thugg Lordz (2001)

=== Mixtapes ===
- All Out War, Volume 1 (2005)
- All Out War, Volume 2 (2005)
- All Out War, Volume 3 (2006)
- The Last Dragon (2013)
