= Jive Records discography =

This article lists albums that were released or distributed by JIVE Records.

== 1980s ==
=== 1981 ===
- Tight Fit - Back to the 60's - JIVE HIP 1

=== 1982 ===
- A Flock of Seagulls - A Flock of Seagulls - JIVE HOP 201
- Tight Fit - Tight Fit - JIVE HIP 2
- Zinc - Street Level - JIVE HOP 202
- Willesden Dodgers - JIVE Rhythm Trax - JIVE HOP 203
- Various Artists - Dangerous Dance Music - JIVE HOP 204
- Q-Feel - Q-Feel - JIVE HOP 206
- Willesden Dodgers - More JIVE Rhythm Trax - JIVE HOP 207

=== 1983 ===
- A Flock of Seagulls - Listen (Zomba) - JIVE HIP 4
- Richard Jon Smith - Richard Jon Smith - JIVE HIP 5
- Willesden Dodgers - JIVE Scratch Trax - JIVE HIP 6
- The Comsat Angels - Land - JIVE HIP 8
- Various Artists - Turntable JIVE - JIVE HOP 208
- Roman Holliday - Cookin' on the Roof - JIVE HIP 9
- Whodini - Whodini - JIVE HIP 10

=== 1984 ===
- The Group - I Hear I See I Learn - JIVE HOP 209
- Various Artists - Breakdance Fever - JIVE HOP 210
- Billy Ocean - Suddenly - JIVE HIP 12
- A Flock of Seagulls - The Story of a Young Heart (JIVE/Arista) - JIVE HIP 14
- Mama's Boys - Mama's Boys - JIVE HIP 15
- Whodini - Escape - JIVE HIP 16
- Sonny Okosun - Which Way Nigeria? - JIVE HIP 18

=== 1985 ===
- Mama's Boys - Power and Passion - JIVE HIP 24
- Hugh Masekela - Waiting for the Rain - JIVE HIP 25
- Tangerine Dream - Le Parc - JIVE HIP 26
- Jazzy Jeff - On Fire - JIVE HIP 27
- Mark Shreeve - Legion - JIVE HIP 28
- The Comsat Angels - 7 Day Weekend - JIVE HIP 29
- Various Artists - Rap Attack - JIVE HOP 211
- Jonathan Butler - Introducing Jonathan Butler - JIVE HIP 31
- Various Artists - The Jewel of the Nile: Music From The Motion Picture Soundtrack- JIVE HIP 33

=== 1986 ===
- Billy Ocean - Love Zone - JIVE HIP 35
- Ruby Turner - Women Hold Up Half the Sky - JIVE HIP 36
- Precious Wilson - Precious Wilson - JIVE HIP 37
- Whodini - Back in Black - JIVE HIP 38
- Samantha Fox - Touch Me - JIVE HIP 39
- A Flock of Seagulls - Dream Come True -JIVE HIP 32
- A Flock Of Seagulls - The Best of A Flock of Seagulls - JIVE HIP 41
- Schoolly D - Schoolly D
- Schoolly D - Saturday Night! - The Album
- Kool Moe Dee - Kool Moe Dee - JIVE HIP 44
- Steady B - Bring the Beat Back - JIVE HIP 45

=== 1987 ===
- Kool Moe Dee - How Ya Like Me Now HIP 53
- Whodini - Open Sesame
- Billy Ocean - Tear Down These Walls - JIVE HIP 57
- Ruby Turner - The Motown Songbook - JIVE HIP 58
- Glenn Jones - Glenn Jones
- DJ Jazzy Jeff & The Fresh Prince - Rock the House
- Steady B - What's My Name
- Samantha Fox - Samantha Fox - JIVE HIP 48
- The Cat Club - One Last Kiss (JIVE 155)

=== 1988 ===
- Too Short - Born to Mack
- DJ Jazzy Jeff and the Fresh Prince - He's the DJ, I'm the Rapper
- Schoolly D - Smoke Some Kill
- Steady B - Let the Hustlers Play
- Boogie Down Productions - By All Means Necessary
- Samantha Fox - I Wanna Have Some Fun - JIVE HIP 72
- Wee Papa Girl Rappers - The Beat, the Rhyme, the Noise - JIVE HIP 67

=== 1989 ===
- Too Short - Life Is... Too Short
- Schoolly D - Am I Black Enough for You?
- DJ Jazzy Jeff and the Fresh Prince - And in This Corner...
- Kool Moe Dee - Knowledge Is King
- Steady B - Going Steady
- Boogie Down Productions - Ghetto Music: The Blueprint of Hip Hop
- Ruby Turner - Paradise - JIVE HIP 89
- Tom Jones - At This Moment - TOMCD1

== 1990s ==
=== 1990 ===
- Boogie Down Productions - Edutainment
- D-Nice - Call Me D-Nice
- A Tribe Called Quest - People's Instinctive Travels and the Paths of Rhythm
- Too Short - Short Dog's in the House
- Hi-Five - Hi-Five
- Wee Papa Girl Rappers - Be Aware - JIVE HIP 103
- Kool Rock Jay and the DJ Slice - Tales from the Dark Side
- Kid Rock - Grits Sandwiches for Breakfast
- Mr. Lee - Get Busy
- Liz Torres - The Queen Is In The House

=== 1991 ===
- Samantha Fox - Just One Night
- Kool Moe Dee - Funke Funke Wisdom
- YOYOHONEY - Voodoo Soul
- DJ Jazzy Jeff & the Fresh Prince - Homebase
- A Tribe Called Quest - The Low End Theory
- Steady B - Steady B V
- D-Nice - To tha Rescue
- Boogie Down Productions - Live Hardcore Worldwide

=== 1992 ===
- R. Kelly and Public Announcement - Born into the 90's
- Hi-Five - Keep It Goin' On
- Too Short - Shorty the Pimp
- Mr. Lee - I Wanna Rock Right Now
- Fu-Schnickens - F.U. Don't Take It Personal
- Boogie Down Productions - Sex and Violence

=== 1993 ===
- R. Kelly - 12 Play
- Souls of Mischief - 93 'til Infinity
- A Tribe Called Quest - Midnight Marauders
- Billy Ocean - Time to Move On
- Too Short - Get in Where You Fit In
- Shaquille O'Neal - Shaq Diesel
- Spice 1 - 187 He Wrote
- Smooth - You Been Played
- DJ Jazzy Jeff and The Fresh Prince - Code Red
- Ant Banks - Sittin' on Somethin' Phat
- Angela Bofill - I Wanna Love Somebody
- KRS-One - Return of the Boom Bap
- Nuttin' Nyce - Down 4 Whateva
- Various Artists - Menace II Society (The Original Motion Picture Soundtrack)

=== 1994 ===
- Keith Murray - The Most Beautifullest Thing in This World
- Aaliyah - Age Ain't Nothing but a Number
- Shaquille O'Neal - Shaq Fu: Da Return
- Spice 1 - AmeriKKKa's Nightmare
- Casual - Fear Itself
- UGK - Super Tight
- Fu-Schnickens - Nervous Breakdown
- Ant Banks - The Big Badass
- Various Artists - A Low Down Dirty Shame Soundtrack (Jive/Hollywood)

=== 1995 ===
- E-40 - In a Major Way (Sick Wid It)
- Mystikal - Mind of Mystikal
- Insane Clown Posse - Riddle Box (Battery/Psychopathic)
- Rednex - Sex & Violins (Battery)
- R. Kelly - R. Kelly
- Souls of Mischief - No Man's Land
- Too Short - Cocktails
- Smooth - Smooth
- Ant Banks - Do or Die
- KRS-One - KRS-One

=== 1996 ===
- Backstreet Boys - Backstreet Boys
- E-40 - Tha Hall of Game (Sick Wid It)
- UGK - Ridin' Dirty
- A Tribe Called Quest - Beats, Rhymes and Life
- Too Short - Gettin' It (Album Number Ten)
- Keith Murray - Enigma

=== 1997 ===
- KRS-One - I Got Next
- Paradise Lost - One Second
- D-Shot - Six Figures
- Joe - All That I Am
- Soundtrack - Booty Call
- Mystikal - Unpredictable
- 2Pac - R U Still Down? (Remember Me)
- Hed PE - Hed PE
- Backstreet Boys - Backstreet's Back
- Backstreet Boys - Backstreet Boys

=== 1998 ===
- Spice 1 - Hits
- Celly Cel - "G" Filez
- E-40 - The Element of Surprise
- Mystikal - Ghetto Fabulous
- R. Kelly - R.
- A Tribe Called Quest - The Love Movement
- Ant Banks - Best of Ant Banks
- DJ Jazzy Jeff & the Fresh Prince - Greatest Hits
- Baby DC - School Dayz
- Too Short - Nationwide "Independence Day"

=== 1999 ===
- Too Short - Can't Stay Away
- Keith Murray - It's a Beautiful Thing
- Keith Murray - The Most Beautifullest Hits
- Spice 1 - Immortalized
- E-40 - Charlie Hustle: The Blueprint of a Self-Made Millionaire
- Celly Cel - Best of Celly Cel
- Various Artists - Sick Wid It's Greatest Hits
- Imajin - Imajin
- A Tribe Called Quest - The Anthology
- Britney Spears - ...Baby One More Time
- Backstreet Boys - Millennium
- Steps The Videos (29 November 1999) (As Seen On Sky Box Office In 31 October 1999 – The 31 October Manchester show was broadcast live on Sky Box Office and later released on the video "The Next Step Live", which shows some backstage footage of the show.)

== 2000s ==
=== 2000 ===
- *NSYNC - No Strings Attached
- Joe - My Name Is Joe
- Britney Spears - Oops!...I Did It Again
- Aaron Carter - Aaron's Party (Come Get It)
- R. Kelly - TP-2.com
- Backstreet Boys - Black & Blue
- Too Short - You Nasty
- Mystikal - Let's Get Ready
- E-40 - Loyalty And Betrayal
- Hed PE - Broke

=== 2001 ===
- *NSYNC - Celebrity
- Aaron Carter - Oh Aaron
- Backstreet Boys - The Hits: Chapter One
- Britney Spears - Britney
- Joe - Better Days
- Too Short - Chase The Cat
- Petey Pablo - Diary Of A Sinner: 1st Entry
- Mystikal - Tarantula

=== 2002 ===
- Richard Marx - Days in Avalon (Signal 21/JIVE) (Japanese release)
- Justin Timberlake - Justified (Debut) (JIVE)
- Aaron Carter- Another Earthquake!
- No Secrets - No Secrets
- Too Short - What's My Favorite Word?
- E-40 - The Ballitcian: Grit N Grind
- R. Kelly & Jay-Z - The Best of Both Worlds
- Jennifer Love Hewitt - BareNaked
- Robyn - Don't Stop the Music
- Nick Carter - Now or Never

=== 2003 ===
- R. Kelly - Chocolate Factory
- Britney Spears - In the Zone
- Joe - And Then...
- Too Short - Married to the Game
- E-40 - Breakin' News

=== 2004 ===
- JC Chasez - Schizophrenic (JIVE/Zomba)
- R. Kelly - Happy People/U Saved Me (JIVE/Zomba)
- Britney Spears - Greatest Hits: My Prerogative (JIVE/Zomba)
- Petey Pablo - Still Writing In My Diary: 2nd Entry

=== 2005 ===
- Backstreet Boys - Never Gone (JIVE/Zomba)
- R. Kelly - TP.3 Reloaded (JIVE/Zomba)
- *NSYNC - Greatest Hits
- Britney Spears - B in the Mix: The Remixes
- Chris Brown - Chris Brown (JIVE/Zomba)
- T-Pain - Rappa Ternt Sanga (Konvict Muzik/JIVE/Zomba)

=== 2006 ===
- Nick Lachey - What's Left of Me
- Justin Timberlake - FutureSex/LoveSounds
- Too Short - Blow the Whistle
- Too Short - Mack of the Century: Greatest Hits
- Aaron Carter - Come Get It: The Very Best of Aaron Carter
- Aaron Carter - 2 Good 2 B True
- Three Days Grace - One-X
- Clipse - Hell Hath No Fury (JIVE/Star Trak/Re-Up)
- Dirtie Blonde - Dirtie Blonde

=== 2007 ===
- Joe - Ain't Nothin' Like Me
- R. Kelly - Double Up
- T-Pain - Epiphany (Konvict Muzik/Nappy Boy/JIVE/Zomba)
- Britney Spears - Blackout (JIVE/Zomba)
- The Pack - Based Boys (JIVE/Zomba)
- Backstreet Boys - Unbreakable
- Chris Brown - Exclusive (JIVE/Zomba)
- Too Short - Get Off The Stage

=== 2008 ===
- Bullet for My Valentine - Scream Aim Fire (20-20/JIVE/Zomba)
- Lil Mama - VYP (Voice of the Young People) (Familiar Mindz/JIVE/Zomba)
- Raheem DeVaughn - Love Behind the Melody (JIVE/Zomba)
- Usher - Here I Stand (LaFace/JIVE/Zomba)
- Britney Spears - Circus (JIVE/Zomba)
- David Archuleta - David Archuleta (JIVE/Zomba)
- T-Pain - Thr33 Ringz (Konvict Muzik/Nappy Boy/JIVE/Zomba)

=== 2009 ===
- Ciara - Fantasy Ride (LaFace/JIVE)
- Jordin Sparks - Battlefield (JIVE/19/Zomba)
- David Archuleta - Christmas from the Heart (JIVE/Zomba)
- Britney Spears - The Singles Collection
- Britney Spears - The Singles Collection (Box Set) (JIVE/Zomba)
- Allison Iraheta - Just Like You (JIVE/Sony/19)
- Three Days Grace - Life Starts Now
- Kris Allen - Kris Allen
- Backstreet Boys - This Is Us
- R. Kelly - Untitled
- Chris Brown - Graffiti

== 2010s ==
=== 2010 ===
- Bullet for My Valentine - Fever
- Buddy Guy - Living Proof
- David Archuleta -The Other Side of Down (2010) (JIVE)
- R. Kelly - Love Letter
- Ciara - Basic Instinct (2010) (LaFace/JIVE)
- Usher - Versus (EP)/Raymond v. Raymond
- Braxton Langston-Chapman - My Apologies (Apologies)
- Backstreet Boys - Playlist: The Very Best of Backstreet Boys (JIVE/Legacy)
- K. Michelle - What's The 901?
- K. Michelle - For Colored Girls / Pre-Pain Medicine

=== 2011 ===
- Trai'D - Trai'DMark (HiTz Committee/JIVE)
- Chris Brown - F.A.M.E. (2011) (JIVE/Zomba)
- Britney Spears- Femme Fatale (JIVE/Zomba)
- NKOTBSB - NKOTBSB (Columbia/JIVE/Legacy)
- K. Michelle - Signed, Sealed & Delivered

== Unreleased albums ==
- Crustified Dibbs - Night of the Bloody Apes
- Britney Spears - The Original Doll
- No Secrets - Friends Forever
