= 1995 in hip-hop =

This article summarises the events, album releases, and album release dates in hip-hop for the year 1995.

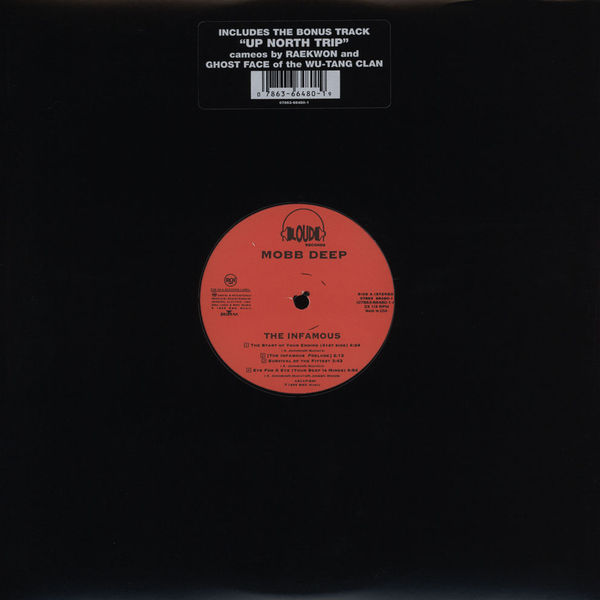
Mobb Deep's critically praised The Infamous was an influential album in both the East Coast and hardcore hip hop genres.

== Released albums ==
Release Date	Artist	Album
January 3	Various Artists	Higher Learning (soundtrack)
January 10	Smif-N-Wessun	Dah Shinin'
January 17	The Roots	Do You Want More?!!!??!
January 19	Tommy Wright III	Runnin-N-Gunnin
January 24	Marvaless	Just Marvaless
January 24	Subway	Good Times
January 24	Too Short	Cocktails
January 24	Various Artists	The Jerky Boys (soundtrack)
January 25	Various Artists	Project Blowed
February 7	Crime Boss	All in the Game
February 7	Juvenile	Being Myself
February 7	Master P	99 Ways to Die
February 14	South Central Cartel	Murder Squad Nationwide
February 21	DJ Quik	Safe + Sound
February 28	Brotha Lynch Hung	Season of da Siccness
February 28	The Nonce	World Ultimate
February 28	Tha Alkaholiks	Coast II Coast
February 28	Adina Howard	Do You Wanna Ride?
March 7	Nine	Nine Livez
March 7	Various Artists	The Walking Dead (soundtrack)
March 13	Double Vision	Keep You Eyes Open
March 14	2Pac	Me Against the World
March 14	E-40	In a Major Way
March 14	Kam	Made in America
March 14	Rottin Razkals	Rottin ta da Core
March 21	Channel Live	Station Identification
March 21	Various Artists	Bad Boys (soundtrack)
March 21	Various Artists	Pump Ya Fist (Hip Hop Inspired by the Black Panthers)
March 28	Big L	Lifestylez ov da Poor & Dangerous
March 28	King Tee	IV Life
March 28	Ol' Dirty Bastard	Return to the 36 Chambers: The Dirty Version
March 28	Dana Dane	Rollin' Wit Dana Dane
March 28	Various Artists	New Jersey Drive, Vol. 1
March 31	11/5	Fiendin' 4 tha Funk
April 11	Various Artists	Friday (soundtrack)
April 11	Various Artists	New Jersey Drive, Vol. 2
April 16	Schoolly D	Reservoir Dog
April 18	Lordz of Brooklyn	All in the Family
April 19	Dre Dog	I Hate You With a Passion
April 25	Eric B.	Eric B.
April 25	Mobb Deep	The Infamous
May 2	Masta Ace Incorporated	Sittin' on Chrome
May 9	Various Artists	Tales from the Hood (soundtrack)
May 23	Beastie Boys	Root Down EP
May 23	Mad CJ Mac	True Game
May 23	Jemini the Gifted One	Scars and Pain [EP]
May 30	Naughty by Nature	Poverty's Paradise
May 30	Double XX Posse	Ruff, Rugged & Raw
May 30	Show and A.G.	Goodfellas
May 30	Three 6 Mafia	Mystic Stylez
June 6	AMG	Ballin' Outta Control
June 15	C-Bo	Tales from the Crypt
June 20	The Dayton Family	What's on My Mind?
June 20	Grand Puba	2000
June 20	Mack 10	Mack 10
June 20	MC Breed	Big Baller
June 20	5th Ward Juvenilez	Deadly Groundz
June 20	Miilkbone	Da' Miilkrate
June 27	Skee-Lo	I Wish
June 27	Special Ed	Revelations
July 4	Prince Markie Dee	Love Daddy
July 4	Funkdoobiest	Brothas Doobie
July 4	Luniz	Operation Stackola
July 10	Scatman John	Scatman’s World
July 11	Bushwick Bill	Phantom of the Rapra
July 11	MC Luscious	Lollypop
July 11	Various Artists	Dangerous Minds (Soundtrack)
July 18	Guru	Jazzmatazz, Vol. 2: The New Reality
July 18	Kilo	Get this Party Started
July 21	DJ Krush	Meiso
July 25	Bone Thugs-n-Harmony	E. 1999 Eternal
July 25	Natas	Doubelievengod
July 25	Totally Insane	Backstreet Life
July 25	TRU	True
July 28	The B.G.'z	True Story
August 1	Raekwon	Only Built 4 Cuban Linx...
August 1	Poppa LQ	Your Entertainment, My Reality
August 1	Ray Luv	Forever Hustlin'
August 15	B.G. Knocc Out and Dresta	Real Brothas
August 15	Various Artists	The Show (soundtrack)
August 22	The Dove Shack	This Is the Shack
August 22	KeyKool & DJ Rhettmatic	Kozmonautz
August 22	Twinz	Conversation
August 25	Various Artists	Clockers (soundtrack)
August 29	Junior M.A.F.I.A.	Conspiracy
September 5	2 in a Room	World Party
September 12	E.S.G.	Sailin' Da South
September 12	MC Hammer	Inside Out
September 26	Count Bass D	Pre-Life Crisis
September 26	Damu Ridas	Damu Ridas
September 26	Das EFX	Hold It Down
September 26	Doug E. Fresh	Play
September 26	Kool G Rap	4,5,6
September 26	Nationwide Rip Ridaz	Nationwide Rip Ridaz
September 26	RBX	The RBX Files
October 3	P.M. Dawn	Jesus Wept
October 3	WC and the Maad Circle	Curb Servin'
October 10	AZ	Doe or Die
October 10	Jamal	Last Chance, No Breaks
October 10	KRS-One	KRS-One
October 10	Candyman	Phukk Watcha Goin' Thru
October 10	Ghetto Mafia	Full Blooded Niggaz
October 10	Kausion	South Central Los Skanless
October 10	Insane Clown Posse	Riddle Box
October 10	Menace Clan	Da Hood
October 10	Mystikal	Mind of Mystikal
October 10	Souls of Mischief	No Man's Land
October 24	Aceyalone	All Balls Don't Bounce
October 24	Ant Banks	Do or Die
October 24	Da Youngsta's	I'll Make U Famous
October 24	Fat Joe	Jealous One's Envy
October 24	Jayo Felony	Take a Ride
October 24	Frost	Smile Now, Die Later
October 24	Onyx	All We Got Iz Us
October 27	DJ Hollywood	Rarities
October 31	Cypress Hill	Cypress Hill III: Temples of Boom
October 31	Tha Dogg Pound	Dogg Food
October 31	Eightball & MJG	On Top of the World
October 31	Various Artists	Down South Hustlers: Bouncin' and Swingin'
November 7	The Click	Game Related
November 7	Coolio	Gangsta's Paradise
November 7	Erick Sermon	Double or Nothing
November 7	Goodie Mob	Soul Food
November 7	GZA	Liquid Swords
November 7	Poison Clan	Strait Zooism
November 7	Various Artists	One Million Strong
November 13	Beastie Boys	Aglio e Olio EP
November 14	The Pharcyde	Labcabincalifornia
November 21	The Dangerous Crew	Don't Try This at Home
November 21	C-Bo	The Best of C-Bo
November 21	Funkmaster Flex	The Mix Tape, Vol. 1
November 21	Group Home	Livin' Proof
November 21	Just-Ice	Kill the Rhythm (Like a Homicide)
November 21	8-Off	Wrap Your Lips Around This
November 21	LL Cool J	Mr. Smith
November 21	Mr. Doctor	Setripn' Bloccstyle
November 21	Mia X	Good Girl Gone Bad
November 21	Various Artists	The Hogg in Me
November 21	Three 6 Mafia	Live by Yo Rep
November 28	5th Ward Boyz	Rated G
November 28	Eazy-E	Eternal E
November 28	Gospel Gangstaz	Do or Die
November 28	Mic Geronimo	The Natural
December 5	Indo G and Lil' Blunt	Up in Smoke
December 5	Spice 1	1990-Sick
December 17	Ghetto Twiinz	Surrounded by Criminals
Unknown	Bomb Hip-Hop Records	Return of the DJ, Vol. 1
Unknown	Company Flow	Funcrusher
Unknown	M-Doc	M. Doc Wit Stevio: C'mon Getcha Groove On
Unknown	DJ Paul & Lord Infamous	Come with Me 2 Hell Part 2
Unknown	San Quinn	Live N Direct
Unknown	Kyper	Livin-N-XTC

== Highest-charting singles ==
Hip hop singles which charted in the Top 40 of the Billboard Hot 100 in 1995.
Title	Artist	Peak position
"Gangsta's Paradise"	Coolio featuring L.V.	1
"One More Chance"	The Notorious B.I.G. featuring Faith Evans & Mary J. Blige	2
"Hey Lover"	LL Cool J featuring Boyz II Men	3
"I'll Be There for You/You're All I Need to Get By"	Method Man featuring Mary J. Blige	3
"Big Poppa"	The Notorious B.I.G.	6
"I Got 5 on It"	Luniz featuring Michael Marshall	8
"Dear Mama"	2Pac	9
"Keep Their Heads Ringin'"	Dr. Dre	10
"Player's Anthem"	Junior M.A.F.I.A.	13
"How High"	Method Man & Redman	13
"I Wish"	Skee-Lo	13
"1st of tha Month"	Bone Thugs-n-Harmony	14
"Feel Me Flow"	Naughty by Nature	17
"Too Hot"	Coolio	24
"Sugar Hill"	AZ	25
"Give It 2 You"	Da Brat	26
"Ice Cream"	Raekwon	37
"I Seen a Man Die"	Scarface	37

== Highest first-week sales ==
List of top ten albums with the highest first-week home market sales of 1995
Number	Album	Artist	1st-week sales	1st-week position	Refs
1	E. 1999 Eternal	Bone Thugs-n-Harmony	307,000	1	Midwest Hip Hop
2	Dogg Food	Tha Dogg Pound	277,500	1	West Coast Hip Hop
3	Me Against the World	2Pac	240,000	1	West Coast Hip Hop
4	Cypress Hill III: Temples of Boom	Cypress Hill	142,000	3	West Coast Hip Hop
5	Only Built 4 Cuban Linx...	Raekwon	130,000	4	East Coast Hip Hop
6	Friday	Various Artists	123,000	1	West Coast Hip Hop
7	Cocktails	Too Short	101,000	6	West Coast Hip Hop
8	On Top of the World	Eightball & MJG	83,000	8	Southern Hip Hop
9	Return to the 36 Chambers: The Dirty Version	Ol' Dirty Bastard	81,000	7	East Coast Hip Hop
10	Mr. Smith	LL Cool J	80,000	20	East Coast Hip Hop

== See also ==
- Last article: 1994 in hip hop music
- Next article: 1996 in hip hop music
