= Big Thangs =

Compilation album by Ant Banks
- Released: July 8, 1997
- Recorded: 1996–1997
- Studio: Bad Ass Beat Lab (Oakland, CA)
- Genre: West Coast hip hop; gangsta rap
- Length: 49:56
- Label: Priority
- Producer: Ant Banks

Ant Banks chronology
Do or Die (1995)	Big Thangs (1997)	Derty Werk (1999)

Professional ratings
Review scores
Source	Rating
AllMusic	4/5 stars

Big Thangs is the first compilation album by American West Coast hip-hop rapper and record producer Ant Banks. It was released on July 8, 1997, via Priority Records. Recording sessions took place at Bad Ass Beat Lab in Oakland. Produced entirely by Ant Banks himself, it features guest appearances from J-Dubb, CJ Mac, Too $hort, 2Pac, Allfrumtha I, Audrian, Baby DC, Bad-N-Fluenz, B-Legit, Chuy Gomez, E-40, Ice Cube, Ice-T, K-Dee, King T, Mack 10, MC Ant, MC Breed, Mean Green, Rappin' 4-Tay, Slink Capone, Spice 1, WC, Otis & Shug, Stacy Hogg, and cameos from Coolio and Dr. Dre.

The album debuted at number 20 on the Billboard 200 and number 4 on the Top R&B/Hip-Hop Albums charts in the United States.

== Track listing ==
No.	Title	Writer(s)	Length
1.	"Intro"	Anthony Banks	2:06
2.	"Big Thangs" (featuring Too $hort and Ice Cube)	Banks; Todd Shaw; O'Shea Jackson	3:43
3.	"Coolin in the Luff" (featuring Chuey Gomez)		0:40
4.	"Can't Stop" (featuring E-40 and Mack 10)	Banks; Earl Stevens; Dedrick Rolison	4:25
5.	"West Riden'" (featuring King T and Spice 1)	Banks; Roger McBride; Robert Green	4:57
6.	"Hard Knox" (featuring J-Dubb and WC)	Banks; Leo Ramsey; William Calhoun	4:07
7.	"Gamblin' wit Ice T" (featuring Ice-T)		0:56
8.	"4 tha Hustlas" (featuring Too $hort, 2Pac and MC Breed)	Banks; Shaw; Tupac Shakur; Eric Breed	4:52
9.	"Time Is Tickin'" (featuring Bad-N-Fluenz)	Banks; Anthony Nelson; Carl Martin	4:15
10.	"Cutaluff" (featuring Slink Capone)	Banks; Gerald Johnson	1:09
11.	"Hoo-Ride Ant Banks" (featuring B-Legit, Mean Green, MC Ant and Baby DC)		1:26
12.	"Make Money" (featuring CJ Mac and K-Dee)	Banks; Bryaan Ross; Darrell Johnson	4:37
13.	"Playa Paraphernalia" (featuring J-Dubb and Rappin' 4-Tay)	Banks; Ramsey	4:12
14.	"Fien" (featuring AllFrumTha I)	Banks; Ryan Garner; Marcus Moore	4:08
15.	"You Want Me Back" (featuring Audrian, J-Dubb and CJ Mac)	Banks; Jo Jo; Stacy Hogg; Ramsey; Ross	3:54
16.	"Outro"		0:29
Total length:			49:56

Sample credits

- Track 1 contains an interpolation of "For the Love of Money" written by Kenneth Gamble, Leon Huff and Anthony Jackson.
- Track 2 contains an interpolation of "Summer Madness" written by Robert Bell, Ronald Bell, George Brown, Robert Mickens, Claydes Smith, Alton Taylor, Dennis Thomas and Ricky Westfield.

== Personnel ==
- Anthony "Ant" Banks – producer, recording & mixing (tracks: 1, 2, 4–6, 8–10, 12–15), arranger (track 10)
- Otis Cooper – background vocals (tracks: 1, 5, 6, 8, 9, 12)
- Rafael "Shugg" Howell – background vocals (tracks: 1, 5, 6, 8, 9, 12)
- Todd "Too $hort" Shaw – lead vocals (tracks: 2, 8)
- O'Shea "Ice Cube" Jackson – lead vocals (track 2)
- Earl "E-40" Stevens – lead vocals & vocal arranger (track 4)
- Dedrick "Mack 10" Rolison – lead vocals & vocal arranger (track 4)
- Roger "King Tee" McBride – lead vocals (track 5)
- Robert "Spice 1" Green – lead vocals (track 5)
- Leo "J-Dubb" Ramsey – lead vocals (tracks: 6, 13, 15)
- William "WC" Calhoun – lead vocals (track 6)
- Tupac "2Pac" Shakur – lead vocals (track 8)
- Eric Breed – lead vocals (track 8)
- Anthony "Ant Diddley Dog" Nelson – lead vocals (track 9)
- Carl "Mr. Ill" Martin – lead vocals (track 9)
- Gerald "Slink Capone" Johnson – lead vocals (track 10)
- Stacy Hogg – background vocals (track 10)
- Andre "Dr. Dre" Young – intro (track 10)
- Bryaan "CJ Mac" Ross – lead vocals (tracks: 12, 15)
- Darrell "K-Dee" Johnson – lead vocals (track 12)
- Anthony "Rappin' 4-Tay" Forté – lead vocals (track 13)
- Artis "Coolio" Ivey Jr. – intro (track 13)
- Ryan "Binky Mack" Garner – lead vocals (track 14)
- Marcus "Squeak Ru" Moore – lead vocals (track 14)
- Audrian – lead vocals (track 15)
- James "Tre" Rabb – guitar (tracks: 2, 3, 5, 12–14)
- Stuart "Shorty B" Jordan – guitar (track 8)
- Ramon "Pee-Wee" Gooden – guitar (track 15)
- Carlos Warlick – mixing (tracks: 1, 2, 4–6, 8–10, 12–15)
- Mark Chalecki – mastering
- Marvin Watkins – executive producer, A&R
- Art Shoji – art direction
- William Hames – photography

== Charts ==
=== Weekly charts ===
Chart (1997)	Peak position
US Billboard 200	20
US Top R&B/Hip-Hop Albums (Billboard)	4

=== Year-end charts ===
Chart (1997)	Position
US Top R&B/Hip-Hop Albums (Billboard)	98
