= Otis & Shug =

American rhythm and blues group

- Origin: Oakland, California, U.S.
- Genres: R&B, soul
- Years active: 1995–present
- Label: Interscope
- Members: Otis Cooper; Rafael Shugg Howell

Otis & Shug are an American singing duo from Oakland, California, with two members: Otis Cooper and Rafael "Shugg” Howell

== Discography ==
=== Studio albums ===
- We Can Do Whatever (2005)

=== Solo projects ===
- Otis Cooper – O. Cooper (2004)

=== Guest appearances ===
- 1994: "The Drunken Fool" (from the Ant Banks album The Big Badass)
- 1997: "Hard Knox", "4 tha Hustlas", "Time Is Tickin'" and "Make Money" (from the Ant Banks album Big Thangs)
- 1998: "360°" (from the Eightball album Lost)
- 1998: "Every Day is tha Weekend" and "Get It Crackin'" (from the Celly Cel album The G Filez)
- 1998: "Hope I Don't Go Back" and "Broccoli" (from the E-40 album The Element of Surprise)
- 1998: "I Know You Love Her" (from the Epic Records soundtrack Woo)
- 1999: "Kaviealstars" (from the 3X Krazy album Immortalized)
- 1999: "Haters" and "You Me & He" (from The Delinquents album Bosses Will Be Bosses)
- 1999: "Hood Ratz and Knuckleheads" (from the B-Legit album Hempin' Ain't Easy)
- 1999: "Out 2 Get Mo" and "Players Holiday" (from the T.W.D.Y. album Derty Werk)
- 1999: "Longevity" (from the Too Short album Can't Stay Away)
- 1999: "Seasoned" and "Earl That's Yo' Life" (from the E-40 album The Blueprint of a Self-Made Millionaire)
- 2000: "Blue Suits & Badges", "Never Sober", "In the Ghetto" and "Cali 4 Ni Yey" (from the T.W.D.Y. album Lead the Way)
- 2000: "Pop Ya Collar" (from the E-40 album Loyalty and Betrayal)
- 2014: "Family" (from the E-40 album Sharp On All 4 Corners: Corner 1)
