= Nationwide: Independence Day =

Compilation album by various artists
- Released: May 19, 1998
- Recorded: 1997–1998
- Genre: Hip-hop
- Length: 1:59:58
- Label: $hort; Jive
- Producer: CMT; Colin Wolfe; E-A-Ski; Flash Technology; Gerald Baillergeau; G-Mack; Jay Da Sinnusta; Jazze Pha; Lil' Jon; Mark Twayne; Mike D; Mr. Ran; Pretty Ken; Quint Black; Rob & Emperor Searcy; Sonny B; Spearhead X; Taj Mahal; Terry T; Victor Merritt; Anthony Dent

Too $hort chronology
Don't Try This at Home (1995)	Nationwide: Independence Day (1998)	Nationwide 2: Ghetto Pass (2000)

Professional ratings
Review scores
Source	Rating
AllMusic	3/5 stars
The Source	3.5/5 stars

Nationwide: Independence Day is a compilation album by American hip-hop record label $hort Records. It was released on May 19, 1998 via Jive Records. Production was handled by Quint Black, Terry T, CMT, Colin Wolfe, DJ Flash, E-A-Ski, Gerald Baillergeau, G-Mack, Jay Da Sinnusta, Jazze Pha, Lil' Jon, Mark Twayne, Mike D, Mr. Ran, Pretty Ken, Rob & Emperor Searcy, Sonny B, Spearhead X, Taj "Mahal" Tilghman, Victor Merritt and Anthony Dent. It features contributions from Too $hort, Badwayz, 38 Deep, Al Block, Baby DC, Big Zack, Casual, Dolla Will, Father Dom, George Clinton, G-Side, Jamal, Jayo Felony, Kat, Keith Murray, Lil' Jon & The East Side Boyz, Lyrical Giants, Mddl Fngz, Pimp C, Playa-Playa, Polyester Playas, Slink Capone, Sylk-E. Fyne, Trauma Black, Zu and Redman among others.

The compilation made it to number 38 on the Billboard 200 and number 7 on the Top R&B/Hip-Hop Albums charts in the United States. It eventually sold over 500,000 copies and was certified gold by the Recording Industry Association of America on July 28, 1998.

== Track listing ==
Disc 1
No.	Title	Producer(s)	Length
1.	"Short Dog/Hit 'Em Up" (performed by Too $hort)	Quint Black	4:17
2.	"Independence Day" (performed by Keith Murray and Too $hort)	Quint Black	4:15
3.	"Get Your Hustle On" (performed by Baby DC and Too $hort)	Taj Tilghman	4:30
4.	"Spread Your Love" (performed by Murda One)	DJ Flash	4:35
5.	"Abstract Hustle" (performed by 38 Deep and Kat)	Quint Black	4:47
6.	"When You See Me" (performed by G-Side)	Mr. Ran	3:57
7.	"All About It" (performed by Too $hort and Pimp C)	Colin Wolfe	7:38
8.	"Time After Time" (performed by Casual and Dolla Will)	Terry T	4:36
9.	"Are You Ready for This" (performed by Badwayz)	Quint Black	5:31
10.	"Lady Luv" (performed by Zu)		5:42
11.	"Wreckognize" (performed by Mddl Fngz)	Quint Black	4:15
12.	"Paper Chase" (performed by Al Block)	R.O.B.; Emperor Searcy	4:16
13.	"Playa Hatin' Hoes" (performed by Playa-Playa)	Jay Da Sinnusta	4:07

Disc 2
No.	Title	Producer(s)	Length
14.	"Pimpin' Ain't Easy" (performed by Polyester Playas)	G-Mack	4:30
15.	"Couldn't Be a Better Player" (performed by Lil' Jon & the East Side Boyz and Too $hort)	Lil' Jon	6:06
16.	"Don't Stop" (performed by Lyrical Giants)	Mark Twayne; Pretty Ken	4:20
17.	"Get All Your Change" (performed by Too $hort, Big Zack and Trauma Black)	Jazze Pha	4:23
18.	"Whateva Man (Remix)" (performed by Redman)	Dent	4:03
19.	"I Ain't Gonna Forget This" (performed by Badwayz and Jamal)	Quint Black	4:39
20.	"If I Wasn't High" (performed by Studd)	Quint Black	5:55
21.	"Hellbound" (performed by Slink Capone)	Mike D; Sonny B	4:12
22.	"Who Loves Ya" (performed by Jayo Felony)	E-A-Ski; CMT	4:08
23.	"Same Old Song" (performed by Father Dom)	Terry T	5:04
24.	"Keep It Real" (performed by Sylk-E. Fyne and Too $hort)	Gerald Baillergeau; Victor Merritt	4:02
25.	"Killa Team" (performed by Joe Riz and George Clinton)	Spearhead X	6:10
Total length:			1:59:58

Notes

- Track 1 features backing vocals from Murda One and Stud.
- Track 3 features backing vocals from Tabitha Duncan.
- Track 4 features backing vocals from Portia Jackson.
- Track 5 features backing vocals from Jazze Pha, Jeree Manning and Sonji Mickey.
- Track 10 features backing vocals from Kool-Ace.
- Track 13 features backing vocals from Lady Suge and MC Breed.
- Track 16 features backing vocals from Jamile Young.
- Track 22 features backing vocals from Allen Anthony and Kenni Ski.

== Charts ==
Chart (1998)	Peak position
US Billboard 200	38
US Top R&B/Hip-Hop Albums (Billboard)	7

== Certifications ==
Region	Certification	Certified units/sales
United States (RIAA)	Gold	500,000^{^}
^{^} Shipments figures based on certification alone.
