= Gettin' It (Album Number Ten) =

Studio album by Too Short
- Released: May 21, 1996
- Recorded: 1995–1996
- Genres: West Coast hip hop; gangsta rap; G-funk
- Length: 65:54
- Label: Jive
- Producers: L.A. Dre; Ant Banks; Colin Wolfe; MC Breed; Shorty B; Spearhead X

Too Short chronology
Cocktails (1995)	Gettin' It (Album Number Ten) (1996)	Can't Stay Away (1999)

Singles from Gettin' It (Album Number Ten)
- 1. "Gettin' It" Released: March 18, 1996; 2. "Never Talk Down" Released: September 28, 1996

Gettin' It (Album Number Ten) is the tenth studio album by American rapper Too Short. It was released on May 21, 1996, by Jive Records, making it his seventh album on the label. It was announced and marketed as his "final album", although his career would continue with the release of his aptly-titled eleventh album, Can't Stay Away (1999). The album was supported by the lead single of the same name (featuring Parliament-Funkadelic), which served as its first track.

Gettin' It (Album Number Ten)'s production and lyrical content reflect the domination of gangsta rap and G-funk throughout the West Coast, and narrowly strays away from the sexually explicit subject matter heard on its predecessor, Cocktails (1995). It peaked at number three on the Billboard 200 and remains his highest-charting album, also becoming Too Short's third number-one album on the Top R&B Albums chart. On July 26, 1996, it received platinum certification by the Recording Industry Association of America (RIAA).

== Critical reception ==
Professional ratings
Review scores
Source	Rating
AllMusic	2.5/5 stars
Pitchfork	8.3/10
The Source	3.5/5 stars

Stephen Thomas Erlewine of AllMusic wrote that as Too Short had announced this as his "retirement album", "he picked the perfect moment to drop out of the hip-hop business—as the album shows, he's already beginning to border on self-parody" as it has too much "filler" and "tired boasts and worn-out beats". In 2023, Pitchfork called it Too Short's "imperial '90s peak" as well as "a slick and funky landmark of pimp rap", summarizing it as "a grand, reflective finale where $hort grapples with his rap game mortality and legacy—sometimes thoughtfully, other times recklessly—while keeping the raunchiness and sub-bass sound of mobb music intact".

== Track listing ==
No.	Title	Writer(s)	Producer(s)	Length
1.	"Gettin' It" (featuring Parliament-Funkadelic)	Todd Shaw; William Collins; George Clinton, Jr.; Gary Cooper; Belita Woods	Shorty B; Parliament-Funkadelic (co.)	5:41
2.	"Survivin' the Game"	Shaw; Anthony Banks	Ant Banks	5:00
3.	"That's Why"	Shaw; Banks	Ant Banks	5:21
4.	"Bad Ways" (featuring Studd, Murda One, Joe Riz, and Sonji Mickey)	Shaw; Joey Coleman; Antoine Wright; Eugene James; Xavier Hargrove; James Elbert Phillips; Clinton, Jr.; Bernie Worrell; Collins	Spearhead X; The Soul Merchants (co.); L-Rock (co.)	4:56
5.	"Fuck My Car"	Shaw; Eric Breed	MC Breed	4:48
6.	"Take My Bitch"	Shaw; Colin Wolfe	Colin Wolfe	3:35
7.	"Buy You Some" (featuring Erick Sermon, MC Breed, and Kool-Ace)	Shaw; Stuart Jordan; Erick Sermon; Breed; Brian Fleming	Shorty B	5:15
8.	"Pimp Me" (featuring Goldy, Kool-Ace, Sir Captain, and Reel Tight)	Shaw; Herman Lang; Jordan; Mhisani Miller; Fleming	DJ Flash; Shorty B	5:44
9.	"Baby D" (featuring Baby D)	Banks; Derek Coleman	Ant Banks	1:58
10.	"Nasty Rhymes"	Shaw; Wolfe; J. Coleman	Colin Wolfe	3:46
11.	"Never Talk Down" (featuring Rappin' 4-Tay and MC Breed)	Shaw; Jordan; Taj Tilghman; Anthony Forté; Breed	Shorty B	5:11
12.	"I Must Confess" (featuring Reel Tight)	Shaw; Jordan	Shorty B	4:15
13.	"So Watcha Sayin'?"	Shaw; Wolfe	Colin Wolfe	2:54
14.	"I've Been Watching You (Move Your Sexy Body)" (featuring Parliament-Funkadelic)	Clinton, Jr.; Garry Shider; Glenn Goins	LA Dre	7:30

Sample credits

- "Gettin' It" contains portions of the composition "I'd Rather Be With You", written by William Collins, George Clinton, Jr., and Gary Cooper.
- "Bad Ways" contains a portion of the composition "Flashlight", written by George Clinton, Jr., Bernie Worrell, and William Collins.

== Charts ==
=== Weekly charts ===
Weekly chart performance for Gettin' It (Album Number Ten)
Chart (1996)	Peak position
US Billboard 200	3
US Top R&B/Hip-Hop Albums (Billboard)	1

=== Year-end charts ===
Year-end chart performance for Gettin' It (Album Number Ten)
Chart (1996)	Position
US Billboard 200	66
US Top R&B/Hip-Hop Albums (Billboard)	14

== Certifications ==
Certifications for Gettin' It (Album Number Ten)
Region	Certification	Certified units/sales
United States (RIAA)	Platinum	1,000,000^{^}
^{^} Shipments figures based on certification alone.

== See also ==
- List of number-one R&B albums of 1996 (U.S.)
