= Shorty the Pimp =

Studio album by Too Short
- Released: July 14, 1992
- Recorded: 1991–92
- Studios: One Little Indian Recording (El Cerrito, CA); Live Oak Studios (Berkeley, CA)
- Genre: Hip hop
- Length: 1:05:15
- Label: Jive
- Producers: Ant Banks; D'Wayne Wiggins; Too Short

Too Short chronology
Short Dog's in the House (1990)	Shorty the Pimp (1992)	Get in Where You Fit In (1993)

Singles from Shorty the Pimp
- 1. "I Want to Be Free (That's the Truth)" Released: June 8, 1992; 2. "In the Trunk" Released: September 11, 1992

Professional ratings
Review scores
Source	Rating
AllMusic	4/5 stars
Robert Christgau	C+

Shorty the Pimp is the seventh studio album by American rapper Too Short. It was released on July 14, 1992, via Jive Records. The album's title is taken from the 1973 blaxploitation film of the same name, featuring an eponymous character.

The recording sessions took place at One Little Indian Recording in El Cerrito and Live Oak Studios in Berkeley. The album was produced by Ant Banks, D'Wayne Wiggins, and Too Short, with Ted Bohanon serving as executive producer. It features guest appearances from Ant Banks, D'Wayne Wiggins, Mhisani and Pooh-Man.

The album debuted at number 6 on the US Billboard 200 chart with 82,000 copies sold in its first week. It was certified Gold by the Recording Industry Association of America on September 18, 1992 and achieved Platinum certification on January 19, 1996.

It was supported with two singles: "I Want to Be Free (That's the Truth)", which peaked at No. 41 on the Hot R&B/Hip-Hop Songs and No. 5 on the Hot Rap Songs, and "In the Trunk", which made it to No. 23 on the Hot Rap Songs. The album's second single "In the Trunk" can be heard in the opening scenes of the 2018 Marvel Comics film Black Panther.

== Track listing ==
No.	Title	Writer(s)	Producer(s)	Length
1.	"Intro: Shorty the Pimp"	Don Julian		0:42
2.	"In the Trunk"	Todd Shaw; Stuart Jordan	Too $hort	5:49
3.	"I Ain't Nothin' But a Dog"	Shaw; Damon Edwards; Anthony Banks; Stanley Clarke	Ant Banks	4:49
4.	"Hoes"	Shaw; George Clinton; Bernie Worrell; Garry Shider; Glenn Goins	Too $hort	6:22
5.	"No Love From Oakland"	Shaw; Clinton; Shider; William Collins	Ant Banks	8:25
6.	"I Want to Be Free (That's the Truth)"	Shaw; Kenneth Williams; Mel Kent; James Ralph Bailey; Isaac Hayes	Ant Banks	5:48
7.	"Hoochie" (featuring D'Wayne Wiggins)	Shaw; D'Wayne Wiggins	D'Wayne Wiggins	4:19
8.	"Step Daddy"	Shaw; Ron Dunbar; Clinton; Donnie Sterling	Ant Banks	4:22
9.	"It Don't Stop"	Shaw; Louis Crane; Belda Baine	Too $hort	4:21
10.	"So You Want to Be a Gangster"	Shaw; R. Surrell; Grover Washington Jr.	Ant Banks	4:04
11.	"Something to Ride To" (featuring Ant Banks, Pooh-Man and Mhisani)	Shaw; Banks; Lawrence Thomas; Jordan; Mhisani Miller	Too $hort; Ant Banks	11:57
12.	"Extra Dangerous Thanks"	Shaw; Jordan	Too $hort	4:19
Total length:				1:05:15

Sample credits

- Track 3 contains samples of "Slow Dance" written and performed by Stanley Clarke and "Cannot Find a Way" written and performed by Curtis Mayfield.
- Track 4 contains a portion of the composition "Take Your Dead Ass Home! (Say Som'n Nasty)" written by George Clinton, Bernie Worrell, Garry Shider and Glenn Goins.
- Track 5 contains a portion of the composition "Night of the Thumpasorus Peoples" written by George Clinton, Garry Shider and William Collins.
- Track 6 contains a sample of "I Want to Be Free" written by James Williams, Clarence Satchell, Leroy Bonner, Marshall Jones, Ralph Meadowbrooks, Marvin Pierce and William Beck and performed by the Ohio Players, and a portion of the composition "Sweet Music, Soft Lights & You" written by Kenneth Williams, Mel Kent, James Ralph Bailey and Isaac Hayes.
- Track 8 contains a sample of "Agony of Defeat" written by Ron Dunbar, George Clinton and Donnie Sterling and performed by Parliament-Funkadelic.
- Track 9 contains a portion of the composition "Pack It Up" written by Louis Crane and Belda Baine.
- Track 10 contains a portion of the composition "Black Frost" written by Grover Washington Jr.

== Personnel ==
- Todd "Too $hort" Shaw – vocals, producer (tracks: 2, 4, 9, 11, 12), mixing (tracks: 2, 4, 8)
- D'Wayne Wiggins – vocals & producer (track 7)
- Anthony "Ant" Banks – vocals (track 11), producer (tracks: 3, 5, 6, 8, 10, 11), mixing (tracks: 2–12)
- Lawrence "Pooh-Man" Thomas – vocals (track 11)
- Mhisani "Goldy" Miller – vocals (track 11)
- Carl Wheeler – keyboards (track 7), piano (track 11)
- Raphael Wiggins – synth-bass (track 7)
- Dale Everingham – recording & mixing (track 7)
- Tom Coyne – mastering
- Ted Bohanon – executive producer
- Victor Hall – photography

== Charts ==
Chart (1992)	Peak position
US Billboard 200	6
US Top R&B/Hip-Hop Albums (Billboard)	11

== Certifications ==
Region	Certification	Certified units/sales
United States (RIAA)	Platinum	1,000,000^{^}
^{^} Shipments figures based on certification alone.
