= Chase the Cat =

Studio album by Too $hort
- Released: November 20, 2001
- Recorded: 2000–01
- Studios: 320 Recording Studio (Decatur, GA); Blue Basement Recordings (Atlanta, GA); Circle House Studios (Miami Beach, FL); Larrabee Sound Studios (West Hollywood, CA); The Enterprise (Burbank, CA); Platinum House (Oakland, CA)
- Genre: Hip-hop
- Length: 1:08:14
- Labels: $hort; Jive
- Producers: Ant Banks; Daz Dillinger; Jazze Pha; Meech Wells; Spearhead X; Taj "Mahal" Tilghman; Tone Capone; Too $hort; Yaku Allen

Too $hort chronology
You Nasty (2000)	Chase the Cat (2001)	What's My Favorite Word? (2002)

Singles from Chase the Cat
- 1. "I Luv" Released: 2001

Professional ratings
Review scores
Source	Rating
AllMusic	2/5 stars
RapReviews	7/10

Chase the Cat is the thirteenth studio album by American rapper Too $hort. It was released on November 20, 2001, through Jive Records. The recording sessions took place at 320 Recording Studio in Decatur, Blue Basement Recordings in Atlanta, Circle House Studios in Miami Beach, Larrabee Sound Studios in West Hollywood, The Enterprise in Burbank and Platinum House in Oakland. The album was produced by Spearhead X, Ant Banks, Taj "Mahal" Tilghman, Daz Dillinger, Jazze Pha, Meech Wells, Tone Capone, Yaku Allen, and Too $hort. It features guest appearances from Ant Banks, Baby DC, Big Tigger, B-Legit, Daz Dillinger, Dolla Will, E-40, Erick Sermon, George Clinton, Jazze Pha, Kokane, MC Breed, Murda, Packy, Scarface, tha Eastsidaz, and Trick Daddy.

The album peaked at number 71 on the Billboard 200 and number 14 on the Top R&B/Hip-Hop Albums charts in the United States.

== Track listing ==
No.	Title	Writer(s)	Producer(s)	Length
1.	"Keep Fuckin' Me"	Todd Shaw; Xavier Hargrove; Stuart Jordan; James Harris III; Terry Lewis	Spearhead X	3:30
2.	"I Luv" (featuring Trick Daddy, Scarface and Daz Dillinger)	Shaw; Maurice Young; Brad Jordan; Delmar Arnaud	Daz Dillinger	3:47
3.	"Late Nite Creep" (featuring Jazze Pha, Murda and Packy)	Shaw; Antoine Wright; James Beard; Anthony Gilmour	Too $hort	4:27
4.	"These Are the Tales"	Shaw; Hargrove; S. Jordan	Spearhead X	4:41
5.	"This How We Eat" (featuring Tha Eastsidaz, Big Tigger and Kokane)	Shaw; Keiwan Spillman; Tracy Davis; Darian Morgan; Jerry Buddy Long Jr.; Cecil Demetrius Womack Jr.	Meech Wells	4:45
6.	"Candy Paint" (featuring MC Breed)	Shaw; Eric Breed; Quinton Banks	Too $hort	4:42
7.	"Fire" (featuring Erick Sermon)	Shaw; Erick Sermon; Hargrove; S. Jordan	Spearhead X	3:56
8.	"Can I Hit It"	Shaw; Hargrove; S. Jordan	Spearhead X	3:01
9.	"Chase the Cat" (featuring Dolla Will)	Shaw; Will Scott; Taj Tilghman; James Elbert Phillips	Taj "Mahal" Tilghman	3:40
10.	"Looking for a Baller" (featuring Jazze Pha)	Shaw; Phalon Alexander; Dennis Lambert; Duane Hitchings; Francine Vicki Golde	Jazze Pha	3:54
11.	"Pimpin' Ken (Interlude)"			1:31
12.	"Domestic Violence" (featuring E-40)	Shaw; Earl Stevens; Anthony Banks	Ant Banks	4:11
13.	"Player for Life"	Shaw; Hargrove; S. Jordan; Larry Blackmon	Spearhead X	3:32
14.	"Analyze the Game"	Shaw; Hargrove; Yaku Allen	Spearhead X; Yaku Allen	3:34
15.	"Talkin' Shit" (featuring B-Legit and Ant Banks)	Shaw; Brandt Jones; A. Banks	Ant Banks	4:52
16.	"U Stank" (featuring George Clinton and Baby DC)	Shaw; George Clinton; Derek Coleman; Tilghman	Taj "Mahal" Tilghman	5:56
17.	"Don't Ever Give Up"	Shaw; Gilmour	Tone Capone	4:15
Total length:				1:08:14

== Personnel ==
- Todd "Too $hort" Shaw – vocals, producer (tracks: 3, 6), executive producer
- Maurice "Trick Daddy" Young – vocals (track 2)
- Brad "Scarface" Jordan – vocals (track 2), additional vocals (track 16)
- Delmar "Daz Dillinger" Arnaud – vocals & producer (track 2)
- Joan Of Arc – vocals (track 2)
- Phalon "Jazze Pha" Alexander – vocals (tracks: 3, 10), keyboards, drum programming & producer (track 10)
- Antoine "Murda One" Wright – vocals (track 3)
- Packy – vocals (track 3)
- Keiwan "Goldie Loc" Spillman – vocals (track 5)
- Tracy "Big Tray Deee" Davis – vocals (track 5)
- Darian "Big Tigger" Morgan – vocals (track 5)
- Jerry Buddy "Kokane" Long Jr. – vocals (track 5)
- Eric "MC Breed" Breed – vocals (track 6)
- Erick Sermon – vocals (track 7)
- Crawfish – additional vocals (track 7)
- Will "Dolla Will" Scott Jr. – vocals (track 9)
- Daryl O. "AX" Tell – additional vocals (track 9)
- Earl "E-40" Stevens – vocals (track 12)
- Danny "Butch Cassidy" Means – additional vocals (track 12)
- Stuart "Shorty B" Jordan – additional vocals (track 13), guitar (tracks: 1, 13), keyboards & drum programming (tracks: 1, 4, 7, 8, 13, 14)
- Brandt "B-Legit" Jones – vocals (track 15)
- Anthony "Ant" Banks – vocals, keyboards & drums (track 15), producer & recording (tracks: 12, 15), mixing (tracks: 1–10, 12–17)
- Rodney "Harm" Waller – additional vocals (track 15)
- George Clinton – vocals (track 16)
- Derek "Baby DC" Coleman – vocals (track 16)
- Jerre Manning – additional vocals (track 16)
- Xavier "Spearhead X" Hargrove – keyboards, drum programming & producer (tracks: 1, 4, 7, 8, 13, 14), recording (tracks: 1, 4, 7, 8, 13)
- James "Jay Mac" Beard – guitar, keyboards & drum programming (track 3)
- Cecil Demetrius "Meech Wells" Womack Jr. – keyboards, drum programming & producer (track 5)
- Torrance Scott – guitar (track 6)
- Quinton "Quint Black" Banks – keyboards & drum programming (track 6)
- Taj "Mahal" Tilghman – keyboards & drum programming (track 9), producer & recording (tracks: 9, 16)
- James "LRoc" Phillips – keyboards & drum programming (track 9)
- Anthony "Tone Capone" Gilmour – keyboards, drums & producer (track 17)
- Yaku Allen – producer (track 14), recording (tracks: 1, 4, 7, 8, 13, 14)
- Robin Mays – recording (tracks: 2, 3, 6, 9, 10, 16, 17)
- Brian Kresakowski – recording (track 2)
- Asif Ali – recording (track 5)
- Michelle Forbes – recording (track 5)
- Marc Regan – mastering
- Ghetto Fabulous – illustration

== Charts ==
Chart (2001)	Peak position
US Billboard 200	71
US Top R&B/Hip-Hop Albums (Billboard)	14
