= Sittin' on Somethin' Phat =

Studio album by Ant Banks
- Released: March 9, 1993
- Studio: Dangerous Music Studios
- Genre: West Coast hip hop; gangsta rap
- Length: 55:38
- Label: Dangerous Music; Jive
- Producer: Ant Banks; Too $hort

Ant Banks chronology
Sittin' on Somethin' Phat (1993)	The Big Badass (1994)

Singles from Sittin' on Somethin' Phat
- 1. "Late Nite" Released: March 5, 1993; 2. "Livin the Life" Released: July 30, 1993

Sittin' on Somethin' Phat is the debut solo studio album by American rapper and record producer Ant Banks. It was released on March 9, 1993, via Dangerous Music/Jive Records. It was produced by Ant Banks and Too $hort. It features guest appearances from Goldy, Pooh-Man, Spice 1 and Too $hort. The album peaked at number 123 on the Billboard 200, number 22 on the Top R&B/Hip-Hop Albums and number 5 on the Heatseekers Albums in the United States.

== Track listing ==
No.	Title	Writer(s)	Producer(s)	Length
1.	"2 The Head"	Anthony Banks; Damon Edwards	Ant Banks	5:51
2.	"Late Nite Fuck"	Banks; Edwards	Ant Banks	3:16
3.	"Roll 'Em Phat"	Banks; Edwards	Ant Banks	4:45
4.	"U Just A Punk"	Banks	Ant Banks	4:37
5.	"Livin' The Life"	Banks	Ant Banks	4:34
6.	"Sittin' on Somethin' Phat"	Banks; Edwards; William Collins; George Clinton, Jr.; Walter Morrison	Ant Banks	5:09
7.	"Lyin' On Yo Dick" (featuring Mhisani)	Banks; Mhisani Miller	Ant Banks	3:50
8.	"Spice 1 Wit Da Banksta" (featuring Spice 1)	Banks; Robert Lee Greene Jr.	Ant Banks	3:55
9.	"Only Out to Fuck" (featuring Too $hort, Pooh-Man and Mhisani)	Banks; Todd Shaw; Lawrence Thomas; Miller	Ant Banks	4:43
10.	"Hit It"	Banks; R. Surrell; Clinton, Jr.; Garry Shider; Cordell Mosson; William Nelson	Too $hort	4:23
11.	"The End"	Banks	Ant Banks	10:38
Total length:				55:38

Sample credits

- Track 3 contains a sample from "Genius of Love" written by Tina Weymouth, Chris Frantz, Adrian Belew and Steven Stanley and performed by Tom Tom Club.
- Track 5 contains a sample of "Never, Never Gonna Give You Up" written by Barry White.
- Track 6 contains a sample of "Let's Play House" written by William Collins, George Clinton and Walter Morrison and performed by Parliament.
- Track 10 contains samples of "Nappy Dugout" written by George Clinton, Garry Shider and Cordell Mosson, and "Hit It and Quit It" written by Clinton and William Nelson both performed by Funkadelic.

== Personnel ==
- Anthony "Ant" Banks – vocals, keyboards, producer (tracks: 1–9, 11), engineering, mixing
- Mhisani "Goldy" Miller – vocals (tracks: 7, 9), engineering
- Robert Lee "Spice 1" Greene Jr. – vocals (track 8)
- Todd "Too $hort" Shaw – vocals (track 9), producer (track 10)
- Lawrence "M.C. Pooh-Man" Thomas – vocals (track 9)
- De Anthony Max – background vocals
- Stacy Hogg – background vocals
- Michael Hampton – guitar
- Derreck Hall – keyboards
- Sean-G – live drums (track 3)
- R. Austin – engineering
- L. Kenny – engineering
- T. Edwards – engineering
- D. "D-Wiz" Evelingham – engineering
- Victor Hall – photography

== Charts ==
Chart (1993)	Peak position
US Billboard 200	123
US Top R&B/Hip-Hop Albums (Billboard)	22
US Heatseekers Albums (Billboard)	5
