= Get in Where You Fit In =

1993 album by Too Short

Get In Where You Fit In

Studio album by Too Short
- Released: October 26, 1993
- Recorded: 1992–1993
- Studio: Dangerous
- Genres: West Coast hip-hop; gangsta rap; G-funk; dirty rap
- Length: 1:12:18
- Label: Jive
- Producers: The Dangerous Crew; QD3

Too Short chronology
Shorty the Pimp (1992)	Get In Where You Fit In (1993)	Cocktails (1995)

Singles from Get In Where You Fit In
- 1. "I'm a Player" Released: September 27, 1993; 2. "Money in the Ghetto" Released: January 17, 1994

Get In Where You Fit In is the eighth solo studio album by American rapper Too Short. It was released on October 26, 1993, through Jive Records, making it his fifth release for the label. The recording sessions took place at Dangerous Studios. The album was produced by the Dangerous Crew and Quincy Jones III. It features guest appearances from Ant Banks, Ant Diddley Dog, Father Dom, FM Blue, Mhisani, Pee Wee, Rappin' Ron, Ronese Levias, and Spice 1.

The album peaked at number four on the Billboard 200 and topped the Top R&B/Hip-Hop Albums chart. It was certified Platinum by the Recording Industry Association of America on November 16, 1994.

== Critical reception ==
Professional ratings
Review scores
Source	Rating
AllMusic	2/5 stars
Robert Christgau	(neither)
Entertainment Weekly	B−
Rolling Stone	4/5 stars
The Source	4/5 stars

Rolling Stone reviewer gave the album 4 out of 5 stars, stating: "on his fifth album, Get In Where You Fit In, Short plays his usual blaxploitation character, only he ain't battlin' the man, he's on his way to get some. Between "I'm a Player", "Playboy Short" and "Blow Job Betty", Short sounds like he's getting more than Shaft, Sweet Sweetback and Superfly combined". Dimitri Ehrlich of Entertainment Weekly found that: "In Get In Where You Fit In, Oakland rapper seems to be operating on mental cruise control as he recounts gratuitous tales of life as a player in the streets and bedrooms of his hometown. Producer Ant Banks' antiseptic assemblages lack all the grit of the original recordings from which they were sampled. The result? N.W.A redux meets P-Funk lite". AllMusic reviewer wrote: "Although he tries to cop part of the current P-Funk-inspired gangsta rap, Too Short sounds lost and dated on the overlong, sample-reliant, grotesquely misogynist, and musically muddled Get in Where You Fit In". Veteran critic Robert Christgau gave the album a "neither" rating.

== Track listing ==
No.	Title	Writer(s)	Producer(s)	Length
1.	"Don't Fight the Intro"	Todd Shaw	The Dangerous Crew	2:47
2.	"I'm a Player"	Shaw; William Collins; Gary Cooper; George Clinton, Jr.	The Dangerous Crew	6:01
3.	"Just Another Day"	Shaw	QDIII	7:21
4.	"Gotta Get Some Lovin'"	Shaw; Bill Curtis	Ant Banks	5:47
5.	"Money in the Ghetto"	Shaw	The Dangerous Crew	5:43
6.	"Blowjob Betty"	Shaw	The Dangerous Crew	5:26
7.	"All My Bitches Are Gone" (featuring Ant Banks)	Shaw; Anthony Banks	Ant Banks	5:37
8.	"The Dangerous Crew" (featuring Spice 1, Ant Banks, Mhisani, and Pee Wee)	Shaw; Robert Lee Green, Jr.; Banks; Mhisani Miller; Ramone Gooden; Clinton, Jr.; DeWayne McKnight; Pete Bishop	The Dangerous Crew	4:30
9.	"Get in Where You Fit In" (featuring Rappin' Ron and Ant Diddley Dog)	Shaw; Russell Royster; Anthony Nelson	The Dangerous Crew	8:34
10.	"Playboy $hort"	Shaw	Ant Banks	4:49
11.	"Way Too Real" (featuring Father Dom and Ant Banks)	Shaw; Damani Khaleel; Banks	Ant Banks	5:42
12.	"It's All Good" (featuring Ronese Levias)	Shaw; Roniece Levias	The Dangerous Crew	6:02
13.	"Oakland Style" (featuring FM Blue)	Shaw; FM Blue; Sylvester Levay; Stephan Prager	Ant Banks	4:47
Total length:				1:12:19

Sample credits

- Track 1 contains a sample of "Don't Fight the Feelin'" written by Kevin McCord and performed by One Way
- Track 2 contains a sample of "Hollywood Squares" written by William Collins, Gary Cooper, and George Clinton Jr., and performed by Bootsy Collins
- Track 3 contains a sample of "Bounce, Rock, Skate, Roll" written by Gregory Bufford, Jerome Bell, and Vaughn Mason, and performed by Vaughn Mason & Crew
- Track 4 contains a sample of "Love Spell" written by Bill Curtis and performed by Fatback Band
- Track 5 contains a sample of "Hollywood Swinging" performed by Kool and the Gang
- Track 6 contains a sample of "Ring the Alarm" written by Clive Bright and performed by Tenor Saw
- Track 7 contains a sample of "Shameless" written by Jean Roussel, Martin Simon, Tony Colton, and Wilson Pickett, and performed by Wilson Pickett
- Track 8 contains a sample of "Freak of the Week" written by George Clinton Jr., DeWayne McKnight, and Pete Bishop, and performed by Funkadelic
- Track 13 contains a sample of "Heart of Stone" written by Sylvester Levay and Stephan Prager, and performed by Silver Convention

== Personnel ==
- Todd "Too $hort" Shaw – main artist, mixing
- Anthony "Ant" Banks – featured artist (tracks: 7, 8, 11), keyboards, drum programming, producer, mixing
- Robert Lee "Spice 1" Green Jr. – featured artist (track 8)
- Mhisani "Goldy" Miller – featured artist (track 8)
- Ramone "Pee Wee" Gooden – featured artist (track 8)
- Russell "Rappin' Ron" Royster – featured artist (track 9)
- Anthony "Ant Diddley Dog" Nelson – featured artist (track 9)
- Leslie Calaway – featured artist (track 10)
- Damani "Father Dom" Khaleel – featured artist (track 11)
- Roniece Levias – featured artist (tracks: 10, 12)
- FM Blue – featured artist (track 13)
- Stuart "Shorty B" Jordan – lead guitar & bass (tracks: 1, 2, 5, 6, 8, 9, 12, 13)
- Stan "The Guitar Man" Jones – guitar (track 3)
- Ramon "Pee-Wee" Gooden – keyboards, live drums
- Quincy Jones III – keyboards & producer (track 3)
- Sean G – drums (tracks: 5, 10)
- Kirk Felton – digital editing
- Rob Chiarelli – engineering (track 3)
- Tom Coyne – mastering
- Nick Gamma – design
- Victor Hall – photography

== Charts ==
Chart (1993)	Peak position
US Billboard 200	4
US Top R&B/Hip-Hop Albums (Billboard)	1

== Certifications ==
Region	Certification	Certified units/sales
United States (RIAA)	Platinum	1,000,000^{^}
^{^} Shipments figures based on certification alone.

== See also ==
- List of Billboard number-one R&B albums of 1993
