= Cocktales (song) =

1994 single by Too Short

Single by Too $hort

from the album Cocktails
- Released: 1994
- Genre: Dirty rap
- Length: 6:06
- Label: Jive
- Songwriter(s): Todd Shaw; Stuart Jordan
- Producer(s): Shorty B

Too $hort singles chronology
"Money in the Ghetto" (1994)	"Cocktales" (1994)	"Paystyle" (1995)

Music video
- "Cocktales" on YouTube

"Cocktales" is a song by American rapper Too Short, released in 1994 as the lead single from his ninth studio album Cocktails (1995). The song was produced by Shorty B.

== Background ==
The title of the song is a play on the word "cocktails". Too Short described the song as "'Freaky Tales' part three, part four, whatever the fuck. Same shit." Lyrically, the song finds him detailing his many sexual conquests.

== Music video ==
A music video for the song was filmed. It features a Cadillac, the same one which Too Short used in the video of "I'm a Player".

== Charts ==
Chart (1995)	Peak position
US Billboard Hot 100	69
US Hot R&B/Hip-Hop Songs (Billboard)	43
US Hot Rap Songs (Billboard)	3
