= Lead the Way (album) =

Studio album by T.W.D.Y.
- Released: October 3, 2000
- Studios: The Platinum House; The Blue Basement
- Genres: West Coast hip-hop; gangsta rap
- Length: 1:13:46
- Label: Thump
- Producers: Ant Banks; Sonny B.; Too $hort

T.W.D.Y. chronology
Derty Werk (1999)	Lead the Way (2000)

Professional ratings
Review scores
Source	Rating
AllMusic	4/5 stars

Lead the Way is the second and final studio album by American Bay Area hip-hop supergroup T.W.D.Y. (The Whole Damn Yay). It was released on October 3, 2000, through Thump Records. Produced by Ant Banks, Sonny B and Too $hort, it features guest appearances from The Delinquents, Too $hort, Askari X, Baby DC, B-Legit, Casual, CJ Mac, Cold 187um, Den Gee, Dru Down, E-40, E-A-Ski, Goldy, Gripsta, Harm, Ice-T, J-Dubb, Keak da Sneak, King T, Kurupt, Luniz, Mac Shawn, MC Eiht, Murda One, Silk-E, Slink Capone, Smash, The Conscious Daughters, T-Pup and WC. In the United States, the album debuted at number 74 on the Top R&B/Hip-Hop Albums chart.

Rappin' 4-Tay was replaced by Dolla Will, who previously appeared on Derty Werk as a feature.

== Track listing ==
No.	Title	Writer(s)	Producer(s)	Length
1.	"Lead the Way" (featuring Too $hort and V-White)	Anthony Banks; Todd Shaw; Vidal Prevost; Kevin Dickson; Will Scott; Jeffrey McCormick; Greg Phillinganes; Lionel Richie	Ant Banks	4:38
2.	"X-Files" (featuring B-Legit and Harm)	A. Banks; Brandt Jones; Rodney Waller; J. Johnson	Ant Banks	4:32
3.	"Get That Paper" (featuring Askari X and V-White)	A. Banks; Ricky Murdock; Prevost; J. Johnson	Ant Banks	4:24
4.	"Wired Up" (featuring Yukmouth, Dru Down and CJ Mac)	A. Banks; Jerold Ellis; Darnel Robinson; Bryan Ross	Ant Banks	3:22
5.	"P.I. Interlude"			0:50
6.	"Shut Up" (featuring Ice-T and Too $hort)	A. Banks; Tracy Marrow; Shaw; J. Johnson; James Johnson	Ant Banks	5:27
7.	"Boss Bitches" (featuring Silk-E, The Conscious Daughters and Grip)	A. Banks; Erica Reynolds; Karryl Smith; Carla Green; Brandi Younger; Dionne Jackson; Sonny Sowles	Ant Banks; Sonny B.	3:33
8.	"Blue Suits and Badges" (featuring J-Dubb and Kurupt)	A. Banks; Leo Ramsey; Ricardo Brown; Sowles	Ant Banks; Sonny B.	4:12
9.	"No Win Situation" (featuring King T, Casual, G-Stack and Keak da Sneak)	A. Banks; Roger McBride; Glenn Jones; R. Ayers; C. Wildness; J. Johnson	Ant Banks	4:04
10.	"Oh Boy (Interlude)"	Ghetto Gomez		0:44
11.	"Game Shooters" (featuring E-40, Mac Shawn and Too $hort)	A. Banks; Scott; Earl Stevens; DeShawn Dawson; Shaw; Larry Blackmon; Tomi Jenkins	Ant Banks	6:15
12.	"Never Sober" (featuring MC Eiht and Numskull)	A. Banks; Scott; Aaron Tyler; Garrick Husbands; J. Johnson	Ant Banks	4:07
13.	"In the Ghetto" (featuring WC and G-Stack)	A. Banks; Dickson; Scott; Jones; William Calhoun; Rick James	Ant Banks	4:07
14.	"Hoes and Tricks" (featuring Goldy and Slink Capone)	A. Banks; Mhisani Miller; Jackson; Quinton Banks; J. Johnson; James Johnson; George Clinton Jr.; Steve Washington; Sheila Washington	Ant Banks; Too $hort	5:40
15.	"Let It Go" (featuring DenGee, T-Pup and Baby DC)	A. Banks; Dennis Thomas; Gregory Brown; Thomas Hudson; Danny Means II; Sowles; J. Johnson	Ant Banks; Sonny B.	4:28
16.	"Cali 4 Ni Yey" (featuring Too $hort and V-White)	A. Banks; Shaw; Dickson; Scott; Prevost; Roger Troutman; Larry Troutman	Ant Banks	4:33
17.	"The Hook Up" (featuring Murder One, Smash and Cold 187um)	A. Banks; Antoine Wright; Smash; Gregory Hutchinson; James Johnson	Ant Banks	4:38
18.	"Hater Bob (Interlude)"	Ghetto Gomez; The Madd Iddiot		1:08
19.	"Me and Ski" (featuring E-A-Ski)	A. Banks; Shon Adams; Sowles	Ant Banks; Sonny B.	3:04
Total length:				1:13:46

Sample credits

- Track 1 contains an interpolation of "Love Will Find a Way" written by Greg Phillinganes and Lionel Richie.
- Track 11 contains an interpolation of "Flirt" written by Larry Blackmon and Tomi Jenkins.
- Track 13 contains an interpolation of "Ghetto Life" written by Rick James.
- Track 14 contains an interpolation of "Do Fries Go with That Shake?" written by George Clinton Jr., Steve Washington and Sheila Washington.
- Track 16 contains an interpolation of "So Ruff, So Tuff" written by Roger Troutman and Larry Troutman.

== Personnel ==
- Anthony "Ant" Banks – keyboards & drums (tracks: 1-4, 6-9, 11-17, 19), engineering (track 16), executive producer
- Dionne Jackson – background vocals (tracks: 1, 3, 7, 11, 13, 14, 16)
- Jerry "Kokane" Long Jr. – background vocals (tracks: 6, 14, 17)
- Otis & Shug – background vocals (tracks: 12, 13, 16)
- Danny "Butch Cassidy" Means II – background vocals (track 15)
- James "Tre" Rabb – guitar (tracks: 6, 8, 11-13, 16, 17, 19)
- Elijah Baker – lead guitar (track 9), bass (track 15)
- John "Jubu" Smith – bass guitar (track 9)
- Sonny Sowles – keyboards & drums (tracks: 7, 8, 15, 19)
- C. Wheeler – keyboards & drums (track 9)
- Quinton "Quint Black" Banks – keyboards & drums (track 14)
- Jeffrey "J. Spencer" McCormick – saxophone (track 1)
- Marc Regan – mastering

== Charts ==
Chart (2000)	Peak position
US Top R&B/Hip-Hop Albums (Billboard)	74
