= Money in the Ghetto =

1994 single by Too Short

Single by Too $hort

from the album Get in Where You Fit In
- Released: January 17, 1994
- Length: 5:43
- Label: Jive
- Songwriter(s): Todd Shaw; Robert Bell; Ricky West; Khalis Bayyan; Claydes Smith; Dennis Thomas; George Brown; Robert Mickens
- Producer(s): The Dangerous Crew

Too $hort singles chronology
"I'm a Player" (1993)	"Money in the Ghetto" (1994)	"Cocktales" (1994)

Music video
- "Money in the Ghetto" on YouTube

"Money in the Ghetto" is a song by American rapper Too Short from his eighth studio album Get in Where You Fit In (1993). It was released as the album's second single on January 17, 1994. Produced by the Dangerous Crew, it contains a sample of "Hollywood Swinging" by Kool & the Gang.

== Background and composition ==
"Money in the Ghetto" has been considered the first song to sample "Hollywood Swinging". Too Short described the song as "more like 'The Ghetto' part two. That wasn't anything much more than that. Just revisiting the concept of 'The Ghetto'." The lyrics deal with the socioeconomic status and successes of people living in the ghetto, contradicting the stereotypes.

== Charts ==
Chart (1994)	Peak position
US Billboard Hot 100	90
US Dance Singles Sales (Billboard)	27
US Hot R&B/Hip-Hop Songs (Billboard)	64
US Hot Rap Songs (Billboard)	14
