= Gettin' It (song) =

Single by Too Short featuring Parliament-Funkadelic

from the album Gettin' It (Album Number Ten)
- Released: March 18, 1996
- Genre: G-funk
- Length: 5:41
- Label: Jive Records; Dangerous Music
- Songwriters: Belita Woods; Gary "Mudbone" Cooper; George Clinton; Todd Shaw
- Producers: Shorty B; Parliament-Funkadelic

Too $hort singles chronology
"Paystyle" (1995)	"Gettin' It" (1996)	"Rapper's Ball" (1996)

Parliament-Funkadelic singles chronology
"Chocolate City" (1975)	"Gettin' It" (1996)	"Bop Gun (Endangered Species)" (1997)

"Gettin' It" is a song by American rapper Too Short, released by Jive Records on March 16, 1996 as the only single from his tenth studio album, Gettin' It (Album Number Ten) (1996). Produced by Shorty B and the funk band Parliament-Funkadelic, the latter act performs the song's chorus.

"Gettin' It" peaked at number 68 on the Billboard Hot 100. Fellow West Coast rappers Coolio and Ice-T made cameos in the music video.

== Track listing ==
- CD Single
1. Gettin’ It (Video Version) (featuring Parliament-Funkadelic) — 4:55
2. Gettin’ It (Radio Version) (featuring Parliament-Funkadelic) — 4:25
3. Gettin’ It (LP Version) (featuring Parliament-Funkadelic) — 5:29

== Charts ==
Chart (1996)	Peak position
US Billboard Hot 100	68
US Hot R&B/Hip-Hop Songs (Billboard)	49
US Hot Rap Songs (Billboard)	9
