= Don't Try This at Home =

Don't Try This at Home may refer to:

- Don't Try This at Home (Billy Bragg album)
- Don't Try This at Home (The Dangerous Crew album), or the title song
- Don't Try This at Home (Michael Brecker album), or the title song
- Don't Try This at Home (YoungBoy Never Broke Again album)
- Don't Try This at Home (TV series), a British game show
- "Don't Try This at Home", a song by Chumbawamba from Readymades
- "Don't Try This at Home", a song by Mr. Bumpy (voiced by Jim Cummings) in an episode of the TV series Bump in the Night
- Don't Try This at Home, an album by Spock's Beard
- Don't Try This at Home: The Steve-O Video, compilations of Jackass outtakes
