= The Big Badass =

Studio album by Ant Banks
- Released: May 10, 1994
- Recorded: 1993–1994
- Studio: Dangerous Music Studio
- Genre: West Coast hip hop; gangsta rap
- Length: 55:00
- Label: Dangerous Music; Jive
- Producer: Ant Banks

Ant Banks chronology
| Sittin' on Somethin' Phat (1993) | The Big Badass (1994) | Do or Die (1995) |

Singles from The Big Badass
- 1. "Parlayin'" Released: 1994

Professional ratings
Review scores
| Source | Rating |
|---|---|
| AllMusic | 3/5 stars |

The Big Badass is the second solo studio album by the American rapper and record producer Ant Banks. It was released on May 10, 1994, through Dangerous Music/Jive Records. Produced entirely by Banks himself, it features guest appearances from Ant Diddley Dog, Boots Riley, Goldy, Rappin' Ron, Spice 1, Too $hort and the rest of The Dangerous Crew. The album peaked at number 80 on the Billboard 200 and number 10 on the Top R&B/Hip-Hop Albums in the United States.

== Track listing ==
| No. | Title | Writer(s) | Length |
|---|---|---|---|
| 1. | "The Big Badass" | Anthony Banks; Ramon Gooden | 5:30 |
| 2. | "2 Kill a G" (featuring Spice 1 & Too $hort) | Banks; Robert Lee Greene Jr.; Todd Shaw; Stuart Jordan; Gooden | 5:19 |
| 3. | "Streets of Oakland" (featuring Boots) | Banks; Raymond Riley; Gooden | 4:39 |
| 4. | "The Drunken Fool" | Banks; Gooden | 4:12 |
| 5. | "Parlayin'" (featuring Goldy) | Banks; Mhisani Miller; Ron Ford; Rick Evans; George Clinton; William Collins | 4:12 |
| 6. | "Clownin' Wit da Crew" (featuring The Dangerous Crew) | Banks; Damani M. Khaleel; R. Royster; Anthony Nelson; Shaw; Gooden; Clinton | 3:41 |
| 7. | "Fuckin' Wit Banks" (featuring Too $hort & Goldy) | Banks; Shaw; Miller; Gooden | 4:53 |
| 8. | "Straight Hustlin'" | Banks; Gooden; Clinton; Collins; Bernie Worrell | 4:28 |
| 9. | "Pimp Style Gangstas" (featuring Rappin' Ron & Ant Diddley Dog) | Banks; Royster; Nelson; Donnie Sterling; Ron Dunbar; Jim Vitti | 3:47 |
| 10. | "The Loot" (featuring Too $hort) | Banks; Shaw; Clinton; Worrell; Collins | 3:27 |
| 11. | "Packin' a Gat" | Banks; Jordan; Gooden | 5:19 |
| 12. | "Hard as Hell" | Banks; Jeffrey Spencer McCormick; Walter Becker; Donald Fagen | 5:33 |
| Total length: | | | 55:00 |

Sample credits

- Track 4 contains a sample of "House Full Of Girls" written by Isaac Hayes.
- Track 5 contains a sample of "F-Encounter" written by Ron Ford, Rick Evans, George Clinton Jr. and William Collins and performed by Bootsy Collins.
- Track 6 contains a sample of "Go Fer Yer Funk" written by George Clinton Jr. and performed by Parliament.
- Track 8 contains a portion of the composition "Children of Production" written by George Clinton Jr., William Collins and Bernie Worrell.
- Track 9 contains a portion of the composition "No Rump To Bump" written by Donnie Sterling, Ron Dunbar and Jim Vitti.
- Track 10 contains a portion of the composition "Chocolate City" written by George Clinton Jr., Bernie Worrell and William Collins.
- Track 12 contains a portion of the composition "Home At Last" written by Walter Becker and Donald Fagen.

== Personnel ==
- Anthony "Ant" Banks – vocals, keyboards, guitar, drum programming, producer, engineering
- Todd "Too $hort" Shaw – vocals (tracks: 2, 6, 7, 10), executive producer
- Robert Lee "Spice 1" Greene Jr. – vocals (track 2)
- Raymond "Boots" Riley – vocals (track 3)
- Mhisani "Goldy" Miller – vocals (tracks: 5, 7)
- Anthony "Ant Diddley Dog" Nelson – vocals (tracks: 6, 9)
- R. "Rappin' Ron" Royster – vocals (tracks: 6, 9)
- Damani "Father Dom" Khaleel – vocals (track 6)
- Ramone "Pee-Wee" Gooden – vocals (track 6), keyboards, guitar, engineering
- Stacy Hogg – backing vocals (tracks: 1, 4, 7, 9)
- Clyde Thompson – backing vocals (track 1)
- Otis Cooper – backing vocals (track 4)
- Sugar Ray Howell – backing vocals (track 4)
- Kiki Hitsville – backing vocals (track 6)
- Roniece Levias – backing vocals (track 11)
- Tony Edwards – backing vocals (track 11)
- Jeffrey Spencer McCormick – saxophone (track 12)
- Kirk Felton – digital editing
- Tom Coyne – mastering
- Randy Austin – executive producer
- Izumi Inoue – design

== Charts ==
| Chart (1994) | Peak position |
|---|---|
| US Billboard 200 | 80 |
| US Top R&B/Hip-Hop Albums (Billboard) | 10 |
