= Richard Jon Smith =

- Born: Richard Jon Smith; September 6, 1951 (age 75); Cape Town, South Africa
- Genre: pop music
- Occupations: singer, producer
- Instrument: vocals
- Spouse: Glenda

Richard Jon Smith (born 6 September 1951) is a South African pop singer who transcended the racial segregation of apartheid and became known nationally and internationally with the success of his 1973 hit "That's Why I Love You". He released his first single, "Candlelight", in 1972, followed by winning double gold record awards for "That's Why I Love You", "Michael Row the Boat Ashore", "Happy and Gay", "Sweet Mama", "Dayo-Island" and others.

Before becoming a superstar in South Africa at the age of 23, Smith was a porter at Cape Town's Groote Schuur Hospital. He was known as "Mr. Knockout" by his fans, in reference to his chart-busters songs. Smith was a local megastar in 1972 when he was described in the Sunday Times as an "ad man's dream", at the time he was the centrepiece of a brandy promotion.

Smith, along with his wife Glenda, moved to the United Kingdom in 1981, where he began working as a songwriter-producer-recording artist in England with Jive Records, having produced the album Whodini, among others. He returned to South Africa only in 2012, to perform as a guest artist at the three-day Zane Adam Tribute Concert, at GrandWest Arena, where he was received with great enthusiasm by the public.

== Discography ==
- Superstar Smith
