= I'm a Player =

1993 single by Too Short

Single by Too $hort

from the album Get in Where You Fit In
- Released: September 27, 1993
- Genre: Dirty rap; G-funk
- Length: 6:01 ("Street Version"); 4:40 (clean version)
- Label: Jive
- Songwriters: Todd Shaw; William Collins; Gary Cooper; George Clinton, Jr.
- Producer: The Dangerous Crew

Too $hort singles chronology
| "In the Trunk" (1992) | "I'm a Player" (1993) | "Money in the Ghetto" (1994) |

Music video
- "I'm a Player" on YouTube

"I'm a Player" is a song by American rapper Too Short, released as the lead single from his eighth studio album, Get in Where You Fit In (1993). The song was produced by the Dangerous Crew and samples "Hollywood Squares" by Bootsy Collins.

== Critical reception ==
The song has been considered a highlight of Get in Where You Fit In. "NL" praised the song for its "bass line and autobiographical lyrics", citing it as the reason to listen to the album more than once.

== Music video ==
A music video for the song was shot in Oakland, California. Too Short raps at a pool party at his house and driving around town in a Cadillac.

== Charts ==
| Chart (1993) | Peak position |
|---|---|
| US Billboard Hot 100 | 85 |
| US Hot R&B/Hip-Hop Songs (Billboard) | 39 |
| US Hot Rap Songs (Billboard) | 17 |
| US Maxi-Singles Sales (Billboard) | 2 |
