= What's My Favorite Word? =

Studio album by Too $hort
- Released: September 10, 2002
- Recorded: 2001–02
- Genre: Hip hop
- Length: 1:02:31
- Labels: $hort; Jive
- Producers: Ant Banks; Dez; George Clinton; L.A. Dre; Lil' Jon; LRoc; Shorty B; Taj "Mahal" Tilghman; Too $hort

Too $hort chronology
Chase the Cat (2001)	What's My Favorite Word? (2002)	Married to the Game (2003)

Singles from What's My Favorite Word?
- 1. "Quit Hatin'" Released: 2002

Professional ratings
Review scores
Source	Rating
AllMusic	2/5 stars
Blender	2/5 stars
HipHopDX	3/5
RapReviews	7.5/10

What's My Favorite Word? is the fourteenth solo studio album by American rapper Too $hort. It was released on September 10, 2002, through Jive Records, making it his eleventh album for the label.

Production was handled by Lil' Jon, Shorty B, Ant Banks, Dez, George Clinton, L.A. Dre, LRoc, Taj "Mahal" Tilghman, and Too $hort himself, who also served as executive producer. It features guest appearances from Lil' Jon & the East Side Boyz, Ant Banks, Belita Woods, Big Gipp, B-Legit, Bun B, Devin the Dude, Dolla Will, D'Wayne Wiggins, E-40, George Clinton, Petey Pablo, Pimp C, Roger Troutman Jr., Twista and V-White.

The album reached number 38 on the Billboard 200 and number 8 on the Top R&B/Hip-Hop Albums charts in the United States.

The answer to the question posed in the album's title is "bitch".

== Track listing ==
No.	Title	Writer(s)	Producer(s)	Length
1.	"Triple X"	Todd Anthony Shaw; Shanell Woodgett; Dorian Michelle Hardnett; Quinton J. Banks	Too $hort	4:47
2.	"Get That Cheese" (featuring Roger Troutman, Jr.)	Shaw; Roger Lynch Troutman; Desmond Mapp	Dez	3:32
3.	"That's Right"	Shaw; James Elbert Phillips	Too $hort; Priest; LRoc	4:10
4.	"The Old Fashioned Way"	Shaw; Q. Banks	Too $hort	4:23
5.	"Quit Hatin' Pt. 1" (featuring Twista, V-White, Lil' Jon & the East Side Boyz)	Shaw; Carl Mitchell; Vidal Prevost; Jonathan Smith	Lil' Jon	4:48
6.	"Quit Hatin' Pt. 2" (featuring Pimp C, Lil' Jon & the East Side Boyz)	Shaw; Chad Butler; Smith; Robin Mays; T. Swann	Lil' Jon	4:12
7.	"Lollypops"	Shaw; Woodgett; Hardnett; Q. Banks	Too $hort	4:17
8.	"Female Players"	Shaw; Woodgett; Andre Bolton	Too $hort; L.A. Dre	3:48
9.	"Cali-O" (featuring E-40, B-Legit, Ant Banks & D'Wayne Wiggins)	Shaw; Earl Stevens; Brandt Jones; Anthony Banks; D'Wayne Wiggins	Ant Banks	5:37
10.	"Pimp Life" (featuring Devin the Dude, Bun B & Big Gipp)	Shaw; Devin Copeland; Bernard James Freeman; Cameron Gipp; Stuart Jordan	Too $hort; Shorty B	5:35
11.	"Call It Gangster" (featuring Petey Pablo & Dolla Will)	Shaw; Moses Barrett III; Will Scott; Smith	Lil' Jon	4:29
12.	"Set Up"	Shaw; Taj Tilghman	Taj "Mahal" Tilghman	3:21
13.	"She Loves Her"	Shaw; Hardnett; Q. Banks; James Bromley Spicer; Russell Simmons	Too $hort	3:57
14.	"The Movie" (featuring George Clinton & Belita Woods)	Shaw; George Clinton; Belita Karen Woods; Jordan; Vaughn Wilson	Too $hort; George Clinton; Shorty B	5:35
Total length:				1:02:31

== Charts ==
Chart (2002)	Peak position
US Billboard 200	38
US Top R&B/Hip-Hop Albums (Billboard)	8
