= We Can Do Whatever =

Studio album by Otis & Shug
- Released: January 18, 2005
- Genres: Rhythm and blues, soul, new jack swing, funk
- Length: 72:38
- Label: Expansion Records
- Producer: Raphael Saadiq

Singles from We Can Do Whatever
- 1. "Journey" Released: February 11, 1996

Professional ratings
Review scores
| Source | Rating |
|---|---|
| Soul Express | (positive) |

We Can Do Whatever is the only studio album by the American singing duo Otis & Shug. Although it was scheduled to be released August 29, 1995, on Interscope Records, the album was shelved until January 18, 2005, when it was released by Expansion Records. It was produced by Raphael Saadiq. One single, "Journey", peaked at number 60 on the 1996 Billboard Hot R&B/Hip-Hop Songs. It features a guest performance by Saadiq.

== Track listing ==
1. "Journey" – 5:04
2. "Fantasy" – 3:36
3. "If You Want It" – 4:29
4. "My First Mistake" – 4:38
5. "My Choice" – 6:29
6. "Thank You for My Baby" – 5:22
7. "Right on Track" – 5:10
8. "What Does It Take" – 4:41
9. "Never Known" (featuring Raphael Saadiq) – 3:49
10. "Something Inside of Me" – 4:32
11. "Peace of Mind" – 3:20
12. "This Is My Phone Call" – 5:04
13. "Interlude" – 0:55
14. "Round and Round" – 4:27
15. "Indiana" – 5:24
16. "Goodbye" (Alt Phone) – 5:09

== Chart history ==
| Song | Chart (1996) | Peak position |
|---|---|---|
| "Journey" | U.S. Billboard Hot R&B Singles | 60 |

== Personnel ==
- David "Shug" Cooper - Performer
- Otis Cooper - Performer
- Ralph Tee - Liner notes
- Raphael Saadiq - Producer
- Roger Williams His Piano and Orchestra - Design
