= School Dayz =

Studio album by Baby DC
- Released: September 29, 1998
- Recorded: 1998
- Genre: Hip hop
- Length: 38:54
- Label: $hort; Jive
- Producer: Ant Banks; Jay Mac; Jazze Pha; Larry "Rock" Campbell; Quint Black; Spearhead X; Taj "Mahal" Tilghman

Singles from School Dayz
- 1. "Bounce, Rock, Skate, Roll" Released: March 16, 1999

Professional ratings
Review scores
Source	Rating
AllMusic	2/5 stars

School Dayz is the only studio album by American Oakland-based 13-years-old rapper Baby DC. It was released on July 27, 1999 through $hort Records, a Too $hort's vanity label on Jive Records. Production was handled by Ant Banks, Taj "Mahal" Tilghman, Jay Mac, Jazze Pha, Larry "Rock" Campbell, Quint Black and Spearhead X, with Paul Brown and Too $hort serving as executive producers. It features guest appearances from Imajin, Ant Banks, E-40, Lil' Rakim and Too $hort, with cameos from Ice Cube, Kid Capri and Snoop Dogg.

School Dayz was released before So So Def's Lil' Bow Wow and No Limit's Lil Soldiers and Lil Romeo were releasing charting albums. However, due to limited promotion, School Dayz did not reach any Billboard charts. However, the single "Bounce, Rock, Skate, Roll" did make it to both the R&B and rap charts.

== Track listing ==
No.	Title	Producer(s)	Length
1.	"Kid Capri Intro"		0:13
2.	"Bounce, Rock, Skate, Roll" (featuring Imajin)	Ant Banks	4:47
3.	"Do That Dance (Say Uhh Ohh)"	Spearhead X	2:37
4.	"Rich Kids 4 Life" (featuring Lil' Rakim)	Jay Mac	2:58
5.	"Message From Snoop Dogg"		0:24
6.	"Candy Girl" (featuring Imajin)	Larry "Rock" Campbell	3:40
7.	"I'm Feelin' You"	Taj "Mahal" Tilghman	3:34
8.	"That Ain't Much (It's a School Boy Crush)"	Ant Banks	4:00
9.	"Message from Ice Cube"		0:17
10.	"Get Your Hustle On" (featuring Too $hort)	Taj "Mahal" Tilghman	4:33
11.	"Gimme Mine" (featuring E-40)	Quint Black	4:33
12.	"Video Game Playa"	Jazze Pha	3:39
13.	"Poppa Was a Soldier (R.I.P.)" (featuring Ant Banks)	Ant Banks	3:39
Total length:			38:54

== Personnel ==
- Derek "Baby DC" Coleman – vocals
- Imajin – vocals (tracks: 2, 6)
- Lil' Rakim – vocals (track 4)
- Todd "Too $hort" Shaw – vocals (track 10), executive producer
- Earl "E-40" Stevens – vocals (track 11)
- Anthony "Ant" Banks – vocals (track 13), producer (tracks: 2, 8, 13)
- David Anthony "Kid Capri" Love Jr. – voice (track 1)
- Jonathan "Lil' Jon" Smith – backing vocals (track 3)
- Calvin "Snoop Dogg" Broadus Jr. – voice (track 5)
- O'Shea "Ice Cube" Jackson Sr. – voice (track 9)
- Xavier "Spearhead X" Hargrove – producer (track 3)
- James "Jay Mac" Beard – producer (track 4)
- Larry "Rock" Campbell – producer (track 6)
- Taj "Mahal" Tilghman – producer (tracks: 7, 10), coordinator
- Phalon "Jazze Pha" Alexander – producer (track 12)
- Tom Coyne – mastering
- Paul Brown – executive producer
- Ernest Washington – photography

== Charts ==
=== "Bounce, Rock, Skate, Roll" ===
Chart (1999)	Peak position
Billboard Hot R&B/Hip-Hop Songs	91
Billboard Hot Rap Songs	12
