= You Nasty =

Studio album by Too Short
- Released: September 12, 2000
- Recorded: 1999–2000
- Studio: Sins Crib (Houston, TX); Mirror Image Studios (New York, NY); Blue Basement Recordings (Atlanta, GA); Backyard Beats
- Genre: Hip hop
- Length: 56:31
- Label: $hort; Jive
- Producer: Ant Banks; DJ Silk; Don "DJ Snake" Brown; Erick Sermon; Jazze Pha; Michael "Mike D" Dinkins; Prowla; Quint Black; Sonny B

Too Short chronology
Can't Stay Away (1999)	You Nasty (2000)	Chase the Cat (2001)

Singles from You Nasty
- 1. "2 Bitches" Released: 2000; 2. "You Nasty" Released: 2000

You Nasty is the twelfth studio album by American rapper Too Short. It was released on September 12, 2000, via Jive Records, making it his ninth release on the label. The recording sessions took place at Sins Crib in Houston, Mirror Image Studios in New York, Blue Basement Recordings in Atlanta, and Backyard Beats. The album was produced by Don "DJ Snake" Brown, Michael "Mike D" Dinkins, Sonny B, Quint Black, Ant Banks, DJ Silk, Erick Sermon, Jazze Pha, and Prowla. It features guest appearances from Captain Save 'Em, Chyna Whyte, E-40, Kokane, and the Nation Riders. The album peaked at number 12 on the Billboard 200 and number four on the Top R&B/Hip-Hop Albums chart in the United States. It was certified Gold by the Recording Industry Association of America on October 30, 2000 for selling 500,000 units. Two singles were released, "2 Bitches" and "You Nasty", which made it to the US Hot Rap Songs chart at numbers two and six, respectively.

== Critical reception ==
Professional ratings
Review scores
Source	Rating
AllMusic	3/5 stars
Entertainment Weekly	C+
RapReviews	7/10
Spin	6/10

Steve 'Flash' Juon of RapReviews said, "[T]he limited amount of guest appearances (E-40, Chyna, and the Nation Riders) keeps Too $hort in the spotlight, and his typically pimpish raps set the mold for all the future players who came after. If you were already a Too $hort fan, this album will actually be an improvement over "Can't Stay Away" in that it's shorter but more focused." AllMusic's Jason Birchmeier highlighted "2 Bitches", "Anything is Possible", and the title track as the most notable, concluding with: "There's a good serving of filler here, of course, yet overall You Nasty is one of Too Short's more inspired, if sharply jaded, post-retirement albums." Entertainment Weekly's Craig Seymour wrote that "while some tunes are intended to be cautionary, his matter-of-fact delivery over funky grooves render them seductively ineffectual."

== Track listing ==
No.	Title	Writer(s)	Producer(s)	Length
1.	"Anything is Possible"	Todd Shaw; Dantly Wyatt	Prowler; Jay Sinnusta (co.)	4:22
2.	"You Nasty"	Shaw; Quinton Banks	Quint Black	3:30
3.	"Pimp Shit" (featuring Kokane)	Shaw; Jerry Long, Jr.; Russell Brown; George Clinton, Jr.; David Spradley; Garry Shider	DJ Silk	4:46
4.	"Just Like Dope" (featuring E-40)	Shaw; Earl Stevens; Michael Dinkins; Sonny Sowles	Mike D; Sonny B	3:54
5.	"Call Me Daddy"	Shaw; Q. Banks	Quint Black	3:54
6.	"Recognize Game" (featuring Chyna Whyte)	Shaw; Stephanie Martin; Dinkins; Sowles	Mike D; Sonny B	4:02
7.	"She Know" (featuring The Nation Riders)	Shaw; Antoine Wright; Eugene James; Frederick Reed; Gerald Anthony Johnson; Joey Coleman; Michael Hepburn; Wilbert Scott	Don "DJ Snake" Brown	4:29
8.	"2 Bitches"	Shaw; Phalon Alexander	Jazze Pha	3:57
9.	"All the Time"	Shaw; Don Brown	Don "DJ Snake" Brown	3:59
10.	"Where They At?" (featuring Captain Save 'Em)	Shaw; Kevin Dickson; Anthony Banks	Ant Banks	4:00
11.	"Don't Hate the Player"	Shaw; Dinkins; Sowles	Mike D; Sonny B	3:12
12.	"Be My Dirty Love"	Shaw; Erick Sermon; Hamilton Bohannon	Erick Sermon	3:57
13.	"Nation Riders Anthem"	Shaw; D. Brown	Don "DJ Snake" Brown	3:59
14.	"Old School"	Shaw; D. Brown	Don "DJ Snake" Brown	4:30
Total length:				56:31

== Charts ==
Chart (2000)	Peak position
US Billboard 200	12
US Top R&B/Hip-Hop Albums (Billboard)	4

== Certifications ==
Region	Certification	Certified units/sales
United States (RIAA)	Gold	500,000^{^}
^{^} Shipments figures based on certification alone.
