= Cocktails (album) =

Studio album by Too Short
- Released: January 24, 1995
- Recorded: 1994
- Studios: Dangerous Music; D.A.R.P. Studios (Atlanta, GA); Battery Studios (New York, NY)
- Genres: Hip-hop; G-funk; dirty rap
- Length: 1:07:35
- Labels: Dangerous Music; Jive
- Producers: Ant Banks; B. Turner; L.A. Dre; Shorty B; Spearhead X; The Dangerous Crew; Too Short

Too Short chronology
Get in Where You Fit In (1993)	Cocktails (1995)	Gettin' It (Album Number Ten) (1996)

Singles from Cocktails
- 1. "Cocktales" Released: 1994; 2. "Paystyle" Released: 1995

Professional ratings
Review scores
Source	Rating
AllMusic	4/5 stars
Los Angeles Times	3/4 stars
Rap Pages	8/10

Cocktails is the ninth solo studio album by American rapper Too Short. It was released on January 24, 1995, via Jive Records—making it his sixth LP for the label. The recording sessions took place at Dangerous Music, at DARP Studios in Atlanta and at Battery Studios in New York. The album was produced by the Dangerous Crew, B. Turner and L.A. Dre. It features guest appearances from 2Pac, Ant Banks, Baby DC, Father Dom, Illegal, L.A. Dre, MC Breed, Old School Freddy B, and the rest of the Dangerous Crew.

The album debuted at number six on the Billboard 200 and atop of the Top R&B/Hip-Hop Albums chart, with the first-week sales of 101,000 copies in the US. It received Gold certification by the Recording Industry Association of America on March 27, 1995, and was certified Platinum on January 6, 1997. Its lead single, "Cocktales", made it to number 69 on the Billboard Hot 100, number 43 on the Hot R&B/Hip-Hop Songs and number 3 on the Hot Rap Songs charts.

== Track listing ==
No.	Title	Writer(s)	Producer(s)	Length
1.	"Ain't Nothing Like Pimpin'" (featuring the D.O.C. & MC Breed)	Todd Anthony Shaw; Stuart Jordan; Ramon Gooden; Xavier Hargrove	The Dangerous Crew	6:46
2.	"Cocktales"	Shaw; Jordan	Shorty B	6:06
3.	"Can I Get a Bitch" (featuring Ant Banks)	Shaw; Anthony Banks	Ant Banks	5:12
4.	"Coming up Short"	Shaw; Gooden; Mhisani Miller	Pee-Wee	5:42
5.	"Thangs Change" (featuring Illegal and Baby D)	Shaw; LaMorris Edwards; Derek Coleman; Jordan	Spearhead X; Too $hort	6:07
6.	"Paystyle"	Shaw; Jordan; Gooden	The Dangerous Crew	5:44
7.	"Giving Up the Funk" (featuring the Dangerous Crew)	Shaw; Banks; Miller; Gooden; George Clinton; William Collins	Ant Banks	5:14
8.	"Top Down"	Banks; Miller	Ant Banks	5:07
9.	"We Do This" (featuring 2Pac, MC Breed and Father Dom)	Shaw; Tupac Shakur; Eric Breed; Damani M. Khaleel; Jordan; Gooden	The Dangerous Crew	5:51
10.	"Game" (featuring Old School Freddy B)	Shaw; Anthony Adams	L.A. Dre	5:16
11.	"Sample the Funk"	Shaw; Greg Webster; Marvin Pierce; Bruce Napier; Clarence Satchell; Leroy Bonner; Marshall Jones; Ralph Middlebrooks; Walter Morrison	Too $hort	6:54
12.	"Don't Fuck for Free"	Shaw; Britton Turner; Breed	Too $hort; B. Turner	3:35
Total length:				1:07:35

Sample credits

- Track 7 contains a sample of "Disco to Go" written by George Clinton and William Collins and performed by the Brides of Funkenstein.
- Track 11 contains a portion of the composition "Funky Worm" written by Gregory Webster, Marvin Pierce, Bruce Napier, Clarence Satchell, Leroy Bonner, Marshall Jones, Ralph Middlebrooks and Walter Morrison.

== Charts ==
=== Weekly charts ===
Chart (1995)	Peak position
US Billboard 200	6
US Top R&B/Hip-Hop Albums (Billboard)	1

=== Year-end charts ===
Chart (1995)	Position
US Billboard 200	134
US Top R&B/Hip-Hop Albums (Billboard)	26

== Certifications ==
Region	Certification	Certified units/sales
United States (RIAA)	Platinum	1,000,000^{^}
^{^} Shipments figures based on certification alone.

== See also ==
- List of Billboard number-one R&B albums of 1995
