= Invasion of the Flat Booty Bitches =

1998 single by Too Short

Single by Too $hort

from the album Can't Stay Away
- B-side: "Don't Stop Rappin'"
- Released: September 8, 1998
- Length: 4:26
- Label: Jive
- Songwriter: Todd Shaw
- Producer: Erick Sermon

Too $hort singles chronology
"Independence Day" (1998)	"Invasion of the Flat Booty Bitches" (1998)	"More Freaky Tales" (1999)

"Invasion of the Flat Booty Bitches" is a song by American rapper Too Short, released on September 8, 1998, as the lead single from his eleventh studio album Can't Stay Away (1999). It was produced by Erick Sermon.

== Background ==
According to Too Short, there are several versions of the song. He recorded the first when he was in high school, another version when he was signed to 75 Girls Records and Tapes, and the final one when he changed to Jive Records. With respect to the inspiration of the song, he said:

We was cutting school one day and went down to Berkeley. We went from our school to Berkeley High and we were smoking weed and shit. We just kept laughing because there were these flat booty girls everywhere we went. We really were on a mission that day, looking for a girl with a fat ass and I was the one who wrote the song about it.

Rapper Erick Sermon had heard the song and wanted Too Short to make it. He produced the final version of the song.

== Charts ==
Chart (1998)	Peak position
US Billboard Hot 100	51
US Hot R&B/Hip-Hop Songs (Billboard)	41
US Hot Rap Songs (Billboard)	4
