= Can't Stay Away =

Studio album by Too Short
- Released: July 13, 1999
- Recorded: 1998–1999
- Studios: Oakland City Studios; Ant Banks Bad Ass Beat Lab in Atlanta, Georgia; Additional Engineering & Mixing: Battery Studios (NYC), D.A.R.P. Studios (Atlanta), Echo Sound (LA), Enterprise Studios (LA), Larrabee Studios (LA), Patchwerk Studios (Atlanta), The Plant (Sausalito, CA), Purple Dragon Studios (Atlanta), Quad Studios (NYC), Track Recordz (LA)
- Genre: Hip hop
- Length: 60:15
- Label: Jive
- Producers: Too Short; Erick Sermon; Diamond D; Ant Banks; Kenny Flav; Delite; Mike D.; Jermaine Dupri; Jay Mac; Jazze Pha; Lil' Jon; Quinton Banks

Too Short chronology
Gettin' It (Album Number Ten) (1996)	Can't Stay Away (1999)	You Nasty (2000)

Singles from Can't Stay Away
- 1. "Invasion of the Flat Booty Bitches" Released: September 8, 1998; 2. "More Freaky Tales" Released: December 22, 1998; 3. "It's About That Money" Released: 1999

Professional ratings
Review scores
Source	Rating
AllMusic	2.5/5 stars
Rolling Stone	3/5 stars
The Source	4/5 stars

Can't Stay Away is the eleventh studio album by American rapper Too Short. It was released on July 13, 1999, via Jive Records, making it his eighth album on the label. The album received generally positive reviews from critics and was a commercial success, certified Gold on August 13, 1999, only a month after its release. This is Too Short's fourth consecutive album to reach the top of the US Top R&B/Hip-Hop Albums chart.

The album was preceded by the singles "Invasion of the Flat Booty Bitches" which rose to number 51 on Billboard's Hot 100 chart in September 1998, and "More Freaky Tales" which hit number 3 on the Hot Rap chart in January 1999. A music video was produced for the song "Ain't No Bitches". "It's About That Money" with Sean "Puffy" Combs was released as a single to accompany the album in mid-1999, but it missed the Hot 100 by four places in August. The Village Voice called out "It's About That Money" and "Here We Go" as the best two songs on the album, the rest are described as Too Short's usual "trunk funk" style.

== Track listing ==
No.	Title	Length
1.	"Can't Stay Away"	4:28
2.	"Ain't No Bitches"	4:54
3.	"Don't Stop Rappin'" (featuring 8Ball & MJG)	5:51
4.	"Here We Go" (featuring Jay-Z and Jermaine Dupri)	4:42
5.	"More Freaky Tales"	5:08
6.	"You Might Get G'eed" (featuring E-40, Daz Dillinger, and Soopafly)	5:22
7.	"Good Life" (featuring Jazze Pha)	3:55
8.	"Longevity" (featuring Scarface, K.B., Otis & Shug)	4:00
9.	"How Does It Feel" (featuring D'wayne Wiggins)	4:31
10.	"What Happened to the Groupies" (featuring B-Legit)	5:35
11.	"Invasion of the Flat Booty Bitches"	4:26
12.	"Can't Stay Away (Outro)"	1:32
13.	"It's About That Money" (featuring Puff Daddy)	4:45
14.	"Nation Riders" (performed by Slink Capone, Murda One, G-Side, and Playa Playa)	4:44
15.	"G-2000" (performed by Badwayz, Zu, Al Block, and Hellkilla)	4:34
16.	"Don't Trust Her" (performed by Badwayz)	4:36
17.	"In the Studio" (performed by Quint Black)	2:54

== Credits ==
- 8Ball – Composer, Featured Artist
- Yaku Allen – Composer
- B-Legit - Composer, Featured Artist, Guest Artist, Performer
- Sonny B – Keyboards, Producer
- Badwayz – Performer, Primary Artist
- Ant Banks – Composer, Engineer, Keyboards, Mixing, Producer
- Quinton Banks - Producer (tracks 6, 8, 9, 17)
- Black – Keyboards (5)(tracks 6, 8, 9), Performer
- Quint Black – Composer, Performer, Primary Artist
- Al Block – Performer, Primary Artist
- Don "DJ Snake" Brown - Mixing
- Horace Brown – Guest Artist, Performer
- Larry Busacca – Photography
- Josh Butler – Engineer
- Harry Wayne "K.C." Casey – Composer
- George Clinton – Composer
- Tom Coyne – Mastering
- Mike D. – Composer, Engineer, Keyboards, Producer
- Jay Da Sinnusta – Harmonica
- Diamond D – Composer, Producer
- Daz Dillinger – Featured Artist, Performer
- Jermaine Dupri – Remixing
- E-40 – Composer, Featured Artist, Guest Artist, Performer
- 8Ball and MJG – Guest Artist, Performer, Primary Artist
- Richard Finch – Composer
- Soopa Fly – Featured Artist
- G-Side – Primary Artist
- Nick Gamma – Art Direction
- Eric Gast – Engineer
- Seth Glassman – Composer
- Wellington "Tech" Gray – Engineer
- Xavier Hargrove – Composer
- Chaz Harper – Digital Editing
- Hellakilla – Primary Artist
- David Jackson – Composer
- Jay-Z – Composer, Featured Artist, Guest Artist, Performer
- Jazze Pha – Composer, Keyboards, Producer, Vocals (Background), Vocals (tracks 1, 2, 6, 7)
- Gerald Johnson – Composer
- K.B. – Additional Vocals
- Dennis Lambert – Composer
- Lil' Jon – Featured Artist, Performer, Producer
- Lil' Jon & the Eastside Boyz – Featured Artist
- Lil' Kim – Performer
- Craig Love – Guitar
- Andrew Lyn – Assistant Engineer, Mixing Assistant
- Jay Mac – Composer, Keyboards, Producer
- Juree Manning – Vocals (Background)
- Robin Mays – Engineer
- MJG – Composer, Featured Artist, Performer
- Mo-Suave – Producer
- Murda One – Performer, Primary Artist
- Kevin Parker – Engineer
- Charles Pettaway – Composer, Guitar
- Playa Playa – Performer, Primary Artist
- Brian Potter – Composer
- Puff Daddy – Featured Artist, Guest Artist, Performer
- Shabba Ranks – Featured Artist, Guest Artist, Performer
- Scarface – Composer, Featured Artist, Guest Artist, Performer
- Torrance Scott – Bass, Composer, Guitar, Guitar (Bass: tracks 6, 8, 15, 17)
- Erick Sermon – Composer, Keyboards, Producer, Programming
- Russell Simmons – Composer
- Slink Capone – Performer, Primary Artist
- Suege – Vocals (Background)
- Suge and Otis – Vocals (Background)
- T-Mix – Engineer
- Taj "Mahal" Tilghman – Composer, Drums, Engineer, Keyboards, Mixing, Producer
- Too $hort – Composer, Primary Artist
- Carlos Warlick – Engineer
- Dwayne Wiggins – Featured Artist, Guest Artist, Guitar, Performer
- Zu - Performer, Primary Artist

== Charts ==
=== Weekly charts ===
Chart (1999)	Peak position
US Billboard 200	5
US Top R&B/Hip-Hop Albums (Billboard)	1

=== Year-end charts ===
Chart (1999)	Position
US Billboard 200	165
US Top R&B/Hip-Hop Albums (Billboard)	55

== Certifications ==
Region	Certification	Certified units/sales
United States (RIAA)	Gold	500,000^{^}
^{^} Shipments figures based on certification alone.

== See also ==
- List of number-one R&B albums of 1999 (U.S.)
