= Do or Die (Ant Banks album) =

Studio album by Ant Banks
- Released: October 24, 1995
- Studio: Badass Beat Lab
- Genre: West Coast hip hop; gangsta rap
- Length: 46:03
- Label: Jive
- Producer: Ant Banks; Terry T

Ant Banks chronology
The Big Badass (1994)	Do or Die (1995)	Big Thangs (1997)

Singles from Do or Die
- 1. "I Think I Wanna Die (Losin' It)" Released: September 19, 1995

Do or Die is the third studio album by American rapper and producer Ant Banks. It was released on October 24, 1995, via Jive Records. Production was handled by Banks himself and Terry T. It features guest appearances from 187 Fac, Gangsta P, Jock, MC Breed, Mr. Ill, Rappin' Ron and Spice 1. The album debuted at number 36 on the Top R&B Albums chart in the United States.

== Track listing ==
No.	Title	Writer(s)	Producer(s)	Length
1.	"Do or Die"	Anthony Banks; Carl Martin	Ant Banks	4:06
2.	"Keep 'Em Guessin'"	Banks; Anthony Nelson; Ronald Royster	Ant Banks	4:45
3.	"It Ain't No Thang"	Banks; Terrence Butler	Terry T; Ant Banks (co.)	4:53
4.	"Sound of Lead" (featuring Spice 1 and 187 Fac)	Banks; Robert L. Green Jr.; Gregory Brown; Dennis Thomas	Ant Banks	4:28
5.	"I Think I Wanna Die (Losin' It)"	Banks; Martin	Ant Banks	5:26
6.	"Money Don't Make a Man" (featuring MC Breed)	Banks; Eric Breed	Ant Banks	4:15
7.	"You Ain't Knowin'"	Banks; Butler	Terry T; Ant Banks (co.)	4:30
8.	"Hi Speed Anthem"	Banks	Ant Banks	4:11
9.	"No Time Fa BS"	Banks; Anthony Thomas; Butler	Terry T; Ant Banks (co.)	3:42
10.	"Gafflin' Season"	Banks	Ant Banks	4:24
11.	"Bay Area Massacre" (featuring Mr. Ill, Rappin' Ron, Gangsta P and Jock)	Banks; Martin; Royster; Anton Barrett Sr.; Jock; Butler	Terry T; Ant Banks (co.)	5:18
12.	"Smokestrumental"	Banks; Elijah Baker	Ant Banks	5:13
Total length:				46:03

== Personnel ==
- Anthony "Ant" Banks – primary artist, vocals, keyboards, producer (tracks: 1, 2, 4–6, 8, 10, 12), co-producer (tracks: 3, 7, 9, 11), mixing
- Anton "Gangsta P" Barrett Sr. – featured artist, vocals (tracks: 1, 11)
- R. "Rappin' Ron" Royster – featured artist, vocals (tracks: 2, 11)
- Robert Lee "Spice 1" Greene Jr. – featured artist, vocals (track 4)
- Alvin Dennis "Den Fen" Thomas Jr. – featured artist, vocals (track 4)
- Gregory "G-Nut" Brown – featured artist, vocals (track 4)
- Eric "MC Breed" Breed – featured artist, backing vocals (track 6)
- Carl "Mr. Ill" Martin – featured artist, vocals (track 11)
- Jock – featured artist, vocals (track 11)
- Glenn "G-Stack" Jones – vocals (track 1)
- Vidal "V-White" Prevost – vocals (track 1)
- Anthony "Ant Diddley Dog" Nelson – vocals (track 2)
- Anthony Jerel "MC Ant" Thomas – vocals (track 9)
- Vickia Brinkley – backing vocals (track 1)
- Robert Toliver – backing vocals (tracks: 2, 10)
- Stacy Hogg – backing vocals (track 7)
- Tempest – backing vocals (track 9)
- John "Jubu" Smith – guitar (track 1)
- Elijah Baker – guitar (tracks: 4, 12)
- Terrence "Terry T" Butler – producer (tracks: 3, 7, 9, 11)
- Tom Coyne – mastering

== Charts ==
Chart (1995)	Peak position
US Top R&B Albums (Billboard)	36
