= Whodini (album) =

Studio album by Whodini
- Released: October 13, 1983
- Recorded: 1982–1983
- Studio: Battery Studios (London, England); Can Studios (Weilerswist, Germany)
- Genre: Hip-hop
- Length: 44:39
- Label: Jive
- Producer: Willesden Dodgers; Thomas Dolby; Conny Plank; Roy Carter

Whodini chronology
Whodini (1983)	Escape (1984)

Singles from Whodini
- 1. "Magic's Wand" Released: 1982; 2. "The Haunted House of Rock" Released: May 1983

Whodini is the debut studio album by American hip-hop group Whodini, released on October 13, 1983, by Jive Records. It spawned two hit singles: 1982 single "Magic's Wand" and 1983 single "The Haunted House of Rock". Audio production was handled by Conny Plank, Heatwave's Roy Carter, Thomas Dolby, and the Willesden Dodgers (Nigel Green, Pete Q. Harris, Richard Jon Smith).

== Release ==
The album itself did not reach any major music chart. However, Thomas Dolby-produced single "Magic's Wand" peaked at number 11 on the US Dance Club Songs chart and number 45 on the Hot R&B/Hip-Hop Songs and Willesden Dodgers-produced track "The Haunted House of Rock" peaked at number 27 on the Dance Club Songs and number 55 on the Hot R&B/Hip-Hop Songs.

== Critical reception ==
Professional ratings
Review scores
Source	Rating
AllMusic	3/5 stars
The Philadelphia Inquirer	4/5 stars

From a contemporary review, Ken Tucker of The Philadelphia Inquirer gave the album four stars out of five, stating that "Unlike so many dance-club hit makers, Whodini can sustain its cleverness over the length of an entire album."

== Track listing ==
Side one
No.	Title	Writer(s)	Producer(s)	Length
1.	"The Haunted House of Rock"	J. Hutchins; N. Green; P. Harris	Willesden Dodgers	6:31
2.	"Nasty Lady"	C. Plank; J. Fletcher; J. Hutchins	Conny Plank	5:52
3.	"Underground"	J. Fletcher; J. Hutchins; P. Harris	Roy Carter; Willesden Dodgers	5:42
4.	"It's All in Mr. Magic's Wand"	M. Seligman; T. Dolby	Thomas Dolby	4:43

Side two
No.	Title	Writer(s)	Producer(s)	Length
5.	"Magic's Wand"	J. Hutchins; J. Rivas; T. Dolby	Thomas Dolby	5:38
6.	"Yours for a Night"	J. Fletcher; J. Hutchins; T. Pearse	Roy Carter; Willesden Dodgers	5:57
7.	"Rap Machine"	C. Plank; J. Fletcher; J. Hutchins	Conny Plank	4:49
8.	"The Haunted House of Rock" (Remix)	J. Hutchins; N. Green; P. Harris	Willesden Dodgers	5:23
Total length:				44:39

== Personnel ==
Musicians

- Jalil Hutchins — performer
- John "Ecstasy" Fletcher — performer
- Thomas Jerome Pearse — additional vocals (track 6)

Technical

- Nigel Green — producer (tracks: 1, 3, 6, 8), mixing (tracks: 1, 4, 5, 8)
- Peter Brian Harris — producer (tracks: 1, 3, 6, 8)
- Richard Jon Smith — producer (tracks: 1, 3, 6, 8)
- Konrad "Conny" Plank — producer and mixing (tracks: 2, 7)
- Roy Peter Carter — producer (tracks: 3, 6)
- Thomas Dolby — producer (tracks: 4, 5)
- Bryan Chuck New — engineer (tracks: 3, 6)
- Sönke Bahns — mastering
- John Pinderhughes — photography
- Matt Wallis — tape operator
