= Derty Werk =

Studio album by T.W.D.Y.
- Released: April 20, 1999
- Studio: The Cuttaluff (Oakland, California)
- Genre: West Coast hip hop; gangsta rap
- Length: 1:01:16
- Label: Thump Street
- Producer: Ant Banks (also exec.)

T.W.D.Y. chronology
Derty Werk (1999)	Lead the Way (2000)

Singles from Derty Werk
- 1. "Players Holiday" Released: 1999; 2. "Drinks on Me / Players Holiday Remixes" Released: July 27, 1999

Ant Banks Presents T.W.D.Y.: Derty Werk is the debut studio album by American hip hop supergroup T.W.D.Y. (The Whole Damn Yay). It was released on April 20, 1999, via Thump Street Records. Production was handled entirely by member Ant Banks, who also served as executive producer. It features guest appearances from Otis & Shug, Gripsta, Playa Metro, Too $hort, Agerman, B-Legit, CJ Mac, Dolla Will, J-Dubb, Keak da Sneak, Mac Mall, Mac Shawn, MC Ant, Pooh-Man and Spice 1.

The album debuted at number 135 on the Billboard 200 and at number 41 on the Top R&B/Hip-Hop Albums in the United States. Its lead single, "Players Holiday", peaked at number 90 on the Billboard Hot 100 and become the group's most successful single, with music video starring all the three T.W.D.Y. members Ant Banks, Rappin' 4-Tay and Captain Save 'Em, as well as Mac Mall, Too $hort, Otis & Shug, E-40 and Ray Luv. The album's second single, "Drinks on Me", made it to number 18 on the Hot Rap Songs chart.

Banks settled his rivalry with MC Pooh-Man when they appeared together on the song "Ride Wit Me". The album is dedicated to Anthony "M.C. Ant" Thomas, who was killed in early 1999 and made his posthumous appearance on the song "Shook Niggas".

== Critical reception ==
Professional ratings
Review scores
Source	Rating
AllMusic	2/5 stars
The Source	3/5 stars

Derty Werk received mixed reviews from music critics. AllMusic called it a "stellar compilation album". Tony Green of The Source criticized it for the lack of originality, saying that it "offers little besides Range Rover-friendly bass, and Banks's now familiar live instrument and vocal flourishes".

== Track listing ==
No.	Title	Writer(s)	Length
1.	"Intro"		0:36
2.	"Cross Me Up" (featuring Keak da Sneak)		3:14
3.	"The Game" (featuring B-Legit, J-Dubb & Mac Shawn)		4:34
4.	"Pervin" (featuring Too $hort & E-40)	Anthony Banks; Anthony Forté; Kevin Dixson; Todd Shaw; Earl Stevens; George Clinton; William Earl Collins; Phelps Collins	5:28
5.	"Gotta Have Heart" (featuring Metro)		3:36
6.	"Squeeze Onem" (featuring Gripsta)	Banks; Forté; A. Harris	3:13
7.	"Interlude"		0:44
8.	"Shook Niggas" (featuring Spice 1, Dolla Will, MC Ant & Metro)		3:49
9.	"Drinks on Me"	Banks; Dixson	3:45
10.	"Out 2 Get Me" (featuring Otis & Shug)		3:55
11.	"Players Holiday" (featuring Too $hort & Mac Mall)	Banks; Forté; Dixson; Shaw; Jamal Rocker; William Harrison Withers; Clarence Alexander Scarborough	5:02
12.	"On the Reala" (featuring CJ Mac & Agerman)	Banks; Bryaan Ross; Ramone Curtis	3:47
13.	"Interlude"		0:34
14.	"I Can't Change"		3:55
15.	"Stragglas"	Banks; Dixson	4:40
16.	"Ride Wit Me" (featuring Pooh-Man)		5:07
17.	"Gameless Mortals" (featuring Gripsta)		5:17
Total length:			1:01:16

Sample credits

- Track 11 contains an interpolation of "Lovely Day" by Bill Withers

Notes

- Tracks 11, 14 and 16 feature backing vocals from Otis Cooper
- Tracks 11 and 16 feature backing vocals from Rafael "Shugg" Howell
- Track 15 features backing vocals from Stacy Hogg

== Chart history ==
Chart (1999)	Peak position
US Billboard 200	135
US Top R&B/Hip-Hop Albums (Billboard)	41

=== Singles chart positions ===
Year	Song	Chart positions			
Year	Song	US Hot 100	US R&B	US Rap	US Rhythmic
1999	"Players Holiday"	90	38	5	15
1999	"Drinks on Me"	—	—	18	—
