= Baby DC =

American rapper (born 1986)

- Also known as: Baby D; DC
- Born: Derek Coleman; January 7, 1986 (age 40); Oakland, California, United States
- Genres: Hip hop
- Occupation: Rapper
- Instrument: Vocals
- Years active: 1991–2001
- Labels: Short; Jive

Derek Coleman (born January 7, 1986), better known by his stage name Baby DC, is a former American child rapper from Oakland, California. He was signed to Too Short's record label Short Records, and Jive Records.

== Career ==
Coleman, who first started rapping at the age of five years, made his first official appearance on Too Short's 1995 album, Cocktails on the track "Thangs Change" with fellow kid rappers, Illegal. That same year he recorded his first solo track "Can I Get Loose", which appeared on The Dangerous Crew's Don't Try This at Home. In 1998, the now 12-year-old rapper became the first to sign to Too Short's short-lived record label, $hort Records. He released his debut album, School Dayz, on September 29, 1998, which spawned the minor hit, "Bounce, Rock, Skate, Roll". The track peaked at #45 in the UK Singles Chart in April 1999.

== Discography ==
=== Studio albums ===
List of studio albums, with year released
Title	Album details
School Dayz	Released: September 29, 1998; Label: $hort, Jive; Formats: CD, cassette, digital download, LP

=== Guest appearances ===
List of non-single guest appearances, with other performing artists, showing year released and album name
Title	Year	Artist(s)	Album
"Thangs Change"	1995	Too Short, Mr. Malik, Jamal	Cocktails
"Can I Get Loose"	1995	—N/a	Don't Try This at Home
"Let It Go"	2000	TWDY, DenGee, T-Pup, Butch Cassidy	Lead the Way
"U Stank"	2001	Too Short, George Clinton	Chase the Cat
