= Ant Banks =

American rapper and record producer

- Born: Anthony Banks; May 16, 1969 (age 57); Oakland, California, U.S.
- Genres: West Coast hip hop; gangsta rap; G-funk
- Occupations: Record producer; rapper; songwriter
- Years active: 1987–present
- Labels: Dangerous Music; Jive; Priority
- Formerly of: The Dangerous Crew; T.W.D.Y.

Anthony Banks (born May 16, 1969) is an American record producer and rapper from Oakland, California.

== Discography ==
=== Studio albums ===
- Sittin' On Somethin' Phat (1993)
- The Big Badass (1994)
- Do Or Die (1995)

=== Collaboration albums ===
- Don't Try This At Home with The Dangerous Crew (1995)
- Derty Werk with T.W.D.Y. (1999)
- Lead The Way with T.W.D.Y. (2000)

=== Compilation albums ===
- Big Thangs (1997)
- The Best Of Ant Banks (1998)

== Production discography ==
1989

- MC Ant - The Great

1990

- Pooh-Man - Teardrops (EP)
- Pooh-Man - Life Of A Criminal

1991

- Spice 1 - Let It Be Known (EP)
- Various Artists - Juice
- Dangerous Dame - The Bomb (Single)

1992

- Dangerous Dame - Same Ole Dame
- Pooh-Man - Funky As I Wanna Be
- Spice 1 - Spice 1
- Too Short - Shorty the Pimp

1993

- Dru Down - Fools From The Streets
- Spice 1 - 187 He Wrote
- Too Short - Get in Where You Fit In
- Various Artists - Menace II Society

1994

- Dru Down - Explicit Game
- Goldy - In The Land of Funk
- Rappin' 4-Tay - Don't Fight the Feelin'
- Spice 1 - AmeriKKKa's Nightmare
- Various Artists - B-Ball's Best Kept Secret

1995

- Gangsta P - Meet The Lil Gangsta
- Rappin' Ron & Ant Diddley Dog - Bad N-Fluenz
- South Central Cartel - Murder Squad Nationwide
- Spice 1 - 1990-Sick
- Too Short - Cocktails/ Don't Try This At Home

1996

- C.R.I.S.I.S. - Crazy Real Insane Soldiers In Sacramento
- E-40 - Tha Hall of Game
- Mac Mall - Untouchable
- Mr. ILL - Rebirth
- Too Short - Gettin' It
- Various Artists - America Is Dying Slowly
- Various Artists - NFM Jams

1997

- 187 Fac - Fac Not Fiction
- 3X Krazy - Stackin' Chips
- Mack 10 - Based on a True Story
- MC Breed - Flatline
- Rappin' 4-Tay - 4 Tha Hard Way
- Spice 1 - The Black Bossalini (a.k.a. Dr. Bomb from Da Bay)
- Various Artists - In tha Beginning…There Was Rap

1998

- Bad Azz - Word on tha Streets
- E-40 - The Element of Surprise
- Eightball - Lost
- MC Ren - Ruthless for Life
- No Limit- Major Players Compilation
- Rappin' 4-Tay - Bigga Than Da Game
- WC - The Shadiest One
- Various Artists - Straight Outta Compton: N.W.A 10th Anniversary Tribute
- Various Artists - Woo

1999

- B-Legit - Hempin' Ain't Easy
- CJ Mac - Platinum Game
- E-40 - Charlie Hustle: The Blueprint of a Self-Made Millionaire
- MC Eiht - Section 8
- Snoop Dogg - No Limit Top Dogg
- Suge Knight - Represents: Chronic 2000
- Too Short - Can't Stay Away
- Keak Da Sneak - Sneakacydal

2000

- Captain Save 'Em - My Cape is in the Cleaners
- Dual Committee - Dual Committee
- Too Short - You Nasty
- Various Artists - Romeo Must Die
- Various Artists - Too Gangsta for Radio

2001

- The Click - Money & Muscle
- Too Short - Chase the Cat
- Keak Da Sneak - Hi-Tek

2002

- Celly Cel - Song'z U Can't Find
- King T - The Kingdom Come
- Too Short - What's My Favorite Word?

2003

- Too Short - Married to the Game

2004

- E-40 - The Best of E-40: Yesterday, Today and Tomorrow
- Hussein Fatal - Fatalveli, Volume 2: The Mixtape

2007

- V-White - Perfect Timin'

2019

- Dann G & MC Magic - Special Lady

2020

- Too Short & E-40 - "Triple Gold Sox"
- Candyman - BLM? Aka Don't Shoot
- Dru Down - Livin Legend (God Willin), Pt. 1

2021

- Chris Lockett - Man Up
- Chris Lockett - Stay With Me

2022

- Mount Westmore - Snoop Cube 40 $hort
- Khoree The Poet - All On Me
- Khoree The Poet - Grown Man Ish

=== 2023 ===
- J-Dee - The Pay Back Project
- Kokane & Suga Free - SugaKane

=== 2024 ===
- Kokane - Da Funkin Adventures of Dr. Kokanstine

=== 2025 ===
- Too Short - Sir Too $hort Vol. I (Freaky Tales)
