= Slink Johnson =

American actor (born 1973)

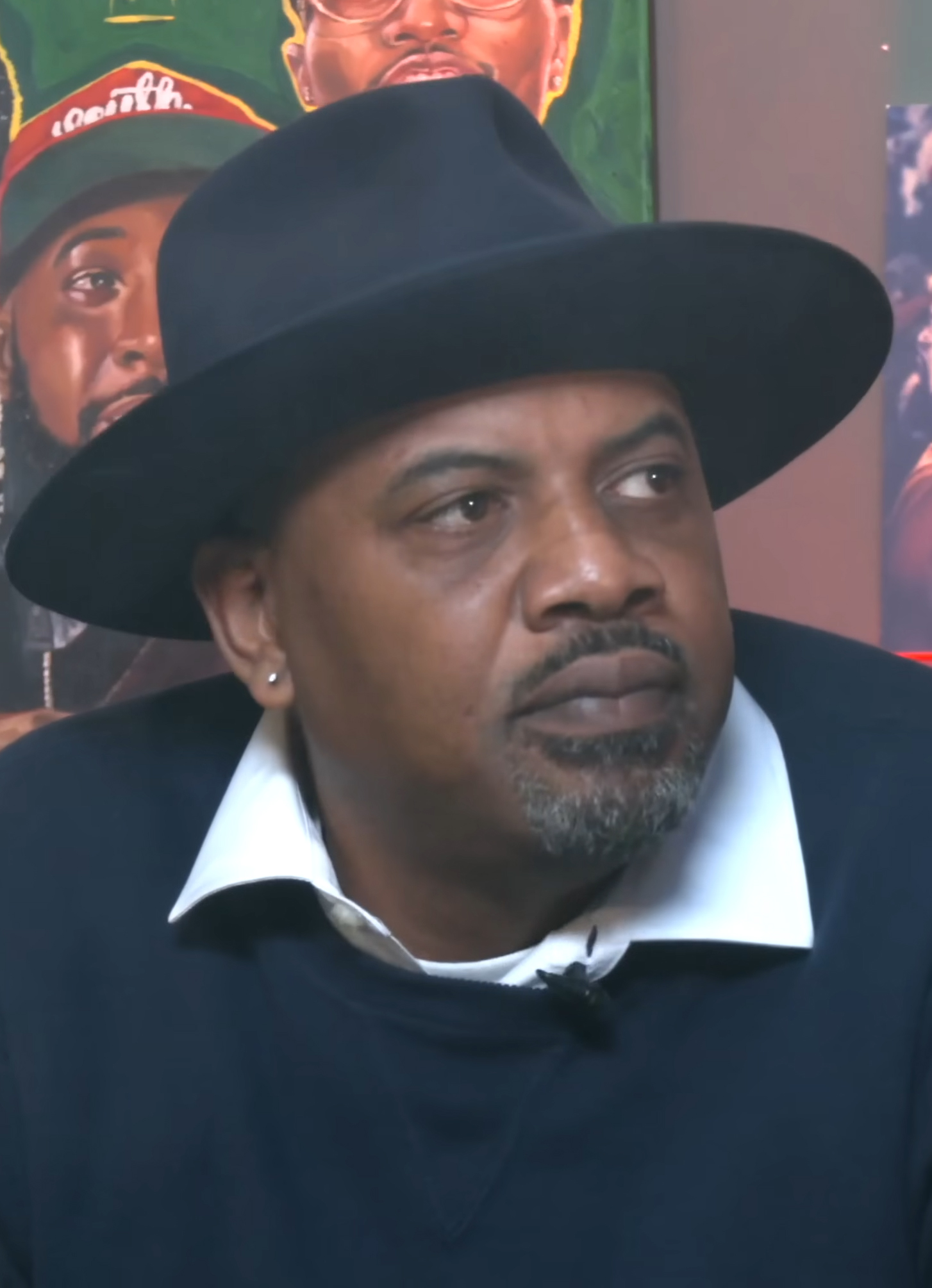
- Johnson in 2021
- Born: Gerald Anthony Johnson; January 31, 1973 (age 53); Dumas, Arkansas, U.S.
- Other name: Slink Capone
- Occupation: Actor
- Years active: 2007–present

Gerald Anthony "Slink" Johnson (born January 31, 1973), also known by his stage name Slink Capone, is an American actor and stand-up comedian. He starred in the sitcom Black Jesus and portrayed Lamar Davis in the 2013 video games Grand Theft Auto V and Grand Theft Auto Online.

== Career ==
=== Grand Theft Auto V ===
Johnson voiced the character Lamar Davis for the 2013 video game Grand Theft Auto V. In 2021, Johnson reprised his role alongside Shawn Fonteno (who voiced Franklin Clinton in the same game) in a live-action re-enactment of a cutscene where Lamar "roasts" Franklin. The original scene had experienced a resurgence in popularity years later when parodies were uploaded online, usually involving Lamar's character model being replaced with various popular culture icons. Later that year, Fonteno and Johnson again reprised their roles in downloadable content for Grand Theft Auto Online, which included a homage to the original roast cutscene.

== Filmography ==
=== Film ===
Year	Title	Role	Notes
2007	Gangsta Rap: The Glockumentary	Murder Mike	
2008	The Super Rumble Mixshow	Black Jesus	Short
2010	Freaknik: The Musical	Virgil's Boss (voice)	TV movie
2011	G Code: Check Yo Nuts	G Code Man	Short
2012	Highway	Budtender	
2015	Meet My Valentine	Emcee	TV movie
2015	Sharknado 3: Oh Hell No!	Lieutenant Jared	TV movie
2016	Pre-Nig	The Narrator	Short
2016	Major Deal	Uber Passenger 1	
2017	White Girl Voice	G	Short
2017	The Outdoorsman	Jimmy	
2018	DWB: Dating While Black	Dontae	
2019	Kevin Hart's Guide to Black History	William Tillman	
2019	Pantervention	Spokesperson	Video
2019	Perfectly Single	Pat	
2020	John Henry	Gun	
2020	A Compton Story	-	Short
2020	Baby Gangsta	Detective Coleman	
2020	Purgatory Court	Judge Abandon	Short
2021	Why She Keep Scratchin'?	Leandro/Slink	Short
2021	Space Jam: A New Legacy	Warner Bros. Security Guard	
2021	Dirty Cops L.A.	Capt. Clay Davis	
2021	Apocalypshit	Sugary	
2021	Social Disturbance	Detective Mitchell	
2021	5150	Himself	Short
2022	For the 1st Time	Dr. Raymond Pipe	
2023	White Men Can’t Jump	Lamont	
2023	Kings of L.A.	Mike-Mike	
2023	The Thot of Murder	Mike	
2024	Drugstore June	Joe the Bouncer	
2024	I Left My Heart in Colombia	Wendell	
2025	The Greatest Love Story	Contest Host	Short

=== Television ===
Year	Title	Role	Notes
2010	The Boondocks	Lando (voice)	Episode: "The Story of Lando Freeman"
2014	Community Service	Dwayne Tate	Main Cast
2014–19	Black Jesus	Black Jesus a.k.a. Fredrick	Main Cast
2015	Six Guys One Car	Andre	Episode: "Under New Management"
2016	The Christian Show	Lamar Davis	Recurring Cast: Season 2
2017	Ad-TV	Himself	Episode: "Episode #1.1" & "#1.3"
2017	Dead House	Clarence	Main Cast
2018	The 5th Quarter	Jesus	Episode: "The Sports Gods"
2018–19	For Evan's Sake	Cornell Beaverwetter	Main Cast
2019	The Jellies!	Charlie (voice)	Recurring Cast: Season 2
2019	Sugar and Toys	Hypeman	Episode: "The Every Damn Internet Challenge Challenge"
2019	Broken Ground	-	Episode: "The Big Payback"
2019	Stingers	Officer #1	Episode: "Drink Up"
2019	Just Roommates	Jamarcus Brown	Episode: "The After Party"
2019–20	Locs	Tall Cuz	Main Cast
2020	Roomies	Himself	Episode: "The One With Slink Johnson: Part 1 & 2"
2022	KXNG D.O.P.E.	Dad	Recurring Cast
2024	Good Times: Black Again	Dalvin Evans (voice)	Main Cast
2025	Fire	Troy	Main Cast
2025	Lil Kev	Henry (voice)	Recurring Cast

=== Video games ===
Year	Title	Role	Notes
2013	Grand Theft Auto V	Lamar Davis	Voice and motion-capture
2013	Grand Theft Auto Online	Lamar Davis	Voice and motion-capture
2015	Grand Theft Auto Online	Lamar Davis	Voice and motion-capture; Lowriders content update
2021	Grand Theft Auto Online	Lamar Davis	Voice and motion-capture; The Contract content update

=== Web ===
Year	Title	Role	Notes
2021	The Original GTA V: Lamar Roasts Franklin in Real-Life	Lamar Davis	YouTube video; live-action re-enactment
