= Don't Try This at Home (The Dangerous Crew album) =

Compilation album by Dangerous Crew
- Released: November 21, 1995
- Genre: West Coast hip hop; gangsta rap
- Length: 72:20
- Label: Dangerous; Jive
- Producer: Ant Banks; Father Dom; J-Dubb; L.A. Dre; Pee-Wee; Shorty B

The Dangerous Crew chronology
Dangerous Crew (1988)	Don't Try This at Home (1995)

Singles from Don't Try This at Home
- 1. "Buy You Some" Released: 1995

Don't Try This at Home is a compilation presented by American rap group The Dangerous Crew. It was released November 21, 1995, on Jive Records and Dangerous Music. The album was produced by Ant Banks, Father Dom, J-Dubb, L.A. Dre, Pee-Wee and Shorty B. It peaked at number 191 on the U.S. Billboard 200, at number 6 on the Billboard Top Heatseekers and at number 23 on the Billboard Top R&B/Hip-Hop Albums. The album features performances by Too Short, Spice 1, MC Breed, Erick Sermon and Goldy.

== Critical reception ==
Professional ratings
Review scores
Source	Rating
Allmusic	3/5 stars

Allmusic – "The Dangerous Crew's Don't Try This at Home...is a thoroughly enjoyable collection of West Coast hip-hop...the Dangerous Crew has a stellar lineup of MCs and they all contribute their fair share of first-rate rhymes. The production doesn't show much imagination, yet the personalities manage to make Don't Try This at Home an entertaining record."

== Track listing ==
#	Title	Performers	Producers	Time
1	"Leave It Alone"	Too Short	Shorty B	5:21
2	"Welcome to the Bay"	Shorty B; Collision; Pee-Wee	Shorty B; Pee-Wee	6:00
3	"Out for the Props"	Shorty B	Shorty B	6:38
4	"Gone With the Wind"	Pee-Wee	Shorty B; Pee-Wee	4:23
5	"Trouble (Scared to Blast)"	Too Short; Spice 1; J-Dubb	J-Dubb	5:06
6	"Buy You Some"	Too Short; Erick Sermon	Shorty B	2:40
7	"Joe Riz"	Joe Riz	Shorty B	1:21
8	"Freddy B"	Freddy B	Pee-Wee	4:53
9	"Can I Get Loose"	Baby D	Ant Banks	1:15
10	"You Crossed Me"	Goldy	Pee-Wee	5:37
11	"Moan"	About Face	L.A. Dre	4:44
12	"Funk Session"	Too Short; Shock G	Shorty B	6:00
13	"Weed Break"	MC Breed	Shorty B	1:11
14	"Pimpin's Just In Me"	Doo Doo Brown	Shorty B	1:33
15	"I Was Only Tryin' to Get Mine"	Blacked Up	L.A. Dre	5:33
16	"Rumors"	Father Dom	Father Dom; Pee-Wee; Shorty B	4:38
17	"Don't Try This at Home"	Shorty B	Shorty B	5:27

== Chart history ==
Chart (1995)	Peak position
U.S. Billboard 200	191
U.S. Billboard Top Heatseekers	6
U.S. Billboard Top R&B/Hip-Hop Albums	23

== Personnel ==
- About Face – performer
- Ant Banks – mixing
- Brian Haught – keyboards, engineer, Digital Editing
- Catfish – engineer
- Collision – performer
- Doo Doo Brown – performer
- Erick Sermon – vocals, performer
- Freddy B – performer
- Father Dom – performer
- Goldy – performer
- MC Breed – performer
- Michael Hampton – guitar
- Pee-Wee – performer, producer, keyboards
- Ramone "Pee Wee" Gooden – performer
- Sean Brown – vocals
- Shock-G – performer
- Shorty B. – performer, producer, bass Guitar
- Spice 1 – performer
- Stan – engineer
- Taj Tilghman – engineer
- Tom Coyne – Mastering
- Too Short – performer
