= Pooh-Man =

American rapper (born 1969)

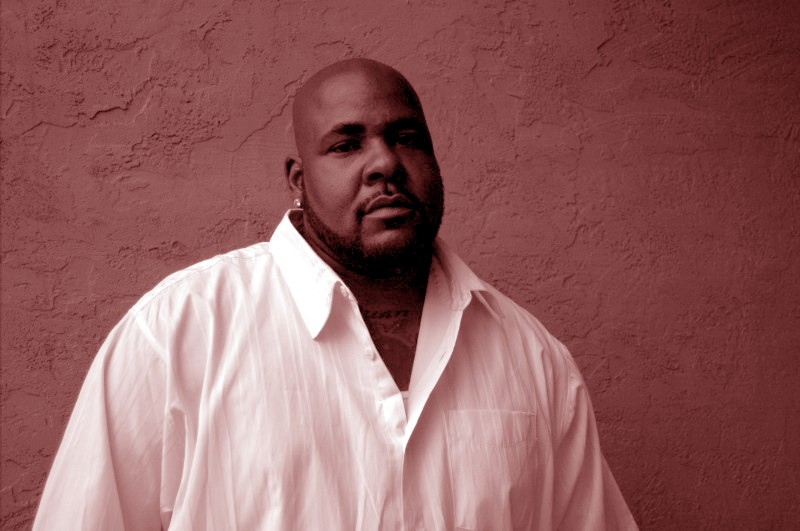
- Pooh-Man in 2014

Background information
- Also known as: MC Pooh
- Born: Lawrence Lee Thomas; January 25, 1969 (age 57)
- Origin: Oakland, California, U.S.
- Genres: Hip hop; gangsta rap
- Years active: 1985-present
- Labels: Jive; Scarface; In-A-Minute; Killa Kali; AniraMusic

Lawrence Lee Thomas (born January 25, 1969), known professionally as Pooh-Man or MC Pooh, is an American rapper. With lyrics focused on topics of sex, money and murder, his namesake song ("Sex, Money & Murder") appeared on the soundtrack to the 1992 film Juice. He also played Doc in the 1993 film Menace II Society.

Active since the early 1990s, he signed with Jive Records to release his first two albums, Life as a Criminal (1990) and Funky as I Wanna Be (1993); the latter marked his only entry on the Billboard 200 and gained notoriety for its risque cover art.

On February 28, 2000, Thomas plead guilty to one count of bank robbery and was condemned to 6 years in prison.

== Discography ==
| Year | Title | Label | Peak chart positions | |
| Year | Title | Label | US R&B/HH | US |
|---|---|---|---|---|
| 1990 | Life of a Criminal | Jive | 39 | — |
| 1992 | Funky As I Wanna Be | Jive | 38 | 158 |
| 1993 | Judgement Day | Scarface | 57 | — |
| 1994 | Ain't No Love | In-A-Minute | 85 | — |
| 1997 | State Vs. Pooh-Man Straight from San Quentin | In-A-Minute | — | — |
| 2001 | Fukin' Wit Dank 2001 | Killa Kali | — | — |
| 2014 | Kaos Theory | Infinite Kaos | — | — |
| 2017 | Cookies n'Drank | No More Tears | — | — |
