= Goldy (rapper) =

American rapper (born 1969)

Mhisani Miller (born 1969), better known by his stage name Goldy, is an American rapper from The Dangerous Crew. He is from the East Bay. He released his first album, Call It Like I See It, under his real name, Mhisani.

== Discography ==
=== Studio albums ===
- Call It Like I See It (1991) (as Mhisani)
- In the Land of Funk (1994)
- The Golden Rules (1998)

=== Collaboration albums ===
- Don't Try This at Home with The Dangerous Crew (1995)
