= The Dangerous Crew =

American hip hop group

- Origin: Oakland, California, U.S.
- Genres: West Coast hip-hop
- Years active: 1988–1996
- Labels: Dangerous; Jive
- Past members: Too Short: Shorty B; Pee-Wee; Ant Banks; Sean G; Goldy; Rappin' Ron; Ant Diddley Dog; Spice 1; Father Dom; Dangerous Dame; Rappin' 4-Tay

The Dangerous Crew was an American hip hop band formed by Oakland, California rapper and producer Todd "Too Short" Shaw. The Dangerous Crew consisted of both live musicians and rappers: Stuart "Shorty B" Jordan (bass, guitar, drums), Ramone "Pee-Wee" Gooden (keyboards, drums, guitar), Anthony "Ant" Banks (keyboards, drum programming, mixing), Sean G (live drums), and rappers Too Short, Mhisani "Goldy" Miller, FM Blue, Dangerous Dame, Rohnie "Rappin' Ron" Royster, Ant Diddley Dog, Robert "Spice 1" Green Jr., Rappin' 4-Tay and Damani "Father Dom" Khaleel. The Dangerous Crew also had an R&B group known as About Face, who appeared on a few of the later releases by Too Short.

== Discography ==
=== Studio albums ===
Title	Release	Peak chart positions		
Title	Release	US	US R&B	US Heat.
Dangerous Crew	Released: 1988; Label: Dangerous Music	—	—	—
Don't Try This at Home	Released: November 21, 1995; Label: Jive Records	191	23	6

=== Rappin' Ron & Ant Diddley Dog ===
Title	Release	Peak chart positions
Title	Release	US R&B
Bad-N-Fluenz	Released: February 21, 1995; Label: Cell Block Records	83
