= Gripsta =

American rapper

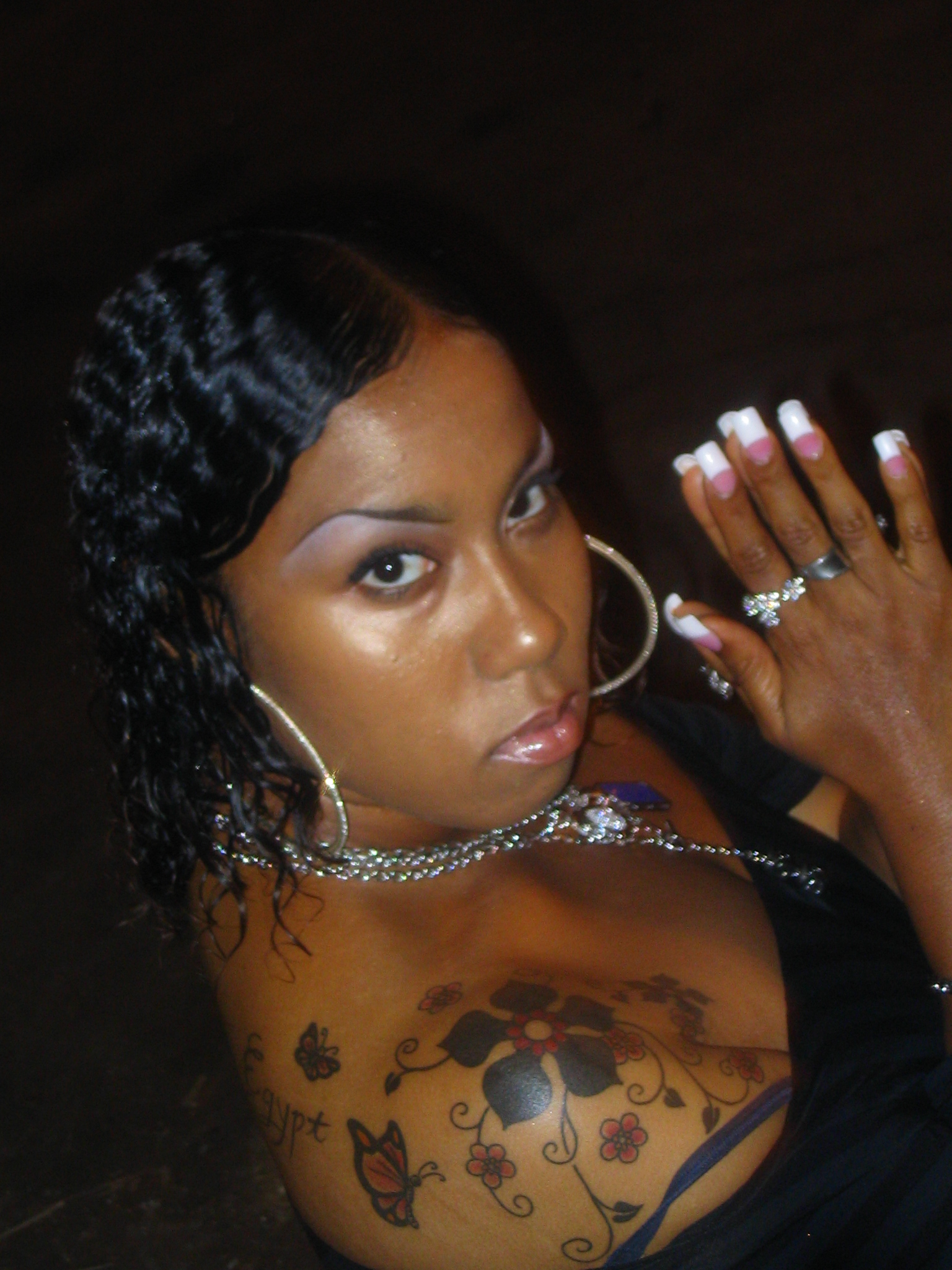
- Gripsta in 1999

Background information
- Also known as: Grip; Gripsta
- Born: Brandi Younger; August 20, 1978 (age 47)
- Origin: Oakland, Ca
- Genres: Hip hop music
- Occupation: Rapper/ Actor
- Years active: 1993–present
- Labels: Rhyme Syndicate productions, Tuff Break-A&M Records

Brandi Younger, professionally known by her stage name Gripsta, is an Oakland-born female rapper. Discovered by Ice-T at the age of 13, she was featured on song titled "Funky Gripsta" off of his 1993 album Home Invasion and later signed to Tuff Break/A&M Records in the 1990s. Her debut single "Pop Goz the 9" was partially leaked in January 1994, its music video was directed by Ice-T. However Gripsta's debut single was never officially released. The Tuff Break label on A&M Records was dropped before her scheduled release date. She was later featured on Ice-T's seventh solo studio album The Seventh Deadly Sin, as well as numerous features on record label Def Jam's The Murder Squad album. She worked with many artists under that association. She was featured on song "Knock on Wood" alongside Grammy award winning L.V. of South Central Cartel (who won a Grammy in 1995 for his feature on Coolio’s “Gangsta's Paradise”) South Central Cartel, B.G. Knocc Out, Dresta, Jayo Felony, Young Murder Squad and Sh’killa.

Gripsta was also featured in a principal role in the movie Dangerous Minds in which she played one of the many troubled teens that actress Michelle Pfeiffer sought to reform. Other acting credits include a guest star appearance in the "Leaving the Life" episode of the CBS television show Promised Land, a semi popular spin-off of CBS more successful show Touched by an Angel.'. As of June 2023 Gripsta released a video on YouTube. This video “This is Cali” is an answer to new female rapper Scarlip “This is New York”. This song details the harsh realities of gang life and dangers of California.

== Discography ==
=== Singles ===
- "Pop Goz the 9"/"Can't Fade This" (1994)

=== Guest appearances ===
Title	Release	Other artist(s)	Album
"Funky Gripsta"	1993	Ice-T	Home Invasion
"Knock on Wood"	1995	South Central Cartel, Sh'Killa	Murder Squad Nationwide
"Knock on Wood (Video Version)"	1995	The Evil Side G's, Sh'Killa, B.G. Knocc Out, Dresta, Jayo Felony, L.V.	non-album single
"Female Rydaz"	1996	Sh'Killa	Gangstrez From Da Bay
"Now U Wanna Come Back (Reunited We're Not)"	1996	Sh'Killa	Gangstrez From Da Bay
"Whatever It Takes"	1996	Sh'Killa, Young Murder Squad	Gangstrez From Da Bay
"Hardcore"	1999	Ice-T	Seventh Deadly Sin
"Squeeze On'em"	1999	T.W.D.Y.	Derty Werk
"Gameless Mortals"	1999	T.W.D.Y.	Derty Werk
"Livin"	1999	Factor	Tha Bomb Connect
"Nasty"	2000	Celly Cel	Deep Conversation
"Boss Bitches"	2000	T.W.D.Y., Sylk-E. Fyne, Conscious Daughters	Lead the Way
"Hot Shit"	2002	Skant	Bread and Born

== Videography ==
Music videos

Title	Release	Other artist(s)	Album
"Pop Goz the 9"	1994		non-album single
"Knock on Wood (Video Version)"	1995	The Evil Side G's, Sh'Killa, B.G. Knocc Out, Dresta, Jayo Felony, L.V.	Murder Squad Nationwide
