= Dresta =

American rapper

Gangsta Dresta
- Also known as: Gangsta Dresta; Dresta Da Gangsta; Big Dre; Dre'sta; Dresta
- Born: André DéSean Wicker; April 18, 1970 (age 56); Compton, California, U.S.
- Genres: Hip-hop; gangsta rap; West Coast hip-hop
- Occupations: Rapper; songwriter
- Years active: 1993–present
- Labels: Def Jam; Outburst; Ruthless

André DéSean Wicker (born April 18, 1970), better known by his stage name Gangsta Dresta, is an American rapper. He is best known for collaborating with Eazy-E on the 1993 single "Real Muthaphuckkin G's".

He is the older brother of rapper B.G. Knocc Out, who is also featured on the song. Together, they released their only studio album Real Brothas, in August 1995, which peaked at #128 on the Billboard 200. In 1996, the pair appeared on the remixed version of the South Central Cartel song, "Knock on Wood".

== Early life ==
Andre Wicker was born and raised in Nutty Blocc in Compton, California. He and his brother Arlandis Hinton, also known as B.G. Knocc Out, became Nutty Blocc Compton Crips, a Crip set from the West Coast neighborhood of the same name. He was convicted of assaulting another gang member in Compton in 1988, and was incarcerated at the California Youth Authority in Camarillo until 1993.

== Music career ==
While Dresta was serving his five-year sentence, he started writing lyrics and rapping, gaining some notoriety. Within months of Dresta's release, he and B.G. Knocc Out signed to Eazy-E's Ruthless Records and made their debut on Eazy's 1993 multi-platinum EP It's On (~~Dr. Dre~~) 187^{um} Killa on the single "Real Muthaphuckkin G's" (which was censored to "Real Compton City G's" in order to garner MTV and radio airplay). The song itself was a response to Dr. Dre and Snoop Dogg's various 'diss' records towards Eazy-E on Dr. Dre's debut album, The Chronic. Dresta also appeared on the track "Boyz N Tha Hood (G-Mix).

In 1994, B.G. Knocc Out and Dresta began working on a collaboration album and also featured on fellow Ruthless Records duo Menajahtwa's debut album Cha-Licious. In 1995, Dresta and B.G. Knocc Out released their debut studio album Real Brothas, which remains their only album to date. It debuted and peaked at #128 on the Billboard 200 and moved 300,000 copies without any promotion. The album spawned the minor hit singles "Jealousy" and "50/50 Luv". The duo also featured on a remix of the song "Knock On Wood".

At the start of 1996, they made three guest appearances in Eazy-E's posthumous album Str8 off tha Streetz of Muthaphukkin Compton, including features on the diss track "Ole School Shit" and the single "Sippin' on a 40" and also featured on DJ Yella's debut album One Mo Nigga ta Go. The duo continued to record music together until B.G. Knocc Out's incarceration for attempted murder in 1998 which ended the duo. That same year, Dresta featured on the title track of the album Straight Outta Compton: N.W.A 10th Anniversary Tribute. In 1999, Dresta began working with Death Row Records and appeared on two tracks from Death Row's Too Gangsta for Radio compilation, but never actually signed to the record label.

Dresta stated in an interview that he is currently working on Dirty West mixtape series and on upcoming solo album, hinting possibility of Real Brothas to get re-released. Dresta also wrote a song for Dr. Dre's album Detox, but Dre didn't want to collaborate with him. He criticized Dr. Dre for surrounding himself with mediocre artists and the numerous delays of his Detox album. From 2012 onwards, multiple previously unreleased songs by him and B.G. Knocc Out which were recorded from 1994 to 1997 were released.

== Personal life ==
=== 1994 shooting ===
On January 14, 1994, Tyrone Thomas (also known as Tony Bogard), Andre Wicker and Rodney Compton were involved in a gang confrontation in Imperial Courts housing projects. Thomas and Compton were former PeeJay Watts Crips and Thomas had helped to organize a truce between Crips and Bloods in Watts, Los Angeles in 1992.

At around 6:30 p.m., a shooting began in a parking lot in the 2200 block of East 114th Street. 25 shots were fired, six of which hit Thomas, who was said to be the prime target of the shooting. According to witnesses, Thomas was carrying a pistol and he shot back at the assailants, possibly wounding two of them.

Thomas and Wicker were subsequently hospitalized in Martin Luther King, Jr. Multi-Service Ambulatory Care Center, where Thomas was pronounced dead. Wicker was in critical condition while arriving to the hospital, but received a surgery for a gunshot to his left arm and was released the same week. Compton was wounded in the arm and treated at St. Francis Medical Center in Lynwood. He was later charged with the murder of Thomas, but was released from jail after pleading no contest to one count of voluntary manslaughter on May 31, 1994. Wicker was sentenced to one year probation under terms of a plea bargain.

== Discography ==
=== Collaboration albums ===
- Real Brothas with B.G. Knocc Out (1995)

=== Singles ===
"Real Muthaphuckkin G's" 1993

"50/50 Luv" 1995

"Jealousy" 1995

"Sippin' on a 40" 1996

"I Represent the CPT" 2015

"No Respect" 2015

=== Guest appearances ===
Title	Release	Other performer(s)	Album
"Real Muthaphuckkin G's"	1993	Eazy-E, B.G. Knocc Out	It's On (Dr. Dre) 187um Killa
"Kuz Itz Like Dat"	1994	Menajahtwa, The Fyrm	Cha-licious
"Da Laz Zhit"	1994	Menajahtwa	Cha-licious
"Ole School Shit"	1995	Eazy-E, B.G. Knocc Out, Sylk-E. Fyne	Str8 off tha Streetz of Muthaphukkin Compton
"Sippin' on a 40"	1995	Eazy-E, B.G. Knocc Out	Str8 off tha Streetz of Muthaphukkin Compton
"Gangsta Beat 4 tha Street"	1995	Eazy-E, B.G. Knocc Out, Menajahtwa	Str8 off tha Streetz of Muthaphukkin Compton
"Knock on Wood (Video Version)"	1995	South Central Cartel, L.V., The Evil Side G's, B.G. Knocc Out, Sh'Killa, Gripsta, Jayo Felony	Murder Squad Nationwide
"Down Fa Mine"	1995	Kam, MC Ren	Made in America
"Streets Won't Let Me Go"	1996	DJ Yella	One Mo Nigga ta Go
"Straight Outta Compton (Remix)"	1998	MC Eiht, King T	Straight Outta Compton: N.W.A 10th Anniversary Tribute
"Black Pussy"	1998	MC Eiht, Crooked I	C-Style Presents Straight Outta Cali
"Victims of Reality"	1998	Big Bub, Nate Dogg	C-Style Presents Straight Outta Cali
"On the Run"	1999	DJ U-Neek	Ghetto Street Pharmacist
"Survival of the Fittest"	1999	WC, Young Shane	Thicker than Water soundtrack
"Give It up for Compton"	2000		Too Gangsta for Radio
"Too Gangsta"	2000	Young Hoggs	Too Gangsta for Radio
"They Like Dat"	2001	Kam, Jayo Felony, Yukmouth, Spider Loc	Kamnesia
"Undadawgs"	2002	C-Bo, CJ Mac	Life as a Rider
"Gangsta Movement"	2006	Lil Eazy-E, B.G. Knocc Out	Cali Untouchable Radio 14: Rebirth of Gangsta Rap
"Blaze It Up"	2007	Tha Dogg Pound, B.G. Knocc Out, Glasses Malone, Jayo Felony	Dogg Chit
"Wake Up"	2009	Daddy V, RBX, Att Will, Tha Chill	OG Daddy V Presents Compton N Longbeach
"West Indeed"	2012	Celly Cel, Young Maylay, Young Dre the Truth, Killa Polk	Celly Cel Presents - Cali Luv
