= Real Brothas =

Studio album by B.G. Knocc Out and Dresta
- Released: August 15, 1995
- Recorded: 1995
- Studio: Kitchen Sync (Hollywood, CA); Skip Saylor Recording (Hollywood, CA); Solid Studios (Studio City, CA)
- Genre: West Coast hip hop; gangsta rap; g-funk
- Length: 1:05:50
- Label: Outburst; Def Jam
- Producer: Anthony "Anti" Lewis (exec.); Greedy Greg (exec.); Charlie B.; Dr. Jam; Madness 4 Real; Rhythm D; Vic C

Singles from Real Brothas
- 1. "50/50 Luv" Released: July 25, 1995; 2. "Jealousy" Released: October 17, 1995

Professional ratings
Review scores
Source	Rating
AllMusic	4.5/5 stars

Real Brothas is the debut studio album by American rappers B.G. Knocc Out and Dresta.

The album was released on August 15, 1995, through Outburst Records and Def Jam Recordings. Recording sessions took place at Kitchen Sync Studio and Skip Saylor Recording in Hollywood, and at Solid Studios in Studio City, California. Production was handled by Rhythm D, Doctor Jam, Madness 4 Real, Charlie B and Vic C, with Anthony "Anti" Lewis and Greedy Greg serving as executive producers. The album debuted at number 128 on the Billboard 200, number 15 on the Top R&B Albums and number five on the Heatseekers Albums in the United States, and sold 250,000 units despite the album having no promotions.

The album featured two singles: "50/50 Luv", dedicated to Eazy-E, and "Jealousy". The promotional single "D.P.G./K" (stands for Dogg Pound Killas) is a diss song towards Death Row Records artists Snoop Doggy Dogg, Dr. Dre, Dat Nigga Daz, Kurupt and Nate Dogg. Music videos were made for "D.P.G./K", "50/50", and "Jealousy". A music video for "Compton Swangin'" was made but never released.

The duo featured on a few more songs across 1995 and 1996 before disbanding after B.G. Knocc Out was incarcerated for attempted murder. Dresta would record with Death Row Records on the compilation album Too Gangsta for Radio, but never released any more solo music despite talks of a solo album titled "A Story To Tell" whilst B.G. Knocc Out released his first solo album in 2011 and continues making music to this day.

In 2015, two songs that were initially recorded for the album, "I Represent the CPT" and "No Respect", were released on November 15th and December 12th respectively as singles. More songs recorded for the album were released on B.G. Knocc Out's 2017 compilation album "Features".

== Track listing ==
No.	Title	Writer(s)	Producer(s)	Length
1.	"Everyday All Day"	Andre DeSean Wicker; Henrik Rasmussen; Lasse Bavngaard; Jesper Dahl; Nicholas Kvaran; Rasmus Berg	Doctor Jam; Madness 4 Real	3:15
2.	"Jealousy"	Wicker; Arlandis Hinton; Rasmussen; Bavngaard; Dahl; Kvaran; Berg	Doctor Jam; Madness 4 Real	4:30
3.	"Whose the "G""	Hinton; Victor Concepcion	Vic C	4:09
4.	"Compton Swangin'"	Hinton; Wicker; Charles Bryant; Robert Bell; Ronald Bell; George M. Brown; Robert Mickens; Claydes Smith; Dennis Thomas; Rick Westfield	Charlie B.	3:47
5.	"Life's a Puzzle"	Wicker; Hinton; Bryant	Charlie B.	4:22
6.	"B.G. Knocc Out"	Wicker; Hinton; Bryant	Charlie B.	5:35
7.	"Compton Hoe"	Wicker; David Weldon; Don Blackman	Rhythm D	4:58
8.	"Micc Checc"	Wicker; Hinton; Rasmussen; Bavngaard; Dahl; Kvaran; Berg	Doctor Jam; Madness 4 Real	4:20
9.	"Compton & Watts"	Wicker; Hinton; Weldon	Rhythm D	4:21
10.	"50/50 Luv"	Wicker; Weldon; Kenneth Gamble; Leon Huff	Rhythm D	4:31
11.	"Real Brothas"	Wicker; Hinton; Weldon; K. McCarl; A. Husband	Rhythm D	4:31
12.	"Do or Die"	Hinton; Bryant	Charlie B.	4:57
13.	"Take a Ride"	Wicker; Weldon; Vaughan Mason; Gregory Bufford; Jerome Bell	Rhythm D	4:24
14.	"Down Goes Another Nigga"	Wicker; Hinton; Weldon	Rhythm D	4:15
15.	"D.P.G./K"	Wicker; Hinton; Rasmussen; Bavngaard; Dahl; Kvaran; Berg; O'Shea Jackson	Doctor Jam; Madness 4 Real	3:55
Total length:				1:05:50

Sample credits

- Track 4 contains an interpolation of "Hollywood Swinging" written by Robert "Kool" Bell, Rick A. Westfield, Dennis R. Thomas, Robert "Spike" Mickens, George M. Brown, Ronald Bell and Claydes Charles Smith.
- Track 10 contains an interpolation of "When Somebody Loves You Back" written by Kenneth Gamble and Leon A. Huff.
- Track 13 contains an interpolation of "Bounce, Rock, Skate, Roll" written by Vaughan Mason, Gregory Bufford and Jerome Bell.
- Track 15 contains a sample of "Better Off Dead" written and performed by Ice Cube, an interpolation of "Real Muthaphuckkin G's", a sample from "Way 2 Fonky" written and recorded by DJ Quik.

== Personnel ==
- Andre "Gangsta Dresta" Wicker – vocals
- Arlandis "B.G. Knocc Out" Hinton – vocals
- La Tee – backing vocals (tracks: 4. 5, 12)
- Larry "LV" Sanders – backing vocals (track 5)
- Mike "Crazy Neck" Sims – guitar & bass (tracks: 1, 2, 8, 15)
- DJ Nut – scratches (track 15)
- Henrik "Dr. Jam" Milling – producer (tracks: 1, 2, 8, 15)
- Lasse Bavngaard – producer (tracks: 1, 2, 8, 15)
- Jesper Dahl – producer (tracks: 1, 2, 8, 15)
- Peter Nicholas Secher Kvaran – producer (tracks: 1, 2, 8, 15)
- Rasmus Ødum Berg – producer (tracks: 1, 2, 8, 15)
- Victor "Vic C" Concepcion – producer (track 3)
- Charlie B. – producer (tracks: 4, 5, 6, 12)
- David "Rhythm D" Weldon – producer (tracks: 7, 9, 10, 11, 13, 14)
- Christian West – recording (tracks: 1, 2, 8, 15)
- Sean Freehill – recording (tracks: 2, 3, 5–7, 9–14)
- Tulio Torrinello – recording (track 4)
- Donovan "The Dirt Biker Sound" Smith – mixing
- Brian Gardner – mastering
- Anthony "Anti" Lewis – executive producer
- Greedy Greg – executive producer
- The Drawing Board – art direction
- Brian Cross – photography

== Charts ==
Chart performance for Real Brothas
Chart (1995)	Peak position
US Billboard 200	128
US Top R&B Albums (Billboard)	15
US Heatseekers Albums (Billboard)	5
