= 50/50 Luv =

Single by B.G. Knocc Out & Dresta

from the album Real Brothas
- B-side: "D.P.G./K.", "Micc Checc"
- Released: July 25, 1995
- Recorded: 1994
- Genre: G-funk, gangsta rap
- Length: 4:31
- Label: Outburst/Def Jam
- Songwriters: K. Gamble/L. Huff/ D. Weldon/A. Wicker
- Producer: Rhythm D

B.G. Knocc Out & Dresta singles chronology
"Real Muthaphuckkin G's" (1993)	"50/50 Luv" (1995)	"Jealousy" (1995)

"50/50 Luv" is the 1995 debut single by rappers B.G. Knocc Out & Dresta. it is also a tributing Track to Eazy-E Who died in March 1995 4 months before the single released. 50/50 Luv was Released on July 25, 1995, By American Rappers B.G. Knocc Out & Dresta. The song peaked at number 68 on the, number 27 on and number five on the. Being their most successful solo single. It is the first single from their debut album Real Brothas.

== Lyrics and music ==
The lyrics deal with the street life, how it has changed people and turned friends against each other. It is also considered a dedication to Eazy-E.

The song contains an interpolation of "When Somebody Loves You Back" by Teddy Pendergrass.

The b-side "D.P.G./K" (stands for Dogg Pound Gangsta Killas) is a diss song towards Death Row Records artists Snoop Doggy Dogg, Dr. Dre, Dat Nigga Daz, Kurupt and Nate Dogg. Both "50/50 Luv" and "D.P.G./K" had music videos.

== Music Video ==
The Music Video, The Music video was directed and written by Guy Guilett. It was shot in Compton. It opens with two scenes, with the first showing a sign that reads "Welcome to Compton" And the 2nd scene Showing a kid riding a bike past five people. It features a reflective tone with Dresta talking about how he misses living in community where everyone was connected.

At the end of the music video, it shows a memory picture reading "In Memory of Eric (Eazy-E) Wright" Giving tribute to Eazy-E who had died just four months earlier Due to AIDs/HIV.

== Track listing ==
No.	Title	Writer(s)	Producer(s)	Length
1.	"50/50 Luv" (LP Version)	Wicker; Weldon; Kenneth Gamble; Leon Huff	Rhythm D	4:31
2.	"50/50 Luv" (Radio Edit)	Wicker; Weldon; Kenneth Gamble; Leon Huff	Rhythm D	3:46
3.	"50/50 Luv" (Instrumental)	Wicker; Weldon; Kenneth Gamble; Leon Huff	Rhythm D	5:00
4.	"D.P.G./K" (LP Version)	Wicker; Hinton; Rasmussen; Bavngaard; Dahl; Kvaran; Berg; O'Shea Jackson	Dr. Jam; Madness 4 Real; DJ Nut	3:54
Total length:				16:31

12" Edition
No.	Title	Writer(s)	Producer(s)	Length
1.	"50/50 Luv" (LP Version)	Wicker; Weldon; Kenneth Gamble; Leon Huff	Rhythm D	4:31
2.	"50/50 Luv" (Radio Edit)	Wicker; Weldon; Kenneth Gamble; Leon Huff	Rhythm D	4:00
3.	"50/50 Luv" (Instrumental)	Wicker; Weldon; Kenneth Gamble; Leon Huff	Rhythm D	5:00
4.	"50/50 Luv" (Acappella)	Wicker; Weldon; Kenneth Gamble; Leon Huff	Rhythm D	5:03
5.	"D.P.G./K" (LP Version)	Wicker; Hinton; Rasmussen; Bavngaard; Dahl; Kvaran; Berg; O'Shea Jackson	Dr. Jam; Madness 4 Real; DJ Nut	3:54
6.	"D.P.G./K" (Radio Version)	Wicker; Hinton; Rasmussen; Bavngaard; Dahl; Kvaran; Berg; O'Shea Jackson	Dr. Jam; Madness 4 Real; DJ Nut	3:54
7.	"D.P.G./K" (Instrumental)	Wicker; Hinton; Rasmussen; Bavngaard; Dahl; Kvaran; Berg; O'Shea Jackson	Dr. Jam; Madness 4 Real; DJ Nut	3:54
8.	"D.P.G./K" (Acappella)	Wicker; Hinton; Rasmussen; Bavngaard; Dahl; Kvaran; Berg; O'Shea Jackson	Dr. Jam; Madness 4 Real; DJ Nut	3:54
Total length:				32:05

== Chart performance ==
The song peaked at number 68 on the Hot R&B/Hip-Hop Singles & Tracks chart, number 27 on the Hot Rap Singles chart and number five on the Bubbling Under R&B/Hip-Hop Singles chart.
