= B.G. Knocc Out =

American rapper (born 1975)

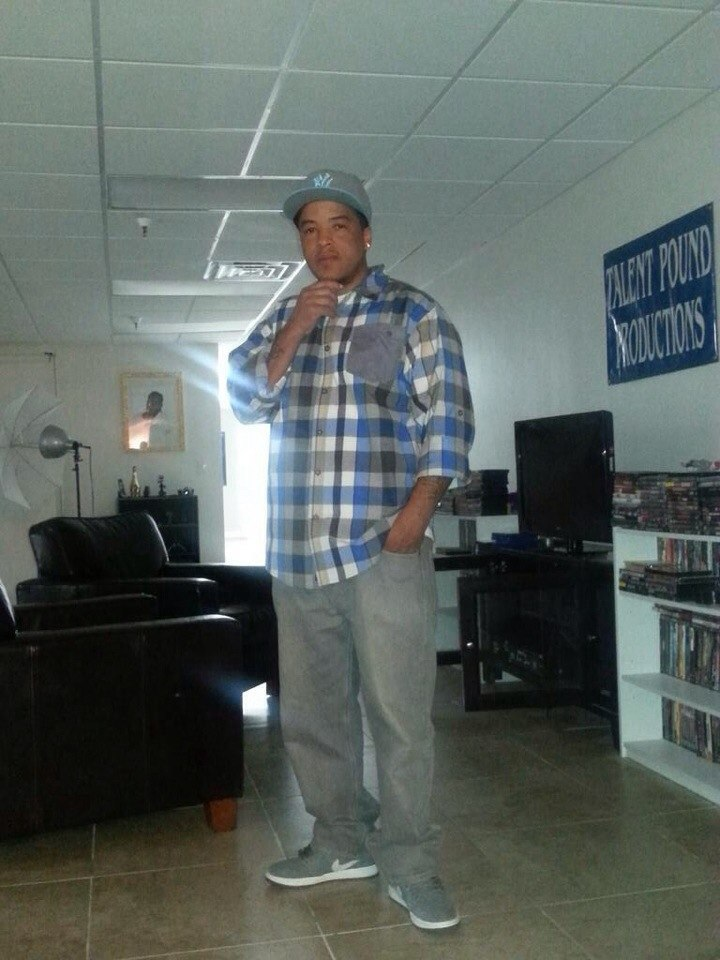

Background information
- Also known as: Al Hasan Naqiyy
- Born: Arlandis Tremel Hinton; January 23, 1975 (age 51); Compton, California, U.S.
- Genres: Hip-hop; gangsta rap
- Occupations: Rapper; songwriter
- Instrument: Vocals
- Years active: 1993–1998; 2006–present
- Labels: Ruthless; Def Jam; Outburst

Al Hasan Naqiyy (born Arlandis Tremel Hinton; born January 23, 1975), known professionally as B.G. Knocc Out, is an American West Coast rapper. Raised in Compton and Watts, California, he became involved in gang life before entering the rap scene alongside his older half-brother, Dresta. In 1993, after being discovered through Dresta by Eazy-E, Naqiyy joined a brewing feud between Eazy-E and Dr. Dre by contributing a verse, improvised on the spot, to the historical diss track "Real Muthaphuckkin Gs," widely regarded as one of the greatest diss tracks of all time. The single became a landmark in hip-hop, peaking at No. 42 on the Billboard Hot 100 and defining the raw, combative style of '90s West Coast diss records.

In 1995, Naqiyy and Dresta released their debut studio album Real Brothas. The album charted at No. 128 on the Billboard 200, No. 15 on the Top R&B Albums, and No. 5 on the Heatseekers chart. During this period, Naqiyy also made featured appearances on several notable hip-hop albums, including Eazy-E's Str8 off tha Streetz of Muthaphukkin Compton (1996), DJ Yella's One Mo Nigga ta Go (1996), and Flesh-n-Bone's T.H.U.G.S. Trues Humbly United Gatherin' Souls (1996).

In 1998, Naqiyy had to serve a ten-year prison sentence. While incarcerated, he converted to Islam and changed his birth name after studying the religion. Following his release in 2008, he returned to music with the albums Eazy-E's Protege (2011), Nutty by Nature (2015), Blocc Boyz (2015), St. L.A. (2015), Uncommon (2017), Da New Crip (2017), and 5st Regime Change (2018).

== Biography ==
=== 1975 to 1993: early life to breakthrough ===
Al Hasan Naqiyy was born in Compton, California on January 23, 1975, as Arlandis Hinton. He was raised by a single mother, Christine Thomas, and has an older half-brother, Andre Wicker (Dresta). Growing up in Compton and Watts, along with its strong influence of gangs, Hinton became involved with the Nutty Blocc Compton Crips along with his brother.

While being up and coming rapper, Naqiyy explained that a label received his demo, and while they liked it they would rather have him be part of the Bloods & Crips group and the 1993 gang-themed project Bangin' on Wax. Naqiyy turned it down thinking it would be "suicide" and explained that he "was 100 percent against that, I was like, 'Nah,' because I knew because of the things they wanted me to do. They wanted me to diss my enemies, to diss the red side and all these different things and I was like, 'Man, that's crazy. Like, what you people trying to do here, like that's crazy.' I wouldn't even be able to live if I came out with some music like that. A lot of them got killed because of that record, on both sides, that record caused a lot of murders. A lot of murders, girls, guys. One of my friends named Big Freeze from the Franklin Squares, from Watts, he's one of the people that actually got killed that was on that record."

During this time, Naqiyy said that he "took a page out of DJ Quik's book because before he came out with his first album, most of those songs were underground and they was all gang music. Like before he changed a lot of the lyrics, he was saying a lot of that stuff in there and then when he finally did come out, he had a lot of resistance from the blue side."

In 1993, Naqiyy began his musical career after meeting rapper and music producer Eric Wright (Eazy-E). At the time Wright was feuding with his former group mate Andre Young (Dr. Dre) and Calvin Broadus (Snoop Dogg), and was planning a response to a diss track they made about him. While Wright was crafting a response, one of his associate heard of two half-brothers, both Nutty Blocc Compton Crips, who rapped. Visiting the brothers' house, Wright's associate found Dresta and took him to the studio, where Wright told him tales of Dre. Dresta, thereby forming the song concept, wrote all the lyrics for an Eazy and Dresta duet. Yet the next day, Dresta brought to Naqiyy the studio, who, improvising it on the spot, added a verse. On their hiring Naqiyy explained "Snoop got with Dre in the early '90s, and he basically stepped into a beef that really didn't have nothin' to do with him. But because Dre picked him up he got on the song "Dre Day" and he dissed Eazy. So around the same time me and my brother, Dre'sta Da Gangsta, we met Eazy, and we stepped into a beef that didn't have nothin' to do with us. And we end up dissin' Snoop and Death Row and Tha Dogg Pound. ... We were just young, knucklehead kids who got into something that we didn't really know nothin' about. But because we was from the streets and we was used to dealing with beef anyway it really didn't matter."

The final product is the single "Real Muthaphuckkin Gs" that remains a defining diss track in hip-hop history, frequently topping lists of the genre's most ruthless and influential battle songs. While early rap disses mainly focused on attacking a rival's skills, "Real Muthaphuckkin Gs" has an unapologetic rawness at the core of his appeal, that ruthlessly expose their rivals past and shatter their image. The single became Wright's highest-charting solo hit, peaking at No. 42 on the Billboard Hot 100. Its impact transcended the era, influencing the no-holds-barred style of future diss tracks.

The single led up Wright's album It's On (Dr. Dre) 187um Killa, released that same year, where Naqiyy would also appear on the track "Down 2 Tha Last Roach". The album went double platinum. In his review published in The News Tribune, Mike Floyd described Naqiyy as a "talented newcomer."

=== 1994 to 1997: subsequent success ===
In August 1995, along with Dresta their first studio album Real Brothas was released through Def Jam records and Outburst records. The album had peaked #128 on the Billboard 200, #15 on the US Top R&B Albums (Billboard), and #5 on the US Heatseekers Albums (Billboard).

During this period Naqiyy made featured appearances on high-profile hip-hop albums these are Menajahtwa's Cha-licious (1994), Murder Squad's Knock On Wood (1995), Eazy-E's Str8 off tha Streetz of Muthaphukkin Compton (1996), DJ Yella's One Mo Nigga ta Go (1996), and Flesh-n-Bone's T.H.U.G.S. Trues Humbly United Gatherin' Souls (1996).

=== 1998 to 2008: hiatus ===
In 1998, Naqiyy was convicted of attempted murder and served ten years in prison. He finished his sentence in 2008.

Within that time frame his most notable appearances were on Flesh-n-Bone's 5th Dog Let Loose (2000), and Tha Dogg Pound Dogg Chit (2007).

=== 2011 to present day: return to music and current works ===
In 2011, Naqiyy released the album Eazy-E's Protege. He explained that he choose the title because he doesn't "appreciate the fact in the industry after Tupac Shakur passed, 'Pac got bigged-up from everybody, even his so-called enemies, and when Notorious B.I.G. passed, Big got bigged-up from everybody, but when E passed who really mentioned E's name among the great people in the Hip Hop world? Not too many people. And, Eazy is the reason – he is the absolute reason why we can get on the record and say the things that we say and express ourselves in the manner that we do. … He's a part of the foundation of being able to get on the record and speak your mind. He fought the F.B.I., nobody else did that. So how you can't give this man his respect like that? And not just the fact that he's my friend, he paved the way for all of us … whether people choose to accept it or not. I just wanna make sure people don't forget this man, because I know some young kids right now that don't even know who he is. And it's sad. It's very sad. And I just wanna rep the man; I just wanna make sure he's not forgotten. And that's the reason why I do what I do."

Moving forward Naqiyy's subsequent album were Nutty by Nature (2015), Blocc Boyz (2015), St. L.A. (2015), Uncommon (2017), Da New Crip (2017), and 5st Regime Change (2018).

On August 10, 2019, he released a single titled "Nobody Move", which featured Ricc Rocc and Michael ACE.

== Personal life ==
While in prison he became a Muslim and changed his birth name, he said he "had never been to prison and I didn't know what to expect. So I just went in with no expectations. After being there for a while and figuring out the system I wanted to become educated, so I began to read a lot. One year in my sentence after talking to Muslims on the yard and studying Islam, I declared the Shahadah."

== Discography ==
=== Studio albums ===
- Eazy-E's Protege (2011)
- Nutty by Nature (2015)
- Blocc Boyz (2015)
- Uncommon (2017)
- Da New Crip (2017)
- 5st Regime Change (2018)

=== Collaboration albums ===
- Real Brothas with Dresta (1995)
- St. L.A. with Nutty Nutt (2015)

=== Compilation albums ===
- Features (2017)

=== Extended plays ===
- 1-Up (2017)

== Guest appearances ==
Title	Release	Other performer(s)	Album
"Real Muthaphuckkin G's"	1993	Eazy-E, Dresta	It's On (Dr. Dre) 187um Killa
"Kickin Azz"	1994	Menajahtwa	Cha-licious
"Ole School Shit"	1995	Eazy-E, Dresta, Sylk-E. Fyne	Str8 off tha Streetz of Muthaphukkin Compton
"Sippin' on a 40"	1995	Eazy-E, Dresta	Str8 off tha Streetz of Muthaphukkin Compton
"Gangsta Beat 4 tha Street"	1995	Eazy-E, Dresta, Menajahtwa	Str8 off tha Streetz of Muthaphukkin Compton
"Knock on Wood (Video Version)"	1995	South Central Cartel, L.V., The Evil Side G's, Dresta, Sh'Killa, Gripsta, Jayo Felony	Murder Squad Nationwide
"Dats How I'm Livin'"	1996	DJ Yella	One Mo Nigga ta Go
"Coming to Serve You"	1996	Flesh-N-Bone	T.H.U.G.S.
"Silent Night"	2001	Flesh-N-Bone, Damon Elliott	5th Dog Let Loose
"Gangsta Movement"	2006	Lil Eazy-E, Dresta	Cali Untouchable Radio 14: Rebirth of Gangsta Rap
"Blaze It Up"	2007	Tha Dogg Pound, Dresta, Glasses Malone, Jayo Felony	Dogg Chit
"Murder One"	2012	C-Bo, MC Eiht	Orca
"Its a Hood Thang"	2013	Emilush & Caustic	non-album single
"Drink Party Dance"	2013	Michael ACE, Adrian Areas, David Vasquez	Entertainment Law, Vol. 1
"OGs aus den 90ern"	2016	Maskoe, Moe Mitchell	OG
"Do for Self Life"	2016	Ricc Rocc	non-album single
"NoBody Move"	2019	Ricc Rocc, Michael ACE	non-album single
