= South Central Madness =

Studio album by South Central Cartel
- Released: January 22, 1992
- Recorded: March–December 1991
- Genres: West Coast hip-hop; gangsta rap
- Length: 52:49
- Label: Pump Records
- Producers: DJ Ace; DJ Gripp; DJ Kaos; Jam-O-Rama; Prodeje; Wes Word

South Central Cartel chronology
South Central Madness (1992)	'N Gatz We Truss (1994)

Singles from South Central Madness
- 1. "U Gotta Deal wit Dis (Gangsta Luv) / Ya Getz Clowned" Released: February 13, 1992; 2. "Pops Was a Rolla" Released: August 26, 1992

Professional ratings
Review scores
Source	Rating
AllMusic	1.5/5 stars
RapReviews	8/10

South Central Madness is the debut studio album by American West Coast gangsta rap group South Central Cartel. It was released on January 22, 1992 through Pump Records with distribution via Quality Records. Production was handled by Prodeje, Jam-O-Rama, DJ Ace, DJ Gripp, DJ Kaos and Wes Word. In the United States, the album peaked at number 51 on the Top R&B/Hip-Hop Albums and number 18 on the Heatseekers Albums charts.

== Track listing ==
No.	Title	Writer(s)	Producer(s)	Length
1.	"Country Bluz"	Cary Calvin; Austin Patterson; Brian West	Prodeje; Jam-O-Rama	4:44
2.	"Say Goodbye to the Badd Guyz"	West; Patterson	Prodeje; DJ Gripp; Jam-O-Rama	3:13
3.	"Ya Want Sum a Dis"	West; Patterson	Wes Word	4:20
4.	"Conspiracy"	Patterson; West; Calvin	Prodeje; Jam-O-Rama	4:28
5.	"Neighborhood Jacka"	West; Patterson	Prodeje; Jam-O-Rama	3:21
6.	"U Gotta Deal Wit Dis (Gangsta Luv)"	West; Patterson	Prodeje; Jam-O-Rama	3:35
7.	"I Get My Roll On"	West	Prodeje; Jam-O-Rama	3:44
8.	"Ya Getz Clowned"	Patterson	Prodeje; Jam-O-Rama	3:17
9.	"Hookaz"	Patterson; West	Prodeje; Jam-O-Rama	4:15
10.	"Pops Was a Rolla"	West; Patterson	Prodeje; DJ Kaos; Jam-O-Rama	3:48
11.	"Think'n Bout My Brotha"	Patterson	Prodeje; Jam-O-Rama	5:16
12.	"South Central Madness"	Patterson; West; Calvin	DJ Ace	5:30
13.	"Livin Like Gangstas"	West; Patterson	Prodeje; DJ Kaos; Jam-O-Rama	3:18
Total length:				52:49

Sample credits

- "County Bluz"
  - "I'm Gonna Love You Just a Little More Baby" by Barry White
- "Hookaz"
  - "Rumors" by Timex Social Club
- "Livin' Like Gangstas"
  - "It's Just Begun" by The Jimmy Castor Bunch
  - "Doo Wa Ditty (Blow That Thing)" by Zapp
- "Neighborhood Jacka"
  - "Funky Drummer" by James Brown
  - "Hot Pants" by James Brown
  - "Get on the Good Foot" by James Brown
- "Pops Was a Rolla"
  - "Papa Was a Rollin' Stone" by The Temptations
  - "Hot Pants (Bonus Beats)" by Bobby Byrd
- "South Central Madness"
  - "Get Off Your Ass and Jam" by Funkadelic
  - "So Ruff, So Tuff" by Roger
- "U Gotta Deal Wit Dis (Gangsta Luv)"
  - "La-La (Means I Love You)" by The Delfonics
  - "Be Alright" by Zapp
- "Ya Getz Clowned"
  - "Rock Steady" by Aretha Franklin
  - "Think (About It)" by Lyn Collins
  - "More Bounce to the Ounce" by Zapp
  - "Big Ole Butt" by LL Cool J
  - "Ain't No Future in Yo' Frontin'" by MC Breed and DFC
- "Conspiracy"
  - "Kool Is Back" by Funk, Inc.
- "I Get My Roll On"
  - "Funky Drummer" by James Brown
  - "Boyz-n-the-Hood" by Eazy-E
  - "Tom's Diner" by DNA

== Personnel ==
- Austin "Prodeje" Patterson — vocals, producer (tracks: 1, 2, 4-11, 13)
- Cary "Havoc Tha Mouthpiece" Calvin — vocals, executive producer
- Brian "Havikk The Rhimeson" West — vocals
- Larry "L.V." Sanders — backing vocals (track 6), vocals (tracks: 10, 11)
- Jasen Hodge — backing vocals (track 6)
- Gregory "DJ Kaos" Scott — scratches (tracks: 2, 5, 6, 8), producer (track 11)
- Richard "DJ Ace" Ascencio — scratches (tracks: 5, 8), producer (track 12)
- Perry "DJ Gripp" Rayson — scratches (track 5), producer (track 2)
- Chris "Jam-O-Rama" Johnson — producer (tracks: 1, 2, 4-11, 13)
- Wesley "Wes Word" Dawson — producer (track 3)
- W. James — executive producer
- R. Richardson — executive producer
- Cliff Badowski — front cover photo
- Duane Abner — back cover photo

== Charts ==
Chart (1992)	Peak position
US Top R&B/Hip-Hop Albums (Billboard)	51
US Heatseekers Albums (Billboard)	18
