= One Mo Nigga ta Go =

Studio album by DJ Yella
- Released: March 26, 1996
- Recorded: 1995–1996
- Studio: Audio Achievements (Torrance, California)
- Genre: Hip hop
- Length: 47:28
- Label: Street Life Records
- Producer: Chuck Gullo (exec.); David Michery (exec.); DJ Yella (also exec.); Donovan Smith (co.); Don Spratley (co.)

DJ Yella chronology
Niggaz4Life (1991)	One Mo Nigga ta Go (1996)

Singles from One Mo Nigga ta Go
- 1. "4 tha E" Released: March 26, 1996; 2. "Dat's How I'm Livin'" Released: May 18, 1996; 3. "Send 4 Me" Released: December 17, 1996

One Mo Nigga ta Go is the only solo studio album by former N.W.A member DJ Yella, released on March 26, 1996. Its release date coincided with the first anniversary of the death of his former N.W.A groupmate Eazy-E, whom the album is dedicated to. The album cover shows close-up of Eazy-E's face and Yella himself at Eazy-E's grave.

== Overview ==
Recording sessions took place at Audio Achievements in Torrance, California with Donovan "The Dirt Biker" Smith, who also provided mixing and co-production. Production was handled primarily by DJ Yella himself. The album features guest appearances from B.G. Knocc Out & Dresta, Kokane, Dirty Red, Traci Nelson and Leicy Loc. It spawned three singles, the main one being "4 tha E", a tribute song to Eazy-E featuring Kokane, which peaked at #50 on the US Billboard Hot Rap Songs and had a music video. The other two singles were "Dat's How I'm Livin'" featuring B.G. Knocc Out and "Send 4 Me" featuring Traci Nelson.

Yella never released any other solo material, and after the release he left the music industry to direct pornographic films until 2011, when he started working on a new album called West Coastin which currently has no information regarding the project since 2012. One of the reasons Yella made this album was to help raise money for college for nine of Eazy-E's children.

The album peaked at number 82 on the Billboard 200 albums chart and at number 23 on the Top R&B/Hip-Hop Albums chart in the United States.

== Critical reception ==
Professional ratings
Review scores
Source	Rating
AllMusic	3/5 stars
Vibe	(favorable)

The album was mildly received. AllMusic gave the album 3 stars while Bradley Torreano called it "a flop". The Milwaukee Journal Sentinel's Cary Darling called it along with MC Ren's The Villain in Black (which was released two weeks later after the album's release) "ordinary by hard-core rap standards".

== Track listing ==
No.	Title	Writer(s)	Length
1.	"Dose of Reality"	A. Carraby	0:33
2.	"Westside Story" (featuring Dirty Red)	A. Carraby; K. Carter; M. Sims	3:43
3.	"Interlude"		0:20
4.	"Streets Won't Let Me Go" (featuring Dresta)	A. Carraby; A. Wicker	4:01
5.	"Interlude"		0:10
6.	"Neva Had a Chance"	A. Carraby	4:40
7.	"Interlude"		0:14
8.	"4 tha E" (featuring Kokane)	A. Carraby; J. Long, Jr.; M. Sims	4:48
9.	"Interlude"		0:12
10.	"Send 4 Me" (featuring Traci Nelson)	S. Dees; T. Kersey	6:15
11.	"Interlude"		0:16
12.	"Dat's How I'm Livin'" (featuring B.G. Knocc Out)	A. Carraby; A. Hinton	5:00
13.	"Interlude"		0:09
14.	"Ain't No Luv" (featuring Dirty Red)	A. Carraby; K. Carter; M. Sims	4:20
15.	"Interlude"		0:17
16.	"2Two Face" (featuring Leicy Loc)	A. Carraby	3:37
17.	"Interlude"		0:14
18.	"So In Luv"	A. Carraby	4:57
19.	"Interlude"		0:30
20.	"Not Long Ago"	A. Carraby; M. Sims	3:12
Total length:			47:28

Sample credits

- Track 4 contains elements from "Riding High" by Faze-O
- Track 6 contains elements from "Gotta Find a Lover" by Roy Ayers Ubiquity
- Track 8 contains elements from "Eazy-Duz-It" by Eazy-E
- Track 10 is a cover of "Send for Me" by Atlantic Starr
- Track 12 contains elements from "A Love of Your Own" by Average White Band and "Real Muthaphuckkin G's" by Eazy-E
- Track 18 contains elements from "Moments in Love" by Art of Noise

== Personnel ==
- Antoine Carraby – vocals, producer, executive producer
- Kevyn "Shaki" Carter – vocals (tracks: 2, 14)
- Andre DeSean Wicker – vocals (track 4)
- Jerry Buddy Long Jr. – vocals (track 8)
- Traci Nelson – vocals (track 10)
- Arlandis Hinton – vocals (track 12)
- Leicy Loc – vocals (track 16)
- Mike "Crazy Neck" Sims – keyboards, guitar, bass
- Stan Martin – trumpet, flugelhorn
- Donovan "Tha Dirt Biker" Sound – co-producer, mixing, recording
- Don "D-Dawg" Spratley – co-producer (track 18)
- Brian "Big Bass" Gardner – mastering
- David Michery – A&R, executive producer
- Chuck Gullo – executive producer
- Doug Haverty – art direction
- Johnny Buzzerio – photography

== Chart history ==
Chart (1996)	Peak position
US Billboard 200	82
US Top R&B/Hip-Hop Albums (Billboard)	23
