= God Forgive Me =

God Forgive Me may refer to:

- Que Dios me perdone, a 1948 Mexican film directed by Tito Davison and released in English as May God Forgive Me
- "God Forgive Me", a song by Madcon
- "God Forgive Me", a song by DJ Kay Slay on the album More Than Just a DJ
- "God Forgive Me", a song by Ice-T on the album The Seventh Deadly Sin
