= 'N Gatz We Truss =

1994 studio album by South Central Cartel

Studio album by South Central Cartel
- Released: May 10, 1994
- Recorded: 1993–1994
- Studio: Kitchen Sync Studio (Hollywood, CA)
- Genre: West Coast hip hop; gangsta rap; G-funk
- Length: 1:09:26
- Label: G.W.K. Records; Rush Associated Labels
- Producer: Havoc Tha Mouthpiece (exec.); Prodeje; Havikk The Rhime Son; DJ Gripp (co.); L.V. (co.); DJ Kaos (co.)

South Central Cartel chronology
South Central Madness (1992)	'N Gatz We Truss (1994)	Murder Squad Nationwide (1995)

Singles from 'N Gatz We Truss
- 1. "Servin' 'Em Heat" Released: 1993; 2. "Seventeen Switches" Released: 1994; 3. "Gang Stories" Released: 1994

Professional ratings
Review scores
Source	Rating
AllMusic	2.5/5 stars
Entertainment Weekly	B−

'N Gatz We Truss is the second studio album by American rap group South Central Cartel. It was released on May 10, 1994, via South G.W.K. Records and Rush Associated Labels. Recording sessions took place at Kitchen Sync Studio in Hollywood, California with producers Prodeje and Havikk the Rhime Son, co-producers DJ Gripp, L.V. and DJ Kaos, and executive producer Cary "Havoc" Calvin. The album features guest performances by 2Pac, Mr. 3-2, Big Mike, Ice-T, MC Eiht and Spice 1, and also introduced a new member to the group, Patrick "Young Prodeje" Pitts.

The album reached number 32 on the Billboard 200 and number 4 on the Top R&B Albums chart in the United States. It spawned two promotional singles: "Servin' 'Em Heat" and "Seventeen Switches", and a single "Gang Stories", which peaked at No. 63 on the Hot R&B Singles chart and No. 12 on the Hot Rap Singles chart. Along with the singles, music videos were produced for all the three songs and for "It's a S.C.C. Thang".

== Track listing ==
No.	Title	Writer(s)	Producer(s)	Length
1.	"Bring It On"	A. Patterson; B. West; R. Ball; S. Ferrone; A. Gorrie; O. McIntyre; J. Stuart; M. Duncan	Prodeje	4:41
2.	"Drive Bye Homicide"	A. Patterson; B. West; C. Calvin; P. Rayson	Prodeje; DJ Gripp (co.)	3:49
3.	"Servin' 'Em Heat"	A. Patterson; B. West; C. Calvin; R. Troutman	Prodeje	4:19
4.	"Gang Stories" (featuring Big Mike & Tre-Duce)	A. Patterson; B. West; C. Calvin; P. Pitts; M. Barnett	Prodeje	4:48
5.	"Seventeen Switches"	A. Patterson; B. West; C. Calvin; P. Pitts	Prodeje	4:33
6.	"U Couldn't Deal Wit Dis"	A. Patterson; B. West; L. Sanders	Prodeje	3:58
7.	"Do It SC Style"	A. Patterson; B. West; C. Calvin	Havikk The Rhime Son	3:58
8.	"Dick Suckin' Contest"	C. Calvin	Prodeje	1:22
9.	"Had to Be Loc'd"	A. Patterson; B. West; L. Blackmon; R. Troutman; C. Singleton; N. Leftenant; T. Jenkins	Havikk The Rhime Son	3:19
10.	"Lil Knucklehead"	A. Patterson; T. Allen; M. Dickerson; C. Miller; H. Brown; H. Scott; L. Oskar; L. Jordan	Prodeje	3:21
11.	"It's a S.C.C. Thing"	A. Patterson; B. West; L. Sanders; P. Rayson	Havikk The Rhime Son; DJ Gripp (co.); L.V. (co.)	3:17
12.	"Stay Out da Hood"	A. Patterson; B. West; P. Rayson; A. Noland; G. Webster; W. Morrison; L. Bonner; M. Jones; M. Pierce; B. Napier; R. Middlebrooks	Prodeje; DJ Gripp (co.)	4:34
13.	"Rollin' Down da Block"	A. Patterson; B. West; C. Calvin; P. Pitts	Prodeje	4:16
14.	"Get 'Em"	A. Patterson; B. West; P. Pitts	Havikk The Rhime Son	3:47
15.	"Gangsta Team" (featuring MC Eiht, Ice-T, Spice 1 & 2Pac)	A. Patterson; B. West; C. Calvin; A. Tyler; T. Marrow; R. Green; T. Shakur	Prodeje	5:56
16.	"Shot Outz"	A. Patterson; C. Calvin	Prodeje	1:19
17.	"Marinate"	A. Patterson; B. West; L. Sanders; G. Scott	Prodeje; DJ Kaos (co.)	4:09
18.	"Hoo Riding' in da Central"	A. Patterson; B. West	Prodeje	4:00
Total length:				1:09:26

== Sample credits ==
- "Bring It On"
  - "School Boy Crush" by Average White Band
- "Drive Bye Homicide"
  - "Endangered Species (Tales From the Darkside)" by Ice Cube
- "Gang Stories"
  - "Tutu" by Miles Davis
  - "Hood Took Me Under" by Compton's Most Wanted
- "Had to Be Loc'd"
  - "Ya Getz Clowned" by South Central Cartel
- "Hoo Riding in Da Central"
  - "Flash Light" by Parliament
  - "Get Up to Get Down" by Brass Construction
  - "South Central Madness" by South Central Cartel
- "Lil Knucklehead"
  - "Slippin' into Darkness" by War
- "Servin' 'Em Heat"
  - "More Bounce to the Ounce" by Zapp
  - "Ya Getz Clowned" by South Central Cartel
- "Shot Outz"
  - "World Is a Madhouse" by Silver Convention
- "Stay Out Da Hood"
  - "Get Out of My Life, Woman" by Lee Dorsey
  - "Pride and Vanity" by Ohio Players
- "U Couldn't Deal Wit Dis"
  - "Love T.K.O." by Teddy Pendergrass

== Personnel ==
- Austin Patterson – main artist, producer
- Brian K. West – main artist, producer
- Cary Calvin – main artist, executive producer
- Patrick Earl Pitts – main artist
- Larry Sanders – main artist, co-producer
- Perry Rayson – main artist, scratches, co-producer
- Gregory Scott – main artist, scratches, co-producer
- Michael Barnett – featured artist (track 4)
- Christopher Juel Barriere – featured artist (track 4)
- Aaron Tyler – featured artist (track 15)
- Tracy Lauren Marrow – featured artist (track 15)
- Robert Lee Green, Jr. – featured artist (track 15)
- Tupac Amaru Shakur – featured artist (track 15)
- Richard Ascencio – scratches
- Robert "Fonksta" Bacon – bass, guitar
- Keith Ciancia – keyboards, moog synthesizer
- Charles Green – flute, saxophone
- Gregory H. Royal – engineering, mixing
- Christian Robert Johnson – engineering, recording
- Sean Freehill – engineering, recording
- Bernard Grundman – mastering
- Glen E. Friedman – design, photography

== Charts ==
=== Weekly charts ===
Chart (1994)	Peak position
US Billboard 200	32
US Top R&B/Hip-Hop Albums (Billboard)	4

=== Year-end charts ===
Chart (1994)	Position
US Top R&B/Hip-Hop Albums (Billboard)	62
