= Murder Squad Nationwide =

Studio album by South Central Cartel
- Released: February 14, 1995
- Recorded: 1994
- Genre: West Coast hip hop; gangsta rap; G-funk
- Length: 55:56
- Label: G.W.K. Records; DJ West
- Producer: Havoc Tha Mouthpiece (exec.); Prodeje; Ant Banks; DJ Gripp; G$ Money; Riddler; Tootie

South Central Cartel chronology
'N Gatz We Truss (1994)	Murder Squad Nationwide (1995)	All Day Everyday (1997)

Professional ratings
Review scores
Source	Rating
Allmusic	2/5 stars

Murder Squad Nationwide is an album by American rap group South Central Cartel and friends. It was released February 14, 1995, on South Central Cartel's G.W.K. Records and distributed by Def Jam Recordings. The album features production by Ant Banks, DJ Gripp, G$ Money and Prodeje. It peaked at number 12 on the Billboard Top R&B/Hip-Hop Albums, at number 1 on the Billboard Top Heatseekers and at number 106 on the Billboard 200. The album features performances by Spice 1, Ant Banks, Ice-T, Treach, 187 Fac, Mr. Wesside, Hot Dolla and Big Mike.

== Knock on Wood ==
There are two different versions of the song, "Knock on Wood", the album version and the video version. The album version features performances by Sh'Killa, Gripsta and South Central Cartel.

An alternate clean version of the song was released as a single and music video to promote the album. Both versions of the song were produced by Prodeje and feature the same verses by Sh'Killa and Gripsta and the same chorus sung by L.V. The video version of "Knock on Wood" replaces the South Central Cartel members verses with verses by The Evil Side G's, B.G. Knocc Out & Dresta and Jayo Felony. The remixed version of the song does not appear on the album.

== Track listing ==
No.	Title	Writer(s)	Producer(s)	Length
1.	"It's an S.C.C. Thang" (featuring The Chi-Lites)	A. Watson; A. Patterson; B. West; C. Calvin; L. Sanders; M. Thompson; P. Pitts; R. Lester; S. Otis	Prodeje	4:08
2.	"G Slide"	A. Patterson; P. Pitts	Prodeje	3:34
3.	"No Peace" (featuring Ice-T, Powerlord Jel, Spice 1, Ant Banks, Boss, Treach, Dori)	A. Banks; A. Criss; A. Patterson; B. West; C. Calvin; L. Laws; M. Bates; P. Pitts; R. Green; T. Marrow	Prodeje	4:51
4.	"Ghetto Got Me Shadey"	A. Patterson; B. West; M. White; P. Bailey	Prodeje	4:22
5.	"Gun Smoke" (featuring 187 Fac, Spice 1, Big Mike)	A. Patterson; C. Calvin; G. Reed; M. Barnett; R. Green	G$ Money	3:59
6.	"Pass da Dank" (featuring Ant Banks, Spice 1, Dee, Mel-Low, Tre-Duce, Mr. Wesside)	A. Banks; C. Calvin; C. Barriere; I. Moore; M. Moore; R. Green; W. Dawson	Ant Banks	6:40
7.	"Knock on Wood" (featuring Sh'Killa, Gripsta)	A. Patterson; B. Younger; B. West; L. Sanders; P. Pitts; T. Prince	Prodeje	5:12
8.	"On Dat Ass" (featuring Young Money, Godfather)	C. Calvin; P. Pitts; P. Rayson; T. Lampkins; T. Terrell	DJ Gripp	4:21
9.	"187 Squad" (featuring Hot Dolla, Laywiy)	B. West; C. Calvin; D. Brown; J. Lars, Jr.; L. Brailsford; P. Pitts	Tootie	5:24
10.	"Who's da Star"	A. Patterson; B. West; C. Calvin; P. Pitts	Prodeje	4:19
11.	"Why Must G's" (featuring Sh'Killa, LP, Mr. Wesside)	A. Patterson; C. Calvin; P. Pitts; T. Prince; W. Winston; W. Dawson	Prodeje	5:04
12.	"Straight Honey Made" (featuring Portia)	P. Martin; R. Harris; R. LaCrosby	Riddler	4:02
Total length:				55:56

== Chart history ==
Chart (1995)	Peak position
US Billboard 200	106
US Top R&B/Hip-Hop Albums (Billboard)	12
US Heatseekers Albums (Billboard)	1
