= 187 Fac =

American rap group

- Also known as: DenGee
- Origin: Hayward, California, California, U.S.
- Genres: West Coast hip hop, Rap
- Years active: 1992-2000
- Labels: Penalty, Ronlan
- Members: Den Fenn; G-Nut (deceased)

187 Fac was an American rap group from Hayward, California, with two members: Den Fenn (Alvin Dennis Thomas, Jr.) and G-Nut (Gregory Savoy Brown, Jr). After releasing their debut album, The U.N.E., in 1993, they made their first guest appearance on Ant Banks' 1995 album, Do or Die. Before releasing their second album, Fac Not Fiction on Penalty Recordings in 1997, they appeared together on several albums, including: Murder Squad Nationwide, The Rompalation, and Have Heart Have Money. In 1996, they appeared on the Red Hot Organization's compilation CD, America is Dying Slowly, alongside Biz Markie, Wu-Tang Clan, and Fat Joe, among many other prominent hip hop artists. The CD, meant to raise awareness of the AIDS epidemic among African American men, was heralded as "a masterpiece" by The Source magazine.

== Background ==
187 Fac's second album, Fac Not Fiction, was released in 1997 and peaked at number 81 on the Billboard Top R&B/Hip-Hop Albums. It was executive produced by Spice 1 and features guest performances by Ant Banks, B-Legit, V-Dal, Big Lurch, Captain Save 'Em and Spice 1. The group then went on to appear on several Bay Area artists' albums and compilations as a group and as solo artists.

In 2000, the group changed their name to DenGee and released their final album, DenGee Livin'. It was produced entirely by E-A-Ski & CMT. Along with a single, a music video was released to promote the album, "VIP Status", and features a cameo appearance by producer E-A-Ski.

G-Nut died on 9 May 2018 at the age of 46.

== Discography ==
=== Studio albums ===
- The U.N.E. (1993)
- Fac Not Fiction (1997)
- DenGee Livin' (2000)

=== Guest appearances ===
Title	Release	Other artist(s)	Album
"Sound of Lead"	1995	Ant Banks, Spice 1	Do or Die
"Gun Smoke"	1995	South Central Cartel, Spice 1, Big Mike	Murder Squad Nationwide
"Check Ya Self"	1996	Spice 1, Celly Cel, Ant Banks, Gangsta P	America Is Dying Slowly
"Get High"	1996	Potna Deuce	Heron Soup
"Spread Yo' Hustle"	1996	Spice 1, Da' Unda' Dogg, Mac Dre	4080 Magazine Compilation Volume 1: Mobbin' Thru the Bay!
"Murder Stance"	1997	Neighborhood Kingpins	Kingpin Status
"Sick Wid It Shit"	1997	The Mossie	Have Heart Have Money
"Dyrty Money"	1997	Mac Dre, Da' Unda' Dogg	The Rompalation
"Fac Life"	1998	Spice 1	4080 Magazine Compilation Volume 2: Bay Luv
"Fully Automatic Club"	1998	Guce	If It Ain't Real, It Ain't Official
"Maintain"	1998	Black Rhino	Paper Route
"Fuck the World"	1999	Spice 1, Young Kyoz	Immortalized
