= All Day Everyday =

Studio album by South Central Cartel
- Released: June 3, 1997
- Recorded: Autumn 1996–Spring 1997
- Studio: Kitchen Sync Studio (Hollywood, CA); Echo Sound (Los Angeles, CA)
- Genre: West Coast hip hop; gangsta rap; g-funk
- Length: 1:11:28
- Label: Rush Associated Labels
- Producer: Havoc Tha Mouthpiece (exec.); Prodeje; Havikk The Rhime Son; Sean T; The Real Richie Rich; Robert "Fonksta" Bacon (add.); Tomie Mundy (add.)

South Central Cartel chronology
Murder Squad Nationwide (1995)	All Day Everyday (1997)	Concrete Jungle Vol. 1 (1999)

Singles from All Day Everyday
- 1. "All Day Everyday" Released: 1997; 2. "S.C.G.'z" Released: 1997

Professional ratings
Review scores
Source	Rating
AllMusic	4/5 stars

All Day Everyday is the fourth studio album by American West Coast hip hop group South Central Cartel. It was released on June 3, 1997 via Rush Associated Labels. Recording sessions took place at Echo Sound and Kitchen Sync Studio in Los Angeles between Autumn 1996 and Spring 1997. Production was handled by members Prodeje and Havikk The Rhime Son, Sean T and The Real Richie Rich, with additional producers Tomie Mundy and Robert "Fonksta" Bacon. The album peaked at number 178 on the Billboard 200 and number 35 on the Top R&B/Hip-Hop Albums in the United States.

== Track listing ==
No.	Title	Writer(s)	Producer(s)	Length
1.	"West Coast Gangstas"	Austin Patterson; Brian West; Patrick Pitts; Jonathan West; LaDracious Espree	Prodeje	4:30
2.	"I'm a Rider"	Patterson; B. West; Pitts	Prodeje; Tomie Mundy (add.); Robert "Fonksta" Bacon (add.)	3:37
3.	"Niggas Git Delt Wit"	Patterson; B. West; Pitts	Havikk The Rhime Son; Robert "Fonksta" Bacon (add.); Tomie Mundy (add.)	4:11
4.	"It Don't Stop"	B. West; Patterson; Marvin Gaye; Ed Townsend	Prodeje; Havikk The Rhime Son	4:23
5.	"All Day Every Day"	B. West; Pitts	Prodeje; Tomie Mundy (add.); Robert "Fonksta" Bacon (add.)	4:01
6.	"Hit the Chaw"	B. West; Patterson; Espree; J. West; Larry Sanders; Billie Calvin	Havikk The Rhime Son	3:50
7.	"G's Game"	B. West; Patterson; Lionel Richie	Prodeje	4:32
8.	"4 Yo Ear"	Patterson; B. West; Cary Calvin; James Alexander; Larry Dodson; Winston Stewart; Charles Allen; Sherman Guy; Mark Bynum; Lloyd Smith; Allen Alvoid Jones, Jr.	The Real Richie Rich	4:08
9.	"W.C. Rocks"	Patterson; B. West; Pitts; Espree; J. West; Steven Stanley; Tina Weymouth; Chris Frantz; Adrian Belew	Prodeje; Tomie Mundy (add.)	5:01
10.	"Can I Roll Wit U"	Pitts; Ernie Isley; Marvin Isley; O'Kelly Isley Jr.; Ronald Isley; Rudolph Isley; Chris Jasper	Sean T	4:10
11.	"Da Bomb"	B. West; Patterson; E. Isley; M. Isley; Jasper; Gregory Abbott	Prodeje	4:35
12.	"Champagne Wishes"	B. West; Pitts; Luther Vandross	Havikk The Rhime Son	4:05
13.	"Funk U Up"	Patterson; B. West; Sylvia Robinson; Angela Brown; Cheryl Cook; Gwendolyn Chisolm	Prodeje	4:05
14.	"No Get Bacc"	Patterson; B. West; Pitts	Prodeje; Robert "Fonksta" Bacon (add.); Tomie Mundy (add.)	4:15
15.	"Gangsta Luv, Pt. 2"	B. West; Patterson; C. Calvin	Prodeje	4:11
16.	"S.C.G.'z"	Patterson; B. West	Havikk The Rhime Son; Robert "Fonksta" Bacon (add.); Tomie Mundy (add.)	4:00
17.	"Family Thang"	Patterson; B. West; Pitts; J. West; Espree	Havikk The Rhime Son; Tomie Mundy (add.); Robert "Fonksta" Bacon (add.)	3:54
Total length:				1:11:28

Sample credits

- Track 4 contains an interpolation of "Let's Get It On" written by Marvin Gaye and Ed Townsend.
- Track 6 contains an interpolation of "Wishing on a Star" written by Billie Rae Calvin.
- Track 7 contains an interpolation of "This Is Your Life" written by Lionel Richie.
- Track 8 contains a sample of "Hit & Run" written by James Alexander, Larry Dodson, Winston Stewart, Charles Allen, Sherman Guy, Mark Bynum, Lloyd Smith and Allen A. Jones and performed by the Bar-Kays.
- Track 9 contains an interpolation of "Genius of Love" written by Steven Stanley, Tina Weymouth, Chris Frantz and Adrian Belew.
- Track 10 contains an interpolation of "Let Me Down Easy" written by Ernie Isley, Marvin Isley, O'Kelly Isley Jr., Ronald Isley, Rudolph Isley and Chris Jasper.
- Track 11 contains an interpolation of "Caravan of Love" written by Isley-Jasper-Isley and an interpolation of "Shake You Down" written by Gregory Abbott.
- Track 12 contains an interpolation of "Never Too Much" written by Luther Vandross.
- Track 13 contains an interpolation of "Funk You Up" written by Sylvia Robinson, Angela Brown, Cheryl Cook and Gwendolyn Chisolm.

== Personnel ==
- Austin "Prodeje" Patterson – vocals, producer
- Brian "Havikk The Rhime Son" West – vocals, producer
- Patrick "Young Prod" Pitts – vocals
- Cary "Havoc The Mouthpiece" Calvin – vocals, executive producer
- Larry "L.V." Sanders – additional vocals
- Jonathan "Drewp" West – additional vocals
- LaDracious "2N" Espree – additional vocals
- Aurelia Woodgett – additional vocals
- Playa Hata Mike – additional vocals
- Portia Martin – additional vocals
- Ebone – additional vocals
- Robert "Fonksta" Bacon – guitar, bass, additional producer
- Tomie Mundy – keyboards, additional producer
- Ray "Drummer Boy" West – drums
- Richard "The Real Richie Rich" Anthony – producer (track 8)
- Sean Miguel "Sean T" Thompson – producer (track 10)
- Bob Morse – recording, mixing
- Sean Freehill – recording, mixing
- Mike Hill – recording
- Brian "Big Bass" Gardner – mastering
- Brian "B+" Cross – photography
- The Drawing Board – design
- Tina M. Davis – A&R

== Chart history ==
Chart (1997)	Peak position
US Billboard 200	178
US Top R&B/Hip-Hop Albums (Billboard)	35
