= Throw Your Hands Up =

Throw Your Hands Up may refer to:

- ""Throw Your Hands Up" (L.V. song)
- "Throw Your Hands Up (Dançar Kuduro)", song by Qwote featuring Pitbull and Lucenzo
- "Vifta med händerna", song by Basshunter and Patrik & Lillen released as "Throw Your Hands Up"
- "Throw Your Hands Up", song by 8Ball & MJG from the album In Our Lifetime
- "Throw Your Hands Up", song by Aaliyah from the album Age Ain't Nothing but a Number
- "Throw Your Hands Up", song by Tupac Shakur from the album Pump Ya Fist: Hip Hop Inspired by the Black Panthers
