= I Am L.V. =

Studio album by L.V.
- Released: May 7, 1996
- Recorded: 1995
- Genre: West Coast hip hop; G-funk; R&B
- Length: 67:00
- Label: Tommy Boy
- Producer: Prodeje; Maurice "DJ Moe" Thompson; Jay "Supreme" Williams; Doug Rasheed; Travon Potts; Montell Jordan; Shapelle Crawford

L.V. chronology
I Am L.V. (1996)	How Long (2000)

Singles from I Am L.V.
- 1. "Gangsta's Paradise" Released: August 1, 1995; 2. "Throw Your Hands Up" Released: October 17, 1995; 3. "I Am L.V." Released: March 26, 1996

Professional ratings
Review scores
Source	Rating
Entertainment Weekly	B−
Muzik	2/5 stars

I Am L.V. is the debut solo studio album by American singer L.V. It was released on May 7, 1996, through Tommy Boy Records. The album produced three charted singles: "Throw Your Hands Up", "I Am L.V.", and a reworking of his chart-topping collaboration with Coolio, "Gangsta's Paradise".

== Track listing ==
I Am L.V. track listing
No.	Title	Writer(s)	Producer(s)	Length
1.	"Throw Your Hands Up" (Treach Version)	A. Edwards; A. Criss; J. Williams; K. Blue; L. Sanders; M. Thompson	Barr 9 Productions	3:51
2.	"The 'G' Within"	A. Edwards; J. Williams; L. Sanders; M. Thompson	Barr 9 Productions	4:07
3.	"The Wrong Come Up" (featuring Evil Side G's)	B. Withers; C. Meeks; L. Sanders; P. Pitts; S. McKinney	Prodeje; Robert Bacon (co.); Tomie Mundy (co.)	3:59
4.	"Take a Ride"	J. Williams; K. Blue; L. Sanders; M. Thompson; R. Hall; R. Irving III	Barr 9 Productions	4:14
5.	"Gangsta's Boogie" (Barr 9 Version)	B. Bacharach; H. David; L. Sanders	Barr 9 Productions	4:42
6.	"Crazy Little G's (Part 1)"	A. Patterson; L. Sanders	Prodeje; L.V. (co.); Robert Bacon (co.); Tomie Mundy (co.)	2:07
7.	"Crazy Little G's (Part 2)"	A. Ivey, Jr.; A. Patterson; L. Sanders	Prodeje; L.V. (co.); Robert Bacon (co.); Tomie Mundy (co.)	4:41
8.	"Gangsta's Paradise" (L.V. Version)	D. Rasheed; L. Sanders; S. Wonder	Doug Rasheed	4:01
9.	"Fire From the Gun"	A. Patterson; L. Sanders	Prodeje; L.V. (co.); Robert Bacon (co.); Tomie Mundy (co.)	3:48
10.	"Cool Out"	D. Rasheed; L. Sanders	Doug Rasheed	4:07
11.	"I Am L.V."	L. Sanders; M. Barnett	Shapelle Crawford; Montell Jordan	4:30
12.	"Hey Love"	A. Edwards; L. Sanders; T. Potts	Travon Potts	3:01
13.	"It's Wet"	A. Patterson; L. Sanders	Prodeje	3:40
14.	"Heaven Must Be Like This"	C. Satchell; L. Bonner; E. Jones; M. Pierce; R. Middlebrooks; W. Rodger	Barr 9 Productions	4:05
15.	"Just a Little Something"	A. Edwards; L. Sanders; T. Potts	Travon Potts	7:10
16.	"Gangsta's Boogie" (Prodeje Version)	B. Bacharach; H. David; L. Sanders	Prodeje	4:26

Notes

- Track 14 is a cover of "Heaven Must Be Like This" by Ohio Players (1974)

Sample credits

- Track 1 contains elements from "Bounce, Rock, Skate, Roll" by Vaughan Mason & Crew (1979) and "(Not Just) Knee Deep" by Funkadelic (1979)
- Track 2 contains elements from "Mr. Groove" by One Way (1984)
- Track 3 contains elements from "Who Is He (And What Is He to You)?" by Bill Withers (1972)
- Track 5 contains elements from "The Look of Love" by Isaac Hayes (1970)
- Track 8 contains elements from "Pastime Paradise" by Stevie Wonder (1976)
- Track 16 contains elements from "Outstanding" by The Gap Band (1982)

== Personnel ==
- Larry Sanders – vocals, executive producer, co-producer (tracks: 6–7, 9)
- Austin Patterson – producer (tracks: 3, 6–7, 9, 13, 16)
- Jasiri Armon Williams – producer (tracks: 1–2, 4–5, 14)
- Maurice Thompson – producer (tracks: 1–2, 4–5, 14)
- Doug Rasheed – producer (tracks: 8, 10)
- Travon Potts – producer (tracks: 12, 15)
- Anthony Crawford – producer (track 11)
- Montell Du'Sean Barnett – producer (track 11)
- Robert "Fonksta" Bacon – co-producer (tracks: 3, 6–7, 9)
- Tomie Mundy – co-producer (tracks: 3, 6–7, 9)
- Thomas Coyne – mastering
- Paul Stewart – executive producer
- Albee – executive producer

== Charts ==
Chart performance from I Am L.V. track listing
Chart (1996)	Peak position
Australian Albums (ARIA)	96
German Albums (Offizielle Top 100)	72
US Top R&B/Hip-Hop Albums (Billboard)	100
