= Cha-licious =

Studio album by Menajahtwa
- Released: August 23, 1994
- Recorded: 1993–1994
- Studios: Audio Achievements (Torrance, CA); Black Hole (Hawthorne, CA)
- Genre: Hip-hop
- Labels: Ruthless; Relativity
- Producers: Eazy-E (exec.); DJ Yella (also exec.); DJ U-Neek; Rhythum D; Don Spratley (co.)

Menajahtwa chronology
Cha-licious (1994)	Who'z Party? (1998)

Singles from Cha-licious
- 1. "La La La" Released: 1994

Professional ratings
Review scores
Source	Rating
RapReviews	7/10

Cha-licious is the debut studio album by female rap duo Menajahtwa. It was released on August 23, 1994 via Ruthless Records and Relativity Records. Recording sessions took place at Audio Achievements in Torrance, California, except for one song, "Kuz Itz Like Dat", which was recorded at the Black Hole in Hawthorne, California. Production was handled by DJ Yella, Rhythum D and Eazy-E. It features guest appearances from B.G. Knocc Out & Dresta, Eazy-E, Traci Nelson and Leicy Loc. Neither the album, nor its lead single, "La La La", reached any Billboard chart.

== Track listing ==
No.	Title	Writer(s)	Producer(s)	Length
1.	"Breaka" (Featuring Gangsta Dresta)	T. Hudson; M. Fields; A. Carraby	DJ Yella	3:29
2.	"Cha-Licious"	T. Hudson; M. Fields; A. Carraby; R. Evans; R. Powell; P. Upchurch	DJ Yella	3:57
3.	"Neva Krepp" (Featuring Gangsta Dresta)	T. Hudson; M. Fields; A. Carraby; A. Wicker; L. Smith; J. Gaines	DJ Yella; Don "D-Dawg" Spratley (co.)	4:09
4.	"Just Tha Bitch N Me" (featuring Leicy Loc)	T. Hudson; M. Fields; A. Carraby; L. Fobbs	DJ Yella	4:22
5.	"Kuz Itz Like Dat" (featuring Gangsta Dresta & The Fyrm)	T. Hudson; M. Fields; K. McCloud; T. Middleton	DJ U-Neek	4:55
6.	"La La La" (featuring Traci Nelson)	T. Hudson; M. Fields; D. Weldon	Rhythm D	5:47
7.	"Do What Chu Gotta Do"	T. Hudson; M. Fields; A. Carraby	DJ Yella	4:35
8.	"Break"	A. Carraby	DJ Yella	0:13
9.	"Back 2 Da OG" (featuring Eazy-E)	T. Hudson; M. Fields; A. Carraby; E. Wright	DJ Yella	3:52
10.	"I Ain't Nasti"	T. Hudson; M. Fields; D. Weldon; M. Weymouth; C. Frantz; R. Belew; S. Stanley	Rhythm D	3:52
11.	"Giv Tha Azz 2 No 1" (Featuring George Shelby)	T. Hudson; M. Fields; A. Carraby; M. Rocker	DJ Yella	4:46
12.	"Kickin Azz" (featuring B.G. Knocc Out)	T. Hudson; M. Fields; A. Hinton; A. Carraby	DJ Yella	3:24
13.	"Kumin Attrackshun" (Featuring Gangsta Dresta)	T. Hudson; M. Fields; A. Carraby	DJ Yella; Don "D-Dawg" Spratley (co.)	4:46
14.	"Kruz Wit Me"	T. Hudson; M. Fields; A. Carraby	DJ Yella	3:50
15.	"Da Laz Zhit" (featuring Gangsta Dresta)	T. Hudson; M. Fields; A. Wicker; A. Carraby	DJ Yella	2:18
16.	"Outro"		DJ Yella	1:10

== Personnel ==
- Tanesha L. Hudson – main artist, vocals
- Makeba Fields – main artist, vocals
- Andre DeSean Wicker – featured artist (tracks: 1, 3, 5, 13, 15)
- Eric Wright – featured artist (track 8), executive producer
- Leicy Loc – featured artist (track 4)
- Traci Nelson – featured artist (track 6)
- Arlandis Hinton – featured artist (track 12)
- David "Rhythm D" Weldon – producer (tracks: 6, 10)
- Tim Middleton – producer (track 5)
- Don "D-Dawg" Spratley – co-producer (tracks: 3, 13)
- Mike "Crazy Neck" Sims – guitar & bass
- George Shelby – saxophone (track 11)
- Donovan "The Dirt Biker" Sound – mixing & recording
- Brian "Big Bass" Gardner – mastering
- David Bett – art direction, photography
- Allan Wai – design
- Matt Gunther – photography
