= DenGee Livin' =

Studio album by DenGee
- Released: May 23, 2000; September 25, 2001 (reissue)
- Genre: West Coast hip hop, Gangsta rap
- Length: 50:26; 59:36 (reissue)
- Label: Ronlan Entertainment; Black Rocket (reissue)
- Producer: E-A-Ski & CMT

187 Fac chronology
Fac Not Fiction (1997)	DenGee Livin' (2000)

Singles from DenGee Livin'
- 1. "VIP Status" Released: June 10, 1997

DenGee Livin' is the third studio album by American rap group DenGee (formerly known as 187 Fac). It was released May 23, 2000 on Ronlan Entertainment. The album was produced entirely by E-A-Ski & CMT. It peaked at number 81 on the Billboard Top R&B/Hip-Hop Albums. The album features guest performances by Spice 1, E-A-Ski, Silk-E, San Quinn, Mr. Town and T-Pup.

Along with a single, a music video was released for the song, "VIP Status", and features a cameo appearance by producer E-A-Ski.

Black Rocket Records reissued DenGee Livin' in 2001 with bonus tracks.

== Critical reception ==
Professional ratings
Review scores
Source	Rating
Rap Pages	(positive)

Rap Pages (7/00, p. 50) - "...Pure adrenaline rushes that increase the heart rate, make the hair on your neck stand up and send chills down your spine....a sonic triumph..."

== Track listing ==
1. "Intro" - 0:27
2. "Break Bread" (featuring E-A-Ski) - 3:24
3. "Den & Gee" - 4:09
4. "Over Some Dope" - 3:47
5. "Space Age Pimpin'" (skit) - 0:49
6. "Lucy Turf Walker" (featuring Mr. Town) - 4:23
7. "Da Hustle" (featuring Silk-E) - 4:09
8. "Broken Glass" (featuring San Quinn & T-Pup) - 3:42
9. "Ni** at the Movies" (skit) - 0:53
10. "Wig Split" (featuring Spice 1) - 3:53
11. "VIP Status" - 4:35
12. "Can't Wait" (featuring Silk-E, No the Piper & T-Pup) - 4:15
13. "Characters" - 3:44
14. "What Do You Want" - 4:11
15. "Palms, Elbows & Back Arms" - 4:04

=== 2001 CD reissue bonus tracks ===
The album was re-released September 25, 2001 with the following bonus tracks:

16. "VIP Status - (1 remix)" - 4:35
17. "VIP Status - (2 remix)" - 4:35

== Chart history ==
Chart (2000)	Peak position
U.S. Billboard Top R&B/Hip-Hop Albums	81
