= Fac Not Fiction =

Studio album by 187 Fac
- Released: August 26, 1997
- Genre: West Coast hip hop, Gangsta Rap
- Length: 54:47
- Label: Penalty Recordings
- Producer: Ant Banks, Clint "Payback" Sands, DJ Xtra Large, Ephriam Galloway, Ivan Johnson, Mike Mosely, Neil Levine (exec.), Spice 1 (exec.), Terrence "Bearwolf" Williams (exec.)

187 Fac chronology
The U.N.E. (1993)	Fac Not Fiction (1997)	DenGee Livin' (2000)

Singles from 187 Fac
- 1. "Graphic" Released: June 10, 1997

Fac Not Fiction is the second studio album by American rap group 187 Fac, released August 26, 1997 on Penalty Recordings. It was produced by Ant Banks, Clint "Payback" Sands, Ephriam Galloway, Ivan Johnson, Mike Mosely and Spice 1. The album peaked at number 81 on the Billboard Top R&B/Hip-Hop Albums chart. It features guest performances by Spice 1, Ant Banks, B-Legit, V-Dal, Big Lurch, Captain Save 'Em and the former member of the group Frank J.

== Track listing ==
No.	Title	Length
1.	"Tha Frontline"	3:48
2.	"Peer Pressure"	3:15
3.	"Fac Not Fiction" (featuring Spice 1 and D tha Poet)	4:41
4.	"Tool in tha Kut"	4:06
5.	"Faulty Characteristics" (featuring Ant Banks)	4:06
6.	"All Head No Body" (featuring B-Legit, Big Lurch, Gangsta P, Spice 1 and V-Dal)	5:11
7.	"Graphic"	4:56
8.	"2 Geez" (featuring Captain Save 'Em, Almon D and Frank J)	4:12
9.	"Man in the Mirror"	4:08
10.	"Ride wit Us"	4:13
11.	"Parkin' Lot Pimpin'" (featuring Frank J)	4:28
12.	"Fac Nic" (featuring Almon D and Frank J)	3:49
13.	"Paul Masson" (featuring DJ Xtra Large)	3:57

== Chart history ==
Chart (1997)	Peak position
U.S. Billboard Top R&B/Hip-Hop Albums	81
