= Askari X =

American rapper

- Origin: Oakland, California, U.S.
- Genres: Underground hip hop, political hip hop, conscious hip hop
- Years active: 1991–present
- Labels: Righteous Records, Slow Motion Records, Success Entertainment

Ansar El Muhammad (born Ricky Murdock), better known by his stage name Askari X, is a hip-hop artist from Oakland, California. He has released three albums, is on numerous compilation albums, and has been a guest on several albums. Stic.man and M-1 of Dead Prez refer to Askari X in their music and credit him as one of their main musical influences. Askari X advocates Black Power, Black Liberation, and Islam in his lyrics. His sound is characterized by slow drum beats and a verbal flow similar to Tupac Shakur. Askari X is philosophically aligned with the African People's Socialist Party and the Uhuru Movement. His style may be considered as conscious rap.

== Early life ==
In an autobiographical song titled "Moma" Askari X refers to experiencing domestic abuse against himself and his mother when he was 7 years old. He talks about being unsatisfied with school, experiencing persecution and systematic racism from the school system and the government. When he rebelled against the oppression he experienced in school, the school labeled Askari X as crazy and tried to place him in foster care.

Askari X joined the Bay Area, West Coast hip hop scene when he was 16 years old. His career started with the rap group the Righteous Black Guerillas (RBG). The neighborhood of 72nd and Lacey Street in Eastmont, Oakland, where some of the RBG crew grew up, was referenced in later Askari X songs.

Askari X encountered the Uhuru Movement, then Islam as taught by the Nation of Islam, which began as a prison study group. Both are major influences in his music.

== Music career ==
Askari X co-founded the group Righteous Black Guerillas who released the record Ansars in 1991. Askari X's first album, "Ward of the State", was released in 1992 while he was incarcerated. He has performed and recorded with Seagram, Rappin Ron & Ant Diddley Dog, 3X Krazy, Tajai from the Hieroglyphics, Mr. Ill, The Delinquents, & The Whoridas, Stic.Man of Dead Prez.

He has released three solo albums: Ward of the State with Righteous Records, Message to the Black Man with Slow Motion Records, and Return of Askari X (a.k.a. Ricky Murdock) with Success Entertainment. His career started with the Righteous Black Guerillas album Ansars. He co-produced the album by Dead Prez (M1 + stic.man) Presents – Get Free Or Die Tryin (Turn Off The Radio: The Mixtape Vol. 2)

Askari X has also appeared in several compilation projects, including the track "Fucked in the Game" on the album "Cell Block Compilation" produced by Cell Block and Priority Records, on the track "Rumble in the Jungle" on the album "Pusha' Man's Compilation" produced by The Road Productions, on the track "Peckerwood, Peckerwood" on the "International Blunt Funk Compilation" produced by In-A-Minute Records and Blunt Funk Records, on the tracks "Street Soldier" and "Rap" on the "Herm - Solo Album" produced by Black Power Productions, and the track "Fuck that P.D." on the album "The Monopolation" produced by Legal Dope Records.

== Personal life ==
In one interview between prison stints, Askari X referred to jail as “the hidden university,” saying that he wrote much of his rap material there. “The solitude gave me time and inspiration to come up with new raps," he said. As for the initial crime he was convicted of, he has always maintained his innocence. "I’m sure it was a set up...The police said that I robbed a bank and was armed, even though I had seven witnesses to prove otherwise," he said to an interviewer in a 1990s interview reiterating the lyrics of "Ward Of The State Pt II."

In 2010 and 2011, he was incarcerated at Folsom State Prison.

== RBG ==
Askari X has been credited by some sources as having created the term RBG as an acronym for "Righteous Black Guerillas" before Dead Prez. Askari X first used this meaning for RBG when he co-founded the rap group "Righteous Black Guerillas". Askari X was featured on a number of Dead Prez songs, including "Scared to Die" and the news report "Hood News" which was released on the DP album Get Free Or Die Tryin (Turn Off the Radio (The mixtape vol. 2 )). Dead Prez have credited Askari X in their use of the term RBG and have credited him in numerous tracks, including the track "Hood News" off their album "Get Free Or Die Tryin (Turn Off the Radio (The mixtape vol. 2 ))", saying "And today in the hood news: Where it might not be good news, but it sure is hood news, we ask what's really hood with the lock-down of Oakland RBG emcee Askari X."RBG is also known in this context as "Red, Black, Green", the colors of the flag of the Pan-African Movement, and has many other associated meanings.

== Discography ==
=== Studio albums ===
Ward of the State
- Released: 1991
- Label: Righteous Records
- Format: CD, Album
Message to the Black Man
- Released: 1993
- Label: Scarface Records
- Format: CD, Album
Return of Askari X (a.k.a. Rickey Murdock)
- Released: 2000
- Label: Success Entertainment
- Format: CD, Album

=== EP's ===
- Title: Recorded Live From The State Pen
  - Year: 1992
  - Format: Cassette tape
