= Truez Neva Stop =

Studio album by Havoc & Prodeje
- Released: September 9, 1997
- Recorded: 1997
- Studio: Audio X (Burbank, California)
- Genre: West Coast hip hop; gangsta rap; g-funk
- Length: 1:09:59
- Label: Pump Records; G.W.K. Records
- Producer: Tom Yamamoto (exec.); Havoc Tha Mouthpiece (exec.); Prodeje (also exec.); Tomie Mundy; Troy "Talkbox" Mason; Robert "Fonksta" Bacon; 2-N

Havoc & Prodeje chronology
Kickin' Game (1994)	Truez Neva Stop (1997)	Concrete Jungle Vol. 1 (1999)

Professional ratings
Review scores
Source	Rating
AllMusic	2.5/5 stars

Truez Neva Stop is the third and final studio album by American hip hop duo Havoc & Prodeje of South Central Cartel. It was released on September 9, 1997 through G.W.K. Records and Pump Records with distribution by Warlock Records for the Quality Records partnership. Recording sessions took place at Audio X in Burbank, California.

== Track listing ==
1. "Truez Neva Stop" – 4:53
2. "Still Gettin' Clowned" – 4:10
3. "If U Down Wit Me" – 4:01
4. "Fatality" – 4:13
5. "Bump" – 4:01
6. "Eastsider" – 5:11
7. "Da Clipp" – 4:08
8. "After Dark" – 3:57
9. "G'z Come Out" – 3:59
10. "Wake Me Up" – 4:58
11. "What Does It Take" – 4:46
12. "Get Yo Party On" – 3:57
13. "Hataz" – 3:49
14. "Now I Lay Me Down" – 4:06
15. "Paid n Full" – 4:57
16. "Capable of Murder" – 4:53
