= Kickin' Game =

Studio album by Havoc & Prodeje
- Released: October 25, 1994
- Recorded: January–September, 1994
- Studio: Kitchen Sync Studios (Hollywood, California); Echo Sound (Los Angeles, California)
- Genre: West Coast hip hop; gangsta rap; g-funk
- Length: 1:01:57
- Label: Pump Records; G.W.K. Records
- Producer: Havoc Tha Mouthpiece (exec.); Prodeje (also exec.); Tomie Mundy (co.); Robert "Fonksta" Bacon (co.)

Havoc & Prodeje chronology
Livin' in a Crime Wave (1993)	Kickin' Game (1994)	Truez Neva Stop (1997)

Singles from Kickin' Game
- 1. "G'z On Da Move" Released: February 7, 1995

Professional ratings
Review scores
Source	Rating
AllMusic	4/5 stars

Kickin' Game is the second studio album by American hip hop duo Havoc & Prodeje of South Central Cartel. It was released on October 25, 1994, through G.W.K. Records and Pump Records with distribution via Warlock Records for Quality Records. Recording sessions took place at Echo Sound and Kitchen Sync Studio in Los Angeles. The album peaked at number 59 on the Top R&B/Hip-Hop Albums chart, thus making it their only release to make it to the Billboard charts.

== Track listing ==
1. "Intro"- 0:54
2. "Charge It 2 a Bitch"- 5:07
3. "Kickin' Game"- 3:38
4. "That's the Way It'z Goin' Down"- 3:54
5. "Guess-A-Dad"- 1:30
6. "2 G R Not 2 G"- 4:01
7. "All I'm C'in iz G'z"- 4:01
8. "Endo Glide"- 4:12
9. "G'z on da Move"- 3:58
10. "Block 2 Block"- 4:45
11. "C U When U Get Out"- 4:26
12. "Only Lonely Homie"- 4:31
13. "Now I Lay Me Down"- 3:45
14. "M-Squads Nation Wide"- 6:02
15. "G'z Only"- 4:00
16. "Outro"- 3:13

== Charts ==
Chart (1995)	Peak position
US Top R&B/Hip-Hop Albums (Billboard)	59
