= Throw Your Hands Up (L.V. song) =

Single by L.V.

from the album I Am L.V.
- Released: 1995
- Studio: Paramount Studios (Los Angeles, CA)
- Length: 3:50
- Label: Tommy Boy
- Songwriters: Larry Sanders; Maurice Thompson; Jay Williams; Kenneth Blue; Andre Edwards; Anthony Criss
- Producer: Barr 9 Productions

L.V. singles chronology
"Gangsta's Paradise" (1995)	"Throw Your Hands Up" (1995)	"I Am L.V." (1996)

Treach singles chronology
"Throw Your Hands Up" (1995)	"Vibin' (The New Flava)" (1996)

Music video
- "Throw Your Hands Up" on YouTube

"Throw Your Hands Up" is a song by American singer LV. It was released in 1995 by Tommy Boy Records, as the lead single from his debut studio album, I Am L.V. (1996). Recording sessions took place at Paramount Studios in Los Angeles. Production was handled by Barr Nine members DJ Moe and Jay Supreme, who utilized samples from "Bounce, Rock, Skate, Roll" by Vaughan Mason & Crew. The song peaked at number five in New Zealand, number 24 on the UK Singles Chart, number 46 in Germany and number 47 in France. In the United States, it reached numbers 63 and 75 on the Billboard Hot 100 and Cash Box Top 100 charts.

== Track listing ==
No.	Title	Writer(s)	Producer(s)	Length
1.	"Throw Your Hands Up (Radio Edit)" (featuring Treach)	Larry Sanders; Maurice Thompson; Jay Williams; Kenneth Blue; Andre Edwards; Anthony Criss	DJ Moe; Jay Supreme	3:49
2.	"Gangsta's Paradise"	Sanders; Stevie Wonder	Doug Rasheed	4:00
3.	"Throw Your Hands Up (Kam Version Clean)"	Sanders; Thompson; Williams; Blue; Edwards; Craig Miller	DJ Moe; Jay Supreme	3:49
4.	"Throw Your Hands Up (Radio Edit W/No Rap)"	Sanders; Thompson; Williams; Blue; Edwards; Miller	DJ Moe; Jay Supreme	3:49

== Personnel ==
- Larry "L.V." Sanders – songwriter, vocals
- Kenneth Blue – songwriter, backing vocals
- Andre "Bokie Loc" Edwards – songwriter, backing vocals
- Devere Duckett – backing vocals
- Jasen Hodge – backing vocals
- Tamaira Thompson – backing vocals
- Josef Andre Parson – guitar
- Keefus Ciancia – keyboards
- Troy Mason – talkbox
- Maurice "DJ Moe" Thompson – songwriter, producer
- Jay Williams – songwriter, producer
- Jeff King – engineering
- Rob Chiarelli – mixing
- Michael Miller – photography

== Charts ==
Chart (1996)	Peak position
Australia (ARIA)	84
France (SNEP)	47
Germany (GfK)	46
New Zealand (Recorded Music NZ)	5
UK Singles (Official Charts)	24
UK Hip Hop/R&B (Official Charts)	5
US Billboard Hot 100	63
US Hot R&B/Hip Hop Songs (Billboard)	42
US Cash Box Top 100	75

== Certifications ==
Region	Certification	Certified units/sales
New Zealand (RMNZ)	Gold	5,000^{*}
^{*} Sales figures based on certification alone.^{^} Shipments figures based on certification alone.
