= Gangsta's Paradise =

Single by Coolio featuring L.V.

from the album Gangsta's Paradise, I Am L.V. and Dangerous Minds: Music from the Motion Picture
- B-side: "Fantastic Voyage"
- Released: August 1, 1995
- Recorded: 1994–1995
- Genre: West Coast hip-hop; gangsta rap; G-funk
- Length: 4:04
- Label: Tommy Boy; Warner Bros.; MCA
- Songwriters: Artis Ivey, Jr.; Larry Sanders; Doug Rasheed; Stevie Wonder
- Producer: Doug Rasheed

Coolio singles chronology
"The Points" (1995)	"Gangsta's Paradise" (1995)	"Too Hot" (1995)

L.V. singles chronology
"Gangsta's Paradise" (1995)	"Throw Your Hands Up" (1995)

Music video
- "Gangsta's Paradise" on YouTube

Audio sample
- Coolio feat. L.V – "Gangsta's Paradise": file; help

"Gangsta's Paradise" is a song by American rapper Coolio featuring American singer L.V. It was released as a single on August 1, 1995, by Tommy Boy, Warner Bros., and MCA Records. The song was written by the artists alongside producer Doug Rasheed, with additional credits going to Stevie Wonder for the interpolation of his 1976 song "Pastime Paradise". Certified platinum in October, the song was the lead single both the soundtrack to the film of Dangerous Minds starring Michelle Pfeiffer, and Coolio's second album of the same name, released in November. The music video, themed around the movie, was directed by Antoine Fuqua and featured Pfeiffer.

The song was the top-selling single of 1995 on the Billboard Hot 100 and the first rap single ever to go straight to number one in Britain. In 2008, it was ranked number 38 on VH1's "100 Greatest Songs of Hip Hop". NME listed the song at number 100 in their ranking of "100 Best Songs of the 1990s" in 2012 and Billboard magazine ranked it among the "500 Best Pop Songs of All Time" in 2023. Coolio was awarded a Grammy for Best Rap Solo Performance, two MTV Video Music Awards for Best Rap Video and Best Video from a Film and a Billboard Music Award for the song. The song was voted as the best single of the year in The Village Voice's Pazz & Jop critics' poll.

The song has sold over five million copies in the United States, United Kingdom, and Germany. Coolio performed this song live at the 1995 Billboard Music Awards with L.V. and Wonder, and at the 38th Annual Grammy Awards with L.V.

== Background and writing ==
Coolio, L.V., and Doug Rasheed composed "Gangsta's Paradise" and wrote its lyrics, with Rasheed also serving as the song's producer. Stevie Wonder received crediting for the composition and lyrics due to the interpolation of his song "Pastime Paradise" from his 1976 album Songs in the Key of Life.

The song begins with a line from Psalm 23:4: "As I walk through the valley of the shadow of death", but then diverges with: "I take a look at my life and realize there's nothing left." Adding to some of the religious overtones are choral vocals in the background. Coolio freestyled the first couple of lines, with the rest of the lyrics coming to him quickly in one sitting. He would later claim that the song ultimately came from a source outside himself, saying: "'Gangsta's Paradise' wanted to be born; it wanted to come to life, and it chose me as the vessel."

The chorus of the song, "Been spending most their lives living in a gangsta’s paradise,” was created by L.V. by stacking the vocals many times to make it sound like a choir.

Due to the sampling of Wonder's music, "Gangsta's Paradise" is one of the few Coolio tracks that did not contain any profanity, as Wonder did not appreciate his song being paired with it. Coolio said, "I had a few vulgarities... and he [Wonder] wasn't with that. So I changed it. Once he heard it, he thought it was incredible."

== Chart performance ==
The single reached number one in the United States, United Kingdom, Ireland, France, Germany, Italy, Sweden, Austria, Denmark, the Netherlands, Norway, Switzerland, Australia, and New Zealand, making it Coolio's most successful single. In Australia, the song stayed at No. 1 for 13 weeks, a record that would only be broken 22 years later by Ed Sheeran's "Shape of You". Following Coolio's appearance on Celebrity Big Brother 6, it re-entered the UK singles chart peaking at No. 31. In the United Kingdom, "Gangsta's Paradise" is the first rap single to sell over a million copies, as well as the first rap single ever to go straight to Number One.

In the United States, the single spent twelve weeks in the top two of the Billboard Hot 100, of which three were spent at No. 1 and nine at No. 2. The song was certified triple platinum by the RIAA on February 23, 1996, indicating 3 million copies sold. It has sold a further 1.8 million downloads in the US in the digital era as of September 2017. As of September 2022, the song had sold 1.9 million downloads in US and had accumulated 763.1 million streams.

Following Coolio's death on September 28, 2022, "Gangsta's Paradise" debuted two days later at number 5 on the UK Official Singles Sales Chart Top 100, and reentered the Official Singles Chart Top 100 on 7 October 2022 at number 55.

== Critical reception ==
Bill Lamb of About.com described the song as "riveting and atmospheric". James Masterton for Dotmusic noted its "undoubted brilliance". David Browne from Entertainment Weekly felt it "may be the bleakest tune ever to top the pop singles chart". He added, "With its ghostly choir and lyrics about a gun-toting 23-year-old who kneels in the streetlight wondering if he’ll live to see 24, it examines the abyss with journalistic coolness." Freaky Trigger praised it as "complete pop greatness". Idolator called it a "rap rhapsody", naming it one of The 50 Best Pop Singles of 1995. David Bennun from Melody Maker wrote, "That single. F*** me, it's good. The slow pulse of strings, the heavenly choir. Puts me in mind of prime Sisters of Mercy, of all things. Coursing at the rate of a slow heartbeat, point being, it's life as it is lived, it's in the blood. Like all the best rap, you feel the meaning, you sense it, before you even listen to the lyrics". Another Melody Maker editor, Taylor Parkes, said, "An oddly reserved, frustratingly MEAGRE moment. Coolio is, generally speaking, among the lusher, more intriguing gangsta rappers... "Gangsta's Paradise" limps a bit. Nice ominous, looped choir. Fits a little too comfortably on America's Top 10."

Pan-European magazine Music & Media commented, "Last year, this rapper hit paydirt with a reworking of Lakeside's "Fantastic Voyage". This time around, he pulls off the same trick with this tall tale founded on Stevie Wonder's "Pastime Paradise". Unlike the original, which surprisingly never was a hit, this one was a US number 1 and has every chance of succeeding in Europe." A reviewer from Music Week gave it four out of five, saying, "An infectious release from Grammy-nominated rapper that challenges the assumed form of the genre. Number one in the US and could do big things here." Music Week editor Alan Jones deemed it "a brooding and menacing track". Dele Fadele from NME named it Single of the Week, writing, "And what a breathtaking doleful and melancholy record 'Gangsta's Paradise' is. [...] Stabbing strings, a keyboard drone, a massed gothic chorus of gospel voices and a beat ticking time to the bitter end, are all weaved together into this solemn theme tune".

== Music video ==
The accompanying music video for the song was directed by Antoine Fuqua and features Michelle Pfeiffer reprising her earlier role as U.S. Marine LouAnne Johnson in the film Dangerous Minds. The video also includes scenes from the film. Initially Coolio was concerned with the video's treatment stating, "I wanted some low-riders and some shit in it; I was trying to take it 'hood'." Despite this, he trusted Fuqua and was ultimately pleased with the final result.

For the music video, Coolio won the Best Rap Video at the MTV Video Music Awards in 1996. It was also nominated for Best Clip in the category for R&B/Urban at the 1995 Billboard Music Video Awards.

The music video hit one billion YouTube views in July 2022.

=== Cast and credits ===
- Michelle Pfeiffer
- Coolio
- Directed by: Antoine Fuqua
- Sound editor: Jeff Clark

== Impact and legacy ==
In December 1995, NME ranked "Gangsta's Paradise" number 13 in its list of "NME Writers' Top 50 Singles of 1995". In 1996, it was named Best Rap 12-inch at the International Dance Music Awards in Miami. In 1999, The Village Voice ranked the song number four on its list of "Top Singles of the '90s". In 2008, it was ranked number 38 on VH1's "100 Greatest Songs of Hip Hop". In 2009, it was ranked number 91 on Entertainment Weekly's "The 100 Greatest Summer Songs", saying, "Slinky Stevie Wonder samples and somber lessons about the price of a life of crime. If that doesn't scream summer jam to you, then clearly you've never been a member of a violent gang or seen Dangerous Minds...fool." In 2012, NME ranked the song 100th in its list of "100 Best Songs of the 1990s".

In 2019, Billboard magazine ranked it number 20 in its list of "Billboard's Top Songs of the '90s". Same year, Stacker ranked it number 19 on its list of "Best 90s pop songs". In July 2020, digital publication The Pudding carried out a study on the most iconic songs from the '90s and songs that are most known by millennials and the people of Generation Z. "Gangsta's Paradise" was the song with the twelfth highest recognisability rate. In October 2023, Billboard magazine ranked it 166th on its "500 Best Pop Songs of All Time". The magazine praised its "magic moment"; "The song's climactic and heartbreaking final verse, when Coolio, born Artis Leon Ivey Jr., calls out, "They say I gotta learn, but nobody’s here to teach me/ If they can't understand me, how can they reach me? I guess they can't. I guess they won't … That's why I know my life is out of luck, fool." Same year, PureWow ranked it number two in their list of "The 53 Best 90s Songs of All Time".

== Parodies, covers, and sampling ==
There are several parodies of the song, including "Amish Paradise" by "Weird Al" Yankovic, which was released the following year, reaching number 53 on the U.S. chart. Coolio claimed that he did not give permission for the parody, which led to disagreements between the two. Yankovic claimed that he had been told Coolio had given the go-ahead through his record label, and apologized. Because of this incident, Yankovic now seeks approval for song parodies through the artists themselves, rather than communicating through intermediaries. Coolio himself said in a 2011 interview that he had since "apologized to him [Yankovic]", further stating in a Rolling Stone retrospective that objecting to the parody "was probably one of the least smart things I've done over the years."

L.V. released a solo version of the single in 1996 on his debut album, I Am L.V. This version did not feature Coolio, and featured additional lyrics written by L.V. himself, with rap lyrics written by Scarface and Dani Blooms.

In 1996, the song was covered by Battery for the electro-industrial various artists compilation Operation Beatbox and their 1996 album, Distance. American post-hardcore band In Fear and Faith covered the song in 2008. Austrian melodic death metal band Artas covered the song in 2008 on the album The Healing. In 2014, post-hardcore band Falling in Reverse covered the song for the compilation album Punk Goes 90s Vol. 2. The video included an appearance by Coolio. In 2015, Postmodern Jukebox produced a version in a 1920s jazz style. That same year, New Zealand hard rock band Like a Storm covered the song on their second studio album, Awaken the Fire.

The song's chorus and bridge were prominently sampled by British singer Ella Henderson for her 2024 single "Alibi".

== In other media ==
- It was first used in the 1995 drama film Dangerous Minds and was featured in its soundtrack.
- In 2011, the song featured in the comedy film Bad Teacher.
- The song featured in the superhero film The Green Hornet.
- The song appears in the 2013 action comedy film Pain & Gain.
- The song was also featured in various official trailers for the 2014 American comedy film Tammy, which stars Melissa McCarthy.
- In 2019, the song was used in the original trailer for Sonic the Hedgehog.
- The song appears in Season 1 Episode 1 of the 2019 show Raising Dion.
- UFC fighter Oban Elliott uses the song as his entrance music when he makes his walk to the Octagon.
- A remix of the song was used in Need for Speed (2015)'s official trailer on YouTube.

== Accolades ==
Billboard

- Billboard Year-End Chart-Toppers 1995
  - Top Hot 100 Single number one
  - Top Hot 100 Single Sales number one (2.5 million copies) (2× platinum)

Grammy Awards

- Best Rap Solo Performance
- Record of the Year (nominated)

MTV

- MTV Video Music Awards 1996
  - Best Rap Video

== Track listings ==
CD single
No.	Title	Length
1.	"Gangsta's Paradise"	4:00
2.	"Gangsta's Paradise" (instrumental)	3:49

CD single bonus tracks
No.	Title	Length
1.	"Gangsta's Paradise"	4:02
2.	"Fantastic Voyage" (original version)	4:05
3.	"Mama I'm in Love Wit a Gangsta" (clean radio mix)	4:09
4.	"Gangsta's Paradise" (instrumental)	3:50

CD maxi
No.	Title	Writer(s)	Length
1.	"Gangsta's Paradise"		4:00
2.	"Gangsta's Paradise" (instrumental)		3:49
3.	"Fantastic Voyage" (album version)	Coolio	4:04

== Charts ==
=== Weekly charts ===
Chart (1995–1996)	Peak position
Australia (ARIA)	1
Austria (Ö3 Austria Top 40)	1
Belgium (Ultratop 50 Flanders)	1
Belgium (Ultratop 50 Wallonia)	1
Canada Top Singles (RPM)	29
Canada Dance/Urban (RPM)	3
Canada (The Record)	5
Denmark (IFPI)	1
El Salvador (UPI)	3
Europe (Eurochart Hot 100)	1
Europe (European Dance Radio)	1
Europe (European Hit Radio)	4
Finland (Suomen virallinen lista)	1
France (SNEP)	1
Germany (GfK)	1
Greece (Pop + Rock)	1
Iceland (Íslenski Listinn Topp 40)	1
Ireland (IRMA)	1
Israel (Israeli Singles Chart)	1
Italy (Musica e dischi)	1
Netherlands (Dutch Top 40)	1
Netherlands (Single Top 100)	1
New Zealand (Recorded Music NZ)	1
Norway (VG-lista)	1
Scottish Singles Sales (Official Charts)	1
Spain (AFYVE)	20
Sweden (Sverigetopplistan)	1
Switzerland (Schweizer Hitparade)	1
UK Singles (Official Charts)	1
UK Hip Hop/R&B (Official Charts)	1
US Billboard Hot 100	1
US Hot R&B/Hip-Hop Songs (Billboard)	2
US Rhythmic Airplay (Billboard)	2
US Pop Airplay (Billboard)	17
US Cash Box Top 100	1
Zimbabwe (ZIMA)	1

Chart (2011–2025)	Peak position
Belgium (Ultratop 50 Wallonia)	50
Czech Republic Singles Digital (ČNS IFPI)	27
Global 200 (Billboard)	21
Germany (GfK)	27
Greece International (IFPI)	17
Hungary (Single Top 40)	2
Iceland (Tónlistinn)	14
Ireland (IRMA)	29
Lithuania (AGATA)	62
Luxembourg (Billboard)	22
Poland (Polish Airplay Top 100)	52
Portugal (AFP)	83
Russia Streaming (TopHit)	99
Slovakia (Singles Digitál Top 100)	99
South Africa (RISA)	100
Switzerland (Schweizer Hitparade)	14
UK Singles (Official Charts)	55
UK Hip Hop/R&B (Official Charts)	9
US Digital Song Sales (Billboard)	3
US Streaming Songs (Billboard)	33

=== Year-end charts ===
Chart (1995)	Position
Australia (ARIA)	1
Austria (Ö3 Austria Top 40)	21
Belgium (Ultratop 50 Flanders)	4
Belgium (Ultratop 50 Wallonia)	6
Brazil (Crowley)	37
Canada Dance/Urban (RPM)	45
Europe (Eurochart Hot 100)	5
Europe (European Dance Radio)	7
France (SNEP)	7
Germany (Media Control)	2
Iceland (Íslenski Listinn Topp 40)	1
Latvia (Latvijas Top 50)	5
Netherlands (Dutch Top 40)	23
Netherlands (Single Top 100)	5
New Zealand (RIANZ)	1
Sweden (Topplistan)	1
UK Singles (OCC)	2
US Billboard Hot 100	1
US Hot R&B Singles (Billboard)	30
US Cash Box Top 100	12

Chart (1996)	Position
Austria (Ö3 Austria Top 40)	6
Belgium (Ultratop 50 Flanders)	16
Belgium (Ultratop 50 Wallonia)	8
Europe (Eurochart Hot 100)	3
Germany (Media Control)	14
Italy (Musica e dischi)	7
Netherlands (Dutch Top 40)	66
Netherlands (Single Top 100)	55
Norway (VG-lista)	15
Sweden (Topplistan)	24
Switzerland (Scweizer Hitparade)	15
UK Singles (OCC)	86
UK Airplay (Music Week)	45
US Billboard Hot 100	33

Chart (2022)	Position
Global 200 (Billboard)	79
Hungary (Single Top 40)	78
Lithuania (AGATA)	88

Chart (2023)	Position
Global 200 (Billboard)	118

Chart (2024)	Position
Australia Hip Hop/R&B (ARIA)	47

Chart (2025)	Position
Global 200 (Billboard)	181

=== Decade-end charts ===
Chart (1990–1999)	Position
Austria (Ö3 Austria Top 40)	22
Belgium (Ultratop Flanders)	7
Netherlands (Dutch Top 40)	31
US Billboard Hot 100	13

=== All-time charts ===
Chart	Position
US Billboard Hot 100 (1958–2021)	98
UK Singles (Official Charts Company)	31

== Certifications and sales ==
Region	Certification	Certified units/sales
Australia (ARIA)	3× Platinum	210,000^{^}
Austria (IFPI Austria)	Platinum	50,000^{*}
Belgium (BRMA)	Platinum	50,000^{*}
Denmark (IFPI Danmark)	2× Platinum	180,000^{‡}
France 1995-1996 sales	—	300,000
France (SNEP) 2020 release	Platinum	200,000^{‡}
Germany (BVMI)	2× Platinum	1,000,000^{^}
Italy (FIMI)	2× Platinum	200,000^{‡}
Netherlands (NVPI)	Platinum	75,000^{^}
New Zealand (RMNZ)	3× Platinum	90,000^{‡}
Norway (IFPI Norway)	4× Platinum	
Portugal (AFP)	2× Platinum	80,000^{‡}
Spain (Promusicae)	2× Platinum	120,000^{‡}
Switzerland (IFPI Switzerland)	2× Platinum	100,000^{^}
United Kingdom (BPI)	5× Platinum	3,000,000^{‡}
United States (RIAA) (physical)	3× Platinum	3,100,000
United States (digital)	—	1,900,000
Streaming
Greece (IFPI Greece)	3× Platinum	6,000,000^{†}
^{*} Sales figures based on certification alone.^{^} Shipments figures based on certification alone.^{‡} Sales+streaming figures based on certification alone.^{†} Streaming-only figures based on certification alone.
