= Too Gangsta for Radio =

Compilation album by various artists
- Released: September 26, 2000
- Recorded: 2000
- Genre: Gangsta rap; hardcore hip hop
- Length: 1:17:46
- Label: Death Row; Priority
- Producer: Suge Knight (exec.); Ant Banks; Big Hollis; Big Hutch; Blaqthoven; Break Bread Productions; Daz Dillinger; Gary "Sugarfoot" Greenberg; Kenny McCloud; Kurt "Kobane" Couthon; LJ; Myrion; P. Killer Trackz; QD3; VMF

Death Row Records chronology
Suge Knight Represents: Chronic 2000 (1999)	Too Gangsta for Radio (2000)	Dysfunktional Family (2003)

Professional ratings
Review scores
Source	Rating
AllMusic	2/5 stars
RapReviews	4/10

Too Gangsta for Radio is a compilation album by Death Row Records, released on September 26, 2000. Production was handled by Cold 187um, Break Bread Productions, Kenny McCloud, Myrion, Quincy Jones III, VMF, Ant Banks, Big Hollis, Blaqthoven, Daz Dillinger, Gary "Sugarfoot" Greenberg, Kurt "Kobane" Couthon, LJ and P. Killer Trackz, with Suge Knight serving as executive producer. It features contributions from the late 2Pac, Crooked I, Dresta, Swoop G, Tha Realest, Above The Law, CJ Mac, G.P., Juice, K-9, Keitarock, Lil' C-Style, Mac Shawn, Nuttz, The Relativez, Twist and Young Hoggs, as well as Ja Rule, Scarface, The Lox and Treach. Most of the songs are diss songs projected at former Death Row artists, including Dr. Dre, Snoop Dogg, Nate Dogg and Daz Dillinger among others. Although the album sold poorly, it peaked at #171 on the Billboard 200, #44 on the Top R&B/Hip-Hop Albums and #15 on the Independent Albums charts in the United States.

== Track listing ==
No.	Title	Writer(s)	Producer(s)	Length
1.	"Intro"			1:12
2.	"Friendz" (2Pac)	Tupac Shakur; Quincy Jones III; Jalil Hutchins; Lawrence Smith	QDIII; Big Hutch	4:50
3.	"Gangsta Rap" (Crooked I featuring Treach and Scarface)	Dominick Wickliffe; Anthony Criss; Brad Jordan; Gregory Hutchison	Big Hutch	3:46
4.	"I Ain't Fuckin' Wit Cha" (CJ Mac)	Bryan Ross; Steven White; TaTa	VMF; Break Bread Productions	4:32
5.	"Everywhere We Go" (Above The Law)	Hutchison; Kevin Gulley	Big Hutch	4:11
6.	"Fuck Hollywood" (Tha Realest)	Jevon Jones; Myrion	Myrion	4:58
7.	"Murda for Life" (Ja Rule)	Delmar Arnaud	Dat Nigga Daz	4:20
8.	"In Too Deep" (The Lox)	David Styles; Jason Phillips; Sean Jacobs	P. Killer Trackz	3:30
9.	"Fuck Dre" (Tha Realest, Swoop G, Twist and Lil' C-Style)	Jones; James Parker; Twist; Ronald Gillion; Curtis Couthon	Kurt "Kobane" Couthon	5:07
10.	"Thug Nature" (2Pac)	Shakur; Jones III; John Bettis; Steven Porcaro	QDIII	4:08
11.	"Death Rizzo" (Crooked I)	Wickliffe; Myrion	Myrion	3:46
12.	"Projects" (Swoop G, Keita Rock and Juice)	J. Parker; Keith Parker; Derek Stevens; Kenny McCloud; Gary Greenberg	Kenny McCloud; Gary "Sugarfoot" Greenberg	3:56
13.	"Gangsta'd Out" (K-9)	Fredrick Hunter; Larry Johnson	LJ	5:41
14.	"Give It Up for Compton" (Dresta)	Andre Wicker; McCloud	Kenny McCloud	3:32
15.	"Real Type Gangsta" (Mac Shawn)	Deshawn Dawson; Anthony Banks	Ant Banks	4:14
16.	"The Coff" (G.P.)	Genaro Patterson; Walter Hollis	Big Hollis	4:10
17.	"This Is the Thanks You Get" (The Relativez and Nuttz)	Dajuan White; Wytony Dillon; Lee Harrison; S. White; TaTa	VMF; Break Bread Productions	5:03
18.	"Too Gangsta" (Dresta and Young Hoggs)	Wicker; Anthony Johnson; James Williams; Karoem Cormier; Lionell Tillman; Royce Mims; Anthony Ransom	Blaqthoven	3:58
19.	"Outro"			2:52
Total length:				1:17:46

Sample credits

- Track 2 contains an interpolation of "Friends" written by Jalil Hutchins and Lawrence Smith
- Track 10 contains an interpolation of "Human Nature" written by John Bettis and Steven Porcaro

== Personnel ==
- Gregory Hutch - production director
- Brian Gardner – mastering
- Larry Hawley – photography
- Don Smartt - engineer

== Charts ==
Chart (2000)	Peak position
US Billboard 200	171
US Top R&B/Hip-Hop Albums (Billboard)	44
US Independent Albums (Billboard)	15
