= Nutty Blocc Compton Crips =

Subset of Crips gang

- Territory: Compton, California
- Ethnicity: Primarily African-American
- Allies: South Side Compton Crips; Atlantic Drive Compton Crips
- Rivals: Acacia Blocc Compton Crips; Farm Dog Compton Crips; Spook Town Compton Crips; Tragniew Park Compton Crips
- Notable members: Dresta; B.G. Knocc Out

The Nutty Blocc Compton Crips (NBCC) are a "set" of the Crips gang alliance, based in Compton, California. The Nutty Blocc Compton Crips have been described as one of the larger Crip sets in Compton and several influential rappers have been associated with the gang.

== History ==
=== 1995 gang war with ATF ===
In 1995, the Acacia Blocc Compton Crips, Farm Dog Compton Crips and Spook Town Compton Crips were united in an alliance called "ATF". The ATF were rivals with the Nutty Blocc Compton Crips during this time.

On December 2, 1995, a group of Nutty Blocc Compton Crips carried out a drive by shooting on a parked car, which contained a group of ATF members, including a woman named Renika Jones. Jones was the girlfriend of Alfred Eugene Shallowhorn, who was an influential Acacia Blocc Compton Crips member. During the shooting, Jones, as well as two ATF members, were wounded. Jones was taken to Martin Luther King Jr. Community Hospital, where she died that night.

Following the death of Jones, Shallowhorn wanted to retaliate against the Nutty Blocc Compton Crips, so he and fellow ATF member Cortez Elliott drove to a house which was associated with the Nutty Blocc Compton Crips. From the house next door, emerged 16 year-old Angela Southall, 17 year-old Ronice Elisha Williams and 20 year-old Keane Lavell Faulkner. The three were not associated with the Nutty Blocc Compton Crips, but lived next door to the house which Shallowhorn and Elliott were targeting.

Upon seeing the three emerge from the house, Shallowhorn and Elliot opened fire, hitting the three victims. Southall and Williams were killed on the spot, while Faulkner died from his injuries later.

On December 6, 1995, Shallowhorn and Elliot were charged with first-degree murder.

== Notable rappers associated with the gang ==
Rappers B.G. Knocc Out and Gangsta Dresta were members of the Nutty Blocc Compton Crips.

The Game's father was a Nutty Blocc Compton Crip, and through his father The Game also had two half-brothers who were members of the Nutty Blocc Compton Crips. Both of these half-brothers were murdered.

The battle rapper Geechi Gotti also claims to be a member or affiliate.
