= Seventh Deadly Sin =

Studio album by Ice-T
- Released: September 12, 1999 (Internet); October 12, 1999 (CD)
- Recorded: 1998–1999
- Studio: The Crackhouse (New York City)
- Genre: West Coast hip hop; gangsta rap
- Length: 73:50
- Label: Coroner; Roadrunner; Atomic Pop
- Producer: Hen-Gee (exec.); Ice-T (also exec.); DJ Ace; Marc Live; Slej Tha Ruffedge; Trails Of Flowalistics; Ariel Caban; TR Love; Mad Rome; Bobby Ross Avila; Issiah J. Avila

Ice-T chronology
| Ice-T VI: Return of the Real (1996) | Seventh Deadly Sin (1999) | Pimp to Eat (2000) |

Singles from Seventh Deadly Sin
- 1. "Don't Hate the Playa" Released: 1999; 2. "Always Wanted to Be a Hoe" Released: 1999

Professional ratings
Review scores
| Source | Rating |
|---|---|
| AllMusic | 2.5/5 stars |
| Robert Christgau | 2.5/5 stars |
| Rolling Stone | 2/5 stars |
| The Source | 3/5 stars |
| Spin | 7/10 stars |

Seventh Deadly Sin is the seventh studio album by American rapper Ice-T. It was released on October 12, 1999, via Coroner Records/Roadrunner Records/Atomic Pop. Bazaro, Brother Marquis, Buckshot, CJ Mac, Deadly Threat, El Sadiq, Gripsta, King T, Marc Live, Numskull, Poppa LQ, Powerlord JEL, Radzay, Ras Kass, Slej Tha Ruffedge, Son Doobie, Tash and Top Gunz made their guest appearances on the album.

== Track listing ==
| No. | Title | Writer(s) | Producer(s) | Length |
|---|---|---|---|---|
| 1. | "Intro" | Tracy Marrow; Richard Ascencio | DJ Ace; Ice-T (co.) | 2:43 |
| 2. | "Don't Hate the Playa" | Marrow; Ascencio | DJ Ace; Ice-T (co.) | 4:05 |
| 3. | "Check Your Game" (featuring King Tee) | Marrow; Roger McBride; Issiah Joseph Avila; Kenny Laboriel; Denis Martinez | Iz; Trails of Flowalistics; Ice-T (co.) | 5:39 |
| 4. | "Get Your Moneyman" | Marrow; Laboriel; Martinez | Trails of Flowalistics; Ice-T (co.) | 3:38 |
| 5. | "The 7th" (featuring Marc Live, Ras Kass & Tash) | Marrow; Marc Giveand; John Austin; Rico Smith; Trevor Randolph; Ariel Caban | TR Love; Ariel Caban | 4:50 |
| 6. | "NY, NY" | Marrow; Giveand | Marc Live; Ice-T (co.) | 4:47 |
| 7. | "Valuable Game" | Marrow; Romy Geroso, Jr.; Andrea Martin; Rico Wade; Patrick Brown; Raymond Murray | Mad Rome | 4:35 |
| 8. | "Eye of the Storm" (featuring Buckshot Shorty) | Marrow; Kenyatta Blake; Bobby Ross Avila | Bobby Ross Avila; Ice-T (co.) | 3:54 |
| 9. | "Brother Marquis (Interlude)" (featuring Brother Marquis) | | Ice-T | 0:43 |
| 10. | "Always Wanted ta Be a Hoe" (featuring Ice's Ho) | Marrow; Ascencio | DJ Ace; Ice-T (co.) | 4:34 |
| 11. | "Fuck It" (featuring El Sadiq & Powerlord JEL) | Marrow; Divine Dubar; Marlowe Bates; Ascenscio | DJ Ace; Ice-T (co.) | 3:56 |
| 12. | "CJ Mac (Interlude)" (featuring CJ Mac) | | Marc Live; Ice-T (co.) | 0:47 |
| 13. | "Retaliation" | Marrow; Ascencio; Albert Johhnson; Kejuan Muchita; Tajuan Perry; William Griffin | DJ Ace; Ice-T (co.) | 4:21 |
| 14. | "Threat (Interlude)" (featuring Deadly Threat) | | Marc Live; Ice-T (co.) | 0:44 |
| 15. | "Check Your Heart" | Marrow; Ascencio; Shafiq Abdul Husayn | DJ Ace; SLEJ Da Ruff Edge; Ice-T (co.) | 4:49 |
| 16. | "Sondoobiest (Interlude)" (featuring Son Doobie) | | Ice-T | 0:32 |
| 17. | "Hardcore" (featuring Radzay, Bazaro & Gripsta) | Marrow; L. Washington; A. Calderon; Brandi Younger; Ascencio | DJ Ace; Ice-T (co.) | 4:57 |
| 18. | "Common Sense" | Marrow; Ascencio; B.R. Avila | DJ Ace; Bobby Ross Avila; Ice-T (co.) | 5:29 |
| 19. | "Numskull (Interlude)" (featuring Numskull) | | Ice-T | 0:16 |
| 20. | "God Forgive Me" (featuring Poppa LQ & SLEJ) | Marrow; Kenneth Green; Abdul Husayn; Ascencio | DJ Ace; SLEJ Da Ruff Edge; Ice-T (co.) | 4:08 |
| 21. | "Ice's Exodus" (featuring Top Gunz) | Marrow; Sudan Jeffers; Dubar; Abdul Husayn; Ernest Gold | SLEJ Da Ruff Edge; Ice-T (co.) | 4:47 |
| Total length: | | | | 1:13:49 |

Sample credits

- "Intro" contains dialogue spoken by Morgan Freeman from the motion picture Seven.
- "NY, NY" contains a sample from "New York, New York", written by Abiodun Oyewole, performed by The Last Poets.
- "Valuable Game", contains elements from "Don't Let Go" written by Ivan Matias, Andrea Martin, Rico Wade, Patrick Brown, and Raymond Murray.
- "Retaliation", embodies portion of the composition "Hoodlum", written by Albert Johhnson, Kejuan Muchita, Tajuan Perry, and William Griffin; performed by Mobb Deep.
- "Ice's Exodus", contains elements from "Exodus", written by Ernest Gold, performed by Felix Slatkin.
