= Real Muthaphuckkin G's =

1993 single by Eazy-E featuring Gangsta Dresta and B.G. Knocc Out

Single by Eazy-E featuring Gangsta Dresta and B.G. Knocc Out

from the album It's On (~~Dr. Dre~~) 187um Killa
- Released: August 26, 1993
- Recorded: 1993
- Studio: Audio Achievements (Torrance, California)
- Genre: G-funk; gangsta rap
- Length: 5:32
- Label: Ruthless; Relativity
- Songwriters: Gangsta Dresta; B.G. Knocc Out; Rhythm D
- Producer: Rhythm D

Eazy-E singles chronology
"Merry Muthafukkin' Xmas" (1992)	"Real Muthaphuckkin G's" (1993)	"Any Last Werdz" (1994)

Music video
- "Real Muthaphuckkin G's" on YouTube

"Real Muthaphuckkin G's", or "Real Compton City G's" in its radio edit, is a diss track released as a single in August 1993 by American rapper Eazy-E with guest rappers Gangsta Dresta and B.G. Knocc Out. Peaking at No. 42 on both the Billboard Hot 100 and Cash Box Top 100, and the most successful of Eazy's singles as a solo artist, it led an EP, also his most successful, It's On (Dr. Dre) 187um Killa. This diss track answers Eazy's former N.W.A bandmate Dr. Dre and his debuting, guest rapper Snoop Dogg, who had dissed Eazy on Dre's first solo album, The Chronic. The music video accompanying the song has over 400 million views on YouTube.

Upon hearing the diss, Eazy-E initially planned to release the single "It's On" for an upcoming EP. However, after meeting fellow rapper Dresta, Eazy was inspired to craft a different response. Dresta wrote the song’s lyrics based on stories Eazy-E shared about his rivals, and the addition of his brother B.G. Knocc Out, who improvised a verse, solidified the track.

Within the track, the trio challenges the authenticity of their rivals, their roots, new label operation, past musical involvements, looks, and claims of street credibility. Eazy also boasts about profiting from their success through contractual ties to Ruthless Records.

"Real Muthaphuckkin Gs" stands as one of hip-hop's most iconic diss tracks, often hailed as a masterclass in ruthless battle rap. Unlike earlier disses that focused on a rival's skills, Eazy-E’s track cut deeper by exposing his opponent’s past and dismantling their public image. The single's raw approach to rivalry influenced future diss tracks in the genre.

== Backstory ==
In 1991, Dr. Dre left N.W.A and, with Suge Knight, launched Death Row Records. It released Dre's The Chronic, which in 1993 broke gangsta rap onto pop radio. On the album, Dre and guest rapper Snoop Dogg, a star on the rise at the time, diss Eazy-E in skits, in the single "Fuck wit Dre Day" plus its music video, and, closing the album, in the hidden track "Bitches Ain't Shit."

To seize the moment, Eazy planned an EP, shorter than an album. Its lead single was originally slated to be "It's On." But an Eazy associate got word of two half brothers, both Nutty Blocc Compton Crips, who rapped. Recently released from several years of youth incarceration, Dresta had forged his rap skill through activities inside, whereby his reputation preceded him onto the streets.

Visiting the brothers' house, Eazy's associate found Dresta and took him to the studio, where Eazy told him tales of Dre. Dresta, thereby forming the song concept, wrote all the lyrics for an Eazy and Dresta duet. Yet the next day, Dresta brought to the studio his brother B.G. Knocc Out, who, improvising it on the spot, added a verse. On their hiring B.G. Knocc Out explained "Snoop got with Dre in the early ‘90s, and he basically stepped into a beef that really didn’t have nothin’ to do with him. But because Dre picked him up he got on the song “Dre Day” and he dissed Eazy. So around the same time me and my brother, Dre’sta Da Gangsta, we met Eazy, and we stepped into a beef that didn’t have nothin’ to do with us. And we end up dissin’ Snoop and Death Row and Tha Dogg Pound. ... We were just young, knucklehead kids who got into something that we didn’t really know nothin’ about. But because we was from the streets and we was used to dealing with beef anyway it really didn’t matter." And so Eazy's leading answer to Dre became "Real Muthaphuckkin' Gs."

== Content ==
The three "Real Muthaphukkin G's" rappers, claiming gangster authenticity, mock Dre and Snoop as studio gangstas who are in fact from the suburbs, though Dre promotes himself as sharing Eazy's famously tough hometown of Compton, California. He says Dre "ain't worth a food stamp". Also disputing Dre's masculinity, Eazy alludes to Dre's androgynous styling, by attire and makeup, in the 1980s DJ crew World Class Wreckin' Cru, which, in line with Los Angeles County's hip hop scene until N.W.A, was also an electro rap group, occasionally donning glitzy styling. In the process, Eazy briefly disses Snoop as an "anorexic rapper" who weighs "60 pounds" when "wet and wearing boots."

Back to Dre, Eazy disparages the sentiment that beating a woman makes one a man, as Dre's assault of TV personality Dee Barnes was highly publicized. Further, Eazy refers to the single "Fuck wit Dre Day" as "Eazy's pay day." Dre's contract with Eazy's label, Ruthless Records, left Eazy profiting from Dre's earnings through Death Row. Finally, claiming rumors that Death Row is Dre's "boot camp," Eazy calls its CEO, Suge Knight, widely known for strongarm tactics in the music business, Dr. Dre's "sergeant" and suggests that death is the penalty for not following his orders.

== Music video ==
The music video, written and directed by Eazy-E's longtime Ruthless video director Marty Thomas, was shot in Compton. It opens with aerial shots of Compton streets and scenes of lowriders, gangsters, and the metro Blue Line. There are numerous cameo appearances: Kokane, Rhythm D, Cold 187um, Dirty Red, Krazy Dee, Steffon, H.W.A., DJ Slip from Compton's Most Wanted, Keke Loco and H-Bone from N.O.T.S., Young Hoggs, Blood of Abraham, K9 Compton, H.B.O., and Tony-A.

Once Eazy-E, on camera, raps, "All of a sudden, Dr. Dre is the G thang / But on his old album covers, he was a she-thang," shown is a photo of Dre on a World Class Wreckin' Cru album cover, predating N.W.A, wearing a white, sequined jumpsuit and detectable makeup. Related cover photos appear several times during the video. Later in the video, Eazy is seen holding a pistol and alleges that Suge Knight would shoot Dre if Dre were to ever disobey him.

Previously, in Dr. Dre's music video for "Fuck wit Dre Day," actor and comedian Anthony "A. J." Johnson parodies Eazy-E as "Sleazy-E". In the "Real Muthaphuckkin' Gs" video, A. J. reprises the Sleazy-E role. As Eazy-E's music video opens, still jittering, Sleazy stands roadside, holding up the sign WILL RAP FOR FOOD. But Eazy's posse, including Dresta and Knocc Out, chase him through town, and finally pull him into a van. As the video closes, Sleazy lies, apparently dead, at his original, roadside spot. The censored version's video closes instead with Sleazy, running again, falling flat at a Leaving Compton sign.

Although paid in advance, Johnson failed to appear for his second of two days shooting. Eventually, he publicly confirmed the speculation that he had been threatened by Death Row or by its associates. Johnson explained that Suge Knight had summoned him to his office and threatened him with a gun, eliciting A. J.'s agreement to abandon the video shoot. Johnson informed Eazy of the threat, and recommended fellow comedian Arnez J to replace him in the video.

Eazy-E created a song titled "Yellow Brick Road To Compton" an enlightening track that persuaded the Mayor of Compton to give them permission to shoot the “Real Muthaphuckkin Gs" Music video. It is unfinished as his spouse stated in an interview that it is a Rough Copy and has scratch Vocals on it from Eazy-E.

== Legacy ==
“Real Muthaphuckkin Gs” is widely regarded as one of the most notable diss tracks of the early 1990s, often cited in discussions of hip-hop’s most prominent feuds. The song distinguished itself through its direct attacks on Dr. Dre and Snoop Dogg, challenging their credibility and public personas. It reached number 42 on the US Billboard Hot 100, becoming Eazy-E’s highest-charting solo single.

== Charts ==
Chart (1993–1994)	Peak position
US Billboard Hot 100	42
US Hot R&B/Hip-Hop Songs (Billboard)	12
US Hot Rap Songs (Billboard)	2
US Maxi-Singles Sales (Billboard)	21
US Cash Box Top 100	42

== Certifications ==
Certifications for Real Muthaphuckkin G's
Region	Certification	Certified units/sales
New Zealand (RMNZ)	2× Platinum	60,000^{‡}
^{‡} Sales+streaming figures based on certification alone.

== See also ==
- List of notable diss tracks
