= Menajahtwa =

American hip hop group

Background information
- Origin: Compton, California, U.S.
- Genres: Hip hop
- Years active: 1992–1999
- Labels: Ruthless; Relativity
- Members: Spice; Royal T

Menajahtwa was a female rap duo from Compton, California composed of female rappers Spice and Royal T. They were signed to Eazy-E's Ruthless Records in the 1990s.

== History ==
The duo made their debut in 1992 on Eazy-E's EP, 5150: Home 4 tha Sick on the track entitled "Merry Muthafuckin' Xmas" alongside Eazy-E, Buckwheat and the Atban Klann. Two years later, on August 23, 1994, Menajahtwa released their first album entitled Cha-Licious, which featured production from Eazy-E, DJ Yella, Rhythm D and DJ U-Neek. The album spawned two singles "La La La" and "Giv Tha Azz 2 No 1", however the album did not do well and neither the album nor the singles charted. Despite the albums' miscomings they would continue to make music and appeared on Eazy-E's 1996 posthumous song "Gangsta Beat 4 Tha Street", and on Adina Howard's 1997 "Swerve On". As well as writing Adina Howards "Freak And You Know It" produced by DJ Quik. In 1998, the duo rebranded as Twa-Zay and made a Double Album titled "Who'z Party". The main single of the album "Freaky Deaky" saw mild success but failed to chart along with the rest of the album. The duo disbanded the same year as the release of "Who'z Party" but remain friends to this day.

== Discography ==
Album information
Cha-licious
- Released: August 23, 1994
- Chart positions: N/A
- Last RIAA certification: N/A
- Singles: "Giv Tha Azz 2 No 1", "La La La"
Who'z Party (As Twa-Zay)
- Released: 1998
- Chart positions: N/A
- Last RIAA certification: N/A
- Singles: "Freaky Deaky"
