= South Central Cartel =

American hip hop group

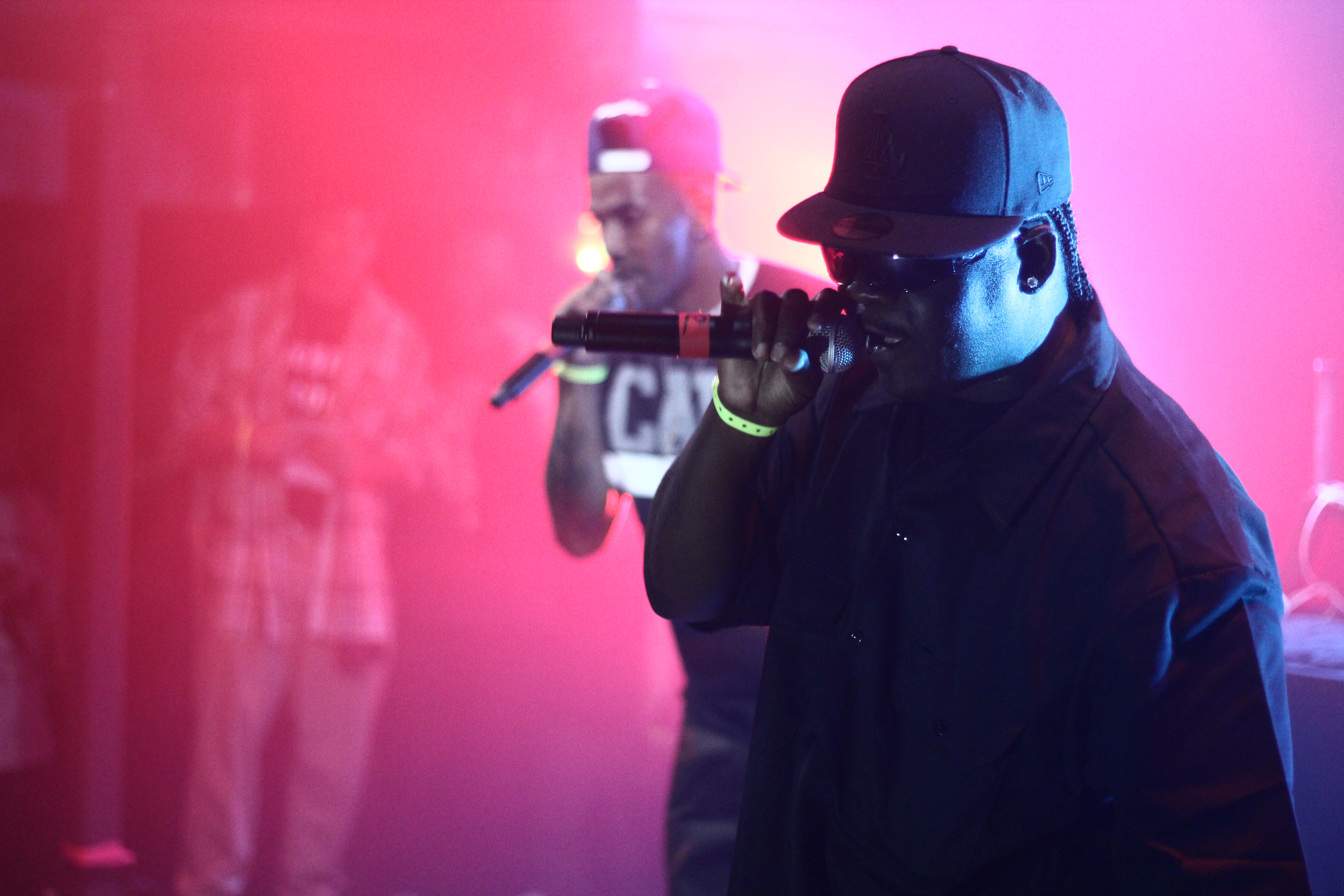
- South Central Cartel performing at Petit Bain in Paris in 2014.

Background information
- Also known as: S.C.C.
- Origin: South Central Los Angeles, California, U.S.
- Genres: West Coast hip hop; gangsta rap; g-funk
- Years active: 1991–present
- Labels: Pump Records; G.W.K. Records; Rush Associated Labels; Mouth Piece Entertainment; Kontacc Records; Gangsta Made Records; P-Vine Records
- Members: Havocc tha Mouthpiece; Prodeje; Havikk the Rhime Son; L.V. DJ Kaos; DJ Gripp; Young Prodeje

South Central Cartel is an American West Coast hip hop/gangsta rap group based in Los Angeles, California.

== Discography ==
=== Studio albums ===
Title	Year	Peak chart positions	
Title	Year	US	US R&B
South Central Madness	1992	—	51
'N Gatz We Truss	1994	32	4
All Day Everyday	1997	178	35
Concrete Jungle Vol. 1	1999	—	—
Gangsta Conversation	2001	—	—
We Have the Right to Remain Violent	2002	—	—
South Central Hella	2003	—	—
Random Violence	2004	—	—
Westurrection	2005	—	—
Chucc N It Up	2009	—	—
South Central Gangsta Muzic	2010	—	—

=== Collaboration albums ===
Title	Year	Peak chart positions	
Title	Year	US	US R&B
Murder Squad Nationwide	1995	106	12
Tha Hoodz in Us with Tha Floc Gang	2006	—	—

=== Compilation albums ===
- Greatest Hits (2003)
- The Greatest Hits Vol. 2 (2006)
- Cartel or Die: SCC's Most Gangsta (2007)
- SC Cartel Camp Presents Hood Favorites (2010)

=== Extended plays ===
- 2 Da West (2019)

=== Singles ===
Title	Release	Peak chart positions		Album
Title	Release	US Rap	US R&B	Album
"U Gotta Deal Wit Dis (Gangsta Luv)"	1992	30	—	South Central Madness
"Ya Getz Clowned"	1992	—	—	South Central Madness
"Pops Was a Rolla"	1993	19	—	South Central Madness
"Servin' Em Heat"	1993	—	—	'N Gatz We Truss
"Gang Stories" (featuring Mr. 3-2 & Big Mike)	1994	12	63	'N Gatz We Truss
"Seventeen Switches"	1994	—	—	'N Gatz We Truss
"It's a S.C.C. Thang" (featuring The Chi-Lites)	1995	—	—	Murder Squad Nationwide
"All Day Everyday"	1997	—	—	All Day Everyday
"S.C.G.'z"	1997	—	—	All Day Everyday

==== Soundtrack appearances ====
Title	Release	Artists	Soundtrack
"The Hood Got Me Feelin' the Pain"	1995	Havoc & Prodeje, Dawn Green	Tales from the Hood
"Sowhatusayin"	1995	South Central Cartel, MC Eiht, Treach, Sh'killa, Spice 1, Jayo Felony	The Show

==== Guest appearances ====
Title	Release	Artists	Album
"Six Million Ways"	1996	Killafornia Organization, Havoc & Prodeje, Young Prodeje	Killafornia Organization

=== Other related releases ===
- 1993 : Havoc & Prodeje - Livin' in a Crime Wave
- 1993 : Rhyme Poetic Mafia - Reign of Terror
- 1994 : Havoc & Prodeje - Kickin' Game
- 1995 : Mel-Low - It's a B.G. Thang
- 1996 : Young Murder Squad - How We Livin'
- 1996 : Sh'Killa - Gangstrez from da Bay
- 1996 : L.V. - I Am L.V.
- 1996 : Havoc & Prodeje, South Central Cartel & L.V. - The Gangstas In South Central
- 1997 : Havoc & Prodeje - Prelude to the Peace (UK only)
- 1997 : Young Rome & Evil Skeem - The War is On
- 1997 : Havoc & Prodeje - Truez Neva Stop
- 1998 : Young Prodeje - Diablo Flame On - Movie on Wax
- 1998 : Rhyme Poetic Mafia - The Root of All Evil
- 2000 : Hava Rochie (aka Havoc) - Self Made Legend: It's My Time to Shine
- 2000 : L.V. - How Long
- 2002 : L.V. & Prodeje - The Playground
- 2002 : Gangsta Reese (YMS) - Full Metal Jacket
- 2003 : Young Murder Squad - Don't B Scared
- 2004 : Big Prodeje - Hood Music
- 2004 : Big Prodeje - Random Violence (released in Japan)
- 2005 : Big Prodeje - If the Chucc Fits, Wear It!
- 2007 : Big Prodeje - Hood 2 Da Good
- 2007 : Hot Dolla (Murder Squad) - Streetz on Lock (EP)
- 2008 : Havikk the Rhime Son - The Rhime Son
- 2008 : Havikk the Rhime Son & Hirntot Posse - Worldwide Cartel
- 2008 : L.V. & Prodeje - Hood Affiliated
- 2008 : Young Prodeje - Gangsta Life
- 2010 : L.V. - Hustla 4 Life
- 2010 : Big Prodeje & DJ AK - What Side U On ?
- 2010 : Big Prodeje feat. Nasty prod. Ill Slim Collin - Till we die
- 2012 : Big Willie & Big Prodeje - Everythang Hood (EP)
- 2013 : Big Prodeje AKA Mr. Hood Good - The Realest Shit Ya Never Heard
- 2016 : D.CrazE the Destroyer ft. Insane LOC, South Central Cartel - The Reaper Project
- 2021 : Big Prodeje & Arcyn Al prod. Ill Slim Collin - On me
- 2025 : Havoc Da Mouthpiece - Gangsta Anthem Ft. B.G. Knocc Out, Jayo Felony & Blue Flame
- 2025 : Big Prodeje, E-Roc Young & Maccniph prod. Ill Slim Collin - Still Hustlin
