= L.V. (singer) =

American singer (born 1960)

- Born: Larry J. Sanders; December 2, 1960 (age 65); Los Angeles, California, U.S.
- Genres: R&B; soul
- Occupation: Singer
- Instrument: Vocals
- Years active: 1990–present
- Labels: Tommy Boy; Loud; P-Vine

Larry J. Sanders (born December 2, 1960), known professionally as L.V. (short for "Large Variety"), is an American singer, best known for his collaboration with rapper Coolio on the worldwide hit single "Gangsta's Paradise". He has released five solo albums and has been a member of the gangsta rap group South Central Cartel since 1994, usually singing the choruses. In 2019, L.V. was featured by NBC News after the Los Angeles Police Department designated him as a gang member or associate for the purposes of a heavily criticized database. On July 27, 2025, L.V. was featured on an episode of Last Week Tonight with John Oliver discussing gang databases.

== Discography ==
=== Studio albums ===
Title	Release	Peak chart positions			
Title	Release	AUS	GER	UK	US R&B
I Am L.V.	Released: 1996; Label: Tommy Boy	96	72	139	100
How Long	Released: August 29, 2000; Label: Loud	—	—	—	59
Hustla 4 Life	Released: March 17, 2010; Label: P-Vine	—	—	—	—
Still L.V.	Released: August 22, 2012; Label: Octave	—	—	—	—
The Art of Making Love	Released: March 15, 2017; Label: ESMG	—	—	—	—

=== Collaborative albums ===
- The Playground (with Prodeje) (2002)
- Hood Affiliated (with Prodeje) (2008)

=== Compilation albums ===
- The Gangstas In South Central (with South Central Cartel) (1996)

=== Singles ===
==== As lead artist ====
Title	Release	Peak chart positions							Album
Title	Release	US	US R&B	AUS	FRA	GER	NZ	UK	Album
"Throw Your Hands Up"	1995	63	42	84	47	46	5	24	I Am L.V.
"I Am L.V."	1996	—	87	—	—	—	42	64	I Am L.V.
"How Long"	2000	—	46	—	—	—	—	—	How Long

==== As featured artist ====
Title	Release	Peak chart positions										Certifications	Album
Title	Release	US	AUS	AUT	GER	NL	NOR	NZ	SWE	SWI	UK	Certifications	Album
"Gangsta's Paradise" (Coolio featuring L.V.)	1995	1	1	1	1	1	1	1	1	1	1	RIAA: 3× Platinum; ARIA: 3× Platinum; BPI: 5× Platinum; BVMI: 2× Platinum; IFPI AUT: Platinum; IFPI NOR: 4× Platinum; IFPI SWE: Gold; IFPI SWI: 2× Platinum; RMNZ: Platinum	Gangsta's Paradise and Dangerous Minds soundtrack
