= Michigan rap =

Subgenre of rap music

- Stylistic origins: Midwestern hip hop; Instrumental hip hop
- Cultural origins: Early 1980s, Michigan, U.S. (mainly Detroit); Mid-2019–early 2020 in Flint

Subgenres
- Detroit rap; Booty bass

Regional scenes
- Midwestern hip-hop

Other topics
- Instrumental hip-hop

Interactive map, Flint and Detroit points

Michigan rap is a subgenre of Midwestern hip-hop in the United States, including Detroit rap, Flint rap, and a style characterized by its "underdog spirit." Pivotal figures in the emergence of Michigan and Midwestern hip-hop scene include J Dilla, Eminem, MC Breed, and Big Sean.

In 2023, Rolling Stone described Michigan rap as "the regional style of intense punchlines and goofy music videos".

== Background ==
While Michigan has historically trailed behind New York City, Chicago, Los Angeles, and Atlanta in terms of the infrastructure and resources available to rap musicians, in recent years, Detroit and Flint have emerged as "havens" for a diverse music scene.

The presence of veterans and a burgeoning community of artists further contributes to the state's musical landscape.

== Characteristics ==
Two pillars of Michigan rap are Flint rap and Detroit rap, which prioritize driving drum beats, brooding low piano chords, and narratives in their lyrics.

The element of drum beats was popularized by J Dilla who used beat drum programming with live improvisation instruments. Dilla's style was hard to replicate, but the drum beats became a part of Detroit's style. The piano chords became a staple of Detroit hip-hop from Helluva with ominous piano cords that paired with the narratives in lyrics. Many artists used narratives for their songs and albums. Two main styles of Detroit lyricism are storytelling and street. Eminem created music with hyper-lyrical storytelling, while artists like Eastside Chedda Boyz and the Street Lord'z had a straightforward street style more indicative of the Detroit's identity.

Flint's version of street rap is powered by rough production, often including thudding basslines and piano loops, and a dark satire, devil-may-care approach to lyrics, similar to the Detroit movement. The style of Flint rap did not gain traction within Michigan until the late 2010s with the rise in popularity of Rio Da Yung OG. Flint rap is a newer scene that has a symbiotic relationship with Detroit. Flint performers could take advantaged of an established scene in Detroit, while the Detroit community hones and harnesses the talent to expand the scene.

== History ==
=== The 1980s ===
In Detroit The Electrifying Mojo, an FM radio DJ helped popularize hip-hop music in the area in the early 80s. Record store Future Funk Records featured a makeshift stage in the store where performers could play instrumentals and rap. Aspiring rappers would use the store until 1992, when the store closed. Jerry Flynn Dale, an emcee, launched Def Sound Studios in Detroit in 1985. Other significant figures for early Detroit hip-hop include DJ the Blackman, who helped teen emcees develop their lyrical skills in his basement and Detroit radio disc jockey Billy T helped popularize hip-hop in Detroit through his programs Billy T's Basement Tapes and The Rap Blast.

Dance also influenced the genre's early development. DJs like Jonzun and The Electrifying Mojo incorporated hip-hop elements into their sets, introducing the genre to Detroit's musical landscape.

The rise in hip-hop's popularity in Michigan was fueled by independent record labels like Inner City Records and the Hip Hop Shop, a Detroit record store. Artists like Esham, Esham Aarabia, and Rodney O & Joe Cooley emerged during this era. They addressed social and political issues facing their communities, reflecting the struggles of Detroit and its residents.

The 1980s was the foundation for Michigan hip hop. The continued growth of the Detroit underground scene set the stage for national recognition.

=== The 1990s ===
The 1990s saw the genre expand beyond its underground roots and emerge on the national stage. Michigan hip-hop artists, both old and new, found success on a larger scale.

J Dilla, a Detroit-born producer, emerged as a central figure in the 1990s. He revolutionized hip-hop production with his soulful, sample-based beats. His approach transformed the genre's sonic palette. Dilla's production work with artists like The Pharcyde, Q-Tip, and Janet Jackson elevated Michigan hip-hop to a wider audience. Slum Village, a trio of Detroit rappers and producers including J Dilla, released Fan-Tasmagoria (1997) and Fantastic 2 (2000), which both won critical acclaim.

Eminem, a Detroit-raised rapper, elevated Michigan hip-hop to global prominence in the late 1990s. His debut album, Slim Shady LP (1999), broke sales records, going x5 platinum. His music has been characterized by its dark humor, confessional lyrics, and technical rapping skills, resonated with a generation of listeners.

Kid Rock released his debut album Grits Sandwiches for Breakfast in 1990. Although this album featured a hip-hop sound, the rapper became known nationally for his rap rock sound. He signed with Atlantic Records and released his most successful album, Devil Without a Cause in 1998, which was certified diamond. His rise helped raise the profiles of other Detroit hip-hop artists Joe C., Uncle Kracker and Paradime.

Several female rappers, including Nikki D., Smiley, and Boss also came onto the scene in the 90s. MC Breed, originally from Flint, Michigan, launched his career in Detroit. Awesome Dre, Esham, and Insane Clown Posse all appeared in the 90s as well. The mid-90s would become known as Detroit hip-hop's "Golden Age."

=== Early 2000s ===
Now nationally known, hip-hop in Michigan experienced an even larger growth period in the early 2000s. Eminem became recognized globally, which brought the world's attention to Detroit's hip-hop culture. His success paved the way for others in his orbit to gain popularity like Hush, Proof, Obie Trice and Trick Trick, and the groups D12, and Bad Meets Evil. This time also saw staples from the 90s, like Slum Village and J Dilla, continue to increase in recognition and popularity as well.

==== 8 Mile ====
In 2002 8 Mile, a hip-hop biographical drama film produced and directed by Curtis Hanson, was released. The film, tells the story of Eminem's early career, documenting an influential period for Michigan rap. It grossed $242.9 million worldwide and won an Academy Award for best song, Lose Yourself, in 2003. The film brought in Detroit locals and Curtis Hanson said the goal was to create an authentic portrayal of this world.

New artists such as Big Sean came onto the scene. He was recognized on Kanye West's G.O.O.D. Music roster at 105.9 WDMK. Michigan's hip-hop in the early 2000s played a crucial role in expanding the genre's boundaries, showcasing a range of talents from across the state and region.

== Impact ==
There have been significant contributions to Michigan's hip-hop management by women, represented by leaders such as Chanel Domonique, Lauren 'Lo' McGrier, and Darylynn 'DeDe' Mumphord. They all manage talent, run events, and/or venues. Their support allowed for newer talents like Icewear Vezzo and Baby Money to gain recognition. Domonique founded 313 day, an event to pull Detroit's rap community together in one place.

Starting in the late 1980s J Dilla became known as an influential figure, whose work spread through the hip hop world. Although he passed away in 2006, his legacy has grown, reaching beyond hip hop into other genres. He has been called "a distinct influence on so many artists, whether they were traditional hip-hop heads, farsighted futurists, or home-studio 4-track operators."

Eminem has had a lasting impact on the genre as well as the city of Detroit. In 2002 he founded the Marshall Mathers Foundation, which looks to support disadvantaged and at-risk youth in and around Detroit. Beyond that, his artistic output has eared him recognition from the Detroit Historical Society. Eminem's impact extends beyond personal success; he helped put Michigan's rap scene on the global stage and gave Detroit a distinctive voice in the broader Hip-Hop landscape.

In the 2020s, according to The Fader, Michigan Hip-Hop style has been becoming more popular, becoming incorporated into other regional sounds. The cite Tee Grizzley’s “First Day Out,” Sada Baby and Drego's “Bloxk Party” and Lauri Markkanenthe as examples of Michigan's signature sounds, featuring "blown out 808s'' and "high-pitched snares." Other Detroit artists like BabyFace Ray, Baby Tron, and 42 Dugg are advancing the city's hip-hop sound. In the 2020s critics have called Detroit's rap underground the best in the country.

== Figures ==
=== Eminem ===
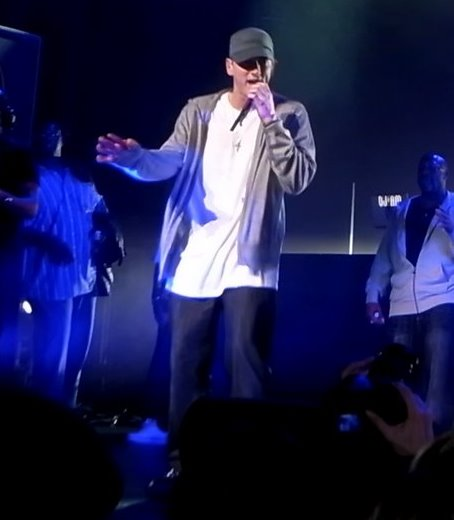
Eminem performing with D12 in May 2009

Marshall "Eminem" Mathers is an influential artist in the world of hip-hop. He dropped out of high school and worked, wrote, and performed to make a living. His EP "Slim Shady" came out in 1999 and led to work with Dr. Dre's eyes, who mentored him. He starred in 8 Mile, as a young Detroit rapper attempting to break into the music world. The movie featured his song "Lose Yourself" which won a Grammy.

=== Big Sean ===
Sean Micheal Leonard Anderson, known as "Big Sean," was born in 1988 in Santa Monica, California. When he was three, his family moved to Detroit. After high school, he was in an interview with 102.7 FM and Kanye West in 2005, where he showcased his freestyle skills. Big Sean later signed with the music label G.O.O.D Music in 2007. He released his first mixtape Finally Famous: The Mixtape that same year, which contained the local hit song "Getcha Some." In 2011 Big Sean released his debut album, Finally Famous, which peaked at number three on the Billboard 200. Three of his subsequent albums — Dark Sky Paradise (2015), I Decided (2017) and Detroit (2020) — had strong debuts. He parted ways with GOOD Music in 2021.

=== J Dilla ===
J Dilla or Jay Dee, born James Dewitt Yancey, is considered to be one of the most influential producers in hip hop and popular music. He was part of the group Slum Village and The Soulquarians. He collaborated with Madlib as Jaylib and is known for his final album was Donuts, which was released to wide acclaim. J Dilla's also worked as a producer for artists like A Tribe Called Quest, Common (rapper), Erykah Badu, and The Pharcyde. His style has been described as "off-kilter," "drunk" and "laid-back" style sampling style. His passing in 2006 had a big impact on the hip hop community. He has received honors from Dave Chappelle, the PLUG Awards, and has a portion of Nevada street in Detroit commemoratively named after him.

=== YN Jay ===
Jaylien Arthur-Henry Cantrell, known as YN Jay, is a rapper born in 1999. He gained recognition with the release of his debut mixtape, MVP, in 2019. In 2020, his track Coochie gained widespread popularity on social media. YN Jay's first two studio albums, Ninja Warrior and Coochie Chronicles were launched in 2021 under Alamo Records. His style is described as a mix of hip hop and trap.

=== Rio da Yung OG ===
Damario Donshay Horne-McCullough, born in 1994, is a rapper from Flint, Michigan. He goes by the name Rio da Yung OG and is signed with #Ghetto Boyz Entertainment. He is known for a raw and offhand style, mixed with humor. Rio's success grew in 2019 with the release of his single "Legendary," which has millions of streams and established his presence in the Michigan rap scene. Collaborating frequently with fellow Michigan artists such as KrispyLife Kidd, RMC Mike, Louie Ray, YN Jay, GrindHard E, and Georgia rapper Lil Yachty, Rio da Yung OG has expanded his musical community.

=== MC Breed ===
Born in Flint in 1971 MC Breed is seen as the start of the Flint Rap scene. He is best known for "Ain't No Future in Yo' Frontin,'" which peaked at No. 66 on the Billboard Hot 100 and "Gotta Get Mine," His debut album, "MC Breed & DFC," was released under independent record label SDEG Records. He embraced several influences including West Coast and dirty south. His 1994 album "Funkafied" reached 106 on the Billboard 200. In 2000, Breed ventured into acting with the straight-to-video film "Dollar" and its accompanying soundtrack featuring the hit "Ain't No Future in Yo' Frontin'." He continued to produce music until his death in 2008.

=== The Dayton Family ===
The Dayton Family is a rap group from Flint, Michigan. The group started in 1993 when Ira "Bootleg" Doorsey and Raheen "Shoestring" Peterson released "Dope Dayton Ave." The Dayton Family gained momentum with the inclusion of Matt "Backstabba" Hinkle and producer Steve Pitts. They signed with Po’ Broke, releasing their debut studio album, "What’s on My Mind," in 1994. The group's second album, "FBI (Fuck Being Indicted)," was released in 1996. While Backstabba was in prison he was replacement by Bootleg's younger brother, Ghetto E. Following. In 2001, Ghetto E, Shoestring, and Bootleg signed with Detroit rapper Esham's Overcore label and released "Welcome to the Dopehouse" in 2002. Their final album came out in 2011. The Dayton Family is known for their grim lyrics concerning poverty and survival. AllMusic has described their musical style as "potent hardcore rap". The group lists Run-DMC, Michael Jackson, LL Cool J, X-Clan, Spice 1, Esham, Natas and more as influences.

=== Tee Grizzley ===
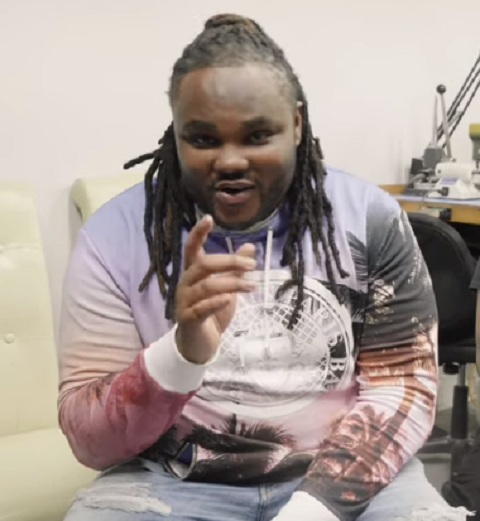
Tee Grizzley at Icebox in 2019

Tee Grizzley also known as Terry Sanchez Wallace Jr is an American rapper from Detroit who is well-recognized for songs such as "No Effort" “First Day Out" and other hit singles. During time in prison he created a mixtape with his single "First Day Out." It earning two million views on YouTube in under three weeks. The single "From the D to the A" (feat Lil Yachty) received double platinum certification by the Recording Industry Association of America (RIAA). His debut studio album, Activated came out in 2018. His fourth album, Tee's Coney Island was released in 2023.

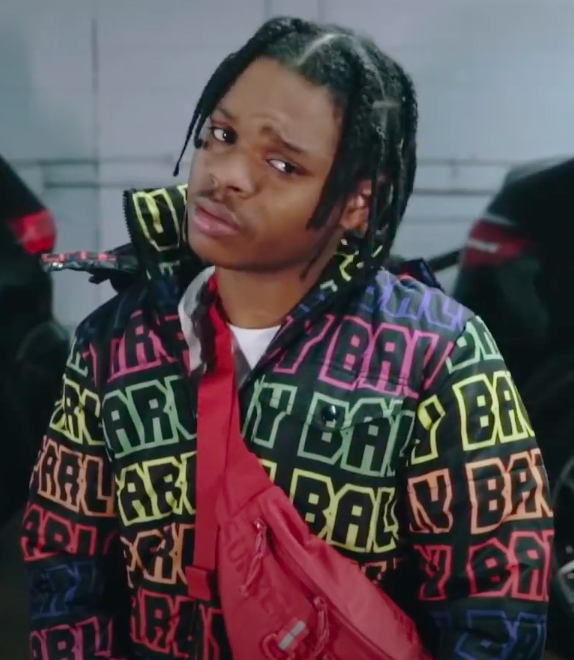
42 Dugg in the music video for "Narcos" by Mitch PNF.

=== 42 Dugg ===
42 Dugg born Dion Marquise Hayes is an American rapper well known for making collaborations with Lil Baby on hit songs such as "We Paid" and "4 Da Gang" with Roddy Ricch going quintuple platinum and gold, respectively as certified by the RIAA. He grew up on the Eastside of Detroit. Billboard named Hayes the "R&B/Hip-Hop Rookie of the Month" in May 2021. His whistle has become known as his signature sound.

=== BabyTron ===
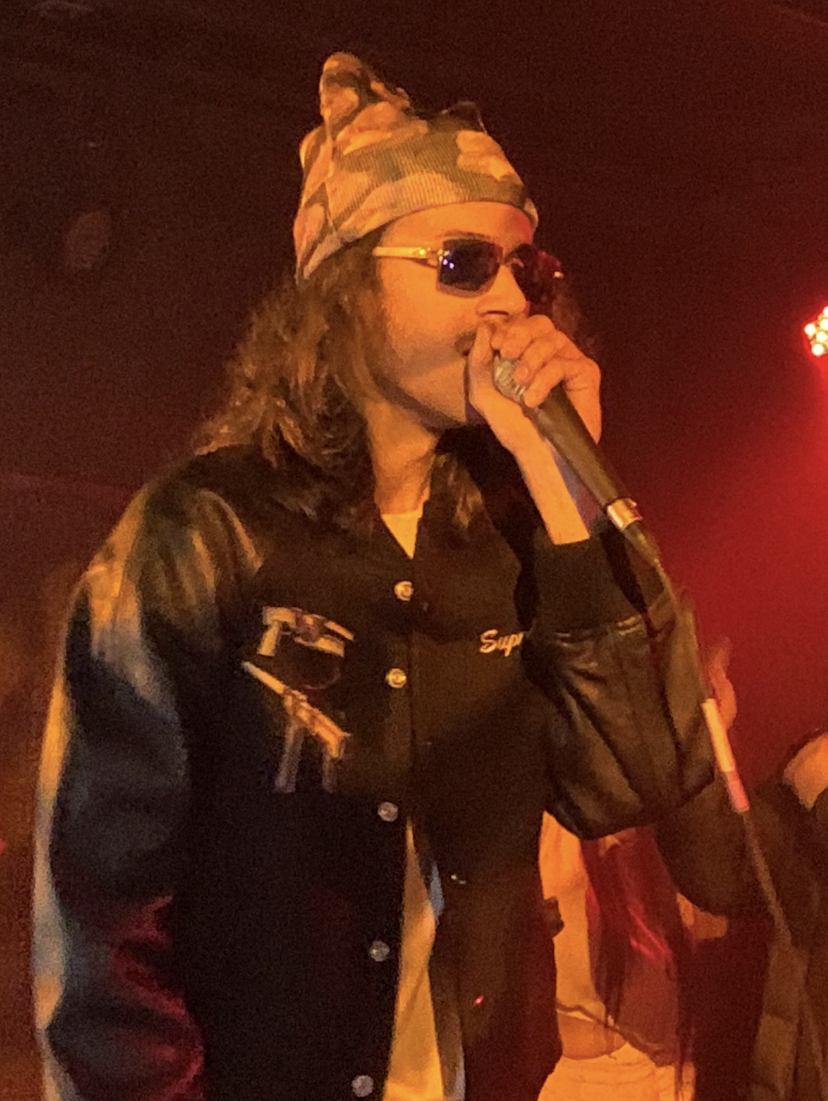
Babytron performing at the Knitting Factory in Brooklyn on April 19, 2022

James Edward Johnson IV, also known by BabyTron, was born in Ypsilanti, Michigan. BabyTron is most notable for his lyrical abilities and punchlines, as well his unorthodox samples which feature genres such as Rhythm and blues. His musical career officially started around age seventeen with the group "ShittyBoyz." He has worked with Lil Yachty and in 2022 he was named as part of the XXL 2022 Freshman Class, featured in a XXL freestyle rap cypher.

=== BabyFace Ray ===
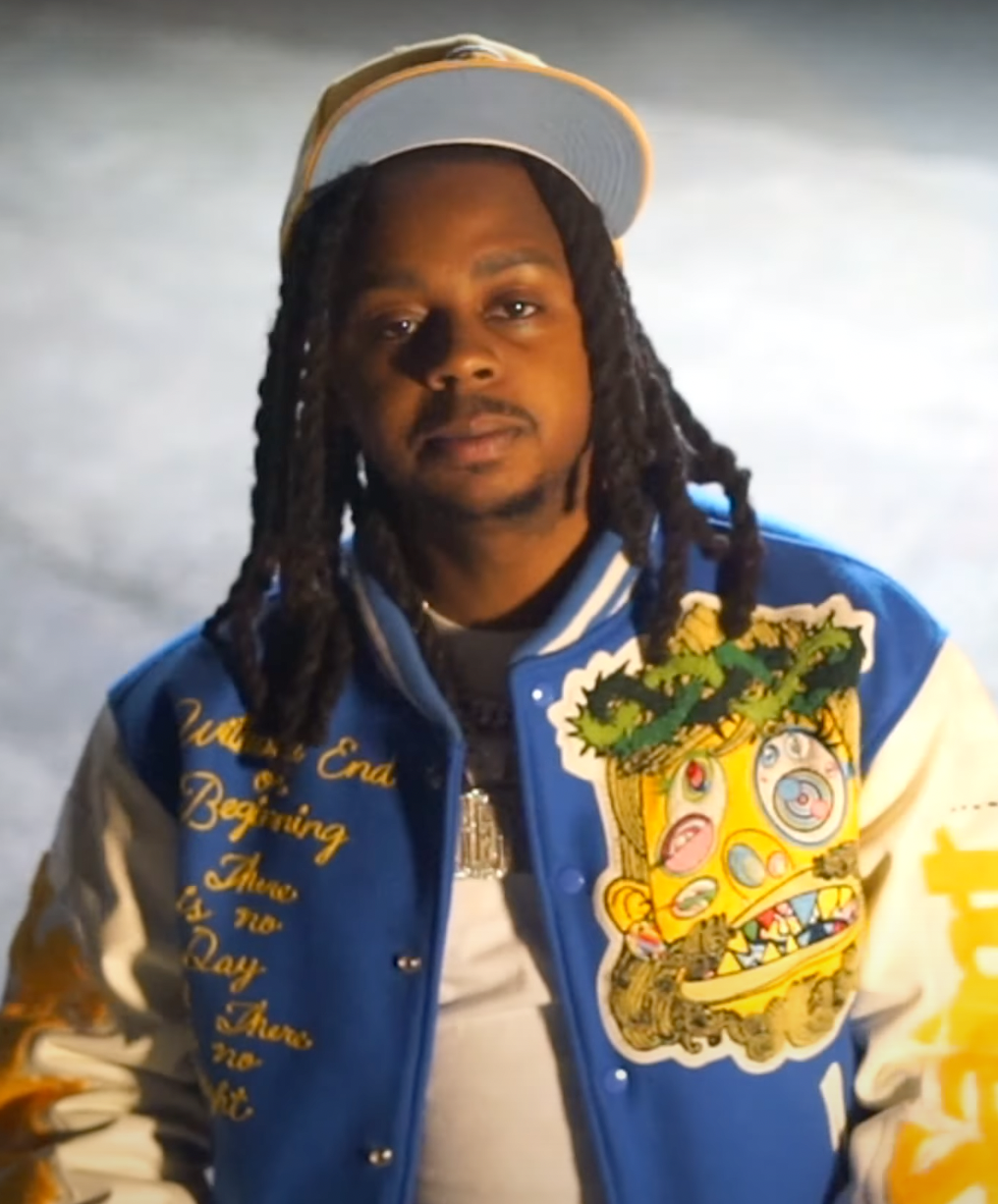
Babyface Ray in June 2022

Marcellus Rayvon Register, also known as Babyface Ray, is another Michigan born artist born in 1991. He is part of Team Eastside fellow Detroit rapper Peezy. In 2021 he released his first EP "Unfuckwitable," which reached 128 on the Billboard 200 charts. He appeared in the 2022 XXL Freshman class along with BabyTron, Cochise and Kali.

=== Kura ===
Daniel Ryan McAllister is another Michigan artist who was born in 2003. He began taking music seriously at 14 and later made maves after he began working with Pi'erre Bourne and signed to his label imprint SossHouse. Kura has often generated positive reviews for his music. His track "jjjound" was ranked at #24 on The Fader's "Rap Column’s top 30 rap songs of 2024" by Vivian Medithi. Medithi also recommended Kura and Bourne's collaborative tape Born Seditionary as a must-listen for fans trying to get into Bourne's music.

== See also ==
- Rappers from Michigan
- Rappers from Detroit
