= Saucy (album) =

Saucy, Vol. One

Compilation album by MC Breed
- Released: March 18, 1997
- Recorded: 1996
- Genre: Midwest hip hop
- Length: 64:28
- Label: Ichiban Records, One Puff Music
- Producer: MC Breed, Jazze Pha, DJ Flash, Big Q

MC Breed chronology
To Da Beat Ch'all (1996)	Saucy, Vol. One (1997)	Flatline (1997)

Professional ratings
Review scores
Source	Rating
AllMusic	2/5 stars
MusicHound R&B	2/5 stars
The Source	3/5 stars

Saucy, Vol. One is a compilation album by American rapper MC Breed. It was released March 18, 1997 for Ichiban Records and was produced by MC Breed, Jazze Pha, DJ Flash and Big Q.

== Track listing ==
1. "One Puff"- 4:18
2. "Da Bomb"- 5:18
3. "Salt in My Game"- 4:59
4. "Jazze Lude"- 1:08
5. "Swats and Flint"- 4:25
6. "You, Me and the Other Nigga"- 4:37 (featuring Sonji Mickey, Kool Ace, Jazze Pha)
7. "Make Me Wanna Scream"- 3:40 (featuring Sonji Mickey)
8. "Palms Itchin'"- 4:36
9. "Ashes to Ashes"- 4:46
10. "Clublude"- 1:18
11. "Money Makes the World Go Round"- 4:16
12. "First You Fuck Me"- 4:18
13. "Til We Die"- 5:37
14. "One Puff Symphony"- 6:20
15. "For Your Mind"- 4:52
