= Ringmaster (soundtrack) =

Music from and Inspired by Jerry Springer's Movie Ringmaster

Soundtrack album by Various artists
- Released: March 23, 1999
- Recorded: 1997–1998
- Genre: Miami bass; Contemporary R&B
- Length: 1:02:42
- Label: Lil' Joe Records
- Producer: Joseph Weinberger (exec.)

Singles from Ringmaster
- 1. "Take It Slow" Released: 1994; 2. "The Real One" Released: 1999

Professional ratings
Review scores
Source	Rating
AllMusic	2/5 stars

Music from and Inspired by Jerry Springer's Movie Ringmaster is the soundtrack to Neil Abramson's 1998 comedy film Ringmaster. It was released on March 23, 1999 through Lil' Joe Records, and consists of hip hop music. The album features songs performed by the 2 Live Crew, Freak Nasty, MC Breed, H-Town, 2Pac, Fat Joe, Ice-T, Indo G, Keith Sweat, Lil' Blunt, Lorenzo Smith and Trellini.

The soundtrack was not much of a success making it only to number 80 on the Top R&B/Hip-Hop Albums and featured "Take It Slow" peaking at number 94 on the Hot R&B/Hip-Hop Songs.

== Track listing ==
No.	Title	Length
1.	"Living in America" (performed by the 2 Live Crew)	4:28
2.	"Gotta Get Mine" (performed by MC Breed & 2Pac)	4:17
3.	"This Shit Is for Real" (performed by Fat Joe)	4:37
4.	"Ain't No Future in Yo' Frontin'" (performed by MC Breed)	4:01
5.	"Blame It on the Funk" (performed by Indo G & Lil' Blunt)	3:53
6.	"The Real One" (performed by the 2 Live Crew & Ice-T)	4:20
7.	"Da' Dip" (performed by Freak Nasty)	3:56
8.	"You Ain't Real" (performed by Verb)	3:24
9.	"Where Da' Party At" (performed by Verb & Brother Marquis)	4:24
10.	"Everything You Want" (performed by Freak Nasty & A.K. $hay)	2:36
11.	"If It's Alright With You" (performed by Lorenzo Smith & Keith Sweat)	5:18
12.	"Take It Slow" (performed by Trellini & Keven "Dino" Conner)	5:10
13.	"Jezebel" (performed by H-Town)	3:44
14.	"I Wanna Rock (Doo Doo Brown Version)" (performed by Luke)	4:40
15.	"Living in America (Miami Bass Version)" (performed by the 2 Live Crew)	3:54
Total length:		1:02:42

== Charts ==
Chart (1999)	Peak position
US Top R&B/Hip-Hop Albums (Billboard)	80
