= Funkafied =

Studio album by MC Breed
- Released: June 7, 1994
- Recorded: 1993–94
- Studio: KALA Studios (Atlanta, Georgia); Digital Edge Studios (Atlanta, Georgia); Curtom Recording Studio (Atlanta, Georgia)
- Genre: G-funk
- Length: 59:49
- Label: Wrap Records
- Producer: MC Breed; Flash Technology; The Hurra; Brett Ski; Big Man; Swift C

MC Breed chronology
The New Breed (1993)	Funkafied (1994)	Big Baller (1995)

Singles from Funkafied
- 1. "Late Nite Creep (Booty Call)" Released: 1994; 2. "Seven Years / What You Want" Released: 1994; 3. "Teach My Kids" Released: 1995

Professional ratings
Review scores
Source	Rating
AllMusic	4/5 stars

Funkafied is the third solo studio album by American rapper MC Breed from Flint, Michigan. It was released on June 7, 1994 via Wrap Records with distribution by Ichiban Records. Recording sessions took place at Kala Studios, Digital Edge Studios and Curtom Recording Studio in Atlanta. Production was handled by MC Breed, DJ Flash, DJ Hurricane, Brett Ski, Swift С and Big Man. It features guest appearances from Al Breed, Chuck Nyce, Gary Schider, George Clinton, Jibri, Night & Day, SFD and The D.O.C.

Funkafied was Breed's most successful album chart wise, peaking at #106 on the Billboard 200 and #9 on the Top R&B/Hip-Hop Albums. The album spawned three singles: "Late Night Creep (Booty Call)", "Seven Years"/"What You Want" and "Teach My Kinds". Its lead single, "Late Night Creep (Booty Call)", made it to the Hot Rap Songs chart reaching #43.

== Track listing ==
No.	Title	Producer(s)	Length
1.	"Underground Address"	Brett Ski	4:20
2.	"What You Want"	MC Breed; DJ Flash	5:10
3.	"Smokin'" (featuring SFD)	MC Breed; DJ Hurricane	4:37
4.	"Late Nite Creep (Booty Call)" (featuring Night & Day)	MC Breed	4:57
5.	"Teach My Kids" (featuring Gary Schider)	MC Breed; DJ Hurricane	4:04
6.	"This Is How We Do It 1" (featuring George Clinton)	MC Breed; DJ Hurricane	0:36
7.	"One Time" (featuring Chuck Nyce)	Brett Ski	4:27
8.	"Seven Years" (featuring SFD)	Big Man; Swift C	4:05
9.	"The Deal Is da Funk"	MC Breed; DJ Flash	4:10
10.	"Shootin' from the Hip" (featuring Jibri & SFD)	Brett Ski	4:47
11.	"Break Yourself" (featuring Night & Day)	MC Breed	3:19
12.	"Back up in Ya!"	MC Breed	4:16
13.	"This Is How We Do It 2" (featuring George Clinton)	MC Breed; DJ Hurricane	0:58
14.	"Flava Uv Phony" (featuring Al Breed of DFC)	MC Breed; DJ Flash	3:40
15.	"B.R. Double E.D." (featuring The D.O.C.)	MC Breed; DJ Flash	4:13
16.	"Ol' School"	MC Breed	2:10
Total length:			59:49

== Charts ==
Chart (1994)	Peak position
US Billboard 200	106
US Top R&B/Hip-Hop Albums (Billboard)	9
