= Draw the Line (Ghetto Mafia album) =

Studio album by Ghetto Mafia
- Released: April 26, 1994
- Recorded: 1993–1994
- Genre: Gangsta rap, Southern hip hop
- Length: 43:22
- Label: Ichiban
- Producer: Sedric "Swift" Barnett, Carl "Cooly C" Dorsey

Ghetto Mafia chronology
| Draw the Line (1994) | Full Blooded Niggaz (1995) |

Draw the Line is the debut album by rap group, Ghetto Mafia. It was released on April 26, 1994 through Ichiban Records and was produced by Sedric "Swift" Barnett and Carl "Cooly C" Dorsey. Draw the Line managed to peak at #79 on the Billboard's Top R&B/Hip-Hop Albums chart.

== Track listing ==
1. "Intro"- :57
2. "Life of a Sniper"- 3:52
3. "Everyday Thang in da Hood"- 4:03 (Featuring MC Breed)
4. "Special Delivery"- :29
5. "Mr. President"- 4:52
6. "Organized Crime"- 3:21
7. "Draw the Line"- 4:08
8. "Real Motha Fuckaz"- 4:17
9. "Cost to Be the Boss"- 3:18
10. "Facts of Life"- 4:25
11. "A-Town"- 4:58
12. "One Less Bitch"- :26
13. "Downtown Glory"- 4:16

== Chart history ==
| Chart (1994) | Peak position |
|---|---|
| Billboard Top R&B/Hip-Hop Albums | 79 |
