= The Mix Tape (MC Breed album) =

Compilation album by MC Breed
- Released: September 28, 2004
- Recorded: 1991–2004
- Genre: Hip hop, chopped and screwed
- Label: Ichiban Records
- Producer: MC Breed, DJ Crunk Mix, Mark Watson, Jazze Pha, DJ Hurricane, The D.O.C.

MC Breed chronology
| The New Prescription (2004) | The Mix Tape (2004) | The Hits (2007) |

Professional ratings
Review scores
| Source | Rating |
|---|---|
| Allmusic | link |

The Mix Tape is a compilation album released by MC Breed. It was released on September 28, 2004 for Ichiban Records and was produced by DJ Crunk Mix and Mark Watson.

== Track listing ==
1. "Teach My Kids"- 3:51
2. "This Is How We Do It, Pt. 1"- 4:23
3. "Just Kickin' It"- 3:43
4. "Game for Life"- 2:31
5. "Real MC"- 3:33
6. "Ain't Too Much Worried"- 2:56
7. "Night Life"- 2:58
8. "Comin Real Again"- 2:21
9. "Seven Years"- 3:45
10. "One Time"- 2:16
11. "Say What"- 4:19
12. "Everyday Ho"- 2:56
13. "Conclusions"- 4:40
14. "Tight"- 2:55
15. "Gotta Get Mine"- 4:17
16. "Late Night Creep"- 2:04
17. "What You Want"- 4:18
18. "Ain't No Future in Yo Frontin'"- 3:50
19. "Outro"- 2:34
