= The New Breed (MC Breed album) =

Studio album by MC Breed
- Released: April 27, 1993
- Genre: Hip-hop
- Length: 45:54
- Label: Wrap Records; S.D.E.G. Records; Ichiban Records
- Producer: MC Breed; Colin Wolfe; Warren G; The D.O.C.

MC Breed chronology
20 Below (1992)	The New Breed (1993)	Funkafied (1994)

Singles from The New Breed
- 1. "Gotta Get Mine" Released: 1993; 2. "Tight" Released: 1993; 3. "Everyday Ho/Flashbacks" Released: 1994

Professional ratings
Review scores
Source	Rating
AllMusic	4/5 stars
The Source	3.5/5 stars

The New Breed is the second solo album by American hip hop recording artist and producer MC Breed from Flint, Michigan. It was released on April 27, 1993, via Wrap Records with distribution by Ichiban Records. Production was handled by MC Breed, Colin Wolfe, Warren G and the D.O.C. It features guest appearances from 2Pac, DFC, Jibri, Admiral D and Black Ceasar. The New Breed found decent success, making it to number 156 on the Billboard 200 and number 16 on the Top R&B/Hip-Hop Albums chart in the United States. The album spawned three singles: "Gotta Get Mine", "Tight" and "Everyday Ho"/"Flashbacks". Its lead single, "Gotta Get Mine", reached number 96 on the Billboard Hot 100 singles chart, number 61 on the Hot R&B/Hip-Hop Songs chart, number 6 on the Hot Rap Songs chart, and appeared in 2002 film 8 Mile. Another single, "Tight", hit number 19 on the Hot Rap Songs chart.

== Track listing ==
No.	Title	Producer(s)	Length
1.	"Intro" (featuring Jibri)	MC Breed; Colin Wolfe	2:59
2.	"Tight"	MC Breed; Colin Wolfe; The D.O.C.	5:06
3.	"Gotta Get Mine" (featuring 2Pac)	MC Breed; Colin Wolfe; Warren G	4:22
4.	"Flashbacks" (featuring T-Dub of DFC)	MC Breed; Colin Wolfe	4:30
5.	"Comin' Real Again" (featuring 2Pac)	MC Breed; Colin Wolfe; Warren G	3:44
6.	"Just Another Clip"	MC Breed; Colin Wolfe	3:20
7.	"Watch Your Own Back" (featuring Admiral D, Black Ceasar & Jibri)	MC Breed; Colin Wolfe; Warren G	3:40
8.	"Conversations"	MC Breed; Warren G	3:38
9.	"Everyday Ho"	MC Breed; Colin Wolfe	3:52
10.	"Ain't 2 Good" (featuring Al Breed of DFC)	MC Breed; Colin Wolfe	4:32
11.	"Something 2 Smoke 2"	MC Breed; Colin Wolfe; The D.O.C.	3:39
12.	"Outro"	MC Breed; Colin Wolfe	2:32
Total length:			45:54

== Personnel ==
- Eric Tyrone Breed – performer, producer
- Tupac Amaru Shakur – performer (tracks: 3, 5)
- Dale Jabrigar – performer (tracks: 1, 7)
- Bobby T. Thompson – performer (track 4)
- Alpha "Al" Breed – performer (track 10)
- Admiral D – performer (track 4)
- Black Ceasar – performer (track 4)
- Colin Wolfe – producer (tracks: 1–7, 9–12)
- Warren Griffin III – producer (tracks: 3, 5, 7–8)
- Tracy Lynn Curry – producer (tracks: 2, 11)

== Charts ==
Chart (1993)	Peak position
US Billboard 200	156
US Top R&B/Hip-Hop Albums (Billboard)	16
