= Smothered, Covered & Chunked =

Smothered, Covered, and Chunked!

Studio album by Insane Clown Posse
- Released: August 14, 2012
- Genre: Hip hop
- Length: 54:00
- Label: Psychopathic
- Producer: Mike E. Clark

Singles from Smothered, Covered, and Chunked!
- 1. "Jump Around" Released: February 1, 2013; 2. "Beautiful" Released: March 8, 2017

Smothered, Covered, and Chunked! is a cover album by American hip hop group Insane Clown Posse. Released August 14, 2012, it was released alongside The Mighty Death Pop! and was never sold separately. It was prepackaged with the Red Pop variant edition of The Mighty Death Pop!, and is the group's fourth album with producer Mike E. Clark since his return to Psychopathic Records.

== Background ==
On April 20, 2012, Psychopathic Records released an infomercial for the album The Mighty Death Pop!, announcing that it will be available in three separate editions, each with a variant color cover and prepackaged with a bonus album. The first variant edition, dubbed the Red Pop edition, contains an album of cover songs entitled Smothered, Covered & Chunked, which features appearances by Psychopathic artists Twiztid, Anybody Killa, Blaze Ya Dead Homie, Jumpsteady, Cold 187um and DJ Clay, as well as Limp Bizkit frontman Fred Durst, the band Downtown Brown, and the rapper Lil Wyte. The title was originally announced as Covered, Smothered & Chunked, but later corrected to Smothered, Covered & Chunked.

On July 19, 2012, 30 second snippets of The Mighty Death Pop!, Smothered, Covered & Chunked, and the other two bonus albums pre-packaged with The Mighty Death Pop! were released on Amazon. A day later, the snippets were removed from the website per Psychopathic Records' request. On August 8, the album along with The Mighty Death Pop! and its other bonus albums were all released early in the 13th Annual Gathering of the Juggalos. The art for Smothered, Covered & Chunked was designed by a local Detroit artist and designer Patrick Hatfield and features traditional and digital illustration and design.

On January 9, 2013, it was announced that a music video for the cover for "Jump Around" was in production. The music video for the song was released on February 1, 2013, via Psychopathic Records' YouTube channel.

On March 8, 2017, the second single and music video was released for the song "Beautiful".

== Production ==
Insane Clown Posse contacted Fred Durst, as they sought to record a collaboration that no one would expect. Violent J said that Durst didn't want to be paid for his contribution to the album, as he "was just happy and surprised that we wanted him on it." Boondox was originally announced as having an appearance on "Mind Playin' Tricks On Me" during the Mighty Death Pop! infomercial, while the final released version featured Anybody Killa instead.

== Reception ==
Reviewing The Mighty Death Pop! for The Daily Blam, Kevin Skinner favorably reviewed Smothered, Covered & Chunked, calling it his favorite of the bonus discs, but did not assign the bonus album a star rating. The Oakland Press also considered it to be the best of the bonus albums.

== Track listing ==
The track listing for the bonus album Smothered, Covered & Chunked was released as part of the Mighty Death Pop infomercial. An updated version of the track listing has been confirmed.

Smothered, Covered & Chunked
No.	Title	Original artist(s)	Length
1.	"Prelude" (featuring Cold 187um and Psychopathic Family)	N.W.A	3:20
2.	"Jump Around"	House of Pain	3:21
3.	"Shout" (featuring Blaze Ya Dead Homie)	Tears for Fears	4:51
4.	"Ain't No Future in Yo' Frontin'"	MC Breed & DFC	3:49
5.	"Hold Still" (featuring Downtown Brown)	Yo Gabba Gabba!	2:22
6.	"Bitch Betta Have My Money" (featuring Fred Durst)	AMG	3:35
7.	"Night of the Living Baseheads"	Public Enemy	3:26
8.	"Beautiful (Indestructible)"	Christina Aguilera	3:34
9.	"Mind Playin' Tricks on Me" (featuring ABK and Lil Wyte)	Geto Boys	5:17
10.	"State of Shock"	The Jacksons and Mick Jagger	4:27
11.	"Love for Dem Gangsters" (featuring Cold 187um)	Eazy-E	4:19
12.	"Guess My Religion"	Willie D	6:25
13.	Untitled (Outtakes)	Insane Clown Posse, Psychopathic Records, & Downtown Brown	6:14
Total length:			54:00

"Jump Around" samples "Batman" by Neal Hefti
