= To Da Beat Ch'all =

Studio album by MC Breed
- Released: May 14, 1996
- Recorded: 1995–96
- Studio: Purple Dragon Studios; KALA Studios; DARP Studios; One Puff Studios
- Genre: Hip-hop
- Length: 1:03:46
- Label: Wrap
- Producer: Avery Johnson; DJ Hurricane; Erick Sermon; Jazze Pha; L-Roc; MC Breed; Paxton Miller

MC Breed chronology
Big Baller (1995)	To Da Beat Ch'all (1996)	Flatline (1997)

Professional ratings
Review scores
Source	Rating
AllMusic	3/5 stars

To Da Beat Ch'all is the fifth solo studio album by American rapper and record producer MC Breed. It was released on May 14, 1996, through Wrap Records with distribution via Ichiban Records. Recording sessions took place at Purple Dragon Studios, KALA Studios, DARP Studios and One Puff Studios. Production was handled by Jazze Pha, Avery Johnson, DJ Hurricane, Erick Sermon, L-Roc, Paxton Miller, and MC Breed himself. It features guest appearances from Chuck Nyce, DJ Hurricane, Erick Sermon, Jamal, Jazze Pha, M.C. Brains and Passion. In the United States, the album peaked at number 34 on the Top R&B/Hip-Hop Albums chart.

== Track listing ==
No.	Title	Writer(s)	Producer(s)	Length
1.	"Intro"			2:13
2.	"Cum Clean"	Eric Breed	MC Breed; LRoc; Avery Johnson	3:48
3.	"Choose One" (featuring M.C. Brains)	E. Breed; James Davis	MC Breed; Jazze Pha	5:11
4.	"Evil That Men Do"	E. Breed	MC Breed	4:31
5.	"My Walls"	E. Breed; Phalon Alexander	Jazze Pha	4:12
6.	"Like This"	E. Breed	MC Breed	4:26
7.	"Same Thang"	E. Breed; Paxton Miller; Allen McPherson	Paxton Miller	3:30
8.	"16 Switches"	E. Breed; Boo Boo Breed	MC Breed	5:17
9.	"To da Beat Ch'all" (featuring Erick Sermon)	E. Breed; Erick Sermon	Erick Sermon	4:13
10.	"No Chaser" (featuring DJ Hurricane and Jazze Pha)	E. Breed; Wendell Fite; Alexander	DJ Hurricane	4:45
11.	"Stop That"	E. Breed; Alexander; B. Breed	Jazze Pha	4:24
12.	"U Can't See Me"	E. Breed; Alexander; Zachary Wallace	MC Breed; Jazze Pha (co.)	4:35
13.	"Cleverness" (featuring Passion, Jamal and Chuck Nyce)	E. Breed; Passion Johnson; Jamal Phillips; Chuck Nyce	MC Breed	5:12
14.	"Go There"	E. Breed	MC Breed	2:58
15.	"Flossin'"	E. Breed; Wallace; Jamahr Williams	MC Breed	4:31
Total length:				1:03:46

== Personnel ==
- Eric "MC Breed" Breed — vocals, producer (tracks: 2–4, 6, 8, 12–15), programming (track 15)
- Tracy "The D.O.C." Curry — additional vocals (track 2)
- James "M.C. Brains" Davis — vocals (track 3)
- Phalon "Jazze Pha" Alexander — vocals (track 10), additional vocals (tracks: 4, 5, 12), producer (tracks: 3, 5, 11), co-producer (track 12), programming (tracks: 9, 15)
- Sonji Mickey — additional vocals (tracks: 4–6, 12)
- Erick Sermon — vocals & producer (track 9)
- Wendell "DJ Hurricane" Fite — vocals & producer (track 10)
- Passion Johnson — vocals (track 13)
- Jamal "Mally G" Phillips — vocals (track 13)
- Chuck Nyce — vocals (track 13)
- Avery Johnson — bass (tracks: 4, 6), producer (track 2)
- Clay Lewis — guitar (track 5)
- James "LRoc" Phillips — keyboards (track 6), producer (track 2)
- Carlos Glover — guitar (track 14)
- Paxton Miller — producer (track 7)
- Tim Harrigan — recording & mixing (tracks: 1, 2, 4, 6, 9, 10, 12, 14, 15)
- Edd Miller — recording & mixing (tracks: 3, 5, 7, 11)
- Jimmy O'Neill — recording & mixing (tracks: 3, 5, 7, 11)
- Darin Prindle — recording & mixing (track 13)
- Emmitt Martin — photography
- Cole Gerst — additional photography
- Holly Thompson — photography assistant

== Charts ==
Chart (1996)	Peak position
US Top R&B/Hip-Hop Albums (Billboard)	34
