= Top Authority =

American hip hop group

- Origin: Flint, Michigan, U.S.
- Genres: Midwest hip hop; g-funk; gangsta rap; underground hip hop
- Years active: 1990s
- Labels: TRAK Records; Wrap Records; Top Flight Records
- Members: Shotgun; Flex; DaLo

Top Authority is an American hip hop trio from Flint, Michigan, composed of rappers Dia "Shotgun" Peacock, Diallo "Flex" Peacock and producer David "DaLo" Hornaday. They were one of the first rap groups from Flint and among the earliest of the underground Midwest hip hop scene to release a nationally recognized album. Bootleg, a member of the slightly later Flint group The Dayton Family, told Murder Dog magazine, "We grew up together, same hood. We'd be together every day. That's family". He lists them as leading lights in Flint music, along with acts like Ready for the World and MC Breed. Rapper Chilla Pertilla defined Northern hip hop to Murderdog as "Eminem, Twista, Bone, Breed, Dayton Family, Top Authority, Esham, and ICP".

They first came to public attention with the single "93 (Things Ain't How They Should Be)" from their debut album Something to Blaze To. The "rolling g-funk trio" (as John Bush of AllMusic described members Shotgun, Flex and DaLo) followed up with Rated G, their sophomore album in 1995. It featured scratches from DJ Aladdin and reached #144 on the Billboard 200 albums chart in the United States. AllMusic considers 1997's Top Authority Uncut (The New Yea) to be their best release. It peaked at #192 on the Billboard 200, spawning the single "World War III" charting at #37 on Billboard Hot Rap Songs. In 2009, Top Authority returned with their fourth album, Kush Music, on which MC Breed and Do or Die made guest appearances.

== Discography ==
=== Albums ===
List of studio albums, with selected chart positions
Title	Album details	Peak chart positions		
Title	Album details	US	US R&B	US Heat.
Somethin' to Blaze To	Released: 1993; Label: TRAK Records	—	21	19
Rated G	Released: November 21, 1995; Label: TRAK Records	144	16	—
Top Authority Uncut (The New Yea)	Released: October 21, 1997; Label: Wrap Records, Ichiban	192	21	—
Kush Music	Released: 2009; Label: Top Flight Records	—	—	—
"—" denotes a recording that did not chart.

=== Singles ===
List of singles, with selected chart positions, showing year released and album name
Title	Year	Peak chart positions	Album
Title	Year	US Rap	Album
"93"	1993	—	Somethin' to Blaze To
"How Much Can a Brother Take"	1994	—	Somethin' to Blaze To
"Livin' 2 Die"	1995	—	Rated G
"Playaz"/"Dope Game"	1997	—	Top Authority Uncut (The New Yea)
"World War III"	1998	37	Top Authority Uncut (The New Yea)
"—" denotes a recording that did not chart or was not released in that territory.
