= The Hits (MC Breed album) =

Greatest hits album by MC Breed
- Released: January 23, 2007
- Recorded: 1991–2007
- Genre: Hip hop, G-funk, gangsta rap
- Label: Power Records
- Producer: MC Breed, LeRoy McMath

MC Breed chronology
The Mix Tape (2004)	The Hits (2007)

The Hits is a compilation album by American rappers, MC Breed and DFC. It was released January 23, 2007 by MC Breed's former label, Power Records. This was the last compilation released before his unexpected death in late 2008.

== Track listing ==
1. "Coming Real"- 3:46 (featuring 2Pac)
2. "It's All Good"- 4:26
3. "Caps Get Peal"- 4:08 (featuring MC Eiht)
4. "2-2 Da Chess"- 4:40
5. "What We Do for Cheese"- 4:15
6. "Ain't No Future"- 4:06
7. "Rule #1"- 3:43 (featuring Pimp C, Kurupt)
8. "Bitches"- 3:17 (featuring Too Short)
9. "Gangsta Shit"- 5:08
10. "Digga Bigga Ditch"- 4:34
11. "Thats Whats Up"- 3:14
12. "Off in the Club"- 4:18
13. "Gotta Get Mine"- 4:23 (featuring 2Pac)
14. "Blaugh"- 4:35
