= Better Now (disambiguation) =

"Better Now" is a 2018 song by Post Malone.

Better Now may also refer to:

- "Better Now" (Collective Soul song), 2004
- "Better Now" (Måns Zelmerlöw song), 2019
- "Better Now", a 2022 song by Odesza
- "Better Now", a song by MC Breed from the 1999 album 2 for the Show
- "Better Now", a song by Oh Wonder from the 2020 album No One Else Can Wear Your Crown
