= 2 for the Show =

Compilation album by MC Breed
- Released: November 23, 1999
- Recorded: 1998–1999
- Genre: Midwest hip hop, gangsta rap
- Length: 48:38
- Label: Power Records, Roadrunner Records
- Producer: MC Breed, Jazze Pha, Big L, 8Ball & MJG, Rob "Masta" Allen, South O, Mike Dean, Sedric "Swift" Barnett, B. Wild, Mr. Lee, Theo G, Colin Wolfe, Jermaine Tipton

MC Breed chronology
It's All Good (1999)	2 for the Show (1999)	The Thugz, Vol. 1 (2000)

Professional ratings
Review scores
Source	Rating
Allmusic	1.5/5 stars

2 for the Show is the tenth album released by MC Breed. It was released on November 23, 1999, for Power Records, distributed by Roadrunner Records and was produced by MC Breed, Jazze Pha, Big L, 8Ball & MJG, Rob "Masta" Allen, South O, Mike Dean, Sedric "Swift" Barnett, B. Wild, Mr. Lee, Theo G, Colin Wolfe and Jermaine Tipton. 2 for the Show was a concept album with all the songs being a duet between Breed and another rapper.

== Track listing ==
1. "Gotta Get Mine (Remix)"- 4:20 (Featuring 2Pac)
2. "Sesshead Funk Junky"- 4:29 (Featuring 8Ball & MJG)
3. "Mo' Money to Get"- 4:11 (Featuring Paycheck)
4. "2-2 da Chest"- 4:30 (Featuring DFC)
5. "Rebel Slave"- 4:26 (Featuring Southclick)
6. "Everyday Thang in da Hood"- 4:04 (Featuring Ghetto Mafia)
7. "No Future"- 4:25 (Featuring Bootleg)
8. "Better Now"- 3:59 (Featuring Big Mike)
9. "Conclusion"- 5:15 (Featuring Too Short)
10. "Think About It"- 4:43 (Featuring Hardboyz)
11. "Let's Go to da Club"- 4:16 (Featuring Erotic D)
