= 20 Below =

Studio album by MC Breed
- Released: May 12, 1992
- Studio: Silver Sun Recording Studio, Flint, Michigan
- Genre: Hip-hop
- Length: 54:34
- Label: Wrap Records; S.D.E.G. Records; Ichiban Records
- Producer: Bernard Terry; Flash Technology

MC Breed chronology
M.C. Breed & DFC. (1991)	20 Below (1992)	The New Breed (1993)

Singles from 20 Below
- 1. "I Ain't To Be Flexed With" Released: 1992; 2. "Ain't Too Much Worried" Released: 1992; 3. "No Frontin' Allowed" Released: 1992

Professional ratings
Review scores
Source	Rating
AllMusic	1.5/5 stars
RapReviews	6/10 stars

20 Below is the debut solo album by American hip hop recording artist MC Breed from Flint, Michigan. It was released on May 12, 1992, via Wrap Records and S.D.E.G. Records with distribution by Ichiban Records. Recording sessions took place at Silver Sun Recording Studio in Flint with producers DJ Flash and Bernard Terry. It features guest appearances from Chuck Nyce and Night & Day.

The album peaked at number 155 on the Billboard 200, at number 40 on the Top R&B/Hip-Hop Albums chart and at number 6 on the Heatseekers Albums chart in the United States. It spawned three singles: "Ain't to Be F...ed With", "Ain't Too Much Worried" and "No Frontin' Allowed". The first two singles from the album made it to the Hot Rap Songs chart – "Ain't to Be Fucked With" reached number 14, while "Ain't Too Much Worried" reached number 12.

== Track listing ==
No.	Title	Length
1.	"Ain't to Be Fucked With"	4:23
2.	"20 Below"	3:54
3.	"Dis Mode"	4:00
4.	"Little Child Runnin' Wild"	3:55
5.	"Flash's Groove"	4:26
6.	"Ain't Too Much Worried" (featuring Night & Day)	4:56
7.	"No Frontin' Allowed"	4:33
8.	"Be Myself" (featuring Chuck Nyce)	4:33
9.	"Great Depression"	3:31
10.	"Whenever You Want Me" (featuring Night & Day)	3:57
11.	"Life of a Flintstone"	3:44
12.	"Jealous Pimp"	3:21
13.	"Shout Out"	5:22
Total length:		54:34

== Personnel ==
- Eric Tyrone Breed – performer, arranger (tracks: 6, 10)
- Chuck Nyce – performer (track 8)
- Tonyatta Martinez – backing vocals (tracks: 6, 10)
- Gasner Hughes – backing vocals (tracks: 6, 10)
- Bernard Ricardo Terry – backing vocals (track 1), guitar (track 4), producer (tracks: 1–4, 6, 8, 10), co-producer (track 7), mixing, recording
- DJ Flash – producer (tracks: 1–5, 7, 9, 11–13), co-producer (tracks: 8, 10)
- Nimbus – mastering
- Peter Morada – art direction, design
- Andrew Wilson – photography

== Charts ==
=== Weekly charts ===
Chart (1992)	Peak position
US Billboard 200	155
US Top R&B/Hip-Hop Albums (Billboard)	40
US Heatseekers Albums (Billboard)	6

=== Year-end charts ===
Chart (1992)	Position
US Top R&B/Hip-Hop Albums (Billboard)	94
