= The Whole World's Rotten =

Studio album by DFC
- Released: November 25, 1997
- Recorded: 1997
- Studio: D.A.R.P. Studios (Atlanta, Georgia); Music Annex (Palo Alto, California)
- Genre: Gangsta rap
- Length: 52:59
- Label: Penalty; Big Beat
- Producer: Leroy McMath (exec.); Neil Levine (exec.); Jazze Pha; Blackjack; MC Breed; Erotic D.; G-Man Stan; MC Eiht; Colin Wolfe

DFC chronology
Things in tha Hood (1994)	The Whole World's Rotten (1997)	The Hits (2007)

Singles from The Whole World's Rotten
- 1. "Listen (Five Minutes) / Blaugh" Released: April 1997

Professional ratings
Review scores
Source	Rating
The Source	3/5 stars

The Whole World's Rotten is the third studio album by American rap duo DFC from Flint, Michigan. It was released on November 25, 1997 through Big Beat Records with distribution via Tommy Boy Records. Recording sessions took place at D.A.R.P. Studios in Atlanta and at Music Annex in Palo Alto. Production was handled by seven record producers: Jazze Pha, Gentry "Black Jack" Reed, MC Eiht of Compton's Most Wanted, Erotic D, "G-Man" Stan Keith, Colin Wolfe and the group's frequent collaborator MC Breed. It features guest appearances from MC Breed, MC Eiht, Jazze Pha, The D.O.C., Big Zack, Trauma Black and N.O.T.R.

The album did not match the success of their previous effort, only making it to 92 on the Billboard's Top R&B/Hip-Hop Albums. Its lead single, "Listen (Five Minutes)", which used a sample of Kool & the Gang's "Summer Madness", was a minor hit on the Hot R&B/Hip-Hop Songs and Hot Rap Songs charts, peaking at #85 and #18.

== Track listing ==
No.	Title	Producer(s)	Length
1.	"Rotten 1" (Skit)		1:30
2.	"The Whole World's Rotten" (featuring Big Zak & Sonji Mickey)	Jazze Pha	4:24
3.	"Caught in the Game"	Jazze Pha	4:58
4.	"Rotten 2" (Skit)		0:52
5.	"Ain't Nobody" (featuring MC Breed)	MC Breed	3:34
6.	"Rotten 3" (Skit)		1:11
7.	"Listen (Five Minutes)"	Erotic D	4:13
8.	"Wastin' Time" (featuring MC Breed)	Blackjack; G-Man Stan	5:00
9.	"Rotten 4" (Skit)		0:40
10.	"Blaugh" (featuring MC Breed & Trauma Black)	Jazze Pha	4:35
11.	"Smokin'" (featuring Trauma Black & Jazze Pha)	Jazze Pha	3:57
12.	"G Shit" (featuring MC Eiht & N.O.T.R.)	MC Eiht	5:39
13.	"Stack Them Bodies" (featuring The D.O.C. & Boo Boo Breed)	Colin Wolfe	3:38
14.	"These Flint Streets" (featuring MC Breed, Jibri, Boo Boo Breed & Swift C)	Blackjack	4:28
15.	"Nobody Trust in I" (CD bonus track)		4:20
Total length:			52:59

== Charts ==
Chart (1998)	Peak position
US Top R&B/Hip-Hop Albums (Billboard)	92
