= The Best of Breed =

Greatest hits album by MC Breed
- Released: October 3, 1995
- Recorded: 1991–1995
- Genre: Midwest hip hop, G-funk, hardcore hip hop
- Length: 61:30
- Label: Wrap Records
- Producer: MC Breed, The D.O.C., Herman Lang, Salomon Harris

MC Breed chronology
Big Baller (1995)	The Best of Breed (1995)	To Da Beat Ch'all (1996)

Professional ratings
Review scores
Source	Rating
Allmusic	link

The Best of Breed is a compilation album released by MC Breed. It peaked at number 66 on Billboard magazine's Top R&B/Hip-Hop Albums chart in the U.S.

== Track listing ==
1. "Ain't No Future in Yo' Frontin'"- 4:00
2. "Gotta Get Mine"- 4:17
3. "Everyday Ho"- 3:49
4. "Well Alright"- 5:08
5. "Seven Years"- 4:06
6. "Late Nite Creep (Booty Call)"- 4:56
7. "Aquapussy"- 4:10
8. "Tight"- 5:06
9. "Ain't Too Much Worried"- 5:24
10. "Just Kickin' It"- 3:54
11. "Game for Life"- 3:14
12. "Real MC"- 4:02
13. "Teach My Kids"- 4:17
14. "This Is How We Do It"- 5:07
