= The Hurra =

Studio album by DJ Hurricane
- Released: 1995
- Genre: Hip hop
- Labels: Grand Royal/Capitol; Wiiija
- Producers: DJ Hurricane, Mario Caldato

DJ Hurricane chronology
The Hurra (1995)	Severe Tire Damage (1997)

The Hurra is the debut solo album by the American rapper and producer DJ Hurricane. It was released in 1995 via Grand Royal.

DJ Hurricane supported the album by opening—and DJing—for the Beastie Boys on their 1995 tour.

== Production ==
Mario Caldato helped to produce the album; the Beastie Boys supplied some of the instrumentation. Sen Dog, the Beastie Boys, and MC Breed contributed guest verses.

== Critical reception ==
Professional ratings
Review scores
Source	Rating
AllMusic	2/5 stars
The Encyclopedia of Popular Music	4/5 stars
Entertainment Weekly	B
The Indianapolis Star	2.5/4 stars

SF Weekly wrote that "Hurricane's tongue-twisting is reminiscent of vintage Run-D.M.C., a solid, no-gimmicks mixture of bold braggadocio and good-time party rhymes, but his music is straight, newfangled boom bap." CMJ New Music Monthly concluded that some songs "takes Paul's Boutique blaxploitation funk and hardens it into a '90s rumble." The Indianapolis Star stated that "the stereotypical [thug] banter detracts from an otherwise smart-sounding debut."

Entertainment Weekly thought that the "rhymes are strictly meat-and-potatoes, but the back tracks—funky and flavorful—are a smorgasbord of homemade recipes." Trouser Press opined that "Hurricane’s sinewy delivery and low-rider funk backing tracks make songs like 'Elbow Room' and 'Four Fly Guys' perfect for late-night beer-swilling." Rolling Stone determined that the "combination of humor, finesse and musicality serves Hurricane throughout, integrating his dual roles on The Hurra into one smart, cohesive listen."

== Track listing ==
No.	Title	Producer(s)	Length
1.	"Now You Do"	DJ Hurricane; Mario Caldato Jr.	3:23
2.	"Elbow Room"	DJ Hurricane; Mario Caldato Jr.	3:10
3.	"Four Fly Guys" (featuring Beastie Boys)	DJ Hurricane; Mario Caldato Jr.	3:34
4.	"Can We All Get Along"	DJ Hurricane; Mario Caldato Jr.	3:29
5.	"Feel the Blast" (featuring Sen Dog)	Erik Blank; Eric Bobo; Mario Caldato Jr. (co.)	3:38
6.	"Pass Me the Gun"	DJ Hurricane; Mario Caldato Jr.	3:44
7.	"The Hurra"	DJ Hurricane; Mario Caldato Jr.	1:03
8.	"Where's My Niggas At"	DJ Hurricane; Mario Caldato Jr.	3:32
9.	"What's Really Going On" (featuring L.O. & MC Breed)	DJ Hurricane; Mario Caldato Jr.	3:31
10.	"Comin' Off" (featuring L.O. & Tye Bud)	DJ Hurricane; Mario Caldato Jr.	3:16
11.	"Get Blind"	DJ Hurricane	2:56
12.	"Pat Your Foot"	DJ Hurricane; Mario Caldato Jr.	3:26
13.	"Stick 'Em Up" (featuring Beastie Boys)	Beastie Boys; DJ Hurricane; Mario Caldato Jr.	2:50
Total length:			41:32

Samples

- "Elbow Room" sampled "Guerillas in tha Mist" by Da Lench Mob (1992)
- "Feel the Blast" sampled "Run, Nigger" by the Last Poets (1970) and "Ya Slippin'" by Boogie Down Productions (1988)
- "Pass Me the Gun" sampled "Doggone" by Love (1969)
- "Where's My Niggas At?" sampled "Tasha" by Odell Brown (1974)
- "What's Really Going On" sampled "Black Bag" by Carl Holmes (1974)
- "Comin' Off" sampled "Hihache" by Lafayette Afro Rock Band (1973)
- "Get Blind" sampled "I Can't See You" by Marvin Holmes and Justice (1973), "Safari" by Eddy Senay (1972) and "A Child's Garden of Grass (Part 3)" by Jack Margolis (1971)
- "Stick 'Em Up" sampled "Put the Funk on You" by Fatback Band (1975)

== Personnel ==
- Eric Bobo – percussion
- Mario Caldato Jr. – bass, upright bass, guitar
- Mark Nishita – piano, flute
- Tom Baker – mastering

Notes

- Sequenced at Bundy's
- Mastered at Future Disk
