= Gotta Get Mine =

1993 single by MC Breed

Single by MC Breed featuring 2Pac

from the album The New Breed
- B-side: "Watch Your Own Back"
- Released: June 3, 1993
- Studio: Track Recordings (Los Angeles, California)
- Genre: Hip-hop
- Length: 4:22 (album version)
- Label: Wrap Records; Ichiban
- Composers: Colin Wolfe; Warren Griffin III
- Lyricists: Eric Tyrone Breed; Tupac Shakur; Tracy Lynn Curry
- Producers: Warren G; Colin Wolfe; MC Breed

MC Breed singles chronology
"No Frontin' Allowed" (1992)	"Gotta Get Mine" (1993)	"Tight" (1993)

2Pac singles chronology
"Holler If Ya Hear Me" (1993)	"'Gotta Get Mine'" (1993)	"I Get Around" (1993)

Music video
- "Gotta Get Mine" on YouTube

"Gotta Get Mine" is a song performed by American rappers MC Breed and 2Pac. It was released on June 3, 1993, through Wrap Records with distribution via Ichiban Records, as a lead single from MC Breed's second solo studio album The New Breed. Its lyrics were written by Breed, 2Pac and The D.O.C., and the music was composed by Colin Wolfe and Warren G. It was produced by Warren G, Colin Wolfe and MC Breed.

The single peaked at number 96 on the Billboard Hot 100, at number 61 on the Hot R&B/Hip-Hop Songs and at number 6 on the Hot Rap Songs in the United States, making it the second MC Breed's successful single after 1991 "Ain't No Future in Yo' Frontin'".

The song was later included in MC Breed's 1995 greatest hits album The Best of Breed, and was featured in the soundtrack to the 1998 film Ringmaster and in the 2002 film 8 Mile. It was also remixed for MC Breed's seventh studio album It's All Good.

== Track listing ==
12" vinyl single
No.	Title	Lyrics	Music	Producer(s)	Length
1.	"Gotta Get Mine" (Radio/Video Remix)	E. Breed; T. Shakur; T. Curry	C. Wolfe; W. Griffin III	Warren G; Colin Wolfe; MC Breed	4:25
2.	"Gotta Get Mine" (Album Version)	E. Breed; T. Shakur; T. Curry	C. Wolfe; W. Griffin III	Warren G; Colin Wolfe; MC Breed	4:22
3.	"Watch Your Own Back" (featuring Admiral D, Jibri & Black Caesar)	E. Breed; D. Jabrigar; Admiral D; Black Caesar	C. Wolfe; W. Griffin III	Warren G; Colin Wolfe; MC Breed	3:42

== Personnel ==
- Eric Tyrone Breed – lyrics, vocals, producer
- Tupac Amaru Shakur – lyrics & vocals (tracks: 1, 2)
- Admiral D – lyrics & vocals (track 3)
- Dale "Jibri" Jabrigar – lyrics & vocals (track 3)
- Black Caesar – lyrics & vocals (track 3)
- Colin Fitzroy Wolfe – music, producer
- Warren Griffin III – music, producer
- Tracy Lynn Curry – lyrics (tracks: 1, 2)
- Jimmy O'Neill – mixing (track 1)
- Earl – engineering
- FPD3 – art direction, design

== Charts ==
Chart (1993)	Peak position
US Billboard Hot 100	96
US Hot R&B/Hip-Hop Songs (Billboard)	61
US Hot Rap Songs (Billboard)	6
