= Big Baller =

Big Baller may refer to:

- Big Baller Brand, a sports apparel company
  - LaVar Ball, the founder of said company, who goes by that nickname
- Big Baller (album), a 1995 hip-hop album by MC Breed
