= Lovers Lane =

Lovers' lane is a generic term for a secluded area where people go (on foot or by car) to kiss or make out.

Lovers Lane may also refer to:

- "Lovers Lane", a poem by Eugene Field, about the Street in St. Joseph, Missouri
- Lovers' Lane, a 1901 play by Clyde Fitch
- Lovers' Lane (1924 film), an American silent romantic comedy film based on the play
- Lovers Lane (1999 film), a slasher film
- Lovers Lane (2005 film), a pornographic film
- "Lovers' Lane" (Roseanne), a first-season episode of the TV show Roseanne
- "Lover's Lane", a first-season episode of Cold Case
- Lovers Lane station, a light rail station in Dallas, Texas
- Lovers Lane (album), 1992 debut album of M. C. Brains
- "Ishq Di Galli Vich" (lit. 'In Lovers Lane'), a song by Anu Malik, Alisha Chinai and Sonu Nigam from the 2005 Indian film No Entry
