= Top Authority Uncut (The New Yea) =

1997 hip hop album by Top Authority

Studio album by Top Authority
- Released: October 21, 1997
- Studio: Silver Sun Studio (Flint, Michigan); Pierrenandos (Flint, Michigan); Sandcastle (Gary, Indiana)
- Genre: Gangsta rap; g-funk
- Label: Wrap Records; Top Flight Records
- Producer: Atty Tom Lewis (exec.); Johné Battle (exec.); Top Authority (also exec.); Gee Pierce; Rodney Jones; Lavel Jackson; Pierre Copeland; Paxton Miller; Reggie Mayes; "Skeet" Jones

Top Authority chronology
Rated G (1995)	Top Authority Uncut (The New Yea) (1997)	Kush Music (2009)

Singles from Top Authority Uncut (The New Yea)
- 1. "Playaz / Dope Game" Released: 1997; 2. "World War III" Released: 1998

Professional ratings
Review scores
Source	Rating
AllMusic	4.5/5 stars

Top Authority Uncut (The New Yea) is the third studio album by American hip hop group Top Authority from Flint, Michigan. It was released on October 21, 1997, through Top Flight Records and Wrap Records with distribution by Ichiban Records. Recording sessions took place at Silver Sun Recording Studio and Pierrenandos in Flint, Michigan, and at Sandcastle in Gary, Indiana. It featured guest appearances from Big Whup, Tuck, Yusef Boswell and Madame Dane. The album peaked at #192 on the Billboard 200 albums chart and at #21 on the Top R&B/Hip-Hop Albums chart in the United States. It spawned two singles: "Playaz"/"Dope Game" and "World War III" (the latter peaked at #37 on the Billboard Hot Rap Songs chart). AllMusic gave the album 4.5 of 5 stars.

== Track listing ==
No.	Title	Producer(s)	Length
1.	"Buck Em Down"	Gee Pierce	4:12
2.	"Interlude"	Gee Pierce	0:49
3.	"Dope Game" (featuring Yusef Boswell)	"Skeet" Jones; Pierre Copeland (co.)	3:59
4.	"World War III" (featuring Madame Dane)	Gee Pierce	4:35
5.	"Ghetto is the Trigger"	Pierre Copeland	4:15
6.	"Strange" (featuring Tuck)	Gee Pierce	3:46
7.	"Lifestyle of a "G""	Lavel Jackson; Gee Pierce (co.)	5:08
8.	"Never Know When"	Lavel Jackson	4:51
9.	"Dreamin'"	Paxton Miller	1:32
10.	"Playaz" (featuring Big Whup)	Rodney "Villain" Jones	4:38
11.	"Trying So Hard"	Rodney "Villain" Jones	5:02
12.	"Haters"	Rodney "Villain" Jones; Reggie Mayes	4:35
Total length:			≈47:00

== Personnel ==
- Top Authority – vocals, executive producers
- Yusef Boswell – vocals (track 3)
- Madame Dane – vocals (track 4)
- Tuck – vocals (track 6)
- Big Whupp – vocals (track 10)
- Gee Pierce – producer (tracks: 1, 2, 4, 6), co-producer (track 7)
- "Skeet" Jones – producer (track 3)
- Pierre Copeland – producer (track 5), co-producer (track 3), recording (tracks: 3, 5)
- Lavel Jackson – producer (tracks: 7, 8)
- Paxton Miller – producer (track 9)
- Rodney "Villain" Jones – producer (tracks: 10–12)
- Reggie Mayes – producer (track 12)
- Michael Jerome Powell – mixing (tracks: 1–11)
- Bernard Terry – mixing (track 12), engineering
- Bob Ware – recording (track 3)
- Johné Battle – executive producer, art direction, design
- Atty Tom Lewis – executive producer
- Shonda Jessie – coordinator
- Pen & Pixel – art direction, artwork, design, photography

== Chart history ==
Chart (1997)	Peak position
US Billboard 200	192
US Top R&B/Hip-Hop Albums (Billboard)	21
