= It's All Good (MC Breed album) =

Studio album by MC Breed
- Released: February 9, 1999
- Recorded: 1998
- Genre: Gangsta rap
- Length: 48:17
- Label: Power Records
- Producer: Jazze Pha; MC Breed; Colin Wolfe; Erotic D.; Mr. Ku

MC Breed chronology
Flatline (1997)	It's All Good (1999)	The Fharmacist (2001)

Professional ratings
Review scores
Source	Rating
AllMusic	2/5 stars
RapReviews	8/10

It's All Good is the seventh solo studio album by the Flint, Michigan-based hip hop recording artist and producer MC Breed. It was released on February 9, 1999, via Power Records with distribution by Roadrunner Records/RED Distribution. Production was handled by MC Breed, Colin Wolfe, Jazze Pha, Erotic D and Mr. Ku. It features guest appearances from 2Pac, DFC, Too $hort, Pimp C, Mr. Ku, Kurupt and Jazze Pha. After seven years with Wrap Records, this MC Breed's first album with Power Records. Breed returned to the Billboard 200 with this album, as the album peaked at No. 180 on the chart as well as placing at No. 41 on the Top R&B/Hip-Hop Albums chart.

== Track listing ==
No.	Title	Producer(s)	Length
1.	"Intro"	MC Breed	1:23
2.	"Gotta Get Mine (Remix)" (featuring 2Pac)	MC Breed; Colin Wolfe	4:21
3.	"Gangsta Shit"	Colin Wolfe	5:06
4.	"Tricks" (featuring Too $hort)	Jazze Pha	3:15
5.	"It's All Good" (featuring Jazze Pha)	Jazze Pha	4:24
6.	"She Likes It" (Skit)	MC Breed	0:45
7.	"Work It from the Bottom"	Jazze Pha	4:11
8.	"Let's Go to Da Club"	Erotic D.	4:16
9.	"Business Never Personal"	Colin Wolfe	4:09
10.	"Rule No. 1" (featuring Pimp C, DFC & Kurupt)	Jazze Pha	3:41
11.	"Smoke Wit a Nigga" (featuring Mr. Ku)	Mr. Ku	4:27
12.	"Boom Boom"	Erotic D.	4:02
Total length:			48:17

== Charts ==
Chart (1999)	Peak position
US Billboard 200	180
US Top R&B/Hip-Hop Albums (Billboard)	41
