= Full Blooded Niggaz =

Album by Ghetto Mafia

Studio album by Ghetto Mafia
- Released: October 10, 1995
- Recorded: 1995
- Genre: Gangsta rap, Southern hip hop
- Length: 40:08
- Label: Triad
- Producer: POR Productions

Ghetto Mafia chronology
Draw the Line (1994)	Full Blooded Niggaz (1995)	Straight from the Dec (1997)

Full Blooded Niggaz is the second album by the Ghetto Mafia. It was released on October 10, 1995 through Triad Records and was produced by POR Productions, a three-man production team consisting of Carl Dorsey, Edgar Hinton and Lance McLendon who also wrote most of the songs on the album. Full Blooded Niggaz peaked at 65 on the Billboard's Top R&B/Hip-Hop Albums.

== Track listing ==
1. "The Chair"- 3:46
2. "Snap Shot"- 3:29
3. "I Ain't Going Down"- 3:44
4. "Clean Getaway"- 3:41
5. "Organized Crime"- 3:21
6. "What Dem Gon Do"- 4:46
7. "This Is a Stick Up"- 4:00
8. "All Out"- 4:21
9. "Real Motha Fuckas- 4:27
10. "Creepin"- 4:33

== Chart history ==
Chart (1995)	Peak position
Billboard Top R&B Albums	65
