= MC Breed & DFC =

M.C. Breed & DFC.

Studio album by MC Breed and DFC
- Released: August 13, 1991
- Genre: Midwest hip hop
- Length: 39:54
- Label: S.D.E.G.; Ichiban
- Producer: MC Breed; Herman Lang; S. Harris

MC Breed chronology
M.C. Breed & DFC. (1991)	20 Below (1992)

DFC chronology
M.C. Breed & DFC. (1991)	Things in tha Hood (1994)

Singles from M.C. Breed & DFC.
- 1. "Ain't No Future in Yo' Frontin'" Released: 1991; 2. "Just Kickin' It" Released: 1992

M.C. Breed & DFC. is the collaborative studio album by American musician MC Breed and hip hop duo DFC, from Flint, Michigan. It was released on August 13, 1991, through S.D.E.G. Records, with distribution via Ichiban Records. The album was produced by MC Breed, Herman Lang, and S. Harris. It peaked at No. 142 on the Billboard 200, No. 38 on the Top R&B/Hip-Hop Albums and No. 3 on the Top Heatseekers.

The album spawned two charting singles, "Ain't No Future in Yo' Frontin'", which made it to No. 66 on the Billboard Hot 100 and No. 12 on the Hot Rap Singles, and "Just Kickin' It", which made it to No. 10 on the Hot Rap Singles.

== Critical reception ==
Professional ratings
Review scores
Source	Rating
AllMusic	3/5 stars
RapReviews	7.5/10

The Washington Post stated: "From the cover art to the drum machine and booming bass sound, this Flint, Mich., group's album can be summed up in two words: 'Low budget'."

== Track listing ==
No.	Title	Length
1.	"Underground Slang"	2:47
2.	"Job Corp"	3:22
3.	"That's Life"	4:45
4.	"Ain't No Future in Yo' Frontin'"	4:04
5.	"Just Kickin' It"	3:53
6.	"Better Terms"	3:17
7.	"I Will Excell"	3:35
8.	"Get Loose"	2:09
9.	"Black for Black"	2:42
10.	"Guanja"	6:23
11.	"More Power"	3:20
Total length:		39:54

== Sample credits ==
Job Corp

- "Superman Lover" by Johnny "Guitar" Watson

That's Life

- "Blind Man Can See It" by James Brown

Ain't No Future in Yo' Frontin'

- "Funky Worm" by Ohio Players
- "More Bounce to the Ounce" by Zapp

Better Terms

- "The Grunt" by the J.B.'s
- "Funky Drummer" by James Brown

Just Kickin' It

- "If You Let Me" by Eddie Kendricks

== Personnel ==
- Eric Breed – performer, producer, mixing, assistant engineering
- Alpha "Al" Breed – performer
- Bobby T. "T-Dub" Thompson – performer
- Herman Lang, Jr. – producer
- Schzelle Salomon Harris – producer (track 4)
- Leroy McMath – executive producer, mixing, assistant engineering, management
- Tim Brown – executive producer
- Bernard Terry – mixing, engineering
- Robert Dawkins – mixing, engineering
- Yvonne Williams – coordinator
- Nina K. Easton – art direction & design

== Charts ==
=== Weekly charts ===
Chart (1991)	Peak position
US Billboard 200	142
US Top R&B/Hip-Hop Albums (Billboard)	38
US Heatseekers Albums (Billboard)	3

=== Year-end charts ===
Chart (1991)	Position
US Top R&B/Hip-Hop Albums (Billboard)	82
