= Rare Breed (album) =

Compilation album by MC Breed
- Released: February 8, 2000
- Recorded: 1999
- Genre: Hip hop
- Length: 64:16
- Label: Albatross Records
- Producer: MC Breed, Jazze Pha, Chuck Nyce

MC Breed chronology
The Thugz, Vol. 1 (2000)	Rare Breed (2000)	The Fharmacist (2001)

Professional ratings
Review scores
Source	Rating
Allmusic	1.5/5 stars

Rare Breed is a compilation album presented by American rapper, MC Breed. It was released February 8, 2000 for Albatross Records and was produced by MC Breed, Jazze Pha and Chuck Nyce.

== Track listing ==
1. "Roll Up a Phat One" – 4:18
2. "The Bomb" – 5:41
3. "Playa Hatta" – 4:59
4. "I Don't Give a Fuck" – 1:08
5. "SWATS" – 4:21
6. "What's It Gonna Be" – 4:37
7. "Make Me Wanna" – 3:34
8. "On a Mission" – 4:35
9. "Ashes to Ashes" – 4:44
10. "Put It Down" – 1:14
11. "Money Make the World" – 4:14
12. "First U Fuck Me" – 4:14
13. "The World" – 5:36
14. "It's a Must" – 6:21
15. "Phat Phunk" – 4:40
