= Oochie Coochie =

Single by M.C. Brains

from the album Lovers Lane
- Released: December 3, 1991
- Recorded: 1991
- Genre: Hip hop
- Length: 3:41
- Label: Motown
- Songwriter(s): James Davis, Rico Anderson, Michael Bivins, Kevin Wales
- Producer(s): Rico Anderson

M.C. Brains singles chronology
"Oochie Coochie" (1991)	"Brainstorming" (1992)

"Oochie Coochie" is the lead single released from M.C. Brains' debut album, Lovers Lane. It was produced by Rico Anderson, with Michael Bivins (of New Edition and Bell Biv DeVoe) serving as an executive producer.

The song became a crossover hit, peaking at number 21 on the Billboard Hot 100 while also topping the Hot Rap Singles at number one. The single also achieved a gold certification from the RIAA for sales of 500,000 copies.

== Single track listing ==
=== A-Side ===
1. "Oochie Coochie" (12" Mix) – 6:49
2. "Oochie Coochie" (X-Rated Version) – 3:25

=== B-Side ===
1. "Oochie Coochie" (7" Mix) – 3:41
2. "Oochie Coochie" (Instrumental) – 3:41

== Chart history ==
Chart (1992)	Peak position
Billboard Hot 100	21
Billboard Hot R&B Singles	16
Billboard Hot Rap Singles	1
Billboard Hot Dance Music/Maxi-Singles Sales	26
