= Artie "Blues Boy" White =

American blues and soul singer and guitarist

Artie "Blues Boy" White (April 16, 1937 – April 20, 2013) was an American blues and soul singer and guitarist based in Chicago, who was described as "one of the foremost Chicago practitioners of Southern Soul music".

== Life and career ==
Born in Vicksburg, Mississippi, he first began performing in his teens with a gospel group, the Harps of David, before moving to Chicago in 1956. He continued to sing gospel in the Full Gospel Wonders, but switched to perform blues music in Chicago clubs in the early 1960s. After releasing several singles on small labels, he had his only chart hit in 1977 with "(You Are My) Leanin' Tree", written by Chicago songwriter Bob Jones and released on the ALTee label, which reached number 99 on the Billboard R&B chart.

For a while he ran a blues club, Bootsy's Show Lounge, and later another venue, the New Club Bootsy’s. He continued to perform and record, releasing the album Blues Boy on the Ronn label in 1985 and thereafter adopting the title as his sobriquet. In 1987, he moved to the Ichiban label, where he recorded seven albums of soul blues, including more of Bob Jones' songs and, on the 1989 album Thangs Got to Change, a collaboration with his musical inspiration, Little Milton Campbell. He signed for the Waldoxy label, a subsidiary of Malaco Records, in 1994, and released the album Different Shades of Blue, which was nominated for the Jackson Blues Award. His most popular singles in the 1990s included “I’m Gonna Marry My Mother-In-Law” (1994) and “Your Man Is Home Tonight” (1997). In 1997 he released the album Back Home to Clarksdale: A Tribute to Muddy Waters, followed by Can We Get Together (1999).

He became well known on the Chicago blues scene for his flamboyant costumes and stage presence, toured internationally, and headlined the 2000 Chicago Blues Festival. In 2001 he released the album Can’t Get Enough on his own AChillTown label. He became ill later in the decade, developing multiple health issues and increasingly using a wheelchair, but returned to occasional performances such as a concert to honor Buddy Guy in 2008.

White died from Parkinson's disease in 2013, shortly after his 76th birthday.

== Legacy ==
After his death, the Artie “Blues Boy” White Youth Scholarship Foundation was set up in Illinois. Its expressed purpose is "to mentor and support youth, up to age 21 years, who are in pursuit of a career in music."

== Discography ==
=== Albums ===
- Blues Boy (Ronn, 1985)
- Nothing Takes the Place of You (1987, Ichiban)
- Where It's At (1988, Ichiban)
- Thangs Got to Change (1989, Ichiban)
- Tired of Sneaking Around (1990, Ichiban)
- Dark End of the Street (1991, Ichiban )
- Hit & Run (1992, Ichiban)
- Different Shades of Blue (1994, Waldoxy)
- Back Home to Clarksdale: A Tribute to Muddy Waters (1997, Waldoxy)
- Home Tonight (1997, Waldoxy)
- Can We Get Together (1999, Waldoxy)
- Can't Get Enough (2002, AChillTown)
- American Roots: Blues (2002, P & S)
- First Thing Tuesday Morning (2004, Blues Boy)
- Package Deal (2006, AChillTown)
