= The Thugz, Vol. 1 =

Compilation album by MC Breed
- Released: January 18, 2000
- Recorded: 1999
- Genre: Midwest hip hop, gangsta rap, Southern hip hop
- Label: Power Records
- Producer: MC Breed, Corey Peterson, LeRoy McMath, Bob Antoine

MC Breed chronology
2 for the Show (1999)	The Thugz, Vol. 1 (2000)	Rare Breed (2000)

Professional ratings
Review scores
Source	Rating
AllMusic	1.5/5 stars

The Thugz, Vol. 1 is a compilation album presented by American rapper, MC Breed. It was released January 18, 2000 for Power Records and was produced by MC Breed, Corey Peterson, LeRoy McMath and Bob Antoine. The album peaked at No. 64 on the Billboard Top R&B/Hip-Hop Albums chart.

== Track listing ==
1. "Thug Promise"- :46
2. "Try Me Dog"- 4:25
3. "Bitches"- 3:26 (featuring Too Short, Richie Rich)
4. "Westside Thang"- 3:35
5. "Babysittin'"- 3:47
6. "Skanless"- 5:12
7. "Mo' Money to Get"- 4:11
8. "Mack the Jack'a"- 4:27
9. "Provider"- 3:52
10. "Gangsta Gangsta"- 4:20
11. "No Future"- 4:17 (featuring Bootleg)
12. "Slackin on Yo Pimpin"- 4:34
13. "Jack'n"- 6:29
