= The New Prescription =

Studio album by Breed
- Released: August 24, 2004
- Recorded: 2002–2004
- Genre: Hip-hop
- Label: UMZ, Psychopathic Records
- Producer: Esham, G. Pierce, Ess Man, Lavel

Breed chronology
Chopped and Screwed (2002)	The New Prescription (2004)	The Mix Tape (2004)

The New Prescription is the ninth and final album by Breed. Released in 2004, it was Breed's only project through UMZ Entertainment, a subsidiary of Psychopathic Records.

== Conception ==
=== Background ===
Breed signed to UMZ Entertainment after leaving Fharmacy Recordings. UMZ was founded by Alex Abbiss as a subsidiary of Psychopathic Records, a label founded by Abbiss and Insane Clown Posse. Abbiss wanted to release music intended for a wider audience than ICP's Juggalo fanbase. Regarding Breed, ICP member and label chairman Joseph Bruce stated, "It’s just a business relationship that turned friends. We’re not doing anything with him in the future that we know of as far as tours or anything like that. He’s just doing his thing. His record is a great record."

=== Recording ===
Breed recorded The New Prescription with production by Psychopathic artist Esham, Psychopathic-affiliated rapper Lavel, and non-affiliated producers Ess Man and G. Piece. The album's songs were engineered, mixed, and arranged by Psychopathic producers Fritz "the Cat" Van Kosky, J. Hicks and Esham. "Gotta Go" featured vocals by singer Tobi, while "Roll" featured a guest rap verse by Esham.

== Release ==
"Rap Game" was released as a promo single, and a music video was produced, featuring an appearance by Tech N9ne in the video.

== Track listing ==
No.	Title	Producer(s)	Length
1.	"Intro"	Esham and Lavel	0:40
2.	"Breed (Let Me Hear Ya Say!)"	G. Pierce	3:40
3.	"Roll Wit Me (Niggaz & Bitches)"	Ess Man	3:25
4.	"Rap Game"	Ess Man	2:59
5.	"One Two"	Ess Man	2:58
6.	"Outta My Mind"	G. Pierce	3:33
7.	"Truth"	Ess Man	3:32
8.	"For the People"	G. Pierce	3:45
9.	"4 Cheese"	G. Pierce	4:10
10.	"Popcorn Popper"	Ess Man	3:20
11.	"I'm 2 Dope"	Ess Man	3:40
12.	"Gotta Go" (featuring Tobi)	G. Pierce	5:00
13.	"Frontin"	G. Pierce	3:26
14.	"Roll" (featuring Esham)	Ess Man	3:55
15.	"Outro"		0:26
Total length:			48:24

== Personnel ==
- Breed – vocals, lyrics
- Tobi – guest vocals, lyrics
- Esham – guest vocals, production, mixing, engineering, arrangement
- Lavel – skit vocals, production
- G. Pierce – production
- Ess Man – production
- Fritz "the Cat" Van Kosky – engineering, mixing, arrangement
- J. Hicks – engineering, mixing, arrangement
