= Things in tha Hood =

Studio album by DFC
- Released: March 22, 1994
- Genre: Gangsta rap
- Length: 50:53
- Label: Assault Records; Big Beat Records
- Producer: Cedric "Swift C" Barnett; DJ Slip; Warren G; MC Breed; MC Eiht; The D.O.C.

DFC chronology
MC Breed & DFC (1991)	Things in tha Hood (1994)	The Whole World's Rotten (1997)

Singles from Things in tha Hood
- 1. "Caps Get Peeled" Released: January 6, 1994; 2. "Things In Tha Hood" Released: November 8, 1994

Things in tha Hood is the second studio album by American rap duo DFC from Flint, Michigan. It was released on March 22, 1994 through the Atlantic Records subsidiary Big Beat Records. Production was handled by six record producers: DJ Slip and MC Eiht of Compton's Most Wanted, Warren G, The D.O.C., Cedric "Swift C" Barnett and the group's frequent collaborator MC Breed. It features guest appearances from MC Breed, MC Eiht, Warren G, Nate Dogg and Bushwick Bill. The album spawned two singles: "Caps Get Peeled" and "Things in tha Hood".

== Background ==
DFC's previous album was a collaborative effort with MC Breed, but Things in tha Hood became a bigger success then any of DFC or MC Breed's albums, peaking at number 71 on the Billboard 200 and at number 7 on the Top R&B/Hip-Hop Albums. In addition to the album, both of its singles also reached the Billboard charts, made it to Hot R&B/Hip-Hop Songs and Hot Rap Songs charts.

== Reception ==
Professional ratings
Review scores
Source	Rating
AllMusic	3/5 stars

Alex Henderson of AllMusic gave the album a solid three out of a possible five stars, stating "while DFC's lyrics are hardly innovative or groundbreaking by 1994 standards, the beats ultimately prove to be the saving grace of this enjoyable, if derivative, CD".

== Track listing ==
No.	Title	Producer(s)	Length
1.	"A Piece of My Mind (Intro)" (featuring Bushwick Bill)	DJ Slip	2:07
2.	"Put Your Locs On" (featuring MC Breed)	MC Breed	3:43
3.	"Caps Get Peeled" (featuring MC Eiht)	DJ Slip; MC Eiht	4:06
4.	"Mo' Love" (featuring MC Eiht)	Cedric "Swift C" Barnett	3:43
5.	"Things in Tha Hood" (featuring MC Breed and Nate Dogg)	Warren G	3:49
6.	"Pass the Hooter" (featuring Warren G)	Warren G	3:37
7.	"2-2 the Chest" (featuring MC Breed)	Cedric "Swift C" Barnett	4:38
8.	"Death B-4 Dishonesty" (featuring MC Breed)	Cedric "Swift C" Barnett	4:08
9.	"Hand's on My Nine" (featuring Boo Boo Breed)	Warren G	4:11
10.	"Roll With the Clan"	Cedric "Swift C" Barnett	4:18
11.	"Digga Bigga Ditch"	The D.O.C.	4:32
12.	"You Can Get the Dick" (featuring MC Breed)	DJ Slip	3:58
13.	"Da Bomb"	Cedric "Swift C" Barnett	4:03
Total length:			50:53

== Charts ==
=== Weekly charts ===
Chart (1994)	Peak position
US Billboard 200	71
US Top R&B/Hip-Hop Albums (Billboard)	7

=== Year-end charts ===
Chart (1994)	Position
US Top R&B/Hip-Hop Albums (Billboard)	72
