= American Son (2008 film) =

2008 film by Neil Abramson

- Theatrical release poster
- Directed by: Neil Abramson
- Written by: Eric Schmid
- Starring: Nick Cannon; Melonie Diaz; Matt O'Leary; Chi McBride; Jay Hernandez; Tom Sizemore
- Production companies: Map Point Pictures; Night & Day Pictures; Winghead Films
- Distributed by: Miramax Films
- Release date: January 19, 2008 (Sundance)
- Running time: 85 minutes
- Country: United States
- Language: English

American Son is a 2008 American independent drama film directed by Neil Abramson. The film stars Nick Cannon, Melonie Diaz, Matt O'Leary, Chi McBride, Jay Hernandez, and Tom Sizemore. Its plot follows a young man as he returns home to Bakersfield, California for Thanksgiving leave. Mike faces telling his friends and family of his nearby deployment to Iraq while dealing with a troublesome home life.

American Son competed in the Dramatic Competition at the 2008 Sundance Film Festival.

== Plot ==
A 19-year-old who has enlisted to go to Iraq falls in love with a girl, but is afraid that he might not come back alive.

A young Marine named Mike (Nick Cannon) is shipping out for uncertain fortunes in Iraq, and has 4 days left to visit back home in Bakersfield California. The story is about his parting relationships with his best friend Jake (Matt O'Leary), a new girlfriend Christina (Melonie Diaz), his mother Donna (April Grace), and father Eddie (Chi McBride) over these 96 hours. None of these people initially knows he's shipping out, and each of the significant other's reactions to this news, one-on-one with Mike, make up the bulk of the story. The story also gives some insight into Mike's motives as to why he enlisted in the first place.
