= Straight from the Dec =

Studio album by Ghetto Mafia
- Released: March 11, 1997
- Recorded: 1996–1997
- Genres: Gangsta rap, Southern hip hop
- Label: Fully Loaded
- Producer: Ghetto Mafia

Ghetto Mafia chronology
Full Blooded Niggaz (1995)	Straight from the Dec (1997)	On da Grind (1998)

Professional ratings
Review scores
Source	Rating
allmusic	3/5 stars

Straight from the Dec is the third studio album by the Ghetto Mafia. It was released on March 11, 1997 through Fully Loaded Records and was produced by the Ghetto Mafia themselves. Straight from the Dec found more success than the group's previous two albums, having peaked at 49 on the Top R&B/Hip-Hop Albums and 17 on the Top Heatseekers. The album also spawned the Ghetto Mafia's first charting single "I Can Feel It" which made it to both the R&B and rap charts.

== Track listing ==
1. "In da Paint"
2. "Fool I Got Ya"
3. "For The Good Times (Straight From The Dec)"
4. "Don't Turn Back"
5. "Uncut"
6. "Who Wanna Test"
7. "I Can Feel It"
8. "Full Metal Jacket"
9. "F.A.B."
10. "Deal With The Devil"
11. "Shouts"

== Chart history ==
=== Straight from the Dec ===
Chart (1997)	Peak position
Billboard Top R&B/Hip-Hop Albums	49
Billboard Top Heatseekers	17

=== I Can Feel It ===
Chart (1997)	Peak position
Billboard Hot R&B/Hip-Hop Songs	70
Billboard Hot Rap Singles	33
