= Death Before Dishonesty =

Studio album by Bootleg
- Released: March 23, 1999
- Studio: Silver Sun (Flint, MI); Chung King (New York, NY)
- Genre: Hardcore hip hop; gangsta rap
- Length: 59:18
- Label: Relativity
- Producer: Cory "Co-P" Peterson; Frank Robinson; Jermaine Tipton; Steve Pitts

Bootleg chronology
Death Before Dishonesty (1999)	Hated by Many Loved by Few (2001)

Professional ratings
Review scores
Source	Rating
AllMusic	3/5 stars
The Source	3/5 stars

Death Before Dishonesty is the debut solo studio album by American rapper Bootleg. It was released on March 23, 1999, through Relativity Records. The recording sessions took place at Silver Sun Recording Studio in Flint and at Chung King Studios in New York. The production was handled by Frank Robinson, Jermaine Tipton, Steve Pitts and Cory "Co-P" Peterson. It features guest appearances from Ghetto-E, Mr. Big, Swift-D, Tommy Clipp, Femme Fatale, Jake The Flake, Maddam Dane, MC Breed, Ras Kass, Shawnna and Sophia Taylor. The album peaked at number 91 on the Billboard 200, number 18 on the Top R&B/Hip-Hop Albums and topped the Heatseekers Albums in the United States. It was supported with two promotional singles "No Future" and "Fantasies".

The album marks the Bootleg's temporary departure from the Dayton Family.

== Track listing ==
No.	Title	Producer(s)	Length
1.	"Death Before Dishonesty"	Frank Robinson; Jermaine Tipton; Bootleg (co.)	4:45
2.	"Fantasies" (featuring Shawnna and Sophia Taylor)	Steve Pitts; Bootleg (co.)	4:10
3.	"Celebrate" (featuring Ghetto-E)	Frank Robinson; Jermaine Tipton; Bootleg (co.)	2:29
4.	"Intro"		0:49
5.	"Mama"	Frank Robinson; Jermaine Tipton; Bootleg (co.)	4:59
6.	"Fly Away" (featuring Ghetto-E and Swift-D)	Frank Robinson; Jermaine Tipton; Bootleg (co.)	5:13
7.	"Que the Little Rapper Girl"		0:21
8.	"We Gone Ride" (featuring Mr. Big and Tommy Clipp)	Steve Pitts	5:24
9.	"Run for Cover" (featuring Femme Fatale)	Cory "Co-P" Peterson	3:26
10.	"Bad Guy" (featuring Jake The Flake)	Frank Robinson; Jermaine Tipton; Bootleg (co.)	5:13
11.	"If I Die" (featuring Ghetto-E and Swift-D)	Frank Robinson; Jermaine Tipton; Bootleg (co.)	4:16
12.	"Sophisticated Thugs" (featuring Ras Kass)	Frank Robinson; Jermaine Tipton; Bootleg (co.)	4:59
13.	"No Future" (featuring MC Breed)	Cory "Co-P" Peterson	4:27
14.	"Interlude"		1:02
15.	"Sideways" (featuring Maddam Dane)	Frank Robinson; Jermaine Tipton; Bootleg (co.)	3:37
16.	"Set Up" (featuring Mr. Big and Tommy Clipp)	Frank Robinson; Jermaine Tipton; Bootleg (co.)	4:08
Total length:			59:18

== Personnel ==
- Ira "Bootleg" Dorsey – vocals, co-producer (tracks: 1–3, 5, 6, 10–12, 15, 16), recording assistant (tracks: 1–3, 5, 6, 8, 10–13, 15, 16), executive producer
- Frank Robinson – producer (tracks: 1, 3, 5, 6, 10–12, 15, 16)
- Jermaine Tipton – producer (tracks: 1, 3, 5, 6, 10–12, 15, 16)
- Steve Pitts – producer (tracks: 2, 8)
- Cory "Co-P" Peterson – producer (tracks: 9, 13)
- Bernard Terry – recording (tracks: 1–3, 5, 6, 8, 10–13, 15, 16)
- Johnny Y – recording (track 9), mixing
- Maurice Baker – mixing assistant
- Kerry Horton – associate executive producer
- Chiu Liu – art direction
- David Bett – art direction
- Ken Schles – photography
- Cliff Cultreri – A&R

== Charts ==
Chart (1999)	Peak position
US Billboard 200	91
US Top R&B/Hip-Hop Albums (Billboard)	18
US Heatseekers Albums (Billboard)	1
