= Baby Money =

American rapper

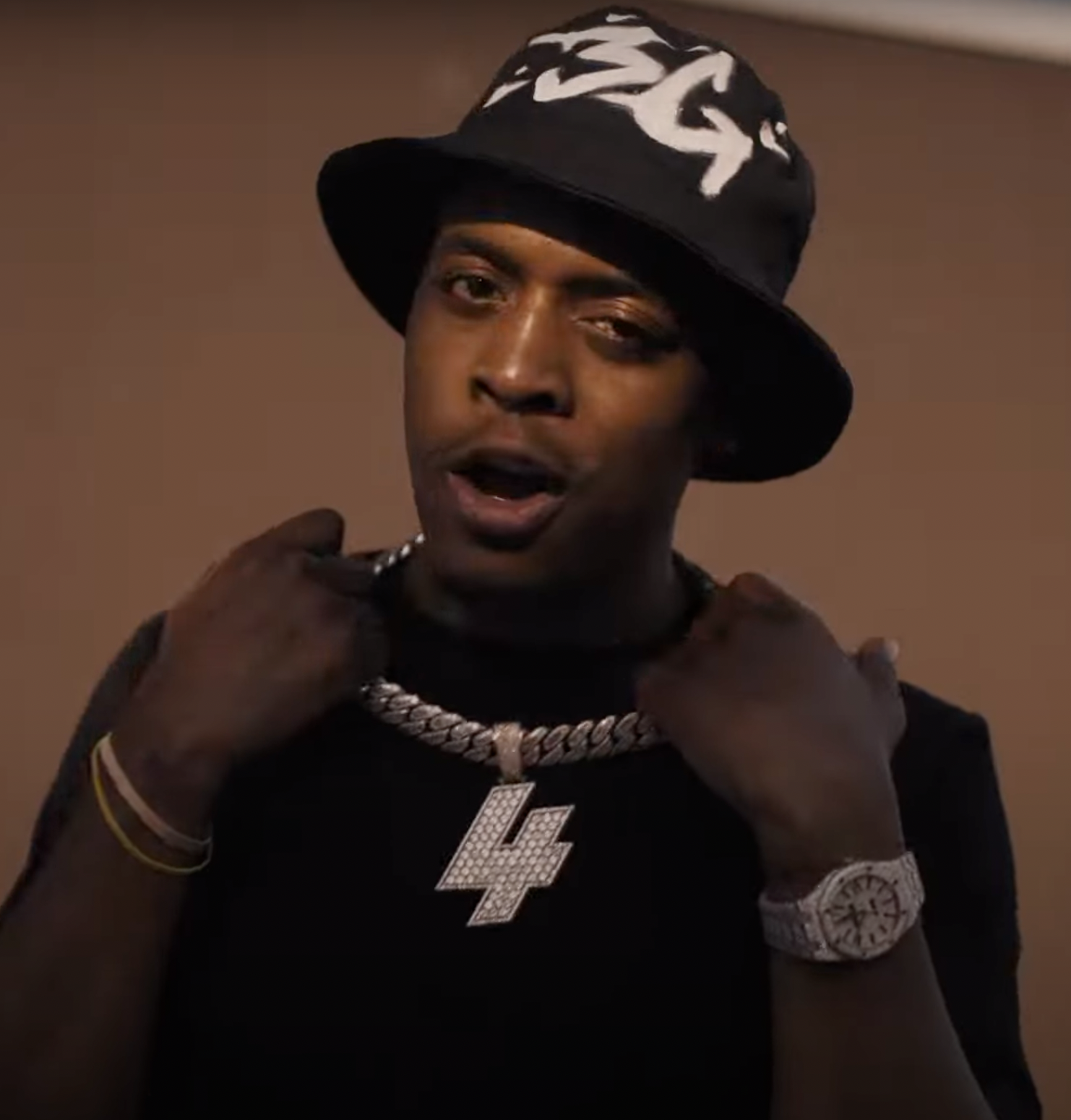
- Baby Money in June 2022

Background information
- Born: Carlos Deshawn Fischer; September 22, 1997 (age 29); Detroit, Michigan U.S.
- Genres: Michigan rap; trap
- Occupations: Rapper; songwriter
- Years active: 2014–present
- Label: Quality Control

Carlos Deshawn Fischer (born September 22, 1997), known professionally as Baby Money, is an American rapper from Detroit, Michigan. He signed with Quality Control Music, an imprint of Motown and Capitol Records in 2022. He is noted as a prominent figure in 2020s Detroit hip hop.

== Career ==
In 2021, he began to gain traction with the release of his single "Moncler Bubble". In January 2022, he signed to Quality Control Music. In February 2022, he released his project Easy Money with appearances from fellow Detroit rapper Babyface Ray, and rappers 42 Dugg, Icewear Vezzo, Tay B and Peezy. In September 2022, he released his project New Money with appearances from rappers Jeezy, Mozzy, Tay B and GT.

== Musical style ==
Writing for XXL, Robby Seabrook III describes Baby Money's style in the following manner: "Baby Money is a sharp, technical rapper with a good sense of humor who spits about making money and showing off as if it's second nature. His style feels reminiscent of Detroit rap's early days, but his always-updated flows bring him into the present."
