= On da Grind =

Studio album by Ghetto Mafia
- Released: October 20, 1998
- Recorded: 1997–1998
- Genre: Gangsta rap, Southern hip hop
- Label: Fully Loaded
- Producer: Ghetto Mafia, Carl "Cooly C" Dorsey

Ghetto Mafia chronology
Straight from the Dec (1997)	On da Grind (1998)	Da Return of Ghetto Mafia (2005)

Professional ratings
Review scores
Source	Rating
XXL	L (3/5)

On da Grind is the fourth studio album by Ghetto Mafia. It was released on October 20, 1998, as the group's second and final album through Fully Loaded Records. The production handled by the Ghetto Mafia and Carl "Cooly C" Dorsey. On da Grind became the group's most successful album, peaking at 169 on the Billboard 200, their only album to make it to that chart. The single, "In Decatur", managed to make it to the Hot R&B/Hip-Hop singles chart.

== Track listing ==
No.	Title	Length
1.	"For 99"	0:19
2.	"Ghetto Mafia"	3:59
3.	"In Decatur"	4:19
4.	"On da Grind"	4:27
5.	"Down Goes His Beeper"	4:40
6.	"Chaos"	0:27
7.	"F.T.K."	4:16
8.	"Dot My Doe"	4:27
9.	"P.A.N."	4:20
10.	"Da Chase"	0:18
11.	"Boyz in Blue"	4:47
12.	"Cell Block G"	4:15
13.	"On da Grind (Remix)"	5:39
14.	"Goin Out with This Gauge"	4:01
15.	"High as Hell"	3:54

== Charts ==
=== On da Grind ===
Chart (1998)	Peak position
Billboard 200	169
Billboard Top R&B/Hip-Hop Albums	34
Billboard Top Heatseekers	6

=== In Decatur ===
Chart (1998)	Peak position
Billboard Hot R&B/Hip-Hop Songs	88
