= Big Baller (album) =

Studio album by MC Breed
- Released: June 20, 1995
- Recorded: 1994–95
- Studio: KALA Studios; Bosstown; The Digital Edge
- Genre: Gangsta rap
- Length: 48:47
- Label: Wrap Records
- Producer: MC Breed; Flash Technology; Shorty B; Carlos Glover; Brett Ski; Jazze Pha; Pee-Wee; Amp Fiddler

MC Breed chronology
Funkafied (1994)	Big Baller (1995)	The Best of Breed (1995)

Singles from Big Baller
- 1. "Sea Of Bud/Some Otha" Released: 1995

Professional ratings
Review scores
Source	Rating
AllMusic	2.5/5 stars

Big Baller is the fourth solo studio album by American rapper MC Breed from Flint, Michigan. It was released on June 20, 1995 via Wrap Records with distribution by Ichiban Records. Recording sessions took place at Kala Recording Studios, Bosstown, and the Digital Edge in Atlanta. Production was handled by MC Breed, Flash, Shorty B, Carlos Glover, Brett Ski, Jazze Pha, Pee-Wee and Amp Fiddler. It features guest appearances from Jibri, Jazze Pha, DJ Hurricane, Joe Riz, Kool-Ace and Too $hort. Big Baller made it to number 143 on the Billboard 200, number 17 on the Top R&B/Hip-Hop Albums, and number 3 on the Top Heatseekers chart. Its lead single, "Sea of Bud", reached number 28 on the Hot Rap Songs chart.

== Track listing ==
No.	Title	Producer(s)	Length
1.	"Intro" (featuring Jazze Pha)	MC Breed; Shorty B; Carlos Glover	3:43
2.	"SFNU"	MC Breed; Shorty B; Pee-Wee	4:36
3.	"Game for Life"	DJ Flash	2:55
4.	"Sea of Bud" (featuring Jibri & Too $hort)	MC Breed	6:12
5.	"Real MC" (featuring DJ Hurricane)	DJ Flash	3:48
6.	"Some Otha"	DJ Flash	3:24
7.	"Say What"	Jazze Pha	4:10
8.	"What Do You Get" (featuring Jibri)	Brett Ski	5:05
9.	"You Slippin'" (featuring Joe Riz)	DJ Flash	4:16
10.	"Nightlife" (featuring Jibri & Kool-Ace)	MC Breed; Shorty B; Carlos Glover	4:40
11.	"Been Round for Years"	MC Breed; Shorty B; DJ Flash; Carlos Glover; Amp Fiddler	4:19
12.	"Outro" (featuring Jazze Pha)	MC Breed; Shorty B; Carlos Glover	1:39
Total length:			48:47

== Charts ==
Chart (1995)	Peak position
US Billboard 200	143
US Top R&B/Hip-Hop Albums (Billboard)	17
US Heatseekers Albums (Billboard)	3
