= Ain't No Future in Yo' Frontin' =

Single by MC Breed & DFC

from the album M.C. Breed & DFC.
- B-side: "Just Kickin' It"
- Released: May 7, 1991
- Genre: Hip hop; G-funk
- Length: 3:58
- Label: S.D.E.G. Records; Ichiban
- Songwriter(s): E. Breed; H. Lang; S. Harris
- Producer(s): MC Breed; Herman Lang; S. Harris

MC Breed & DFC singles chronology
"Ain't No Future in Yo' Frontin'" (1991)	"Just Kickin' It" (1992)

Music video
- "Ain't No Future In Yo' Frontin'" on YouTube

"Ain't No Future in Yo' Frontin'" is a song performed by American hip hop group MC Breed and DFC from Flint, Michigan. It was released in 1991 through S.D.E.G. Records with distribution via Ichiban Records, as a lead single from the trio's debut studio album MC Breed & DFC. It was written, arranged and produced by MC Breed, Herman Lang and S. Harris.

The song was later included in MC Breed's 1995 greatest hits album The Best of Breed, and was featured in the soundtrack to the 1998 film Ringmaster. It was covered by Erick Sermon retitled "Ain't No Future...2001" from his 2001 album Music, by Johnny Richter for Subnoize Souljaz's 2009 album Blast From tha Past, and by Insane Clown Posse for their 2012 album Smothered, Covered & Chunked.

== Track listing ==
No.	Title	Writer(s)	Producer(s)	Length
1.	"Ain't No Future in Yo' Frontin'"	E. Breed; H. Lang; S. Harris	MC Breed; Herman Lang; S. Harris	3:58
2.	"Just Kickin' It"	E. Breed; H. Lang	MC Breed; Herman Lang	3:50

No.	Title	Writer(s)	Producer(s)	Length
1.	"Ain't No Future in Yo' Frontin'" (Future Mix)	E. Breed; H. Lang; S. Harris	MC Breed; Herman Lang; S. Harris	4:23
2.	"Ain't No Future in Yo' Frontin'" (As T'Was Mix)	E. Breed; H. Lang; S. Harris	MC Breed; Herman Lang; S. Harris	3:58

== Personnel ==
- Eric Tyrone Breed – performer, arranger, producer
- Herman Lang, Jr. – arranger, producer, re-mixing
- Schzelle Salomon Harris – arranger, producer
- Bernard Terry – re-mixing

== Charts ==
The single peaked at number 66 on the Billboard Hot 100, at number 47 on the Hot R&B/Hip-Hop Songs and at number 12 on the Hot Rap Songs in the United States, making it the most successful single for both MC Breed and DFC.

Chart (1991–1992)	Peak position
US Billboard Hot 100	66
US Hot R&B/Hip-Hop Songs (Billboard)	47
US Hot Rap Songs (Billboard)	12
