= Lovers Lane (album) =

Studio album by M.C. Brains
- Released: March 17, 1992
- Recorded: 1991–1992
- Genre: Hip hop
- Length: 38:05
- Label: Motown
- Producer: Rico Anderson, Finesse Flavor, Fred Jenkins, Nathan Morris, Radical Rob Onekea

M.C. Brains chronology
Lovers Lane (1992)	Brainwashed (1996)

Singles from Lovers Lane
- 1. "Oochie Coochie" Released: December 3, 1991; 2. "Brainstorming" Released: 1992; 3. "Everybody's Talking About M.C. Brains" Released: 1992

Professional ratings
Review scores
Source	Rating
Allmusic	4.5/5 stars

Lovers Lane is the debut album by M.C. Brains, released on March 17, 1992, through Motown.

The album is perhaps best known for its lead single, "Oochie Coochie", which became the only top-40 hit in M.C. Brains short career, peaking at number 22 on the Billboard Hot 100. The album fared less well, only reaching number 47 on the Billboard 200. Brains' labelmates Boyz II Men were featured on the album's second single "Brainstorming", as well as the song entitled "Boyz II Men (The Sequel)". The latter song's chorus was interpolated in the group's second album, II (1994).

== Track listing ==
No.	Title	Producer	Length
1.	"Oochie Coochie"	Rico Anderson	3:41
2.	"Everybody's Talking About M.C. Brains"	Radical Rob Onekea	4:15
3.	"Brainstorming" (featuring Boyz II Men)	Fred Jenkins, Nathan Morris	5:45
4.	"Boyz II Men (The Sequel)" (featuring Boyz II Men)	Fred Jenkins, Nathan Morris	5:46
5.	"G-String"	Finesse Flavor	3:33
6.	"Brains Goin' Cra-Ze"	Finesse Flavor	3:46
7.	"The "B" Is Dumb"	Finesse Flavor	3:13
8.	"Don't Let Me Get Loose"	Rico Anderson	4:03
9.	"Strawberry Lane"	Rico Anderson	4:03

== Chart history ==
Chart (1992)	Peak position
US Billboard 200	47
US Billboard Top R&B Albums	31

== Personnel ==
- Rico Anderson - Producer, Programming, Vocals (Background)
- Marlene Battles - Vocals (Background)
- Michael Bivins - Vocals (Background)
- Boyz II Men - Vocals (Background)
- James "Thunderbird" Davis - Vocals (Background)
- Finesse Flavor - Engineer, Producer, Programming, Vocals (Background)
- Michael Gibson - Assistant Engineer
- Johnny Gill - Vocals (Background)
- Jim Hinger - Engineer
- Fred Jenkins - Keyboards, Producer, Programming
- Jay Lean - Engineer
- M.C. Brains - Vocals, Vocals (Background)
- Mike Melnick - Engineer
- Nathan Morris - Keyboards, Producer, Programming
- Radical Rob Onekea - Producer
- Morris Rentie - Assistant Engineer, Bass
- Todd Russaw - Vocals (Background)
- Shawn Stockman - Drums, Percussion, Producer
- Ralph Sutton - Engineer
- Tam Rock - Rap, Vocals (Background)
- Jerry Vines - Vocals (Background)
- Kevin Wales - Vocals (Background)
- Danny Clay Williams - Engineer
- Val Young - Vocals (Background)
