= M.C. Brains =

American rapper

- Also known as: M.C. Brainz
- Born: James DeShannon Davis
- Origin: Cleveland, Ohio, United States
- Genres: Hip hop
- Years active: 1990–present
- Labels: Motown, Wrap / Ichiban

M.C. Brains (born James DeShannon Davis) is an American rapper from Cleveland, Ohio, United States. He is best known for his hit single, "Oochie Coochie".

Discovered by Michael Bivins of New Edition, Brains was signed to Motown Records, who issued his debut album Lovers Lane in 1992. The album's lead single, "Oochie Coochie", became a top-40 hit, peaking at number 21 on the Billboard Hot 100 and earning a gold certification four months after its release then on to platinum. In 1996, M.C. Brains (under the name M.C. Brainz) released a second album entitled Brainwashed for Ichiban Records.

== Discography ==
=== Albums ===
Year	Album	Peak chart positions	
Year	Album	U.S.	U.S. R&B
1992	Lovers Lane: Released: March 17, 1992; Label: Motown	47	31
1996	Brainwashed: Released: April 16, 1996; Label: Wrap / Ichiban	–	–

=== Singles ===
Year	Single	Chart positions			Certifications	Album
Year	Single	U.S. Hot 100	U.S. R&B	U.S. Rap	Certifications	Album
1991	"Oochie Coochie"	21	16	1	US: Platinum	Lovers Lane
1992	"Brainstorming" (featuring Boyz II Men)	69	29	19		Lovers Lane
1992	"Everybody's Talking About M.C. Brains"	–	–	23		Lovers Lane
