= Ghetto Mafia =

American hip hop group

- Origin: Decatur, Georgia, United States
- Genres: Hip-hop
- Years active: 1993–2005; 2016
- Labels: Ichiban, Fully Loaded
- Members: Nino; Wicked

The Ghetto Mafia is an American hip hop group from Decatur, Georgia, United States, composed of Nino and Wicked. Formed in 1993, the Ghetto Mafia signed to local hip hop label, Ichiban Records, who then released their debut album, Draw the Line on April 26, 1994. The group then released 1995's Full Blooded Niggaz through Triad Records before joining Fully Loaded Records in 1996. With Fully Loaded, Ghetto Mafia released 1997's Straight from the Dec and their most successful album to date, 1998's On da Grind, which peaked at 169 on the Billboard 200. After a seven-year hiatus, they released Da Return... of Ghetto Mafia in 2005. In 2016, Ghetto Mafia returned with a new single, "Elephant in the Room".

== Discography ==
Year	Title	Chart positions	
Year	Title	U.S.	U.S. R&B
1994	Draw the Line: Released: April 26, 1994; Label: Ichiban	–	79
1995	Full Blooded Niggaz: Released: October 10, 1995; Label: Triad	–	45
1997	Straight from the Dec: Released: April 22, 1997; Label: Fully Loaded	–	49
1998	On da Grind: Released: October 20, 1998; Label: Fully Loaded	169	34
2005	Da Return of... Ghetto Mafia: Released: February 22, 2005; Label: Downsouth Ent.	–	–
