= Flatline (album) =

Studio album by MC Breed
- Released: September 23, 1997
- Genre: Hip-hop
- Length: 50:59
- Label: Wrap
- Producers: Ant Banks; Bullpen Productions; Erotic D.; Jazze Pha; MC Breed; Preston Crump

MC Breed chronology
To Da Beat Ch'all (1996)	Flatline (1997)	It's All Good (1999)

Professional ratings
Review scores
Source	Rating
AllMusic	4/5 stars
RapReviews	7.5/10
The Source	3/5 stars
XXL	M (2/5)

Flatline is the sixth solo studio album by American rapper MC Breed. It was released on September 23, 1997, through Wrap Records, marking his final studio album for the label. Production was handled by Erotic D., Ant Banks, Jazze Pha, Bullpen Productions, Preston Crump, and Breed himself. In the United States, the album debuted at number 48 on the Top R&B/Hip-Hop Albums chart.

== Track listing ==
No.	Title	Writer(s)	Producer(s)	Length
1.	"Floatin' Through the Cosmos"	Eric Breed; Erotic D.; Ernie Burdette	Erotic D	4:26
2.	"My Dove"	Breed; Erotic D.; Tracy Lynn Curry	Erotic D	4:59
3.	"Dreamin'"	Breed; Anthony Banks	Ant Banks	4:55
4.	"Guerrilla Pimpin'"	Breed; Erotic D.; Curry	Erotic D	4:39
5.	"Rule #1"	Breed; Phalon Alexander; Chad Butler	Jazze Pha	3:55
6.	"Café Interlude"	Erotic D.	Erotic D	2:05
7.	"Conclusions"	Breed; Alexander; Todd Shaw	Jazze Pha	5:35
8.	"Lakeside 'Lude"	Breed; Curry	Bullpen Productions	1:21
9.	"Dear Lord"	Breed; Erotic D.; Taranjr Alvarado	Erotic D	3:50
10.	"Whatcha Mad At?"	Breed; Preston Crump	MC Breed; Preston Crump	4:03
11.	"Flatline"	Breed; Erotic D.	Erotic D	2:58
12.	"Duece Shot"	Breed; Erotic D.	Erotic D	3:53
13.	"Break of Dawn"	Breed; Banks	Ant Banks	4:20
Total length:				50:59

== Charts ==
Chart (1997)	Peak position
US Top R&B/Hip-Hop Albums (Billboard)	48
