= Neil Abramson (filmmaker) =

American artist

- Born: 1963; Johannesburg, South Africa
- Known for: film, music video director

Neil Abramson (born 1963) is an American artist who works in film, music video and commercials. He is known for his feature films American Son (2008), Bob Smith, U.S.A. (2005), Ringmaster (1998), Soldier Child (1998) and Without Air (1995).

== Early life, education, music video & commercial work ==
Neil Abramson was born in Johannesburg, South Africa, in 1963. He moved with his family to Los Angeles in 1979, where he attended UCLA and Pasadena's ArtCenter College of Design. He has directed more than 30 commercials and more than 40 music videos.

== Feature films & Sundance ==
His first feature film, Without Air debuted at the 1996 Sundance Film Festival. His documentary Bob Smith, U.S.A. is "a look at seven of the more than 81,000 Americans named Bob Smith". His documentary Soldier Child covers the rehabilitation of child soldiers who have escaped the Lord's Resistance Army in Northern Uganda. It was screened at The Hague, United States Congress and used by Amnesty international to raise awareness of the child soldier issue. His most recent feature film, American Son, stars Nick Cannon and competed in the Dramatic Competition at the 2008 Sundance Film Festival.
