= The Fharmacist =

Studio album by MC Breed
- Released: May 8, 2001
- Recorded: 2000–01
- Genre: Hip hop
- Label: Fharmacy Records Inc
- Producer: MC Breed, Jazze Pha, The D.O.C., Dog, Corey Peterson, Gee Pierce

MC Breed chronology
Rare Breed (2000)	The Fharmacist (2001)	Chopped and Screwed (2002)

Professional ratings
Review scores
Source	Rating
Allmusic	3/5 stars

The Fharmacist is the eighth album released by MC Breed. It was released on May 8, 2001, for Fharmacy Recordings and featured production from MC Breed, Jazze Pha, The D.O.C., Dog, Corey Peterson and Gee Pierce. By the time this album was released, Breed's popularity had greatly decreased, thus the album did not make it to the Billboard charts. His single "Let's Go To The Club" received massive airplay in his native Detroit area, but not as much elsewhere. It is his most successful single since 1991's "Ain't No Future in Yo Frontin'". On September 17, 2001, "Let's Go to the Club" broke the record for any other Detroit radio airplays.

== Track listing ==
1. "Intro"- 2:47
2. "Let's Go to the Club"- 4:22 (featuring Jazze Pha)
3. "Baller"- 4:28
4. "Off the Dribble"- 4:29
5. "Goodie"- 3:27
6. "Ounce in Her Boot"- 3:56
7. "How Many Niggas You Know"- 3:55 (featuring Bootleg)
8. "Interlude"- :57
9. "Hot Ones"- 3:25 (featuring Money Grip and Ruce Duce)
10. "Killa Instinct"- 2:20
11. "Show Me How It Work"- 3:16
12. "Bullet Proof"- 4:09
13. "You Don't Know"- 3:23
14. "Outro"- 2:25
