= DFC (group) =

American hip hop group

- Origin: Flint, Michigan, US
- Genres: Hip hop
- Years active: 1989–1999
- Labels: Big Beat/Atlantic, Penalty
- Past members: Al Breed; T-Dub

DFC was an American hip hop duo composed of Flint, Michigan natives Alpha "Al" Breed and Bobby "T-Dub" Thompson. They were closely associated with MC Breed who was also Al's cousin.

DFC stands for Da Funk Clan.

MC Breed and DFC released their collaborative debut album on November 11, 1991 entitled MC Breed & DFC, which charted at number 142 on the Billboard 200 and featured their most successful single, "Ain't No Future in Yo' Frontin'".

After MC Breed & DFC, DFC signed with Atlantic Records and were placed on their subsidiary Big Beat Records. They then released 1994's Things in tha Hood which became their most successful album, peaking at number 71 on the Billboard 200 and spawning the singles "Caps Get Peeled" and "Thing in tha Hood". They followed up with 1997's The Whole World's Rotten, but disbanded in 1999 after appearing on MC Breed's It's All Good.

== Discography ==
=== Studio albums ===
Title	Release	Peak chart positions	
Title	Release	US	US R&B
Things in tha Hood	Released: March 22, 1994; Label: Big Beat Records/Atlantic	71	7
The Whole World's Rotten	Released: November 25, 1997; Label: Penalty	—	92

=== Collaboration albums ===
Title	Release	Peak chart positions	
Title	Release	US	US R&B
MC Breed & DFC with MC Breed	Released: November 11, 1991; Label: Ichiban	142	38

=== Compilation albums ===
- The Hits with MC Breed (2007)

=== Singles ===
Title	Release	Peak chart positions			Album
Title	Release	US	US R&B	US Rap	Album
"Ain't No Future in Yo' Frontin'" (with MC Breed)	1991	66	47	12	MC Breed & DFC
"Caps Get Peeled" (featuring MC Eiht)	1994	—	78	16	Things in tha Hood
"Things in tha Hood" (featuring MC Breed and Nate Dogg)	1994	—	98	23	Things in tha Hood
"Listen (Five Minutes)"	1997	—	85	18	The Whole World's Rotten
