= Ringmaster (film) =

- Theatrical release poster
- Directed by: Neil Abramson
- Written by: Jon Bernstein
- Produced by: Gary W. Goldstein
- Starring: Jerry Springer; Jaime Pressly; William McNamara; Molly Hagan; John Capodice; Wendy Raquel Robinson; Michael Jai White; Michael Dudikoff
- Cinematography: Russ Lyster
- Edited by: Suzanne Hines
- Music by: Kennard Ramsey
- Production companies: Motion Picture Corporation of America; The Kushner-Locke Company
- Distributed by: Artisan Entertainment
- Release date: November 25, 1998
- Running time: 90 minutes
- Country: United States
- Language: English
- Budget: $20 million
- Box office: $9,257,103

Ringmaster is a 1998 American comedy film starring Jerry Springer as a fictional version of himself named Jerry Farrelly, host of a show similar to his own called Jerry.

== Plot ==
There are three ongoing plots in the film. The primary one surrounds a white trash, trailer park family in which Angel, the daughter, is sleeping with her mother's husband, prompting the mother to constantly try to outdo her promiscuous daughter's behavior out of spite, including sleeping with her daughter's boyfriend.

The secondary plot revolves around a black woman called Starletta whose boyfriend Demond is sleeping with her two best friends, but the three are united against Demond when he eyes up Angel. He spends the rest of the film trying to have sex with Angel, while his jealous girlfriend Starletta tries to stop him. Unfortunately for Starletta, Angel manages to sneak Demond into her hotel room. Starletta stalks the hotel corridors desperate to stop her boyfriend, but fails to stop Demond from bedding her busty love rival

The third plot revolves around Jerry and the show itself, detailing the difficulty Jerry faces in trying to come to terms with his rather dubious claim to fame, and the staff's utter amazement at the bizarre stories they must deal with. A minor sub-plot involves a producer on the show who mistakenly picks up one of the guests, a self-proclaimed "man-by-day-woman-by-night."

== Cast ==
- Jerry Springer as Jerry Farrelly
- Jaime Pressly as Angel Zorzak
- William McNamara as Troy Davenport
- Molly Hagan as Connie Zorzak
- John Capodice as Mel Riley
- Wendy Raquel Robinson as Starletta
- Ashley Holbrook as Willie
- Tangie Ambrose as Vonda Simmons
- Nicki Micheaux as Leshawnette
- Michael Jai White as Demond
- Krista Tesreau as Catherine Winicott
- Dawn Maxey as Natalie
- Maximilliana as Charlie / Claire
- Michael Dudikoff as Rusty

== Production ==
In March 1998, it was reported Jerry Springer had entered into a $2 million pay-or-play deal with producer Steve Stabler after The Jerry Springer Show became the first Talk show in ten years to beat The Oprah Winfrey Show in the ratings. Stabler held discussions with both Universal Pictures and MGM for financing and distribution deals. In July of that year, Neil Abramson had been slated to direct the film from a script by Jon Bernstein that would follow Springer playing a fictionalized version of himself interacting with two sets of guests who get on The Jerry Springer Show. Filming took place over the course of August. In October, Artisan Entertainment acquired distribution rights to the film.

== Release ==
The film was released theatrically on November 25, 1998 before a home video release on March 23, 1999.

== Reception ==
The film had a generally negative reception. The review aggregator website Rotten Tomatoes gave it a 21% approval rating, with an average rating of 3.8/10. The website's consensus reads, "A crude, idiotic mess of a film." The film won a Golden Raspberry Award for Worst New Star (Jerry Springer, tied with Joe Eszterhas for his small cameo in An Alan Smithee Film: Burn Hollywood Burn). The film was a box office bomb, grossing back less than half its budget.

== Soundtrack ==
A soundtrack containing hip hop music was released on March 23, 1999 by Lil' Joe Records. It peaked at number 80 on the Top R&B/Hip-Hop Albums.

The film also features the single Talk Show Shh! by Shae Jones which peaked at number 88 on the Billboard Hot 100. A music video for the song was made to promote the film and featured Springer. However, the song was not included on the soundtrack album.
