= DJ Hurricane =

American hip hop DJ, producer and rapper (born 1965)

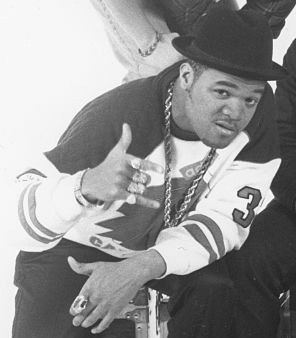
- Hurricane in 1987

Background information
- Also known as: Hurricane
- Born: Wendell Timothy Fite; January 12, 1965 (age 61); Dallas, Texas, U.S.
- Origin: New York City, U.S.
- Genres: Hip hop
- Occupations: Disc jockey; rapper; producer
- Years active: 1985–present
- Labels: GR Entertainment; Don't Sleep Productions

Wendell Timothy Fite, also known as DJ Hurricane (born January 12, 1965) is an American hip hop DJ, producer and rapper. He is best known for his work with the Beastie Boys. He was a member of the groups Solo Sounds and the Afros and recorded three solo albums, featuring many well-known artists such as Xzibit, Public Enemy, Kool G Rap, Black Thought, Papoose and Talib Kweli.

== Career ==
One of New York's premier hip-hop artists on the turntables, DJ Hurricane fostered his skills alongside Run D.M.C. in the Hollis, Queens area of New York City. His first hip-hop experience was with Davy DMX, the first hip-hop DJ from Hollis. Hurricane became his rapper for The Solo Sounds crew who performed at block parties and Russell Simmons promotion events. He was also a member of the Hollis Crew. Hurricane began rhyming at the age of 13, and was best friends with Jam Master Jay in school.

When Jam Master Jay got the job to DJ for Run D.M.C., he asked Hurricane to come on tour. While serving as a bodyguard on the 1986 Raising Hell tour, he became friends with the Beastie Boys, who were the tour's opening act. Hurricane and Davy DMX collaborated and made Davy's Ride album in 1987. The next big tour The Together Forever Tour, with Run-DMC, The Beastie Boys and Davy DMX, saw Hurricane perform with all three acts every night. Hurricane later formed the Hollis, Queens-based novelty group The Afros along with DJ Kippy-O and Kool Tee. The Afros were the first group signed to Jam Master Jay's JMJ Records, releasing the single "Feel It" and the album Kickin' Afrolistics in 1990. They made cameos in various rap music videos and concerts before disbanding.

When the Beastie Boys were stuck without a DJ they asked Hurricane to sit in and he did them a favor. It was not long before the Beasties returned the favor and offered Hurricane an opportunity to be their exclusive DJ. That gig would last for 13 years. In 1993, along with the Beastie Boys, he contributed the track "It's The New Style" to the AIDS-benefit album No Alternative produced by the Red Hot Organization. DJ Hurricane also produced songs on MC Breed's "Fundafied" album, including the cut "This Is How We Do It 1" featuring George Clinton in 1994. As the Beasties rose in fame with each successive album in the 1990s, Hurricane simultaneously reveled in the spotlight, releasing his first solo album in 1995 on Grand Royal, titled The Hurra (guest artists include the Beastie Boys, MC Breed, and Sen Dog). The single "Stick 'em Up" was the first single on the CB4 movie soundtrack. Hurricane started his own production company, Don't Sleep Productions, in 1999. In 2025, DJ Hurricane released an album named Category 6 on Hollis Park Records distributed by Madison/Sony

After having parted ways with the Beasties prior to their album Hello Nasty in 1998, Hurricane co-wrote the song "Three MC's and One DJ" for them. His second album, Severe Damage, was only released in the UK (on Wiija Records) and Asia. Hurricane's third solo album via TVT, Don't Sleep, found him much more conceptually collected and with a broad scope of guest artists, including Kool G Rap, Xzibit, Scott Weiland, Public Enemy, Rah Digga, Talib Kweli, Pharoahe Monch, Ad-Rock, Black Thought, Big Gipp and Hittman, among others. Hurricane produced the entire album. The track "Come Get It" featured Flipmode Squad peaked at No. 73 of Billboard Hot R&B/Hip-Hop Songs.

== Discography ==
=== Solo ===
==== 1997 – Severe Damage ====
Severe Damage

Studio album by DJ Hurricane
- Released: October 20, 1997
- Genre: East Coast hip hop
- Length: 41:53
- Label: Wiiija Records
- Producer: DJ Hurricane (also exec.); Sniper Unit (also exec.); DJ Nabs; Ad-Rock; Rick Ski

Singles from Severe Damage
- 1. "Japanese Eyes / The Pit" Released: 1997; 2. "Coast To Coast" Released: 1997

Professional ratings
Review scores
Source	Rating
Allmusic	link

No.	Title	Producer(s)	Length
1.	"Severe Damage"	DJ Hurricane; Swift C	1:07
2.	"East West South"	DJ Hurricane; Swift C	4:07
3.	"The Pit"	DJ Hurricane; Swift C	3:43
4.	"Coast To Coast" (featuring Sniper Unit)	D-Rock; Swift C	4:16
5.	"Japanese Eyes"	DJ Hurricane; Ad-Rock; DJ Nabs	3:08
6.	"Ain't No Love"	Swift C	3:59
7.	"Turn Yourself Around"	DJ Hurricane	3:15
8.	"Shaftman Smack Dat Ass" (featuring Alexis)	DJ Hurricane; Swift C	3:57
9.	"Billionaire Dreams"	DJ Hurricane; DJ Nabs (co.)	2:26
10.	"A Made Man"	Swift C; Rick Ski (co.)	4:06
11.	"9mm's & Techs"	Swift C	3:40
12.	"Back On The Set" (featuring Sniper Unit)	DJ Hurricane	4:16
Total length:			41:53

==== 2000 – Don't Sleep ====
Don't Sleep

Studio album by DJ Hurricane
- Released: October 10, 2000
- Genre: East Coast hip hop
- Length: 52:13
- Label: TVT Records
- Producer: DJ Hurricane; Sniper Unit; Doug Grean; Scott Weiland

Singles from Don't Sleep
- 1. "Connect" Released: 2000

Professional ratings
Review scores
Source	Rating
Allmusic	link

No.	Title	Producer(s)	Length
1.	"Ghost" (featuring Miss Pluke)	DJ Hurricane	1:46
2.	"Make Things Better" (featuring Talib Kweli & N'Dea Davenport)	DJ Hurricane; Swift C (co.)	3:06
3.	"Connect" (featuring Big Gipp, Pharoahe Monch & Xzibit)	De Roc	3:23
4.	"Keep It Real" (featuring Faith Evans & The Lost Boyz)	DJ Hurricane; Swift C (co.); Bruno Ravel (add.)	3:17
5.	"Come Get It" (featuring Lord Have Mercy, Rah Digga & Rampage)	DJ Hurricane; De Roc	4:23
6.	"Interlude" (featuring Mike Lowery)	DJ Hurricane	0:38
7.	"Freeze The Frame" (featuring Public Enemy & Money Mark)	DJ Hurricane; De Roc	3:04
8.	"The Life" (featuring Jinx Da Juvy, Kool G Rap & Papoose)	De Roc	3:39
9.	"How We Doin' It" (featuring Barron Ricks, Heather B. & The Underdogs)	Swift C	3:35
10.	"Hurra's So Fly" (featuring CheDuke & Dawn Fite)	DJ Hurricane; Sniper Unit (co.)	2:24
11.	"Blow It Up" (featuring Hittman)	Swift C	3:26
12.	"Conjunction Verb Interlude"	DJ Hurricane	0:54
13.	"Can't Stop Us Now" (featuring Barron Ricks)	DJ Hurricane; De Roc (co.)	3:19
14.	"Kickin' Wicked Rhymes" (featuring Ad-Rock & Black Thought)	DJ Hurricane	3:05
15.	"Shake 'Em" (featuring Choclair & Infinite)	DJ Hurricane; De Roc (co.)	3:35
16.	"Paint My House Interlude"	DJ Hurricane	0:44
17.	"We Will Rock You" (featuring Scott Weiland)	DJ Hurricane; Doug Grean; Scott Weiland	3:06
18.	"Background" (featuring Sniper Unit)	DJ Hurricane; Sniper Unit (co.)	2:24
Total length:			52:13

- Song "Come Get It" appeared in Whiteboys (Original Motion Picture Soundtrack)
- Song "We Will Rock You" appeared in Ready To Rumble (Soundtrack)
- A&R - Leonard B. Johnson

=== With Beastie Boys ===
1992	Check Your Head
1994	Ill Communication
