= MC Breed =

American rapper from Michigan

- Breed in the 2000s

Background information
- Also known as: Breed
- Born: Eric Tyrone Breed; June 12, 1971; Flint, Michigan, U.S.
- Died: November 22, 2008 (aged 37) Ypsilanti, Michigan, U.S.
- Genre: Hip hop
- Occupations: Rapper; record producer
- Years active: 1989–2008
- Labels: SDEG; Wrap; Ichiban; Power; Fharmacy; Urban Music Zone; Psychopathic

Eric Tyrone Breed (June 12, 1971 – November 22, 2008), better known as MC Breed, was an American rapper best known for his singles "Ain't No Future in Yo' Frontin'", which peaked at No. 66 on the Billboard Hot 100 and "Gotta Get Mine" (featuring 2Pac), that made it to number 6 on the Hot Rap Singles.

== Career ==
Born in Flint, Michigan, Breed launched his career in the Detroit hip-hop scene, and was one of the first nationally successful rappers to come out of this scene. Breed's first album was released with rap group DFC and was entitled MC Breed & DFC for independent record label SDEG Records. His solo debut was 1992's 20 Below, after which he released 1993's The New Breed. He would go on to have an extensive discography and have a long career that was at times successful, but he never fully broke into the mainstream. His highest-charting album was 1994's Funkafied, which peaked at No. 106 on the Billboard 200. Through his career, he would align himself with various rap scenes; some of which were early in his career with DFC. He and the group were independents, making them one of the first groups out of the Midwest. However, later in his career he aligned himself with the West Coast, taking on more of a G-funk sound and befriending West Coast rapper Too Short. Still later, he realigned himself once again with the dirty south for 1995's Big Baller.

Breed released two more albums with Wrap Records—1996's To Da Beat Ch'all and 1997's Flatline—to fulfill his contract with the label. In 1998, Breed signed a deal with Power Records, who had distribution through Roadrunner Records, and released the album, It's All Good, in 1999. 2 for the Show, a compilation showcasing some of Breed's famous collaborations with 2Pac, Too Short, and more, followed later that year. In 2000, Breed starred in the straight-to-video movie, Dollar, alongside Shannon Greer, and released a soundtrack for it, which featured his hit, "Ain't No Future in Yo' Frontin'". Breed also released a compilation that year titled The Thugz, Vol. 1, and featured Too Short, Richie Rich, Bootleg of the Dayton Family, and more. It would end up being his last release with Power Records.

In 2001, Breed released his 13th album, The Fharmacist, with an up-start independent label based out of Detroit, Michigan called Fharmacy Records. The album featured the Jazze Pha produced hit, "Let's Go To The Club", and a guest appearance from Bootleg of the Dayton Family. The album liner notes advertised many upcoming releases, including a collaboration album between Breed and Bootleg under the group name "Flintstones", and a movie starring Breed with an accompanying soundtrack titled Got To Get Mine. No other releases came to fruition, and Fharmacy Records soon diminished.

Breed re-emerged in 2004 with a new deal through Urban Music Zone Entertainment, a subsidiary label of Psychopathic Records, to release his album The New Prescription. The album was released in August of that year with national distribution through RED Distribution/Sony, and featured Esham, who was signed to Psychopathic Records at the time. The album did not receive much promotion, but a music video was made for the album's only single, "Rap Game".

== Legal issues ==
On May 11, 2006, Breed was sentenced to one year in prison for violating probation for failure to pay over $200,000 in child support. On April 3, 2008, he was arrested in Flint, Michigan, following an in-store autograph signing session, on warrants for about $220,000 in unpaid child support.

== Death ==
On September 5, 2008, Breed was hospitalized and placed on life-support after he collapsed when his kidneys failed during a game of pickup basketball. On November 22, 2008, he died in his sleep while at a friend's home in Ypsilanti, Michigan.

Before his sudden death, Breed was preparing to release a DVD documentary about his life, titled Where Is MC Breed?. He was also working on a new album, titled The Original Breed: Swag Heavy, which was intended to be released through his former label Ichiban Records. Although the project was still in development, Breed had reached out to many of his friends to help create the album, such as producers Erotic D, Ant Banks, Jazze Pha, Sonji Mickey, and Colin Wolfe, as well as rappers the D.O.C., Spice 1, and Too Short. Breed stated the album was half finished in September 2008 when he was released from the hospital after being on life support for two days. According to MLive.com, Breed had recorded his last song two days before his death, called "Everyday I Wait" and featuring Outlawz.

== Discography ==
=== Studio albums ===
Title	Release	Peak chart positions	
Title	Release	US	US R&B
20 Below	1992	155	40
The New Breed	1993	156	17
Funkafied	1994	106	9
Big Baller	1995	143	17
To Da Beat Ch'all	1996	—	34
Flatline	1997	—	48
It's All Good	1999	180	41
The Fharmacist	2001	—	—
The New Prescription	2004	—	—

=== Collaboration albums ===
Title	Release	Peak chart positions	
Title	Release	US	US R&B
MC Breed & DFC with DFC	Released: November 11, 1991; Label: Ichiban	142	38

=== Compilation albums ===
- The Best of Breed (1995)
- Saucy, Vol. One (1997)
- 2 for the Show (1999)
- The Thugz, Vol. 1 (2000)
- Rare Breed (2000)
- Chopped and Screwed (2002)
- The Mix Tape (2004)
- The Hits with DFC (2007)

=== Guest appearances ===
- 1994: "Death B-4 Dishonesty", "Things in tha Hood" & "You Can Get the D*ck" (from the DFC album, Things in tha Hood)
- 1994: "Sesshead Funky Junky" (from the 8Ball & MJG album, On the Outside Looking In)
- 1995: "We Do This" (from the Too Short album, Cocktails, ft. 2Pac, Father Dom)
- 1996: "Buy You Some", "Never Talk Down" & "F*ck My Car" (from the Too Short album, Gettin' It (Album Number Ten))
- 1997: "Ain't Nobody" & "Wastin' Time" (from the DFC album, The Whole World's Rotten)
- 1997: "4 tha Hustlas" (from the Ant Banks album, Big Thangs, ft. Too Short, 2Pac, Otis & Shugg)
- 1999: "No Future" (from the Bootleg album, Death Before Dishonesty)
- 2001: "Candy Paint" (from the Too Short album, Chase the Cat)
- 2004: "Do You" & "It's On" (from the Slum Village album, Detroit Deli (A Taste of Detroit))
- 2005: "Everyday Hoe" (from The Dayton Family album, Family Feud)
- 2005: "Ali" (from the Proof album, Searching for Jerry Garcia)
- 2012: "Interlude: Every Coincidence Is Significant" (title track from the Audio Stepchild album)
- 2012: "Crazy" (from the Obie Trice album, Bottoms Up)
