= Ichiban Records =

American independent record label

Ichiban Records was an American independent record label, founded in 1985 by John Abbey and Nina Easton in Atlanta, Georgia, United States.

== History ==
Wrap Records and Nastymix Records were some of its subsidiary labels. Urgent! Records and Mr. Henry Records of Houston were both distributed by Ichiban. Besides recording a string of hip hop groups in later years, Ichiban originally specialised in blues and has also released albums by musicians such as Buster Benton and Raful Neal. Ichiban filed for Chapter 11 bankruptcy in 1999. The catalog is now controlled by EMI, but nothing has been reissued since the label ceased operations.

The label's name, "ichi-ban", is Japanese for "number one" or "first one", an expression commonly used in Japan to mean the best.

== Notable artists ==
=== Hip hop ===
- A.W.O.L.
- Detroit's Most Wanted
- DFC
- DJ Smurf
- Gangsta Pat
- Ghetto Mafia
- Hard Boyz
- Insane Poetry
- Kid Sensation
- Kilo Ali
- Kool Moe Dee
- Lil John
- MC Brains
- MC Breed
- Rodney O & Joe Cooley
- Sir Mix-a-Lot
- Success-n-Effect
- Vanilla Ice
- Willie D

=== Soul ===
- Clarence Carter
- Willie Clayton
- Millie Jackson
- Barbara Lynn
- The Three Degrees
- Tyrone Davis
- Little Johnny Taylor
- Scola

=== Funk ===
- Slave

=== Blues/jazz/rock ===
- Roy Ayers
- Buster Benton
- Ben E. King
- Gary B.B. Coleman
- Dash Rip Rock
- Deadeye Dick
- The Fleshtones
- Little Mike and the Tornadoes
- Luther "Houserocker" Johnson
- Joey Gilmore
- Big Joe & the Dynaflows
- Ernie Lancaster
- Trudy Lynn
- Jerry McCain
- Floyd Miles
- Raful Neal
- Phunk Junkeez
- Tom Principato
- Artie "Blues Boy" White
- Blues Boy Willie
- Chick Willis

== See also ==
- Stax Records
- Goldwax Records
