= Too Short discography =

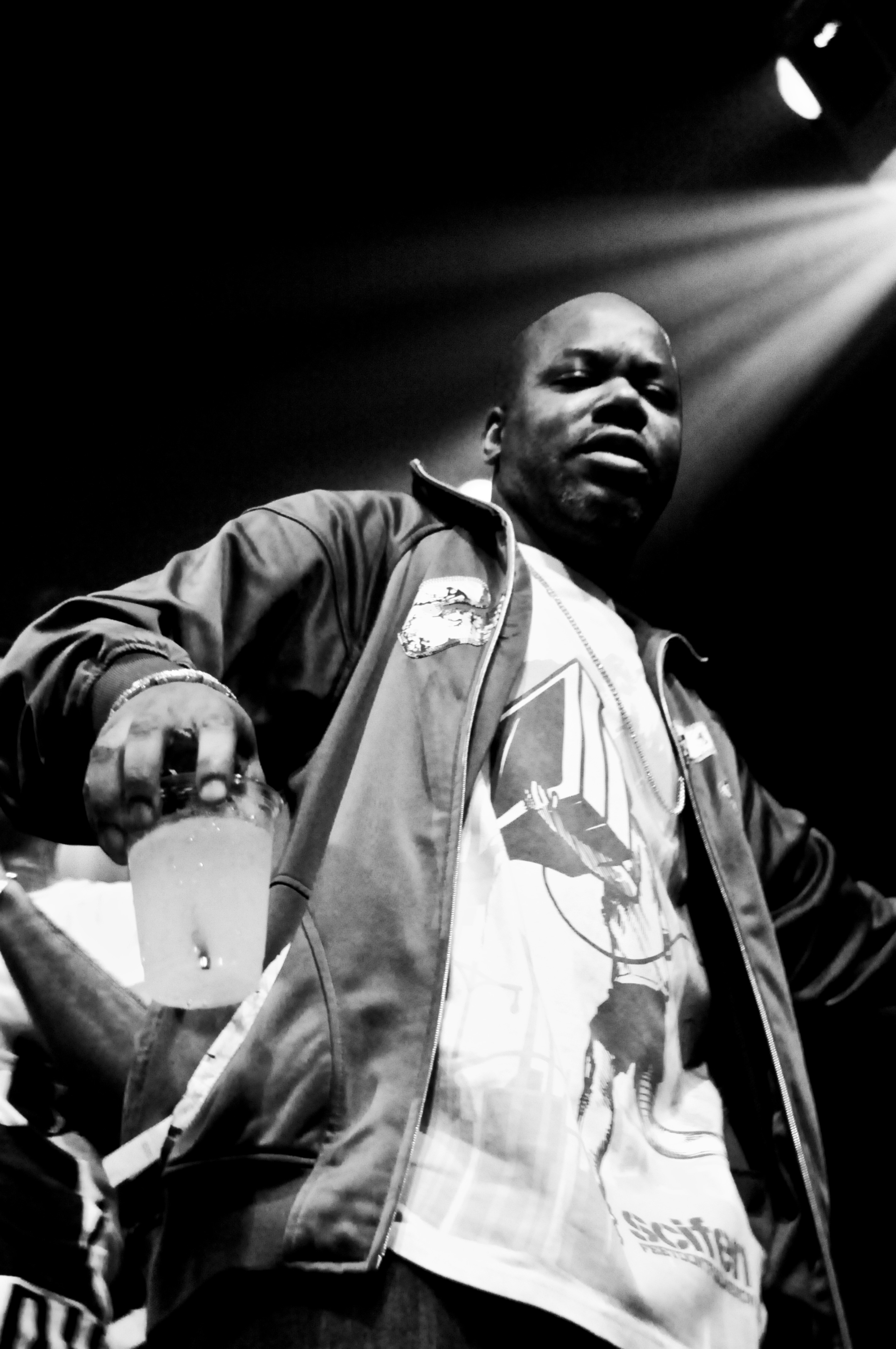
- Studio albums: 22
- Extended plays: 2
- Compilation albums: 7
- Singles: 24
- Collaborative albums: 3
- Mixtapes: 3
- Video albums: 2
- Guest appearances: 101

The discography of American rapper Too Short includes twenty-two studio albums, three collaborative albums, seven compilation albums, two extended plays and three mixtapes.

== Albums ==
=== Studio albums ===
Title	Album details	Peak chart positions		Certifications
Title	Album details	US	US R&B	Certifications
Don't Stop Rappin'	Released: October 24, 1983; Label: 75 Girls; Format: LP, cassette	—	—	
Players	Released: May 27, 1985; Label: 75 Girls; Format: Cassette	—	—	
Raw, Uncut and X-Rated	Released: November 5, 1986; Label: 75 Girls; Format: Cassette	—	—	
Born to Mack	Released: July 20, 1987; Label: Dangerous Music, Jive; Format: CD, LP, cassette, digital download	—	50	RIAA: Gold
Life Is... Too Short	Released: January 31, 1989; Label: Dangerous Music, Jive; Format: CD, LP, cassette, digital download	37	9	RIAA: 2× Platinum
Short Dog's in the House	Released: September 11, 1990; Label: Dangerous Music, Jive; Format: CD, LP, cassette, digital download	20	3	RIAA: Platinum
Shorty the Pimp	Released: July 14, 1992; Label: Dangerous Music, Jive; Format: CD, LP, cassette, digital download	6	11	RIAA: Platinum
Get in Where You Fit In	Released: October 26, 1993; Label: Dangerous Music, Jive; Format: CD, LP, cassette, digital download	4	1	RIAA: Platinum
Cocktails	Released: January 24, 1995; Label: Dangerous Music, Jive; Format: CD, LP, cassette, digital download	6	1	RIAA: Platinum
Gettin' It (Album Number Ten)	Released: May 21, 1996; Label: Dangerous Music, Jive; Format: CD, LP, cassette, digital download	3	1	RIAA: Platinum
Can't Stay Away	Released: July 13, 1999; Label: $hort, Jive; Format: CD, cassette, digital download	5	1	RIAA: Gold
You Nasty	Released: September 12, 2000; Label: $hort, Jive; Format: CD, cassette, digital download	12	4	RIAA: Gold
Chase the Cat	Released: November 20, 2001; Label: $hort, Jive; Format: CD, cassette, digital download	71	14	
What's My Favorite Word?	Released: October 29, 2002; Label: $hort, Jive; Format: CD, cassette, digital download	38	8	
Married to the Game	Released: November 4, 2003; Label: $hort, Jive; Format: CD, cassette, digital download	49	7	
Blow the Whistle	Released: August 29, 2006; Label: $hort, Jive; Format: CD, digital download	14	7	
Get off the Stage	Released: December 4, 2007; Label: $hort, Jive; Format: CD, digital download	160	21	
Still Blowin'	Released: April 6, 2010; Label: Dangerous Music; Format: Digital download	—	70	
No Trespassing	Released: February 28, 2012; Label: Dangerous Music; Format: CD, digital download	129	23	
The Pimp Tape	Released: November 9, 2018; Label: Dangerous Music, Empire; Format: CD, LP, digital download	—	—	
The Vault	Released: December 20, 2019; Label: Dangerous Music, Empire; Format: Digital download	—	—	
Sir Too $hort, Volume One (Freaky Tales)	Released: April 18, 2025; Label: Empire; Format: Digital download	—	—	
Sir Too $hort, Volume Two (Drink & Smoke)	Released: July 31, 2026; Label: Empire; Format: Digital download	—	—	

=== Collaborative albums ===
Title	Album details	Peak chart positions		
Title	Album details	US	US R&B	US Rap
Dangerous Crew (with The Dangerous Crew)	Released: 1988; Label: Dangerous Music; Format: LP, cassette	—	—	—
Don't Try This at Home (with The Dangerous Crew)	Released: November 21, 1995; Label: Dangerous Music, Jive; Format: CD, cassette, digital download	191	23	—
History: Mob Music (with E-40)	Released: November 6, 2012; Label: Heavy on the Grind, EMI; Format: CD, digital download	71	11	7
History: Function Music (with E-40)	Released: November 6, 2012; Label: Heavy on the Grind, EMI; Format: CD, digital download	62	9	6
Ain't Gone Do It/Terms and Conditions (with E-40)	Released: December 18, 2020; Label: Trunk, 3T, Heavy on the Grind, Empire; Format: CD, digital download	—	—	—
Snoop Cube 40 $hort (with Mount Westmore)	Released: December 9, 2022; Label: MNRK; Format: CD, digital download	188	—	—

=== Compilation albums ===
Title	Album details	Peak chart positions		Certifications
Title	Album details	US	US R&B	Certifications
Greatest Hits	Released: November 10, 1993; Label: In-A-Minute; Format: CD, LP, cassette, digital download	—	—	
Don't Try This at Home	Released: November 21, 1995; Label: Dangerous Music, Jive; Format: CD, LP, cassette, digital download	191	23	
Nationwide: Independence Day	Released: May 19, 1998; Label: $hort, Jive; Format: CD, cassette, digital download	38	7	RIAA: Gold
Nationwide 2: Ghetto Pass	Released: October 24, 2000; Label: $hort; Format: CD, cassette, digital download	—	—	
It's About Time	Released: March 11, 2003; Label: 75 Girls; Format: CD, digital download; Collects his first three EPs into a two disc release	—	—	
The Mack of the Century	Released: November 28, 2006; Label: $hort, Jive; Format: CD, digital download	—	47	

== Extended plays ==
Title	EP details
Respect the Pimpin'	Released: December 14, 2010; Label: Dangerous Music, Empire; Format: Digital download
19,999: The EP	Released: November 4, 2014; Label: Dangerous Music, Empire; Format: Digital download

== Mixtapes ==
Title	Mixtape details	Peak chart positions	
Title	Mixtape details	US	US R&B
Too $hort Mixtape Volume 1: Nation Riders	Released: 1999; Label: $hort; Format: CD, cassette	197	45
Gangsters & Strippers Volume 1	Released: April 25, 2006; Label: Up All Nite; Format: CD, digital download	—	77
Hella Disrespectful: Bay Area Mixtape	Released: November 10, 2017; Label: Dangerous Music, Empire; Format: CD, digital download	—	—

== Video albums ==
Title	Album details	Peak chart positions		
Title	Album details	US	US R&B	US Rap
Pimpin' Incorporated	Released: January 17, 2006; Label: Up All Nite; Format: CD, DVD	80	24	16
The After Party	Released: August 12, 2008; Label: Up All Nite; Format: CD, DVD	—	93	—

== Singles ==
=== As lead artist ===
List of singles as a lead artist, with selected chart positions, showing year released and album name
Title	Year	Peak chart positions				Album
Title	Year	US	US R&B /HH	US Rap	US Rhyth.	Album
"Freaky Tales"	1988	—	—	—	—	Born to Mack
"Life Is...Too Short"	1989	—	43	27	—	Life Is...Too Short
"City of Dope"	1989	—	—	—	—	Life Is...Too Short
"I Ain't Trippin'"	1989	—	—	—	—	Life Is...Too Short
"The Ghetto"	1990	42	12	3	—	Short Dog's in the House
"Short But Funky"	1990	—	36	14	—	Short Dog's in the House
"I Want to Be Free (That's the Truth)"	1992	—	41	5	—	Shorty the Pimp
"In the Trunk"	1992	—	— (Note: "In the Trunk" did not enter the Hot R&B/Hip-Hop Songs chart, but peaked at number eleven on the Bubbling Under R&B/Hip-Hop Singles chart.)	23	—	Shorty the Pimp
"I'm a Player"	1993	85	39	17	—	Get in Where You Fit In
"Money in the Ghetto"	1993	90	64	14	—	Get in Where You Fit In
"Cocktales"	1994	69	43	3	—	Cocktails
"Paystyle"	1995	—	— (Note: "Paystyle" did not enter the Hot R&B/Hip-Hop Songs chart, but peaked at number twelve on the Bubbling Under R&B/Hip-Hop Singles chart.)	29	—	Cocktails
"Gettin' It" (featuring Parliament-Funkadelic)	1996	68	49	9	35	Gettin' It (Album Number Ten)
"Call Me" (with Lil' Kim)	1997	90	41	39	—	Booty Call soundtrack
"More Freaky Tales"	1998	— (Note: "More Freaky Tales" did not enter the Billboard Hot 100, but peaked at number 22 on the Bubbling Under Hot 100 Singles chart.)	50	3	—	Can't Stay Away
"Independence Day" (featuring Keith Murray)	1998	—	91	—	—	Nationwide: Independence Day
"Invasion of the Flat Booty Bitches"	1998	51	41	4	—	Can't Stay Away
"It's About That Money" (featuring Puff Daddy)	1999	—	— (Note: "It's About That Money" did not enter the Hot R&B/Hip-Hop Songs chart, but peaked at number four on the Bubbling Under R&B/Hip-Hop Singles chart.)	—	—	Can't Stay Away
"2 Bitches"	2000	—	54	2	—	You Nasty
"You Nasty"	2000	—	69	6	—	You Nasty
"I Luv"	2001	—	—	—	—	Chase the Cat
"Quit Hatin' Pt. 1" (featuring Twista, V-White and Lil Jon & The East Side Boyz)	2002	—	—	—	—	What's My Favorite Word?
"Choosin" (featuring Jazze Pha and Jagged Edge)	2003	—	61	—	—	Married to the Game
"Shake That Monkey" (featuring Lil Jon & The East Side Boyz)	2003	84	56	23	33	Married to the Game
"Blow the Whistle"	2006	— (Note: "Blow the Whistle" did not enter the Billboard Hot 100, but peaked at number one on the Bubbling Under Hot 100 Singles chart.)	70	21	26	Blow the Whistle
"Keep Bouncin'" (featuring Snoop Dogg, will.i.am and Fergie)	2006	—	93	—	—	Blow the Whistle
"This My One" (featuring E-40)	2008	—	—	—	—	Get off the Stage
"Bitch I'm a Pimp"	2010	—	—	—	—	Respect the Pimpin'
"Money on the Floor" (featuring E-40)	2011	—	—	—	—	No Trespassing
"19,999"	2014	—	—	—	—	19,999: The EP
"Ain't My Girlfriend" (featuring French Montana, Ty Dolla Sign and Jeremih)	2016	—	—	—	—	The Pimp Tape
"—" denotes a recording that did not chart.

=== As featured artist ===
List of singles as a featured artist, with selected chart positions and certifications, showing year released and album name
Title	Year	Peak chart positions									Certifications	Album
Title	Year	US	US R&B /HH	US Rap	US Rhyth.	AUS	CAN	GER	NZ	UK	Certifications	Album
"Rapper's Ball" (E-40 featuring Too Short and K-Ci)	1996	29	19	4	—	—	—	—	—	164		Tha Hall of Game
"Game Over" (Scarface featuring Dr. Dre, Ice Cube and Too Short)	1997	—	73	—	—	—	—	—	—	—		The Untouchable
"Fuck Faces" (Scarface featuring Too Short, Tela and Devin the Dude)	1998	—	— (Note: "Fuck Faces" did not enter the Hot R&B/Hip-Hop Songs chart, but peaked at number 73 on the R&B/Hip-Hop Airplay chart.)	—	—	—	—	—	—	—		My Homies
"From the Ground Up" (E-40 featuring Too Short and K-Ci & JoJo)	1998	—	—	—	—	—	—	—	—	—		The Element of Surprise
"Player's Holiday" (T.W.D.Y. featuring Too Short)	1999	90	38	5	15	—	—	—	—	—		Derty Werk
"Pimpin' Ain't No Illusion" (UGK featuring Kool Ace and Too Short)	1999	—	74	6	—	—	—	—	—	—		Dirty Money
"Bia' Bia'" (Lil Jon & The East Side Boyz featuring Ludacris, Too Short, Big Kap and Chyna Whyte)	2001	94	47	—	—	—	—	—	—	—		Put Yo Hood Up
"Bossy" (Kelis featuring Too Short)	2006	16	11	—	8	18	—	64	15	22	RIAA: 2× Platinum	Kelis Was Here
"Life of da Party" (Snoop Dogg featuring Too Short and Mistah F.A.B.)	2008	— (Note: "Life of da Party" did not enter the Billboard Hot 100, but peaked at number five on the Bubbling Under Hot 100 Singles chart.)	48	14	31	—	—	—	—	—		Ego Trippin'
"Something About This Girl" (Legacy featuring Too Short and Virginia Ashby)	2008	—	— (Note: "Something About This Girl" did not enter the Hot R&B/Hip-Hop Songs chart, but peaked at number two on the Bubbling Under R&B/Hip-Hop Singles chart.)	—	—	—	—	—	—	—		The Trinity
"Dat Baby" (Shawty Putt featuring Too Short and Lil Jon)	2008	—	95	—	38	—	—	—	—	—		Non-album single
"Gone" (Chu featuring Jazze Pha and Too Short)	2010	—	110	—	—	—	—	—	—	—		I Am Nalon & Nalon Is Me
"Bitch" (E-40 featuring Too Short)	2010	—	80	24	—	—	—	—	—	—		Revenue Retrievin': Day Shift
"On My Level" (Wiz Khalifa featuring Too Short)	2011	52	16	10	38	—	96	—	—	—	RIAA: Platinum	Rolling Papers
"First Date" (50 Cent featuring Too Short)	2012	—	48	—	—	—	—	—	—	—		Non-album single
"Girls" (Kid Cudi featuring Too Short)	2013	— (Note: "Girls" did not enter the Billboard Hot 100, but peaked at number three on the Bubbling Under Hot 100 Singles chart.)	37	—	—	—	—	—	—	—		Indicud
"Makin' Papers" (Chuckie featuring Lupe Fiasco, Too Short and Snow tha Product)	2013	—	—	—	—	—	—	—	—	—		Non-album single
"Loyal" (Chris Brown featuring Lil Wayne and French Montana or Too Short or Tyga)	2013	9	4	—	1	42	71	54	19	10	RIAA: 4× Platinum; ARIA: 3× Platinum; BPI: 2× Platinum	X
"Or Nah" (Game featuring Too Short, Problem, AV and Eric Bellinger)	2014	—	59	—	28	—	—	—	—	—		Blood Moon: Year of the Wolf
"Show You the World" (G-Eazy featuring Too Short)	2014	—	—	—	—	—	—	—	—	—		Non-album single
"Fuck with You" (King Lil G featuring Too Short)	2016	—	—	—	—	—	—	—	—	—		Lost in Smoke 2
"Cochino" (Dumbfoundead featuring Too Short)	2016	—	—	—	—	—	—	—	—	—		We Might Die
"Whistle" (Jonn Hart featuring Too Short)	2018	—	—	—	34	—	—	—	—	—		Cross My Hart
"—" denotes a recording that did not chart or was not released in that territory.

== Other charted songs ==
List of other charted songs, with selected chart positions, showing year released and album name
Title	Year	Peak chart positions				Certifications	Album
Title	Year	US	US R&B /HH	US Rap	CAN	Certifications	Album
"Of All Things" (G-Eazy featuring Too Short)	2015	—	— (Note: "Of All Things" did not enter the Billboard Hot R&B/Hip-Hop Songs chart, but peaked at number two on the Bubbling Under R&B/Hip-Hop Songs chart.)	—	—	RIAA: Gold	When It's Dark Out
"Sex Appeal" (Baby Keem featuring Too Short)	2026	69	18	13	88		Casino

== Guest appearances ==
Title	Release	Other artist(s)	Album
"Check Yourself"	1991	D-Nice	To tha Rescue
"Racia"	1992	Pooh-Man, Ant Banks	Funky As I Wanna Be
"Funky As I Wanna Be" (Video Version)	1992	Pooh-Man, Ant Banks	Funky As I Wanna Be
"Only Out to Fuck"	1993	Ant Banks, Goldy, Pooh-Man	Sittin' on Somethin' Phat
"2 Kill a G"	1994	Ant Banks, Spice 1	The Big Badass
"Fuckin' Wit Banks"	1994	Ant Banks, Goldy	The Big Badass
"The Loot"	1994	Ant Banks	The Big Badass
"The Game Is Sold, Not Told"	1994	Goldy	In the Land of Funk
"Sea of Bud"	1995	MC Breed	Big Baller
"Gangstas & Playas"	1995	Seagram	Reality Check
"Hit the Highway"	1996	Mr. 3-2, 8Ball & MJG	The Wicked Buddah Baby
"Never Talk Down"	1996	Rappin' 4-Tay, MC Breed	Off Parole
"Don't Fight the Remix"	1996	Passion, Rappin' 4-Tay, Soul Depot	Baller's Lady
"You Thought"	1996	Snoop Dogg, Soopafly	Tha Doggfather
"4 Tha Hustlas"	1997	Ant Banks, 2Pac, MC Breed	Big Thangs
"Big Thangs"	1997	Ant Banks, Ice Cube	Big Thangs
"True Worldwide Playaz"	1997	D-Shot, Spice 1	Six Figures
"It's a Cold Day"	1997	George Clinton, Belita Woods	Def Jam's How to Be a Player soundtrack
"Real Niggaz"	1997	Jay-Z	In My Lifetime, Vol. 1
"Funkin' Over Nuthin'"	1997	Luniz, Harm	Lunitik Muzik
"Conclusions"	1997	MC Breed	Flatline
"The Game Ain't Rated"	1997	A-Dam-Shame, UGK	Revelations: The Beginning of the End
"Recognise Game"	1997	Spice 1, Ice-T, Kokane	The Black Bossalini
"The World Is Filled..."	1997	The Notorious B.I.G., Puff Daddy, Carl Thomas	Life After Death
"It Might Sound Crazy"	1998	Daz Dillinger	Retaliation, Revenge and Get Back
"Can't Stop"	1998	8Ball & MJG	Lost
"A Week Ago"	1998	Jay-Z	Vol. 2... Hard Knock Life
"Jazzy Hoes"	1998	Jermaine Dupri, 8Ball, YoungBloodZ, Mr. Black	Life in 1472
"Love Jones"	1998	Keith Sweat, Erick Sermon, Playa	Still in the Game
"Keep It Real"	1998	Sylk-E. Fyne	Raw Sylk
"Your Sister"	1998	TQ	They Never Saw Me Coming
"Keep Hustlin"	1998	WC, E-40	The Shadiest One
"Ride Wit Us"	1998	Def Squad	El Niño
"Tastes Like Honey"	1998	V.S.	—N/a
"Ride (Down South)"	1999	Foxy Brown, 8Ball & MJG, Juvenile	Chyna Doll
"Baller Bitch"	1999	Foxy Brown, Pretty Boy	Chyna Doll
"Came in the Door Pimpin"	1999	Dave Hollister	Ghetto Hymns
"Earl That's Yo Life"	1999	E-40	Charlie Hustle: The Blueprint of a Self-Made Millionaire
"Somethin' Bout Pimpin"	1999	JT Money	Pimpin' on Wax
"Ride Wit Us"	1999	Keith Murray, Redman, Erick Sermon	It's a Beautiful Thing
"Rhyme Slow"	1999	Kokane	They Call Me Mr. Kane
"Tricks (Bitches)"	1999	MC Breed, Richie Rich	It's All Good
"Suckas Do What They Can"	1999	Spice 1, Yukmouth, Roger Troutman	Immortalized
"Delinquents Are Back"	1999	The Delinquents	Bosses Will Be Bosses
"Big Booty Hoes"	1999	The Notorious B.I.G.	Born Again
"Time and Money"	1999	Young Bleed	My Own
"Pervin'"	1999	T.W.D.Y., E-40, Otis & Shug	Derty Werk
"Players Holiday"	1999	T.W.D.Y., Mac Mall, Rappin' 4-Tay, Otis & Shug	Derty Werk
"Real Playas"	1999	Rally Boys	Rally World Vol. 1
"Undercover Freaks"	1999	Tear Da Club Up Thugs, T-Rock	CrazyNDaLazDayz
"Pimpin and Jackin"	2000	C-Bo	Enemy of the State
"Doin' The Fool"	2000	E-40, Pimp C, Al Kapone, Pastor Troy	Loyalty and betrayal
"Fat Gold Chain"	2000	Erick Sermon	Erick Onasis
"Luv It How U Get It"	2000	E.S.G.	City Under Siege
"Pimp Or Die"	2000	Mack 10, Techniec	The Paper Route
"In n Out"	2000	Scarface, Devin The Dude	The Last of a Dying Breed
"Lead the Way"	2000	T.W.D.Y., Vidal Prevost	Lead the Way
"Shut Up"	2000	T.W.D.Y., Ice-T, Kokane	Lead the Way
"Game Shooters"	2000	T.W.D.Y., E-40, Mac Shawn	Lead the Way
"Cali 4 Ni Yey"	2000	T.W.D.Y., Vidal Prevost, Otis & Shug	Lead the Way
"So High"	2000	The Click, Kurupt, Bosko	Obstacles Original Motion Picture Soundtrack
"Just A Playa'"	2000	Pimp C, Levitti	Obstacles Original Motion Picture Soundtrack
"Let My Nutts Go"	2001	Lil Jon, Quint Black, Nation Riders	Put Yo Hood Up
"Jazzy Hoes Part 2"	2001	Jermaine Dupri, Kurupt, Field Mob, Backbone, Eddie Cain	—N/a
"Hotel"	2001	T.I.	I'm Serious
"Pimpin Ain't No Illusion"	2001	UGK	Dirty Money
"Somebody Gotta Pimp It"	2001	Keak da Sneak	Hi-Tek
"Die Young"	2001	The Jacka, Husalah	The Jacka Of The Mob Figaz
"Making Good Love (Remix)"	2002	Avant	—N/a
"So International"	2002	B-Legit	Hard 2 B-Legit
"Bitch Bitch Bitch Make Me Rich"	2002	Daz Dillinger	This Is the Life I Lead
"Big Boyz"	2002	King Tee	The Kingdom Come
"Bitch"	2002	Lil Jon, Chyna Whyte	Kings of Crunk
"Pimp Counsel"	2002	Disturbing tha Peace, Lil Fate, Shawnna	Golden Grain
"Dogged Out"	2002	Ol' Dirty Bastard, Big Syke	The Trials and Tribulations of Russell Jones
"Say Bitch"	2002	Richie Rich	Nixon Pryor Roundtree
"Tater Chips"	2002	YZ, El Dorado Red	The Legend Of Floyd Jones
"Cali Girl"	2004	Big Lurch	It's All Bad
"Can't Nobody"	2004	Messy Marv, Lucci	DisoBAYish
"Pimp On"	2004	Twista, 8Ball	Kamikaze
"Who Need a Bitch"	2005	Bun B, Juvenile	Trill
"Oaktown"	2005	Casual, Richie Rich, G-Stack, E-Mac	Smash Rockwell
"I'm N Luv (Wit' a Stripper) 2 (Tha Remix)"	2005	T-Pain, Twista, Pimp C, Paul Wall, R. Kelly, MJG	Rappa Ternt Sanga
"Make It Rain"	2005	D4L, Kool Ace, Sweetz	Down for Life
"Take Your Bitch"	2005	David Banner, Bun B, Jazze Pha	Certified
"No Real G'z (Remix)"	2005	Spice 1, E-40	The Truth
"Tear it Up" (Remix)	2005	Young Jeezy, Lloyd	—N/a
"Lac'n On Dueces"	2005	Deep, C-Note, Jhlame	—N/a
"Yummy" (Remix)	2006	Chelo	—N/a
"Yee"	2006	E-40, Budda	My Ghetto Report Card
"This How We Eat"	2006	Goldie Loc, Kokane, Big Tigger	B.G. 2 O.G.
"Gettin' Some" (Remix)	2006	Shawnna, Lil Wayne, Pharrell, Ludacris	Block Music
"Get Low"	2006	Tyrese, The Dogg Pound, Kurupt	Alter Ego
"Movin In Your Chucks"	2006	Xzibit, Kurupt	Full Circle
"Shake It"	2006	Jody Breeze	Best Kept Secret Vol. 2
"Bills"	2006	Scoundrels	4-Ever Gullie
"Didn't I Tell You"	2007	Keyshia Cole	Just Like You
"Sideshow" (Remix)	2007	Mistah F.A.B., Keak da Sneak	Da Baydestrian
"On Yo' Way"	2007	Mistah F.A.B.	Da Baydestrian
"Goin Crazy"	2007	Mistah F.A.B., Fabo	Da Baydestrian
"Can't Get Enough"	2007	Tha Dogg Pound	Dogg Chit
"Life Is 2009"	2007	UGK	Underground Kingz
"Rippah"	2007	Turf Talk	West Coast Vaccine: The Cure
"Don't Lose Your Head"	2007	Zion I	DJ Fuzz - Mixology 2
"I Want You"	2007	X1, E-40, Suga Free	E Sharp Presents Vol. 2
"Sweat Ya Perm Out"	2007	Katt Williams, Lil Jon, Buddha Early, JT the Bigga Figga, Lil Scrappy, Shawty Putt, Suga Free	—N/a
"Sliding Down the Pole"	2008	E-40	The Ball Street Journal
"Dancer (Is She Really My Girl)"	2008	MC Magic, C. Note, AZ Prince	Magic City Part 2
"The Best Thing Goin"	2008	Yukmouth, Devin the Dude, Richie Rich, Danica "The Morning Star"	Million Dollar Mouthpiece
"Playa Like Me"	2008	Keak Da Sneak, Celly Cel	Deified
"Life of da Party"	2008	Snoop Dogg, Mistah F.A.B.	Ego Trippin'
"Rapp Starr"	2008	B-Legit	Hip Hop Classiks
"Work It"	2008	ProHoeZak	I'm A Boss
"Tipper Love"	2009	DJ Drama, The-Dream, La the Darkman	Gangsta Grillz: The Album (Vol. 2)
"Steal Your Mind"	2009	UGK, Snoop Dogg	UGK 4 Life
"When We're Fucking"	2009	B-Real, Young De, Kurupt	Smoke n Mirrors
"Where It's At"	2009	XVII, Pimp C	The Reason
"I Da Pimp"	2009	Mike Epps, Slim Thug	Funny Bidness: Da Album
"Resume"	2010	E-A-Ski	The Resume
"Bitch"	2010	E-40	Revenue Retrievin': Day Shift
"Can't Stop the Boss"	2010	E-40, Snoop Dogg, Jazze Pha	Revenue Retrievin': Night Shift
"Show Me What You Workin' Wit"	2010	E-40	Revenue Retrievin': Night Shift
"Money Over Bitches"	2010	Fat Joe, TA	The Darkside Vol. 1
"She Wants Me"	2010	Kutt Calhoun, Irv Da Phenom	Raw and Un-Kutt
"Fo Yo Sorrows"	2010	Big Boi, Sam Chris, George Clinton	Sir Lucious Left Foot: The Son of Chico Dusty
"Neighborhood Superstars"	2010	J. Stalin, Mistah F.A.B.	Prenuptial Agreement
"Made 4"	2010	Pimp C	The Naked Soul of Sweet Jones
"She Bad"	2011	Layzie Bone	The Meaning
"Take U Home"	2011	Snoop Dogg, Daz Dillinger, Kokane	Doggumentary
"On Point"	2011	Strong Arm Steady	Arms & Hammers
"Butt2Butt"	2011	Wallpaper.	#STUPiDFACEDD
"Fuck Boy"	2011	Pimp C	Still Pimping
"Milk, Milk, Lemonade"	2011	Dirt Nasty, Warren G	Nasty As I Wanna Be
"Bring It Back (Remix)"	2011	Travis Porter	From Day 1
"Be You"	2012	E-40, J Banks	The Block Brochure: Welcome to the Soil 3
"Over Here"	2012	E-40, Droop-E	The Block Brochure: Welcome to the Soil 3
"First Date"	2012	50 Cent	Street King Immortal
"Break a Bitch"	2012	Tony Yayo	Sex, Drugs, & Hip-Hop
"Pimp"	2012	T.I., Pimp C	Fuck Da City Up
"Welcome To California"	2012	Big Bad 4-0, E-40, Snoop Dogg, Xzibit	New World Agenda
"She the Type"	2012	J. Stalin	Memoirs of a Curb Server
"All That Booty"	2012	Playa Los, Pinky	—N/a
"Take Em Down"	2012	Rico Rossi, Baby Bash	—N/a
"Girls"	2013	Kid Cudi	Indicud
"Do My Dance"	2013	Cassie	RockaByeBaby
"Dejalo (Zondo Remix)"	2013	Rilo Kiley	RKives
"The Compliments"	2013	The Lonely Island	The Wack Album
"V.I.P."	2013	Tony Touch, Xzibit, Kurupt	The Piece Maker 3: Return of the 50 MC's
"R.I.P. (G-Mix)"	2013	Young Jeezy, Snoop Dogg, E-40	—N/a
"1 to 1 Ratio"	2013	Joe	Doubleback: Evolution of R&B
"So Much Pearl In Here"	2013	Mistah F.A.B.	Hella Ratchet
"Bang Her"	2013	Dirt Nasty	Palatial
"Astronaut Pussy / Welcome to California"	2013	The Game, Schoolboy Q, Skeme, Stacy Barthe	OKE: Operation Kill Everything
"Jewels N' Drugs"	2013	Lady Gaga, T.I., Twista	Artpop
"When You Gone Let Me"	2013	E-40	The Block Brochure: Welcome to the Soil 5
"My Bitch"	2013	DB Tha General	I Should've Been Signed
"Wassup"	2013	Problem & IamSu!	Million Dollar Afro
"Break It Down"	2013	Baby Bash, Z-Ro, Clyde Carson	Unsung
"Catz and Dogz"	2013	Big Omeezy, Baby Bash	Freedom of Street
"Go Deep"	2013	Ty Dolla Sign, Berner	—N/a
"For a Week"	2014	Mike Jay, YG	The Mike Jay EP
"9 Lives"	2014	Eric Bellinger, Ty Dolla Sign	The Rebirth
"A.O.B."	2014	Philthy Rich, Pooh Hefner, 4rAx	#NOBFE Vol. 3
"Fuk That"	2014	J. Stalin	S.I.D. Shining In Darkness
"We Put You In The Game"	2014	The Hoodstarz	DJ Drama Presents: 56 Months
"Settle For Less Remix"	2014	Rayven Justice	I Have A Dream
"Panther"	2014	Miki Howard	I Choose to Be Happy
"Sucka"	2014	Rocko	Lingo 4 Dummys
"Real Bitch"	2014	Te Money	—N/a
"Same Since 88"	2014	E-40, B-Legit	Sharp On All 4 Corners: Corner 1
"T.W.D.Y."	2014	IamSu!, E-40	Sincerely Yours
"We Put "Too $hort Intro"	2014	Beeda Weeda	Too $hort Presents: Bass Rock Babies
"Strip Club"	2014	Beeda Weeda, 1.O.A.K.	Too $hort Presents: Bass Rock Babies
"Racked Up"	2014	Beeda Weeda, Gunplay	Too $hort Presents: Bass Rock Babies
"Too $hort Outro"	2014	Beeda Weeda	Too $hort Presents: Bass Rock Babies
"All About Me"	2014	Beeda Weeda	Too $hort Presents: Bass Rock Babies
"Told Me"	2015	A-Wax	Everybody Loves Me 2
"She Bad"	2015	Sons of Funk	The Lost Files Vol. 1
"She All About The Shmoney"	2015	Rowdy Rebel, Bobby Shmurda	—N/a
"WTC"	2015	Schoolboy Q, The Game	Schoolboy Q 2
"Saturday"	2015	Warren G, E-40, Nate Dogg	Regulate... G Funk Era, Pt. II
"Don't Stop"	2016	Snoop Dogg	Coolaid
"Black Hollywood"	2016	Mistah F.A.B., Snoop Dogg, Bobby V	Son of a Pimp Part 2
"MY$Tery"	2016	Ymtk	All the Right Places
"2 Hands"	2016	The Mekanix, Richie Rich, E-40, Loverboi	Under the Hood
"Hustle Hard"	2016	Cold 187um, E-40, SClassic	The Black Godfather
"Do 4 It"	2016	Sexton	—N/a
"Doin' Too Much"	2016	Cals	—N/a
"Toss Me"	2017	Snoop Dogg, Nef the Pharaoh	Neva Left
"Excuse Me"	2017	Mozzy, Yhung T.O.	Legendary Gangland
"Mobbin'"	2017	Adrian Marcel, Boosie Badazz, M-City Jr.	GMFU
"Bottle After Bottle"	2017	Yukmouth, E-40, Trevell, Winn-Wade	JJ Based on a Vill Story Two
"Chose Up (Remix)"	2017	Semi Auto Cec	Far from a Square
"What's Yo Name"	2017	FASHION The Rapper	—N/a
"Oh Shante"	2017	Alekesam	—N/a
"Idfwu"	2018	Rayven Justice	Wavy Justice 2
"Busy Body"	2018	Berner, E-40, TeeFLii	The Big Pescado
"Innocent"	2018	DecadeZ	Good Vibe Music
"Ain't Got No Haters"	2018	Ice Cube	Everythang's Corrupt
"Right Now (Remix)"	2018	Philthy Rich, E-40, Ziggy	The Remixes 2
"Weekend"	2018	Compton AV, Iamsu!, Jonn Hart & WestCoast Esco	Still Thuggin
"Whistle"	2018	Jonn Hart, Juelz Santana	—N/a
"Viral"	2018	S. Loyal	—N/a
"Lit"	2018	Westside Mcfly, Beep Beep, Finess	—N/a
"Come Here"	2018	Money B & Young Hump, 4rAx	—N/a
"G.Y.M."	2019	M.I.T.C.H.	Girl Power
"Undrunk"	2020	Chris Brown, E-40	Slime & B
"Ca$hland"	2021	YBN Nahmir, E-40	Visionland
"Sex Appeal"	2026	Baby Keem	Ca$ino
