= Mack of the Century... Too Short's Greatest Hits =

Mack of the Century... Too $hort's Greatest Hits

Greatest hits album by Too $hort
- Released: November 28, 2006
- Recorded: 1987–2003
- Genre: Gangsta rap, old school
- Label: Jive Records

Mack of the Century... Too $hort's Greatest Hits is a compilation of the hits by rapper Too $hort.

== Track listing ==
#	Song	Year	Featured guest(s)	Original Album
1	"Freaky Tales"	1987		Born to Mack
2	"Dope Fiend Beat"	1987		Born to Mack
3	"Life Is... Too Short"	1988		Life Is...Too Short
4	"I Ain't Trippin'"	1988		Life Is...Too Short
5	"$hort but Funky"	1990		Short Dog's in the House
6	"The Ghetto"	1990		Short Dog's in the House
7	"I'm a Player"	1993		Get in Where You Fit In
8	"Blowjob Betty"	1993		Get in Where You Fit In
9	"In the Trunk"	1992		Shorty the Pimp
10	"Burn Rubber"	2003	DJ NVS Stylz	Married to the Game
11	"Cocktales"	1995		Cocktails
12	"Gettin' It"	1996	Parliament	Gettin' It
13	"Choosin'"	2003	Jagged Edge, Jazze Pha	Married to the Game
