= Greatest Hits, Vol. 1: The Player Years, 1983–1988 =

1993 compilation album by Too Short

Greatest hits album by Too Short
- Released: November 10, 1993
- Recorded: 1983–1988
- Genre: Gangsta rap
- Label: In-A-Minute
- Producer: Too Short

Too Short chronology
Get in Where You Fit In (1993)	Greatest Hits, Vol. 1: The Player Years, 1983–1988 (1993)	Cocktails (1995)

Professional ratings
Review scores
Source	Rating
AllMusic	4.5/5 stars

Greatest Hits, Vol. 1: The Player Years, 1983–1988 is a double disc that contains some of the contents of Too Short's first CDs ever, recorded locally in the Bay Area around 1983–1986. All these tracks come from the pre-N.W.A era, when West Coast still had not established its sound. The album contains all of the songs featured on Don't Stop Rappin', Players and Raw, Uncut, and X-Rated, all of which have not been reissued.

== Track listing ==
Disc 1

#	Title
1.	"Invasion of the Flat Booty Bitches"
2.	"She's a Bitch"
3.	"The Bitch Sucks Dick"
4.	"Short Side/Blowjob Betty"
5.	"Short Side"
6.	"Playboy Short"
7.	"From Here to New York"
8.	"Girl (Cocaine) That's Your Life"
9.	"Coke Dealers"
10.	"Female Funk"

Disc 2

#	Title
1.	"Oakland, California"
2.	"Don't Stop Rappin'"
3.	"Shortrapp"
4.	"Wild, Wild West"
5.	"Every Time"
6.	"Dance (Don't Geek)"
7.	"Don't Ever Stop" (feat. Mc Jah)
8.	"Players"
