= Blow the whistle =

Blow the whistle may refer to:

- Blow the Whistle (album), a 2006 album by Too Short
  - "Blow the Whistle" (song)
- refereeing a sports match
- Whistleblowing, reporting inappropriate activity to outsiders
