= Bible of a Pimp =

Compilation album by Too Short
- Released: April 17, 2007
- Genres: West Coast Hip hop; hyphy; dirty rap
- Labels: Jive Records, Up All Nite
- Producers: Lil Jon, Jazze Pha, will.i.am

Too Short chronology
Blow the Whistle (2006)	Bible of a Pimp (2007)	I Love the Bay (2007)

Bible of a Pimp is a compilation album by Too Short. It is a 2002 rerelease of his independent CDs from 1983 & 85 with a bonus DVD.

== Track list ==
=== Disc 1 ===
1. Invasion of the Flat Booty Bitches
2. She's a Bitch
3. Bitch Sucks Dick
4. Blowjob Betty
5. Short Side
6. Playboy Short
7. From Here to New York
8. Girl (That's Your Life)
9. Coke Dealers

=== Disc 2 ===
1. Female Funk
2. Oakland California
3. Don't Stop Rappin
4. Shortrapp
5. Wild Wild West
6. Every Time
7. Dance (Don't Geek)
8. Don't Ever Stop
9. Players
