= Snoop Cube 40 $hort =

Studio album by Mount Westmore
- Released: December 9, 2022
- Genre: West Coast hip-hop; gangsta rap; trap
- Label: MNRK
- Producer: Mount Westmore (exec.); Ant Banks; Big Zeke; DecadeZ; Dem Jointz; Droop-E; EJ Galloway; Jelly Roll; Jenn Em; Kato; P. Keys; P-Lo; Prohoezak; Rick Rock; ShawnSki; Soopafly; Uncle Chucc; We Got Hits Productions

Snoop Dogg chronology
| Gangsta Grillz : I Still Got It (2022) | Snoop Cube 40 $hort (2022) | Missionary (2024) |

Ice Cube chronology
| Everythang's Corrupt (2018) | Snoop Cube 40 $hort (2022) | Man Down (2024) |

E-40 chronology
| Practice Makes Paper (2019) | Snoop Cube 40 $hort (2022) | Rule of Thumb: Rule 1 (2023) |

Too $hort chronology
| The Vault (2019) | Snoop Cube 40 $hort (2022) | Sir Too $hort Vol. 1 (Freaky Tales) (2025) |

Singles from Snoop Cube 40 $hort
- 1. "Big Subwoofer" Released: October 20, 2021; 2. "Too Big" Released: October 21, 2022

Snoop Cube 40 $hort is the debut studio album by American West Coast hip-hop supergroup Mount Westmore. It was initially released via blockchain mid-2022 and later released on streaming services on December 9, 2022, by MNRK Music Group, and included unreleased tracks that were not featured on the original version. Production was handled by several record producers, including Rick Rock, Ant Banks, Soopafly and Droop-E. It features a guest appearance from P-Lo.

The album was supported with two singles: "Big Subwoofer", which previously appeared on 2021 compilation album Snoop Dogg Presents Algorithm, and "Too Big".

== Critical reception ==
Professional ratings
Aggregate scores
| Source | Rating |
|---|---|
| Metacritic | 66/100 |
Review scores
| Source | Rating |
| AllMusic | 3.5/5 stars |
| Distorted Sound | 8/10 |
| HipHopDX | 3/5 |
| Metal Hammer | 3.5/5 stars |
| NME | 3/5 stars |
| Pitchfork | 6.5/10 |
| The Observer | 2/5 stars |

At Metacritic, which assigns a normalized rating out of 100 to reviews from mainstream publications, the album received an average score of 66, based on five reviews.

== Commercial performance ==
The album peaked at number 188 on the US Billboard 200.

== Track listing ==
| No. | Title | Writer(s) | Producer(s) | Length |
|---|---|---|---|---|
| 1. | "California" | Earl Stevens; Todd Shaw; O'Shea Jackson; Calvin Broadus; Ricardo Thomas | Rick Rock | 3:15 |
| 2. | "Motto" | Stevens; Shaw; Jackson; Broadus; Thomas | Rick Rock | 3:38 |
| 3. | "Big Subwoofer" | Stevens; Shaw; Jackson; Broadus; Chris Ju; Patrick John Kesack | Kato; P. Keys | 3:39 |
| 4. | "Too Big" (featuring P-Lo) | Stevens; Shaw; Jackson; Broadus; Paolo Rodriguez | P-Lo | 3:36 |
| 5. | "Activated" | Stevens; Shaw; Jackson; Broadus; Shawn Johnson | ShawnSki; We Got Hits Productions | 3:59 |
| 6. | "Have a Nice Day" | Stevens; Shaw; Jackson; Broadus | Dem Jointz; Jenn Em | 5:03 |
| 7. | "Ghetto Gutter" | Stevens; Shaw; Jackson; Broadus; Anthony Banks; Earl Stevens Jr. | Ant Banks; Droop-E | 3:41 |
| 8. | "Free Game" | Stevens; Shaw; Jackson; Broadus; Arcale Turner | DecadeZ | 3:51 |
| 9. | "I Got Pull" | Stevens; Shaw; Jackson; Broadus; Simon McKinley; Kevin Duane McCord | ProHoeZak | 3:30 |
| 10. | "Up & Down" | Stevens; Shaw; Jackson; Broadus; Turner | DecadeZ | 4:34 |
| 11. | "Do My Best" | Stevens; Shaw; Jackson; Broadus; Priest Brooks | Uncle Chucc | 4:29 |
| 12. | "Lace You Up" | Stevens; Shaw; Jackson; Broadus | Soopafly | 4:15 |
| 13. | "Tribal" | Stevens; Shaw; Jackson; Broadus | Jelly Roll | 3:59 |
| 14. | "How Many" | Stevens; Shaw; Jackson; Broadus | Ant Banks; Big Zeke | 4:21 |
| 15. | "On Camera" | Stevens; Shaw; Jackson; Broadus | Rick Rock | 4:34 |
| 16. | "Mash" | Stevens; Shaw; Jackson; Broadus; EJ Galloway | EJ Galloway | 4:33 |
| Total length: | | | | 65:00 |

== Charts ==
| Chart (2022) | Peak position |
|---|---|
| US Billboard 200 | 188 |
| US Top Album Sales (Billboard) | 54 |
| US Independent Albums (Billboard) | 24 |
