= Short But Funky =

Single by Too Short

from the album Short Dog's in the House
- Released: 1990
- Genre: Hip hop
- Length: 4:13
- Label: Jive
- Songwriters: Dame Edwards, Keenan Foster
- Producer: Keenan Foster

Too Short singles chronology
"The Ghetto" (1990)	"Short But Funky" (1990)	"I Want to be Free (That's the Truth)" (1992)

"Short But Funky" is a song by American rapper Too Short, released in 1990 by Jive Records as the lead single from his album Short Dog's in the House (1990). It is based on a sample of the song "High" by American funk band Skyy.

In contrast to the rapper's previous works, "Short But Funky" is devoid of any profanity or violent lyrical content. It was produced by Keenan Foster, who co-wrote the song with Dame "Dangerous" Edwards in an attempt to embody a more light-hearted, radio-friendly aesthetic, as well as to allow Too Short to perform in a different flow and adopt unfamiliar subject matter.

The song peaked at number 36 on the Hot R&B/Hip-Hop Singles & Tracks chart, and at number 14 on the Hot Rap Songs chart. Considered one of Too Short's more popular songs, it was re-released in 2006 on Mack of the Century... Too Short's Greatest Hits.

== Track listing ==
- US 12" vinyl
1. "Short But Funky" (Radio Version) (4:13)
2. "Short But Funky" (Hula & K Fingers Remix) (3:41)
3. "Short But Funky" (Extended Remix) (5:30)
4. "Life Is... Too Short" (Live in Oakland 1990) (3:48)
5. "Short But Funky" (Instrumental) (4:39)

== Chart Positions ==
Chart	Position
Hot R&B/Hip-Hop Singles & Tracks	# 36
Hot Rap Singles	# 14
