= Mac Minister =

American rapper (born 1971)

- Born: Andre Dow; November 18, 1971
- Origin: San Francisco, California, U.S.
- Genre: Hip hop
- Occupation: Rapper
- Years active: 1993–2005
- Label: SMC Records

Andre Dow (known by his stage name Mac Minister) is an American former rapper.

Mac Minister was profiled on an episode of America's Most Wanted, allegedly responsible for the murder of Anthony "Fat Tone" Watkins in Las Vegas, Nevada, in retaliation for the murder of Bay Area rapper Mac Dre. After a 10-month manhunt, Dow was apprehended on the evening of March 2, 2006, while hiding out in a San Francisco apartment, becoming AMW Direct Result Capture #879.

Mac Minister is from the Fillmore District of San Francisco, California, a neighborhood also known as "The Fillmore", "FILLMOE", and "the Moe". He lived in the Marcus Garvey/Martin Luther King Jr. housing complex. His apartment was entered in two police raids in 1999, one in which his pit bull was shot and killed by the police officers.

== Homicide charges ==
Dow was convicted along with his friend Jason "Corleone" Mathis of two counts of first-degree murder and two counts of conspiracy to commit murder. The trial lasted less than a week. Both men received sentences of life without parole.

The bodies of the victims were later found riddled with AK-47 bullets at a construction site outside of Las Vegas. MGM Grand security cameras documented Dow leaving the hotel with two men just hours before the murder.

Police immediately sought to question him, but Dow fled, prompting a 10-month manhunt. The case was featured prominently on America's Most Wanted before Dow's capture on March 2, 2006.

He was sentenced to life in prison without the possibility of parole on July 31, 2008.

== New trial ==
On June 8, 2022, court documents were published online revealing that Dow had been granted a new trial. This was after a key prosecution witness against Dow by the name of Antione Mouton, recanted his testimony, stating that he made statements incriminating Dow in exchange for receiving favorable treatment for his own pending criminal cases.. The following year it was reported that the 2008 judgement was upheld. As of 2026, Dow still remains in prison.

== Discography ==
=== Albums ===
- 2006: The Minister of Defense

=== Appearances ===
- 1994: Mac Minister featuring Mac Mall "West Coast"
- 1995: Mac Minister featuring Little Bruce & B-Legit "Rap Star"
- 1996: E-40 featuring Mac Minister "Mack Minister (Interlude)"
- 1999: Frost featuring B-Legit, Richie Rich & Mac Minister "Heart Of A Savage"
- 2000: Snoop Dogg featuring Mac Minister "Game Court"
- 2001: Turk featuring Mac Minister "Seattle Slew" (Skit) & "Police" (Skit)
- 2002: Yukmouth featuring Mac Minister "Fuck Friends"
- 2003: Ras Kass featuring Scipio, Donna Karin, 40 Glocc & Mac Minister "Don't Ask Me"
- 2006: Mac Minister "Fuck The Law"
- 2006: Mac Minister featuring Mac Dre "The Treal Man"
- 2006: The Game featuring Mac Minister "Lookin At You"
- 2010: Too Short featuring Richie Rich & Mac Minister "Ya'll Ready"
