= Big Subwoofer =

Single by Mount Westmore

from the album Algorithm and Snoop Cube 40 $hort
- Released: October 20, 2021
- Genre: West Coast hip-hop; trap
- Length: 4:01
- Label: Def Jam
- Songwriters: Earl Stevens; Todd Shaw; O'Shea Jackson; Calvin Broadus; Chris Ju; Patrick John Kesack
- Producers: Kato; P. Keys

Mount Westmore singles chronology
"Big Subwoofer" (2021)	"Too Big" (2022)

Music video
- "Big Subwoofer" on YouTube

"Big Subwoofer" is the debut single by American West Coast hip-hop supergroup Mount Westmore, consisting of rappers Snoop Dogg, E-40, Too Short, and Ice Cube. The song was made available at the iTunes Music Store on October 20, 2021. The song was produced by Kato and P. Keys. "Big Subwoofer" was released lead single from Snoop Dogg's compilation album, Snoop Dogg Presents Algorithm (2021) and as lead single from the group debut album Snoop Cube 40 $hort (2022).

== Background ==
The song was performed live for the first time on the night of April 17, 2021, during the showdown between YouTuber Jake Paul and ex-MMA fighter Ben Askren in Triller's latest Fight Club match.

== Music video ==
On October 20, 2021, the video from "Big Subwoofer" was released on Snoop Dogg's YouTube account. The video features the four legendary rappers heading to another planet on a spaceship, Snoop Dogg is the pilot, while Ice Cube is the shooter, the video was directed by Jesse Wellens and Sam Macaroni features everything from blue aliens to an appearance from the Dogecoin mascot Shiba Inu.

== Commercial performance ==
The song debuted and peaked at number 44 on the US Billboard Digital Songs, being the forty-fourth best-selling song of the week. "Big Subwoofer" spent twenty weeks on the Rhythmic Airplay chart, peaking at number twenty, becoming the group's longest-running song on the chart. The song debuted at number-one on the Billboard's Top Triller US and Top Triller Global on the chart dated November 6, 2021, marking the group's first number one song on the charts.

== Track listing ==
- Digital download and streaming
1. "Big Subwoofer" (single version) – 4:01

== Charts ==
Chart performance for "Big Subwoofer"
Chart (2021)	Peak position
New Zealand Hot Singles (RMNZ)	16
US Digital Song Sales (Billboard)	44
US R&B/Hip-Hop Digital Songs (Billboard)	7
US Rap Digital Songs (Billboard)	5
US Rhythmic Airplay (Billboard)	19
