= The Pimp Tape =

2018 album by Too Short

Studio album by Too $hort
- Released: November 9, 2018
- Genre: Hip hop
- Label: Dangerous Music; EMPIRE
- Producer: Too $hort (also exec.); Ishtrumentals; Drumma Boy; Kevin Allen; Ekzakt; VT; Zaytoven; Traxamillion; Helluva; P-Lo; Big Kory; Lil' Jon; Jay Nari

Too $hort chronology
No Trespassing (2012)	The Pimp Tape (2018)	The Vault (2019)

Singles from The Pimp Tape
- 1. "Ain't My Girlfriend" Released: August 23, 2018

Professional ratings
Review scores
Source	Rating
HipHopDX	3.6/5

The Pimp Tape is the twentieth solo studio album by American rapper Too $hort. It was released on November 9, 2018 through Dangerous Music and EMPIRE. The album features guest appearances from 2 Chainz, Adrian Marcel, Chanel West Coast, DJ Khaled, E-40, French Montana, G-Eazy, Jeremih, Joyner Lucas, Legado 7, Mistah F.A.B., Mozzy, Nef the Pharaoh, Philthy Rich, Richie Rich, Schoolboy Q, Snoop Dogg, T.I., The-Dream, Ty Dolla Sign and YMTK.

== Track listing ==
No.	Title	Producer(s)	Length
1.	"Go $hort Dog"	Ishtrumentals	3:44
2.	"Break a Bitch"	Traxamillion	2:29
3.	"Tables" (featuring 2 Chainz and Snoop Dogg)	Drumma Boy	3:58
4.	"Ain't My Girlfriend" (featuring Ty Dolla $ign, French Montana, Joyner Lucas, and Jeremih)	Drumma Boy	4:33
5.	"Give Her Some Money"	Helluva	2:54
6.	"Save All That Love" (featuring Mozzy, Mistah F.A.B., and Nef the Pharaoh)	P-Lo	3:32
7.	"How to Be a Player" (featuring T.I., E-40, and Adrian Marcel)	Kevin Allen	3:59
8.	"Pull Yo Trophies Out" (featuring Philthy Rich)	Ekzakt	3:30
9.	"Don't Shoot" (featuring ScHoolboy Q and Joyner Lucas)	VT	4:13
10.	"Dr. Dre Interlude"		0:24
11.	"The Game Taught Me"	Zaytoven	3:03
12.	"Give Me Back My Eyes" (featuring YMTK)	Big Kory	3:42
13.	"Only Dimes" (featuring G-Eazy and The-Dream)	Ekzakt	2:46
14.	"Twerk Train" (featuring Chanel West Coast)	Lil Jon	2:35
15.	"Sexy Dancer" (featuring Legado 7 and DJ Khaled)	VT	3:46
16.	"I Got Shit to Do"	Ishtrumentals	3:03
17.	"Pay Her"	Zaytoven	4:23
18.	"$hort Dog Wedding"	Too $hort	2:14
19.	"Pop That Pussy"	Jay Nari	3:15
20.	"How to Be a Player (Reprise)" (featuring T.I., Richie Rich, and Adrian Marcel)	Kevin Allen	3:59

== Chart history ==
Chart (2018)	Peak position
US Independent Albums (Billboard)	15
US Top Album Sales (Billboard)	89
