= Respect the Pimpin' =

EP by Too Short
- Released: December 14, 2010
- Recorded: 2010
- Genre: West Coast hip hop
- Labels: Dangerous Music, Empire

Too Short chronology
Still Blowin' (2010)	Respect the Pimpin' (2010)	No Trespassing (2012)

Singles from Respect the Pimpin'
- 1. "Bitch I'm a Pimp" Released: December 2010

Professional ratings
Review scores
Source	Rating
RapReviews	(7/10)

Respect the Pimpin' is the first EP by American rapper Too Short. The EP contains mostly themes of pimping. It was released on December 14, 2010, by Dangerous Music and Empire Distribution. The project was released solely digital like his 2010 album Still Blowin'.

== Singles ==
The song "Bitch I'm a Pimp" was released to the internet before the EP's release to generate interest and promote it.

== Track listing ==
No.	Title	Producer(s)	Length
1.	"Bitch I'm a Pimp"		3:16
2.	"Respect the Pimpin'" (featuring Snoop Dogg, Silk-E, Elijah Baker)		2:56
3.	"That's Not Your Bitch" (featuring Jazze Pha, Ginger)	Jazze Pha	3:31
4.	"Get Ya Money"		4:57
5.	"Ya'll Ready" (featuring Mac Minister, Richie Rich)		3:52
6.	"Bitches Need Love Too" (featuring Jazze Pha)	Jazze Pha	5:05
