= 2AM (Adrian Marcel song) =

Single by Adrian Marcel featuring Sage the Gemini
- Released: February 4, 2014
- Recorded: 2013
- Genre: Hip hop; R&B
- Length: 3:57
- Label: Republic
- Songwriters: Chrishan; Kyle Coleman; Anthony Franks; Sage the Gemini; Adrian Marcel
- Producer: Chrishan

Adrian Marcel singles chronology
"2AM" (2014)	"Wake Up" (2014)

Sage the Gemini singles chronology
"Only That Real" (2014)	"2AM" (2014)	"G.D.F.R." (2014)

Music video
- "2AM" on YouTube

"2AM" (stylized as "2AM.") is a song by American singer Adrian Marcel. It was released on February 4, 2014, as his commercial debut single. The song features a guest verse from California-based rapper Sage the Gemini and was produced by Chrishan.

== Composition ==
According to Ryan Dombal of Pitchfork, the beat of "2AM" consists of four synth notes with "standard-grade ratchet drums".

== Music video ==
The music video for the song was directed by Martín Estévez and premiered via Marcel's Vevo channel on May 2, 2014.

== Charts ==
Chart (2014)	Peak position
US Bubbling Under Hot 100 (Billboard)	4
US Hot R&B/Hip-Hop Songs (Billboard)	29

== Certifications ==
Region	Certification	Certified units/sales
New Zealand (RMNZ)	Platinum	30,000^{‡}
United States (RIAA)	Gold	500,000^{‡}
^{‡} Sales+streaming figures based on certification alone.
