= Shake That Monkey =

Single by Too Short featuring Lil Jon & the East Side Boyz

from the album Married to the Game
- Released: July 22, 2003
- Recorded: 2003
- Genre: Crunk; hip-hop; dirty rap
- Length: 4:40
- Label: Jive
- Songwriters: Todd Shaw; Jonathan Smith
- Producer: Lil Jon

Too Short singles chronology
"Choosin" (2003)	"Shake That Monkey" (2003)	"Blow the Whistle" (2006)

Lil Jon singles chronology
"Damn!" (2003)	"Shake That Monkey" (2003)	"Salt Shaker" (2003)

Audio
- "Shake That Monkey" on YouTube

"Shake That Monkey" is a song by American rapper Too Short, released by Jive Records on July 22, 2003 as the lead single from his fifteenth album, Married to the Game. It features a guest appearance from hip-hop trio Lil Jon & the East Side Boyz, the former of whom also handled the song's production.

"Shake That Monkey" peaked at number 84 on the Billboard Hot 100, and remains Too Short's final entry on the chart as a lead artist.

== Track listing ==
- US CD:
  1. "Shake That Monkey" (clean) — 4:40
  2. "Shake That Monkey" (explicit) — 4:40
- US 12-inch:
  - A1. "Shake That Monkey" (explicit) — 4:40
  - A2. "Shake That Monkey" (clean) — 4:40
  - B1. "Shake That Monkey" (instrumental) — 4:40
  - B2. "Shake That Monkey" (a capella) — 4:40

== Credits and personnel ==
Information from the vinyl single:

- Producer: Lil Jon
- Executive producer: Todd Shaw
- Recording engineers: Ray Seay, John Frye, Asif Ali, and Ryan Dorn
- Audio mixer: Ray Seay
- Audio mastering: Chaz Harper

== Charts ==
Chart (2004)	Peak position
US Billboard Hot 100	84
US Hot R&B/Hip-Hop Songs (Billboard)	56
US Hot Rap Songs (Billboard)	23
US Rhythmic Airplay (Billboard)	33
