= Mount Westmore =

American hip hop supergroup

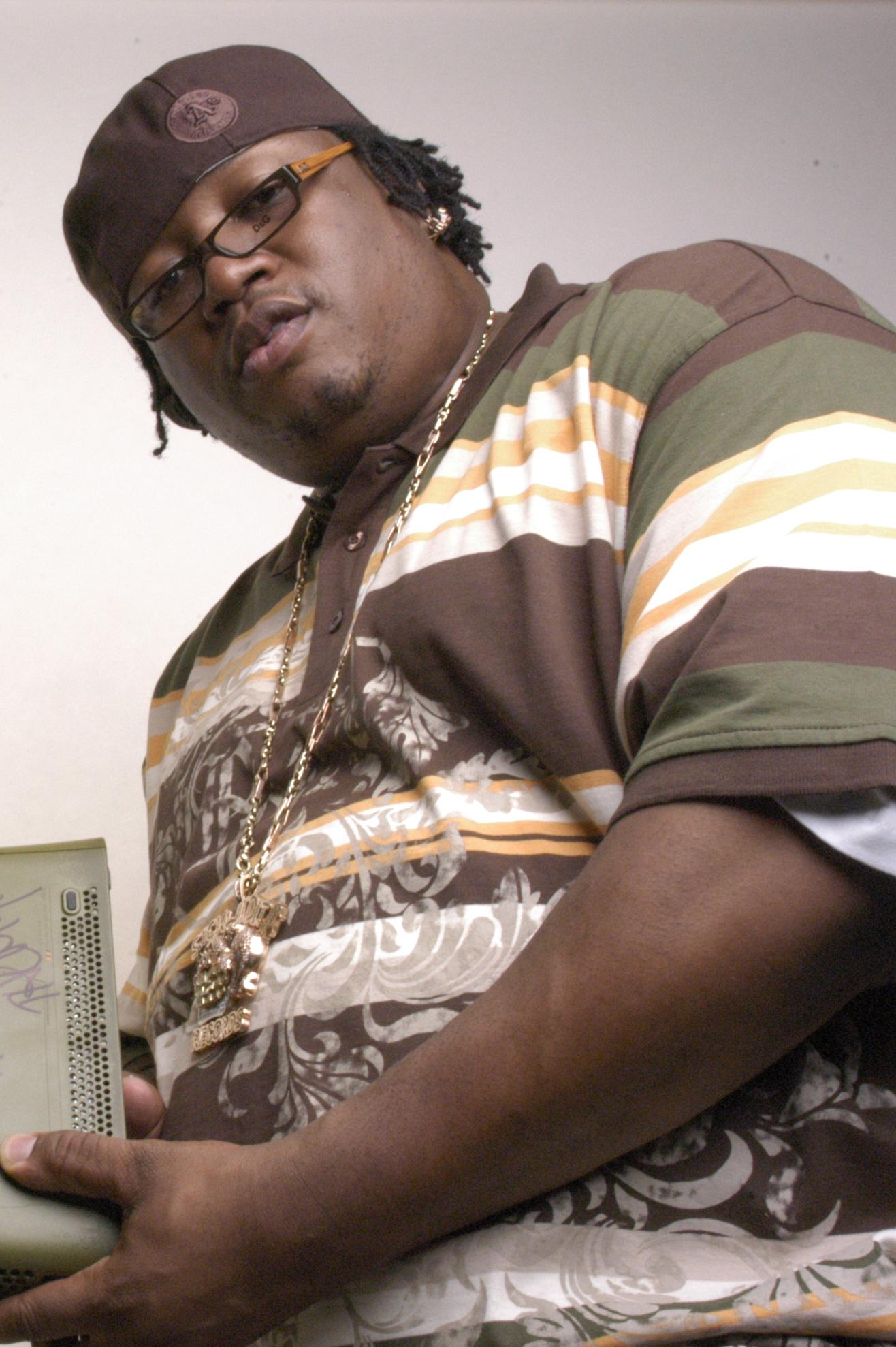
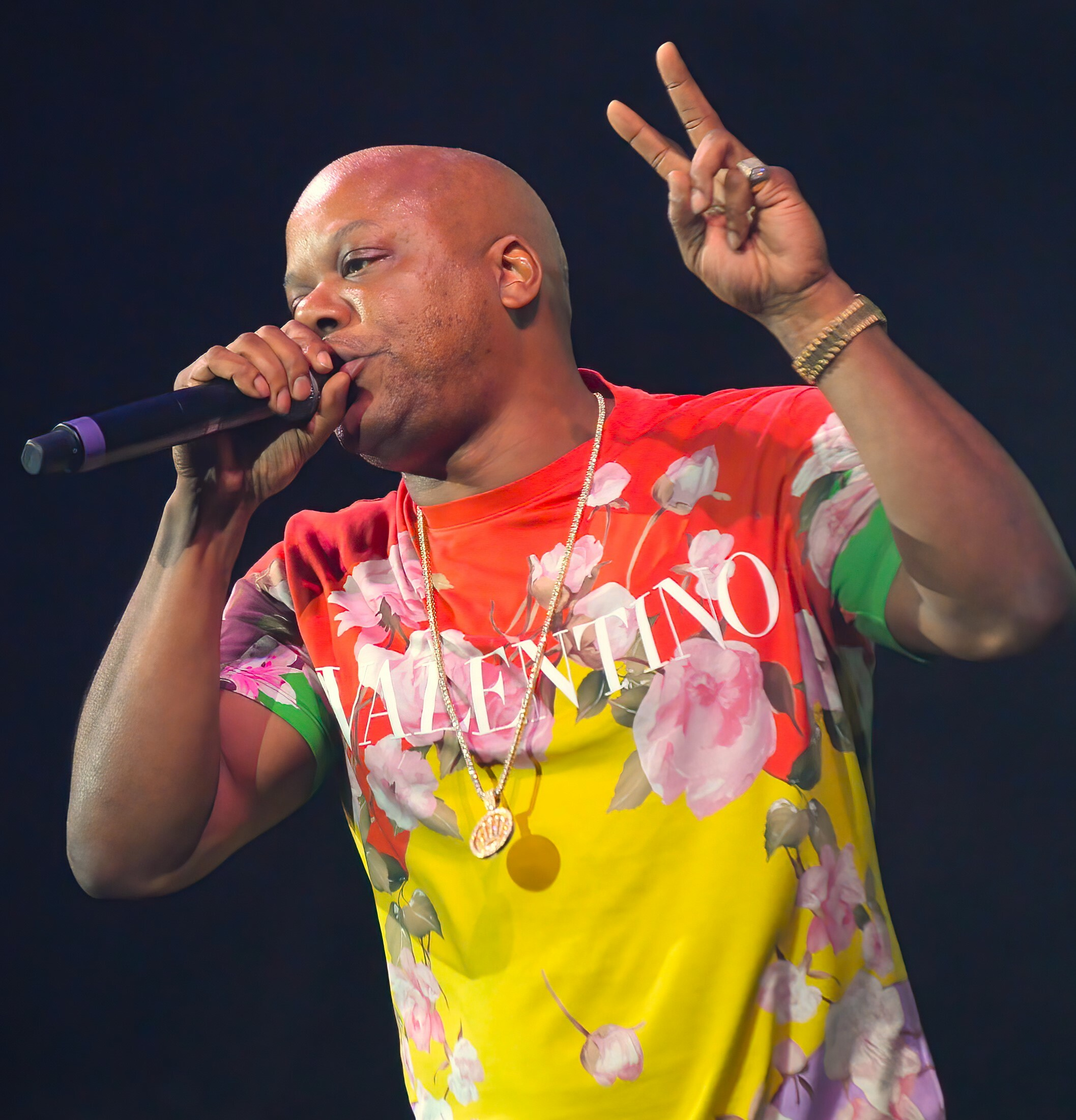
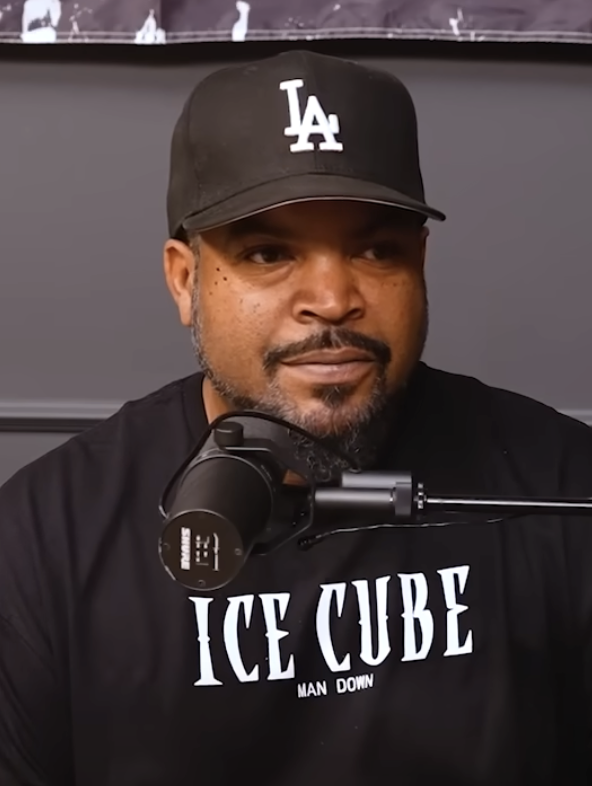
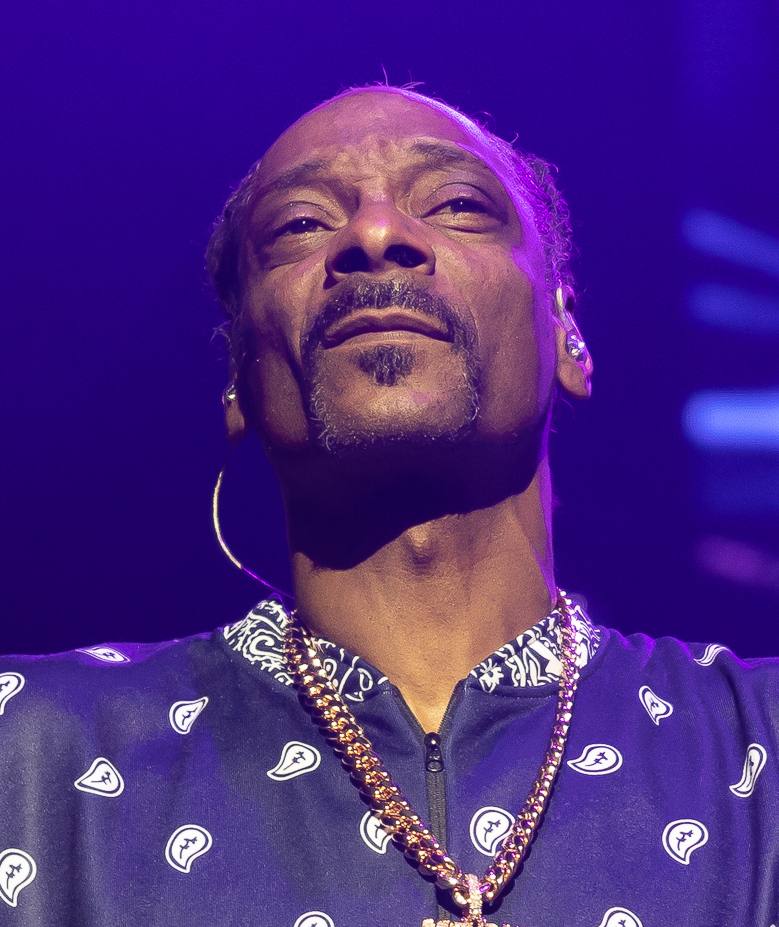
- Clockwise from top: E-40, Too Short, Snoop Dogg, Ice Cube

Background information
- Origin: California, U.S.
- Genres: West Coast hip-hop
- Years active: 2020–present
- Labels: Def Jam; MNRK
- Members: E-40; Too Short; Ice Cube; Snoop Dogg

Mount Westmore is an American hip-hop supergroup composed of California-based rappers Snoop Dogg, E-40, Too Short, and Ice Cube. Formed in late 2020, the group's debut album, Bad MF's (2022) was initially released through blockchain. It was then released to streaming services under the title Snoop Cube 40 $hort on December 9, 2022; this version included several bonus tracks.

== History ==
Members Too Short and E-40 have been releasing collaborative songs since the mid-1990s, with their debut collaborative albums History: Function Music and History: Mob Music being released in 2012. Creation of a supergroup was in discussion shortly thereafter, but never came to fruition until December 2020.

In a 2021 interview with DJ Vlad, Too Short stated that the group's debut album would be followed up with "volumes", similar in style to his release of The Pimp Tape (2018). In April 2021, the group performed a song titled "Big Subwoofer" at the Jake Paul vs. Ben Askren fight. The song was officially released on October 20, 2021, alongside its music video for Snoop Dogg's Def Jam debut compilation Snoop Dogg Presents Algorithm.

On October 11, Ice Cube announced the "Too Big" single release date which came out on October 21. Their debut album, titled Snoop Cube 40 $hort, officially released on December 9, 2022 on all digital platforms with a CD release to follow.

== Discography ==
=== Studio albums ===
List of studio albums, with release date, label and chart position shown
Title	Album details	Peak chart positions
Title	Album details	US
Snoop Cube 40 $hort	Released: December 9, 2022; Label: MNRK, Mount Westmore; Formats: CD, digital download, streaming	188

=== Singles ===
List of singles, with year released, selected chart positions, and album name shown
Title	Year	Peak chart positions	Album
Title	Year	NZ Hot	Album
"Big Subwoofer"	2021	16	Snoop, Cube, 40, $hort
"Too Big [with P-LO]"	2022	3	Snoop, Cube, 40, $hort
