= Still Blowin' =

Studio album by Too Short
- Released: April 6, 2010
- Recorded: 2008–2010
- Genre: Hip hop
- Length: 44:48
- Label: Dangerous Music; EMI
- Producer: Too Short; Jazze Pha; Lil Jon; Vincent "VT" Tolan; John G

Too Short chronology
| Get off the Stage (2007) | Still Blowin' (2010) | Respect the Pimpin' (2010) |

Still Blowin' is the eighteenth studio album by American rapper Too Short. It was released on April 6, 2010 via Too Short's independent label Dangerous Music. The album features guest appearances by Birdman, and Jazze Pha, among others.

== Background ==
The album is available online only. Lil Jon was originally supposed to be featured on the album, but did not make the final cut although he still produced for the album.

== Reception ==
Professional ratings
Review scores
| Source | Rating |
|---|---|
| HipHopDX | 3.5/5 stars |
| RapReviews | (5/10) |

=== Critical reception ===
HipHopDX gave the album a 3.5 out of 5 rating calling the album "one of Too Short's best." Other critics did not receive Too $hort's album as kindly, however.

=== Commercial performance ===
The album appeared on one chart, the Billboard Top R&B/Hip-Hop Albums, peaking at number 70. It was the only week that the album was on any chart.

== Track listing ==
| No. | Title | Producer(s) | Length |
|---|---|---|---|
| 1. | "Maggot Brain" (featuring Silk E) | | 3:52 |
| 2. | "I'm Gone" | | 3:54 |
| 3. | "I Want That" | | 2:57 |
| 4. | "Fed Up" (featuring Kool Ace) | | 3:35 |
| 5. | "Player Card" (featuring Shanell) | | 4:37 |
| 6. | "Still Blowin'" | Too Short | 4:15 |
| 7. | "All for Love" (featuring Town Bizness) | | 3:24 |
| 8. | "I'm a Pimp" (featuring Earl Hayes) | | 3:43 |
| 9. | "Checking My Hoes" (featuring Birdman and Jazze Pha) | Jazze Pha | 4:10 |
| 10. | "Lil' Shorty" | Lil Jon | 3:28 |
| 11. | "International Player" | | 3:14 |
| 12. | "Porno Bitch" | Vincent "VT" Tolan | 3:37 |

== Charts ==
| Chart (2010) | Peak position |
|---|---|
| US Top R&B/Hip-Hop Albums (Billboard) | 70 |
