= Al Eaton =

- Also known as: Al "Baby Jesus" Eaton
- Born: Alfred Eaton
- Origin: Oakland, California, U.S.
- Genres: West Coast hip-hop; G-funk; Mobb
- Occupations: Record producer; songwriter; audio engineer
- Years active: 1978–present

Alfred Eaton is an American record producer, songwriter, and audio engineer based in Oakland, California. He is known for his production work for West Coast hip-hop artists.

== Career ==
Eaton began his music career in the late 1970s. His early work established him as a significant player in the development of West Coast hip-hop.

In the 1980s, Eaton made his mark on the hip-hop scene with pioneering work. He collaborated with Too Short on seminal albums such as Life Is... Too $hort and Freaky Tales. His innovative use of sampling and beat production helped define the sound of early West Coast rap.

During the 1990s, Eaton continued to influence the genre with a diverse range of projects. Notable collaborations include Kid Rock's Grits Sandwiches For Breakfast, as well as contributions to various No Limit Records releases. Eaton also worked with prominent artists like The Click, Rappin' 4-Tay and Spice 1.

In the 2000s, Eaton's career continued to flourish. He contributed to George Benson's Absolute Benson and worked with Spice 1 on The Last Dance.

Eaton operates One Little Indian Studios in Oakland, California, where he continues to be active in the music industry.

== Discography ==
Eaton's discography includes a wide array of roles:

- Production: Life Is... Too $hort (Too Short), Grits Sandwiches For Breakfast (Kid Rock), Deep N2 The Game (E-40)
- Technical Engineering: Contributions to albums like The Mail Man (Too Short) and various No Limit Records releases
- Remix and Additional Contributions: Work on tracks for artists including Queen Latifah and Zhané
