= Short Dog's in the House =

Studio album by Too Short
- Released: September 11, 1990
- Recorded: 1989–90
- Studios: One Little Indian, El Cerrito, CA; Echo Sound, Los Angeles, CA
- Genres: Dirty rap; G-funk
- Length: 70:36
- Labels: Jive; RCA
- Producers: Too Short; Sir Jinx; Pierre "The Beat Fixer" James; Keenan "The Maestro" Foster; Al Eaton; DJ Pooh

Too Short chronology
Life Is... Too Short (1988)	Short Dog's in the House (1990)	Shorty the Pimp (1992)

Singles from Short Dog's in the House
- 1. "Short But Funky" Released: 1990; 2. "The Ghetto" Released: October 8, 1990

Short Dog's in the House is the sixth album by American rapper Too Short. The album was released on September 11, 1990, via Jive Records. The CD contains a number of both socially conscious songs, as well as dirty rap and sexually-explicit songs that have made Too Short famous. The album's production samples a number of classic P-funk records, and uses the Roland TR-808 for rhythm. The laid-back beats (which Shaw himself dubbed "dope fiend beats") would be a major influence in hip hop years later, and the album was key in the development of G-funk that dominated the charts for the next few years. The album's cover was an influence for the cover art for Snoop Dogg's Doggystyle, just as Too Short's drawl-heavy delivery had influenced Snoop Dogg's vocal style. The album received a number of positive reviews, which helped it reach the highest position on the U.S. R&B charts of any of Too Short's albums up to that time.

The album featured a guest appearance by Ice Cube. The production of the album was handled mostly by a number of local Oakland-based producers (including Al Eaton, who was also known for his later work with Queen Latifah), but also received production from two of Ice Cube's producers, Sir Jinx and DJ Pooh. The edited version removes two songs and adds the song "What Rap?" On the edited version, "Ain't Nothin' but a Word to Me" was censored with bleep sound effects. Swearing is removed from other songs as well.

== Background and Conception ==
Too Short had received critical acclaim with his release of Life Is... Too Short, which had transformed the Oakland emcee from an underground rapper to one of hip-hop's most notable faces. The title single reached number 7 on Billboard's Hot Rap Singles chart, while the album peaked at number 37 on the Billboard 200.

Prior to the release of the album, there were a number of rumors that Too Short was killed in a crackhouse while smoking cocaine. Too Short released this album partly as a response to those rumors, and the rumors would later be addressed on the song "Dead or Alive".

Part of the direction of the album was influenced by Too Short's real surroundings in Oakland. The early 1990s were the peak of the crack epidemic, and Oakland was one of the hardest-hit cities. The back cover for the album sponsored the Stop the Violence Movement. Too Short released "The Ghetto" as a response to the plight of the inner cities, and the song would go on to receive heavy radio airplay across the United States. Donnie Hathaway's friend Roberta Flack thanked Too Short for honoring Hathaway's single of the same name.

== Reception ==
Professional ratings
Review scores
Source	Rating
AllMusic	4/5 stars
Robert Christgau	(choice cut)
Entertainment Weekly	B−
RapReviews	8.5/10
NME	3/10

NME said, "Trudging and lagging basslines swim in an endless stream of profanities. While Satan-tongued Luther Campbell and N.W.A scream daringly in your face, Short proves himself to be just an ugly, perverted midget who talks dirty cause he just don't get none."

== Track listing ==
No.	Title	Writer(s)	Producer(s)	Length
1.	"Short Dog's in the House"	Todd Anthony Shaw	Pierre James	6:02
2.	"It's Your Life"	Todd Anthony Shaw	Keenan Foster	4:48
3.	"The Ghetto"	Todd Anthony Shaw; Al Eaton; Donny Hathaway; Leroy Hutson	Al Eaton	5:02
4.	"Short But Funky"	Dame Edwards; Keenan Foster	Keenan Foster	4:13
5.	"In tha Oaktown"	Todd Anthony Shaw; Al Eaton	Al Eaton	4:38
6.	"Dead or Alive"	Todd Anthony Shaw	Too Short	5:46
7.	"Punk Bitch"	Todd Anthony Shaw; Al Eaton	Too Short; Al Eaton	6:01
8.	"Ain't Nothin' But a Word to Me" (featuring Ice Cube)	Todd Anthony Shaw; O'Shea Jackson; Anthony Wheaton	Sir Jinx	4:48
9.	"Hard on the Boulevard"	Todd Anthony Shaw	Too Short	6:24
10.	"Pimpology"	Todd Anthony Shaw; Keenan Foster	Too Short	6:07
11.	"Paula & Janet"	Todd Anthony Shaw	DJ Pooh	2:37
12.	"Rap Like Me"	Todd Anthony Shaw	Pierre James; Too Short	7:38
13.	"The Ghetto (Reprise)" (Instrumental)		Too Short; Al Eaton	5:36

Notes

- "It's Your Life" was included on the Boyz n the Hood soundtrack.
- On the cassette version of the album, "The Ghetto" is extended to 5:58, which features a segment of one of the Last Poets' speeches "Die Nigga". After Too Short's 4th verse, he says "For all you brothas runnin' around here usin' that "n-word", lets the original rappers kick the last verse", for which then the segment comes in. This part is omitted on compact disc, but can be found on the 12 inch single.
- On the clean version of the album, "Ain't Nothin' But A Word" is bleep censored, making the song virtually impossible to comprehend, with "Pimpology" & "Paula and Janet" completely omitted from the tracklisting.
- "Pimpology" contains several samples from the Oakland-based blaxploitation film The Mack.

Samples

- "It's Your Life" - Contains a sample of "Dr. Funkenstein" by Parliament and "Life is Too Short" by Too Short"
- "Short But Funky" - Contains a sample of "High" by Skyy
- "Dead or Alive" - Contains a sample of "Aqua Boogie (A Psychoalphadiscobetabioaquadoloop)" by Parliament
- "Ain't Nothin' But a Word to Me" - Contains a sample of "Hit or Miss" by Odetta
- "Hard on the Boulevard" - Contains a sample of "Fopp" by Ohio Players
- "Paula & Janet" - Contains a sample of "Sister Sanctified" by Stanley Turrentine/Milt Jackson and "Take the Money and Run" by Steve Miller Band
- "Rap Like Me" - Contains a sample of "Slow Dance" by Stanley Clarke

== Credits ==
=== Personnel ===
- Ice Cube – featured artist, lyricist
- Too $hort – drum programming, electric piano, keyboards, producer, mixing, lyricist, composer
- Al Eaton – drum programming, electric guitar, electric piano, guitar, keyboards, producer, mixing, composer
- Keenan “The Maestro” Foster – keyboards, electric piano, producer, composer
- Marquis “Hami” Dair – guitar, keyboards
- Pierre “The Beat Fixer” James – producer, scratches
- Sir Jinx – producer, composer
- DJ Pooh – producer, mixing engineer, composer
- Ted Bohanon – executive producer
- Dangerous Dame – composer
- Donny Hathaway – composer
- Leroy Hutson – composer
- Randolph Austin – management
- Danny McLane – backing vocals
- Duane Patton – backing vocals
- Gary Mackey – backing vocals
- Bozie – artwork
- Mark Wholey – graphics
- Victor Hall – photography
- Wayne Ho – photography

=== Companies & Locations ===
- Recorded at: One Little Indian Studios; Echo Sound
- Mixed at: One Little Indian Studios; Echo Sound
- Label: Jive Records; RCA Records
- Published by: Willesden Music Inc.; Zomba Enterprises, Inc.; Don-Pow Music; Gangsta Boogie Music
- Phonographic copyright ℗: Zomba Recording Corporation
- Copyright ©: Zomba Recording Corporation
- Distributed by: RCA Records

== Charts ==
=== Weekly charts ===
Chart (1990)	Peak position
US Billboard 200	20
US Top R&B/Hip-Hop Albums (Billboard)	3

=== Year-end charts ===
Chart (1990)	Position
US Top R&B/Hip-Hop Albums (Billboard)	92
Chart (1991)	Position
US Top R&B/Hip-Hop Albums (Billboard)	34

== Certifications ==
Region	Certification	Certified units/sales
United States (RIAA)	Platinum	1,000,000^{^}
^{^} Shipments figures based on certification alone.
