= Get off the Stage =

Get Off the Stage

Studio album by Too $hort
- Released: December 4, 2007
- Recorded: 2006–2007
- Studios: Blue Basement Recordings (Atlanta, Georgia); PatchWerk Recording Studios (Atlanta, Georgia); Young L Productions Studio
- Genres: Hyphy; dirty rap
- Length: 35:07
- Label: Jive
- Producers: Too $hort (exec.); Anthony Taylor; Cooly C; DJ Kizzy Rock; Gennessee; Spec; Traxamillion; Young L

Too $hort chronology
Blow the Whistle (2006)	Get Off the Stage (2007)	Still Blowin' (2010)

Professional ratings
Review scores
Source	Rating
AllMusic	2.5/5 stars
HipHopDX	2/5
PopMatters	1/10
RapReviews	5.5/10

Get Off the Stage is the seventeenth studio album by American rapper Too Short. It was released on December 4, 2007, by Jive Records, making it his fourteenth and final release with the label. Recording sessions took place at Blue Basement Recordings and at PatchWerk Recording Studios in Atlanta and Young L Productions Studio. Production was handled by Traxamillion, Cooly C, DJ Kizzy Rock, Spec, Anthony Taylor, Gennessee and Young L, with Too Short serving as executive producer. It features guest appearances from Dolla Will, E-40, Ginger, Kool-Ace, Mistah F.A.B., Ms. Hollywood, and the Pack.

Get Off the Stage peaked at number 160 on the Billboard 200 and number 21 on the Top R&B/Hip-Hop Albums in the United States. Imitative of the album's title, the album was met with generally negative reviews from music critics.

== Track listing ==
No.	Title	Writer(s)	Producer(s)	Length
1.	"Get Off the Stage"	Todd Shaw; Carl Dorsey; Lloyd Turner	Cooly C; Spec	4:16
2.	"Broke Bitch"	Shaw; Sultan Banks	Traxamillion	2:46
3.	"This My One" (featuring E-40)	Shaw; Earl Stevens; Banks	Traxamillion	3:15
4.	"Shittin' on 'Em"	Shaw; Banks	Traxamillion	4:03
5.	"F.U.C.K. Y.O.U." (featuring Mistah F.A.B., Ms. Hollywood and Ginger)	Shaw; Stanley P. Cox, Jr.; Krisheena Ledwell; Michelle Johnson; Gennessee Lewis	Gennessee	3:18
6.	"Gangstas & Strippers"	Shaw; Anthony Taylor	Anthony Taylor	3:36
7.	"Dum Ditty Dum" (featuring The Pack)	Shaw; Brandon McCartney; DaMonte Johnson; Keith Jenkins; Lloyd Omadhebo	Young L	2:40
8.	"Pull Them Panties Down" (featuring Kool-Ace)	Shaw; Dorsey; Turner	Cooly C; Spec	3:32
9.	"I Like It" (featuring Dolla Will)	Shaw; Will Scott, Jr.; Carlos Young	DJ Kizzy Rock	4:00
10.	"It Ain't Over"	Shaw; Young	DJ Kizzy Rock	3:41
Total length:				35:07

== Personnel ==
- Todd "Too $hort" Shaw – main artist, executive producer
- Earl "E-40" Stevens – featured artist (track 3)
- Stanley "Mistah F.A.B." Cox Jr. – featured artist (track 5)
- Ms. Hollywood – featured artist (track 5)
- Ginger – featured artist (track 5)
- Brandon "Lil B" McCartney – featured artist (track 7)
- DaMonte "Lil Uno" Johnson – featured artist (track 7)
- Keith "Stunnaman" Jenkins – featured artist (track 7)
- Lloyd "Young L" Omadhebo – featured artist, producer & recording (track 7)
- Brian "Kool-Ace" Fleming – featured artist (track 8)
- Will "Dolla Will" Scott Jr. – featured artist (track 9)
- Tanu – backing vocals (track 10)
- Carl "Cooly C" Dorsey – producer (tracks: 1, 8)
- Lloyd "Spec" Turner – producer (tracks: 1, 8)
- Sultan "Traxamillion" Banks – producer (tracks: 2–4)
- Gennessee Lewis – producer (track 5)
- Anthony Taylor – producer (track 6)
- Carlos "DJ Kizzy Rock" Young – producer (tracks: 9–10)
- Taj "Mahal" Tilghman – recording (tracks: 1, 2, 4–6, 8–10), coordinator
- Kori Anders – recording (tracks: 2, 9), mixing assistant (tracks: 2, 5, 7, 8, 10)
- Dale Everingham – recording (tracks: 3, 5)
- Leslie Brathwaite – mixing (tracks: 1–5, 7–10)
- Don "DJ Snake" Brown – mixing (track 6)
- Justin Trawick – mixing assistant (tracks: 1, 3, 4, 9)
- Bernie Grundman – mastering
- Meghan Foley – art direction, design
- Erwin Gorostiza – art direction
- Peter Graham – photography
- Shay Young – A&R
- Shari Reich – A&R
- Toi Green – A&R
- Cara Hutchinson – coordinator
- Damon Ellis – legal
- David Schmidt – legal
- Donato Guadagnoli – legal
- Lisa Pinero – legal

== Charts ==
Chart (2007)	Peak position
US Billboard 200	160
US Top R&B/Hip-Hop Albums (Billboard)	21
