= Snoop Dogg Presents Algorithm =

Compilation album by Snoop Dogg
- Released: November 19, 2021
- Genres: West Coast hip hop; R&B; gangsta rap
- Length: 67:10
- Labels: Doggy Style; Def Jam
- Producers: Dilip; DJ Battlecat; DJ Cassidy; D'Mile; D. Phelps; FnZ; Hi-Tek; Jay Millian; Kato; Keanu Beats; Kid Culture; Lhanze Beats; L.T. Hutton; Mark "The Mogul" Jackson; Mike Free; Nonstop Da Hitman; Nottz; P. Keys; Poo Bear; ProHoeZak; Quintin "Q" Gulledge; Rance; Rick Rock; Ron "Neff-U" Feemster; SNDTRK; Snoop Dogg; Soopafly; Terrace Martin; Travis Jasper; Tyler Jasper

Snoop Dogg chronology
From tha Streets 2 tha Suites (2021)	Snoop Dogg Presents Algorithm (2021)	BODR (2022)

Singles from The Algorithm
- 1. "Big Subwoofer" Released: October 20, 2021; 2. "Like My Weed" Released: November 1, 2021; 3. "Murder Music" Released: November 5, 2021

Snoop Dogg Presents Algorithm (or simply titled Algorithm) is a compilation album by American rapper Snoop Dogg. Some publications described the recording as a compilation album, but the rapper's official website described it as a studio album upon release. However, it is called a compilation album on the site's music section. Released on November 19, 2021 by Doggy Style Records and Def Jam Recordings and featured contributions from various artists including Method Man & Redman, Eric Bellinger, Usher, Blxst, Fabolous, and Dave East.

== Background ==
Following his appointment as executive creative consultant at Def Jam Recordings in June, Snoop Dogg officially announced the album on October 26, 2021. He subsequently released the singles "Big Subwoofer" on October 20 and "Murder Music" on November 5. He appeared on The Tonight Show Starring Jimmy Fallon on September 27 to tease the album, and he also appeared on the podcast The Joe Rogan Experience on November 12 in promotion of the album.

== Critical reception ==
Professional ratings
Aggregate scores
Source	Rating
Metacritic	70/100
Review scores
Source	Rating
AllMusic	4/5 stars
Clash	7/10
The Guardian	4/5 stars
The Independent	5/5 stars
The Line of Best Fit	7/10
NME	3/5 stars
Rolling Stone	2.5/5 stars

Algorithm received positive reviews from critics. At Metacritic, which assigns a normalized rating out of 100 to reviews from critics, the album received an average score of 70, which indicates "generally favorable reviews", based on nine reviews.

== Commercial performance ==
Algorithm debuted at number 166 on the US Billboard 200, becoming his 26th entry on the Billboard 200. The album debuted at number 8 on the US Compilation Albums, marking Snoop Dogg's first album on the chart.

== Track listing ==
Track listing adapted from Genius.

Algorithm track listing
No.	Title	Producer(s)	Length
1.	"Intro"	Snoop Dogg	0:14
2.	"Alright" (performed by Method Man and Redman featuring Nefertitti Avani and SAAY)	DJ Battlecat	3:35
3.	"No Bammer Weed"	Rick Rock	3:05
4.	"New Oldie" (performed by Eric Bellinger and Usher featuring Snoop Dogg)	Rance; D. Phelps; Quintin "Q" Gulledge	3:20
5.	"Make Some Money" (performed by Fabolous and Dave East featuring Snoop Dogg)	Hi-Tek	2:42
6.	"Anxiety" (performed by Malaya)	Terrace Martin; Kid Culture	2:36
7.	"Like My Weed" (performed by Jane Handcock)	SNDTRK	3:01
8.	"Applying Pressure" (performed by YK Osiris featuring Snoop Dogg)	Poo Bear; Mark "The Mogul" Jackson	2:43
9.	"Go to War" (with Blxst)	Jay Millian	2:51
10.	"I Want You" (performed by October London)	Soopafly; Lhanze Beats	2:28
11.	"GYU" (performed by August 08 featuring Ty Dolla Sign and Bino Rideaux)	FnZ; Nonstop Da Hitman; Keanu Beats	3:25
12.	"Inspiration" (performed by Malaya)	Soopafly	2:27
13.	"Big Subwoofer" (performed by Mount Westmore)	Kato; P. Keys	3:43
14.	"Murder Music" (with Benny the Butcher, Jadakiss, and Busta Rhymes)	Nottz	4:02
15.	"Been Thru" (performed by HeyDeon)	Mike Free; Dilip	1:45
16.	"Qualified" (featuring Larry June and October London)	Nottz	2:32
17.	"Everybody Dies" (performed by Choc)	Tyler Jasper; Travis Jasper	2:23
18.	"By & By" (performed by Jane Handcock)	DJ Battlecat	2:44
19.	"Diamond Life" (with DJ Cassidy featuring Mary J. Blige)	D'Mile; DJ Cassidy	3:12
20.	"Whatever You On" (performed by Jane Handcock)	Nottz	2:36
21.	"Make It Last" (performed by Nefertitti Avani)	L.T. Hutton	2:06
22.	"No Smut on My Name" (featuring Battle Loco and Kokane)	DJ Battlecat	2:33
23.	"Get My Money" (featuring Prohoezak)	Prohoezak	3:21
24.	"Steady" (performed by Camino featuring D Smoke and Wiz Khalifa)	Ron "NEFF-U" Feemster	3:04
25.	"Outro"	DJ Battlecat	0:42
Total length:			67:10

== Charts ==
Chart performance for Snoop Dogg Presents Algorithm
Chart (2021)	Peak position
Swiss Albums (Schweizer Hitparade)	95
US Billboard 200	166
US Compilation Albums	8
