= The Ghetto (Too Short song) =

1990 single by Too Short

Single by Too $hort

from the album Short Dog's in the House
- Released: October 8, 1990
- Recorded: 1990
- Studio: One Little Indian Studios (El Cerrito, California)
- Length: 5:02
- Label: Jive
- Songwriters: Todd Shaw; Al Eaton; Donny Hathaway; Leroy Hutson
- Producers: Al Eaton; Too $hort

Too $hort singles chronology
"Life Is... Too Short" (1989)	"The Ghetto" (1990)	"Short But Funky" (1990)

Music video
- "The Ghetto" on YouTube

"The Ghetto" is a song by the Oakland-based rapper Too Short, with additional vocals by Gerald LeVert. It was released on October 8, 1990, via Jive Records as the lead single from his sixth album Short Dog's in the House. Recorded at One Little Indian Studios in El Cerrito, California, it was produced and mixed by Al Eaton and Too Short. The instrumental is based on the Donny Hathaway hit "The Ghetto".

The single peaked at number 42 on the Billboard Hot 100, number 12 on the Hot R&B Singles chart and number 3 on the Hot Rap Singles chart in the United States.

== Track listing ==
No.	Title	Writer(s)	Length
1.	"The Ghetto" (extended version)	Todd Anthony Shaw; Al Eaton; Donny Hathaway; Leroy Hutson	5:59
2.	"The Ghetto" (single edit)	Shaw; Eaton; Hathaway; Hutson	5:02
3.	"The Ghetto" (instrumental)	Shaw; Eaton; Hathaway; Hutson	5:35
4.	"The Ghetto" (Too Short extended remix)	Shaw; Eaton; Hathaway; Hutson	5:45
5.	"The Ghetto" (Too Short extended mix)	Shaw; Eaton; Hathaway; Hutson	5:52
6.	"What Rap?"	Shaw	4:14

== Personnel ==
- Todd "Too $hort" Shaw – rap vocals, producer, mixing, drum programming, composer, lyricist
- DJ Pooh – mixing engineer
- Al Eaton – producer, mixing, drum programming, composer, lyricist, guitarist
- Donny Hathaway – composer, lyricist, keyboardist
- Gerald LeVert – Additional Vocals
- Leroy Hutson – composer, lyricist, keyboardist
- Keenan "The Maestro" Foster – composer, lyricist, keyboardist
- Victor Hall – photography
- ZombArt – design

== Chart positions ==
Chart (1990–91)	Peak position
US Billboard Hot 100	42
US Hot R&B/Hip-Hop Songs (Billboard)	12
US Hot Rap Songs (Billboard)	3
