= Married to the Game =

Studio album by Too Short
- Released: November 4, 2003
- Recorded: 2003
- Studios: The Hit Factory Criteria (Miami, FL); Circle House Studios (Miami, FL); The Enterprise (Burbank, CA); Sound On Sound Recording (New York, NY); Stankonia Recording (Atlanta, GA); Westlake Audio (Los Angeles, CA)
- Genres: Dirty rap; crunk; gangsta rap
- Length: 1:02:23
- Labels: $hort; Jive
- Producers: Ant Banks; Dez; Jazze Pha; Lil Jon

Too Short chronology
What's My Favorite Word? (2002)	Married to the Game (2003)	Blow the Whistle (2006)

Singles from Married to the Game
- 1. "Shake That Monkey" Released: July 22, 2003; 2. "Choosin'" Released: 2004

Professional ratings
Review scores
Source	Rating
AllMusic	2.5/5 stars
RapReviews	8/10

Married to the Game is the fifteenth studio album by American rapper Too Short. It was released on November 4, 2003, through Jive Records, making it his 12th album on the label. Recording sessions took place at The Hit Factory Criteria and Circle House Studios in Miami, The Enterprise in Burbank, Sound On Sound Recording in New York, Stankonia Recording in Atlanta and Westlake Audio in Los Angeles. Production was handled by Dez, Lil Jon, Ant Banks, and Jazze Pha, with Too $hort serving as executive producer. It features guest appearances from Cutty Cartel, Devin the Dude, Jagged Edge, Jazze Pha, Lil' Jon & the East Side Boyz, Noreaga, Oobie and Petey Pablo. The album peaked at number 49 on the Billboard 200 and number 7 on the Top R&B/Hip-Hop Albums in the United States. Its lead single, "Shake That Monkey", made it to number 84 on the Billboard Hot 100 and number 56 on the Hot R&B/Hip-Hop Songs. The album's second single, "Choosin'", reached number 61 on the Hot R&B/Hip-Hop Songs.

== Track listing ==
No.	Title	Writer(s)	Producer(s)	Length
1.	"Choosin'" (featuring Jagged Edge and Jazze Pha)	Todd Shaw; Brandon Casey; Brian Casey; Phalon Alexander	Jazze Pha	3:57
2.	"What She Gonna Do?"	Shaw; Anthony Banks; Howard Hewett; Dana Meyers	Ant Banks	4:41
3.	"That's How It Goes Down" (featuring Oobie)	Shaw; Tenaia Sanders; Jonathan Smith	Lil Jon	5:01
4.	"You Can't Fuck with Us" (featuring Petey Pablo and N.O.R.E.)	Shaw; Moses Barrett III; Victor Santiago; J. Smith	Lil Jon	3:52
5.	"Shake That Monkey" (featuring Lil' Jon & the East Side Boyz)	Shaw; J. Smith	Lil Jon	4:38
6.	"Burn Rubber"	Shaw; J. Smith; Robert Arthur Ford; James B. Moore; Russell W. Simmons; Lawrence Smith; Harry Palmer	Lil Jon	3:19
7.	"Hey, Let's Go" (featuring Devin the Dude and Cutty Cartel)	Shaw; Devin Copeland; Ricardo Lewis; J. Smith	Lil Jon	4:23
8.	"Pimpandho.com"	Shaw; Desmond Mapp	Dez	3:44
9.	"Hobo Hoeing"	Shaw; Mapp	Dez	4:09
10.	"Get It"	Shaw; Mapp	Dez	3:56
11.	"Married to the Game"	Shaw; Mapp	Dez	2:37
12.	"California Girls"	Shaw; Mapp	Dez	3:52
13.	"What's a Pimp?"	Shaw; Shanell Woodgett; Mapp	Dez	5:54
14.	"Don't Act Like That"	Shaw; Mapp	Dez	4:00
15.	"Short Short"	Shaw; Jerry Perkins; Mapp	Dez	4:21
Total length:				1:02:23

Sample credits

- Track 2 contains a portion of the composition "This Is for the Lover in You" written by Howard Hewett and Dana Meyers.
- Track 6 contains samples from "Tough" as performed by Kurtis Blow and "The Champ" as performed by The Mohawks.

== Personnel ==
- Todd "Too $hort" Shaw – vocals, executive producer
- Jagged Edge – vocals (track 1)
- Phalon "Jazze Pha" Alexander – vocals & producer (track 1)
- Keri Hilson – background vocals (track 1)
- Dionne Denham – background vocals (track 2)
- Tenaia "Oobie" Sanders – vocals (track 3)
- Moses "Petey Pablo" Barrett III – vocals (track 4)
- Victor "Noreaga" Santiago – vocals (track 4)
- Jonathan "Lil Jon" Smith – vocals (track 5), producer (tracks: 3–7)
- Devin "The Dude" Copeland – vocals (track 7)
- Ricardo "Cutty Cartel" Lewis – vocals (track 7)
- Desmond "Dez Dynamic" Mapp – background vocals (tracks: 9, 12, 15), producer (tracks: 8–15)
- Val Young – background vocals (tracks: 13, 14)
- Shanell Woodgett – background vocals (track 13)
- Jerry Perkins – background vocals (track 15)
- Craig Love – guitar (tracks: 3, 5, 7)
- James "LRoc" Phillips – keyboards (tracks: 3, 7)
- LaMarquis Jefferson – bass (tracks: 3, 5, 7)
- Rob MacDonald – keyboards (tracks: 4, 5)
- Nvs Styles – scratches (track 6)
- Charles Fearing – guitar (tracks: 8, 9, 11–13, 15)
- Anthony "Ant" Banks – producer (track 2), mixing (tracks: 2, 8–15)
- Ray Seay – mixing (tracks: 1, 3–7)
- Chaz Harper – mastering
- Patrick Hoelck – photography

== Charts ==
Chart (2003)	Peak position
US Billboard 200	49
US Top R&B/Hip-Hop Albums (Billboard)	7
