= No Trespassing (album) =

Studio album by Too Short
- Released: February 28, 2012
- Recorded: 2010–2011
- Genre: Hip hop
- Length: 65:21
- Label: Dangerous Music; EMI
- Producer: Too Short; Vincent "VT" Tolan; Erk Tha Jerk; Rob-E; Rico Tha Kidd; Chase Hattan; DJ Klypso; Lil' Jon; FX; Beat Roc; Marc Garvey; C. Ballin; Evan Bogart; Elijah Baker; Exclusive; Wallpaper

Too Short chronology
Respect the Pimpin' (2010)	No Trespassing (2012)	History: Mob Music (2012)

Singles from No Trespassing
- 1. "Money on the Floor" Released: October 7, 2011

Professional ratings
Review scores
Source	Rating
AllMusic	3.5/5 stars
RapReviews	(6.5/10)

No Trespassing is the nineteenth studio album by American rapper Too Short. It was released on February 28, 2012, under Dangerous Music, owned by Too Short. The album's production was handled by Vincent VT Tolan, Exclusive, DJ Klypso, and various others with guest features from 50 Cent, E-40, Kokane and Snoop Dogg.

== Background ==
The album was backed by the lead single "Money on the Floor", which features Bay Area friend and ex-Label Mate, E-40. After the video release $hort revealed the cover of the album, that features his face over plates of the warning of No Trespassing, and after few days the track list was revealed to the public.

Music videos were also released for "I Got Caught" featuring Martin Luther, "Playa Fo Life" featuring Dom Kennedy and Beeda Weeda, "Hey" featuring Silk-E, "Hog Ridin'" featuring Richie Rich, "Double Header" featuring Wallpaper, and "Trying to Come Up" featuring C.O.

== Commercial performance ==
The album debuted at number 129 on the Billboard 200 with first-week sales of 5,000 copies in the United States.

== Track listing ==
No.	Title	Producer(s)	Length
1.	"What the Fuck"	Erk Tha Jerk; Too Short	4:33
2.	"Got Her Like"	VT	4:31
3.	"Playa fo Life" (featuring 1-O.A.K., Beeda Weeda, and Dom Kennedy)	Rob-E	3:29
4.	"Trying to Come Up" (featuring C.O. and Sir Michael Rocks)	VT	4:14
5.	"Cush Cologne" (featuring Rico Tha Kidd and DJ Upgrade)	Rico Tha Kidd; Too Short	3:53
6.	"The Magazine" (featuring Chase Hattan)	Chase Hattan	2:58
7.	"I Got Caught" (featuring Martin Luther)	VT; Too Short	4:28
8.	"I'm a Stop" (featuring 50 Cent, Devin the Dude, and Twista)	DJ Klypso	4:59
9.	"Hog Ridin'" (featuring Richie Rich)	Lil Jon	4:18
10.	"Porno Bitch"	VT	3:12
11.	"Shut Up Nancy" (featuring Kokane)	FX	4:08
12.	"Boss" (featuring Silk-E)	Beat Roc	4:22
13.	"Hey" (featuring Silk-E)	Marc Garvey	3:30
14.	"Money on the Floor" (featuring E-40)	C. Ballin	3:55
15.	"Double Header" (featuring Wallpaper)	Evan Bogart; Wallpaper	2:34
16.	"Respect the Pimpin'" (featuring Snoop Dogg)	Elijah Baker	2:56
17.	"Ba Boom Cha" (featuring Yung Lott, DB Tha General, Rico Tha Kidd, DJ Upgrade, Ginger, and Prince Lefty)	Exclusive	3:28

Notes

- Sir Michael Rocks is not credited on "Trying to Come Up", his verse can only be heard in song's music video.
