= Born to Mack =

Studio album by Too Short
- Released: July 20, 1987; March 1, 1988 (Dangerous Music/RCA release); August 24, 1989 (Jive/RCA compact disc release)
- Recorded: 1986–87 (except "Mack Attack" in 1988)
- Genre: West Coast hip-hop; dirty rap
- Length: 51:12
- Label: Dangerous Music; Jive; RCA
- Producer: Too Short; T. Bohanon

Too Short chronology
Raw, Uncut, and X-Rated (1986)	Born to Mack (1987)	Life Is... Too Short (1988)

Born to Mack is the fourth studio album and debut major label album by American rapper Too Short. The album was released in 1987 via Dangerous Music. It was re-released on March 1, 1988, by Jive Records/RCA, before the success of Life Is...Too Short, although Jive Records logos did not appear on it until it was released on compact disc in 1989.

Too Short sold around 50,000 copies of the album directly from the trunk of his car.

== Critical reception ==
Professional ratings
Review scores
Source	Rating
AllMusic	3/5 stars
The Encyclopedia of Popular Music	3/5 stars
RapReviews	7/10
The Rolling Stone Album Guide	2/5 stars
Spin Alternative Record Guide	7/10

Trouser Press wrote that Too Short made "weak work of simple beats and unconvincing boasts, big-booty fantasies ('Freaky Tales,' 'Partytime'), ugly putdowns ('Dope Fiend Beat') and jailbait concerns ('Little Girls')." The Spin Alternative Record Guide wrote that the album elevates "the 75 Girl formula without abandoning it."

== Track listing ==
All tracks are written by Todd Shaw.

No.	Title	Length
1.	"Partytime"	5:00
2.	"Mack Attack" (released on 1988 version)	5:57
3.	"Playboy Short II"	7:10
4.	"You Know What I Mean"	6:00
5.	"Freaky Tales"	9:30
6.	"Dope Fiend Beat"	6:31
7.	"Little Girls"	6:10
8.	"The Universal Mix"	3:42

== Charts ==
Chart (1987)	Peak position
US Top R&B/Hip-Hop Albums (Billboard)	50

== Certifications ==
Region	Certification	Certified units/sales
United States (RIAA)	Gold	500,000^{^}
^{^} Shipments figures based on certification alone.
