= Blow the Whistle (song) =

Single by Too Short

from the album Blow the Whistle
- Released: March 3, 2006
- Recorded: 2005
- Genre: West Coast hip-hop; hyphy
- Length: 2:48
- Label: Up All Night; Jive; Zomba
- Songwriters: Todd Shaw; Jonathan Smith; Craig Love; LaMarquis Jefferson; James Phillips
- Producer: Lil Jon

Too Short singles chronology
"Shake That Monkey" (2003)	"Blow the Whistle" (2006)	"Bossy" (2006)

"Blow the Whistle" is a song by American rapper Too Short, released by Up All Nite, Zomba and Jive Records on March 3, 2006 as the lead single from his sixteenth album of the same name. The song, produced by Lil Jon, features a refrain in which Too Short utters "blow the whistle!", followed by a series of whistle blasts.

"Blow the Whistle" peaked atop the Bubbling Under Hot 100 chart; despite not entering the Billboard Hot 100, it is often considered Too Short's signature song.

== Sampling ==
Canadian rapper Drake sampled the beat and paid homage to the intro lyrics on DJ Khaled's hit single "For Free". American rapper and fellow Bay Area native Saweetie sampled the beat on her 2020 single "Tap In". Too Short gave her his blessing to use the sample. Also Oakland rapper G-Eazy sampled the song lyrics on his 2024 song "All I Wanna Do".

== Usage in media ==
During the 2008 NBA Playoff series between the Cleveland Cavaliers and the Washington Wizards, Jay-Z made a freestyle to this called "Playoff", responding to negative comments by DeShawn Stevenson on behalf of LeBron James. It was also featured on the soundtrack of NBA 2K13 as well as NBA 2K26.

The song has been featured on the HBO shows Eastbound & Down, Entourage, Euphoria, and Insecure.

During the Super Bowl LIX celebrations in early 2025, Gillie da Kid led dances with the Philadelphia Eagles using the song, one of which was joined by Too Short himself.

== Charts ==
Chart (2006)	Peak position
US Bubbling Under Hot 100 (Billboard)	1
US Hot R&B/Hip-Hop Songs (Billboard)	70
US Hot Rap Songs (Billboard)	21
US Rhythmic Airplay (Billboard)	26
