= Players (album) =

Studio album by Too Short
- Released: 1985
- Studio: Different Fur Recordings
- Genre: Hip-hop
- Length: 44:23
- Label: 75 Girls
- Producer: Dean Hodges

Too Short chronology
Don't Stop Rappin' (1983)	Players (1985)	Raw, Uncut and X-Rated (1986)

Professional ratings
Review scores
Source	Rating
Allmusic	2/5 stars

Players is the second studio album by American Oakland-based rapper Too Short. It was released in 1985 via 75 Girls Records. Production of the record was handled by Dean Hodges, who also served as executive producer.

== Track listing ==
No.	Title	Length
1.	"Players"	6:58
2.	"From Here to New York"	6:08
3.	"Don't Ever Stop"	6:32
4.	"Wild, Wild West"	7:03
5.	"Everytime"	5:00
6.	"Dance (Don't Geek)"	5:53
7.	"Coke Dealers"	6:49
Total length:		44:23

== Personnel ==
- Todd Anthony Shaw - vocals, keyboards
- Dean Hodges - producer, executive producer
- Marvin Holmes - guitar
- Keenan "The Maestro" Foster - keyboards
- Howard Johnston - engineer
- H. Kennedy - keyboards
- G. Levias - keyboards
- Matthias Mederer - guitar
