= Life Is... Too Short =

Studio album by Too Short
- Released: January 1989
- Genre: Hip-hop
- Length: 54:52
- Labels: Dangerous Music; Jive; RCA
- Producers: Too Short; R. Austin; T. Bohanon; Al Eaton

Too Short chronology
Born to Mack (1987)	Life Is... Too Short (1989)	Short Dog's in the House (1990)

Life Is... Too Short (stylized as Life Is... Too $hort) is the fifth album by American rapper Too Short. It was released in 1989 via Dangerous Music and Jive Records. It is currently Too Short's highest-selling album, having been certified double Platinum by the RIAA for sales of over 2 million copies.

== Background ==
"Don't Fight the Feelin'" samples the 1982 One Way song of the same name.

== Critical reception ==
Professional ratings
Review scores
Source	Rating
AllMusic	5/5 stars
MusicHound R&B: The Essential Album Guide	4/5 stars
RapReviews	7.5/10
The Rolling Stone Album Guide	2.5/5 stars
The Village Voice	B+

In 2022, Rolling Stone included Life Is... Too Short on their list of "The 200 Greatest Hip-Hop Albums of All Time", at No. 186.

== Track listing ==
All tracks are written by Todd Shaw, except where noted.

No.	Title	Writer(s)	Length
1.	"Life Is... Too Short"		4:34
2.	"Rhymes"		4:17
3.	"I Ain't Trippin'"		6:41
4.	"Nobody Does It Better"		6:15
5.	"Oakland"	Shaw; Al Eaton	4:41
6.	"Don't Fight the Feelin'" (featuring Danger Zone and Rappin' 4-Tay)		8:18
7.	"CussWords"		7:44
8.	"City of Dope"	Shaw; Eaton	5:31
9.	"Pimp the Ho"		5:54
10.	"Outro"		0:59

== Personnel ==
- T. Bohanon - Producer
- Al Eaton - Guitar, Keyboards, Producer, Mixing
- Victor Hall - Photography
- Helen Kim - Vocals (background)
- Mr. Z - Clothing/Wardrobe
- Todd Shaw - Keyboards, Programming, Producer, Drum Programming, Mixing
- Janna Thomas - Vocals (background)
- Mark Wholey - Artwork
- Jeanette Wright - Vocals (background)
- Rappin' 4-Tay - Performer

== Charts ==
=== Weekly charts ===
Chart (1989)	Peak position
US Billboard 200	37
US Top R&B/Hip-Hop Albums (Billboard)	9

=== Year-end charts ===
Chart (1989)	Position
US Top R&B/Hip-Hop Albums (Billboard)	16

== Certifications ==
Region	Certification	Certified units/sales
United States (RIAA)	2× Platinum	2,000,000^{^}
^{^} Shipments figures based on certification alone.
