= Raw, Uncut and X-Rated =

Studio album by Too Short
- Released: 1986
- Recorded: 1985
- Genre: Hip hop; dirty rap
- Length: 40:22
- Label: 75 Girls
- Producer: Dean Hodges

Too Short chronology
Players (1985)	Raw, Uncut and X-Rated (1986)	Born to Mack (1987)

Professional ratings
Review scores
Source	Rating
Allmusic	2/5 stars

Raw, Uncut and X-Rated is the third studio album by American Oakland-based rapper Too Short. It was released via 75 Girls Records.

== Track listing ==
No.	Title	Length
1.	"Invasion of Flat Booty Bitches"	5:07
2.	"She's a Bitch"	9:50
3.	"Oakland, California"	6:49
4.	"The Bitch Sucks Dick"	6:30
5.	"Short Side/Blow Job Betty"	12:05
Total length:		40:22

Notes

- "She's A Bitch" sampled "Funk It Up '85" by The Sequence
- "The Bitch Sucks Dick" sampled "Mosquito" by West Street Mob
- "Short Side/Blow Job Betty" sampled "Rappin' Duke" by Rappin' Duke
- "Oakland, California" sampled "I Want You" by LL Cool J

== Personnel ==
- Todd Anthony Shaw - vocals
- Dean Hodges - producer
