= Adrian Marcel =

American R&B singer

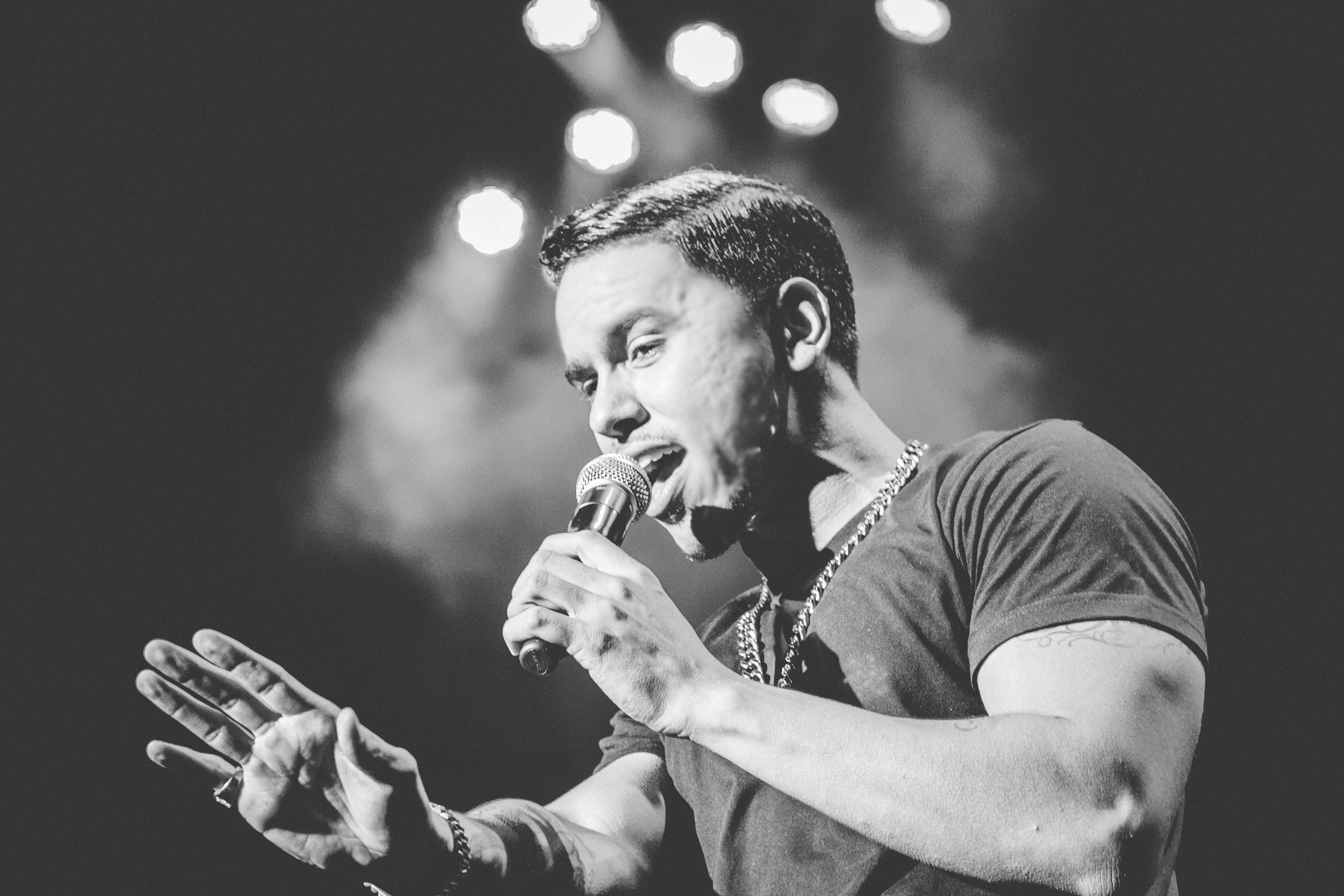
- Hutton performing in 2015

Background information
- Born: Adrian Marcel Hutton; May 22, 1990 (age 36); Oakland, California, U.S.
- Genres: R&B; hip hop
- Occupations: Singer; songwriter; rapper
- Years active: 2012–present
- Labels: El Seven; Universal Republic; 3VMG
- Management: Raphael Saadiq

Adrian Marcel Hutton (born May 22, 1990) is an American R&B singer, songwriter, and rapper from Oakland, California. His debut mixtape, 7 Days of Weak (2014), was presented by American singer Raphael Saadiq, who took Marcel in as his protégé.

Marcel's 2014 single, "2AM" (featuring Sage the Gemini), received gold certification by the Recording Industry Association of America (RIAA). In July 2014, he released his second mixtape, Weak After Next.

== Early life ==
Starting in 2003, Marcel attended Oakland School for the Arts. He stated that his parents were pivotal in encouraging him to pursue a career in the performing arts. Marcel sang with Mase on the song "Awkward" in 2012.

== Discography ==
Albums:

- #GMFU – Got Me F%^&ed Up (2017)
- 98th (2019)

Mixtapes:

- 7 Days of Weak (2013)
- Weak After Next (2014)
- Weak After Next Reloaded (2018)
