= Blow the Whistle (album) =

Studio album by Too Short
- Released: August 29, 2006
- Recorded: 2005–06
- Genres: West Coast hip-hop; crunk; hyphy
- Length: 1:00:35
- Labels: Up All Nite; Jive; Zomba
- Producers: Lil Jon; Jazze Pha; Droop-E; Filthy Fingaz; Maestro; Playa Poncho; Sonny B; will.i.am

Too Short chronology
Married to the Game (2003)	Blow the Whistle (2006)	Get off the Stage (2007)

Singles from Blow the Whistle
- 1. "Blow the Whistle" Released: March 7, 2006; 2. "Keep Bouncin'" Released: September 19, 2006

Professional ratings
Review scores
Source	Rating
AllHipHop	3/5
AllMusic	4/5 stars
HipHopDX	3.5/5
PopMatters	6/10
RapReviews	7.5/10
XXL	4/5 (XL)

Blow the Whistle is the sixteenth studio album by the American rapper Too Short. It was released on August 29, 2006 by Up All Nite Records, Zomba Label Group, and Jive Records. Production was handled by Lil Jon, Jazze Pha, Droop-E, Filthy Fingaz, Maestro, Playa Poncho, Sonny B and will.i.am. It features guest appearances from Jazze Pha and will.i.am themselves, as well as Bun B, David Banner, Dolla Will, E-40, Mistah F.A.B., Pimp C, Rick Ross, Snoop Dogg, and Tha Dogg Pound. The album debuted at number 14 on the Billboard 200, number seven on the Top R&B/Hip-Hop Albums, number six on the Top Rap Albums and number eight on the Tastemaker Albums charts.

The cover art for the album was revealed on August 8, 2006 and the track-list was released on the 19th.

== Track listing ==
No.	Title	Writer(s)	Producer(s)	Length
1.	"Call Her a Bitch"	Todd Shaw; Gerald McCrary; C. Broughton	Playa Poncho; Maestro	3:58
2.	"Blow the Whistle"	Shaw; Jonathan Smith; James Elbert Phillips; Craig Love; LaMarquis Jefferson	Lil Jon	2:43
3.	"Burn Rubber, Pt. 2"	Shaw; Smith; Phillips	Lil Jon	3:08
4.	"Keep Bouncin' (Street)" (featuring Snoop Dogg, will.i.am, and Fergie)	Shaw; Calvin Broadus; William Adams	will.i.am; Rick Rock (co.)	4:09
5.	"Pimpin' Forever"	Shaw; Phalon Alexander; Zak Wallace	Jazze Pha	4:47
6.	"Money Maker" (featuring Pimp C and Rick Ross)	Shaw; Chad Butler; William Roberts; Smith; Phillips; Love	Lil Jon	3:59
7.	"Strip Down" (featuring Jazze Pha)	Shaw; Alexander; Charles Pettaway; Wallace	Jazze Pha	3:46
8.	"Nothing Feels Better" (featuring Jazze Pha)	Shaw; Alexander; Pettaway; Wallace	Jazze Pha; Charles Pettaway (co.)	4:26
9.	"Sophisticated" (featuring Jazze Pha)	Shaw; Alexander; Pettaway; Wallace	Jazze Pha	4:04
10.	"Playa" (featuring Jazze Pha)	Shaw; Alexander; Pettaway	Jazze Pha	4:05
11.	"16 Hoes" (featuring Jazze Pha and Bun B)	Shaw; Alexander; Bernard Freeman; Wallace	Jazze Pha	3:51
12.	"Baller" (featuring David Banner)	Shaw; Lavell Crump; Sonny Sowles; Richard Harris	Sonny B; Filthy Fingaz	3:34
13.	"Sadity" (featuring Tha Dogg Pound)	Shaw; Smith	Lil Jon	3:30
14.	"I Want Your Girl" (featuring E-40, Dolla Will, and Mistah F.A.B.)	Shaw; Earl Stevens; Will Scott Jr.; Earl Stevens Jr.; G. Archer	Droop-E	3:34
15.	"It's Time to Go"	Shaw; Smith; Phillips; Love	Lil Jon	3:33
16.	"Shake It Baby"	Shaw; Smith; Phillips; Love; S. Jordan	Lil Jon	3:28
Total length:				1:00:35

== Charts ==
Chart (2006)	Peak position
US Billboard 200	14
US Top R&B/Hip-Hop Albums (Billboard)	7
US Top Rap Albums (Billboard)	6
US Indie Store Album Sales (Billboard)	8
