= Too Short =

American rapper (born 1966)

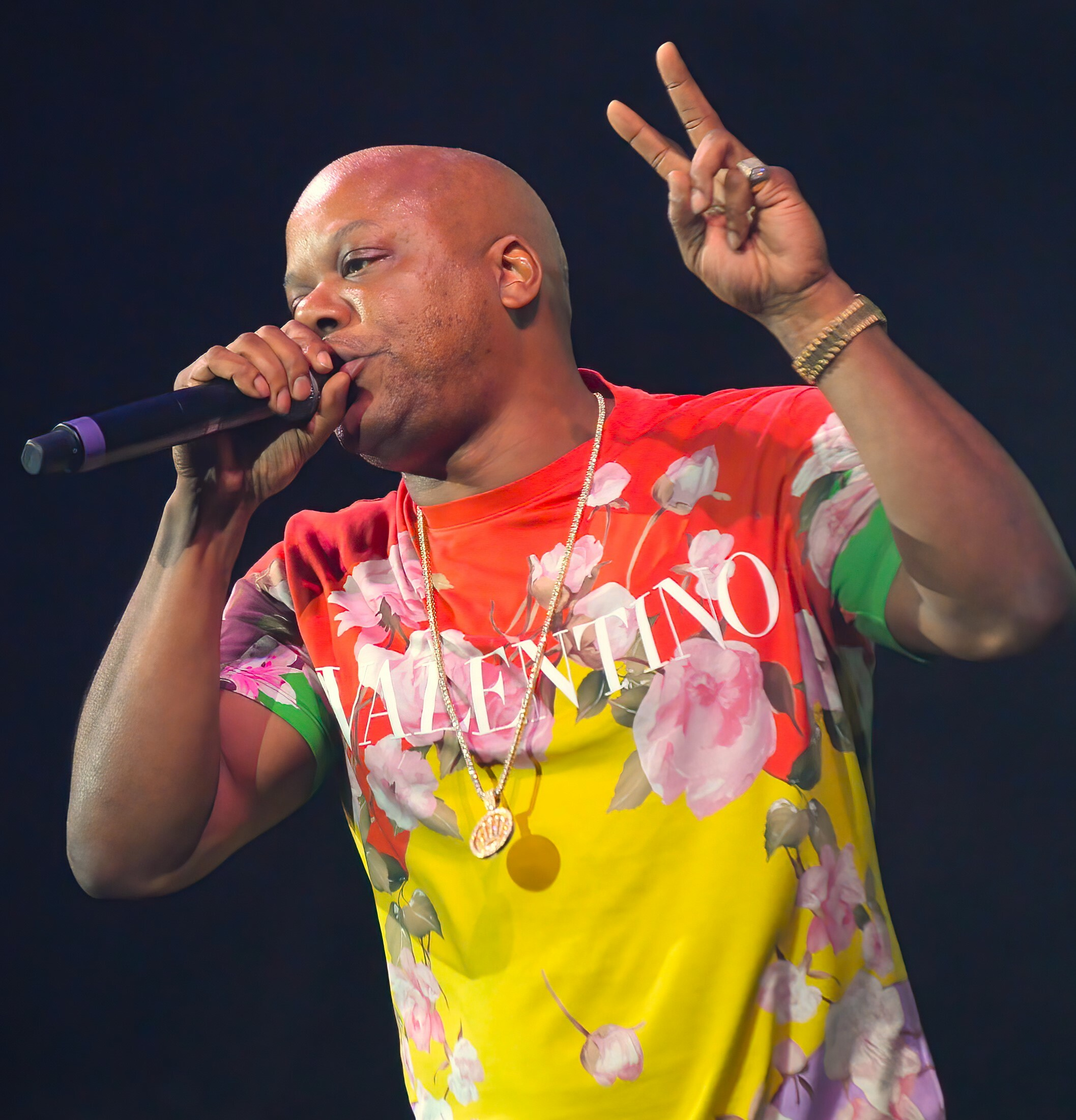
- Too Short performing in August 2023

Background information
- Also known as: Short Dogg
- Born: Todd Anthony Shaw; April 28, 1966 (age 60); Los Angeles, California, U.S.
- Origin: Oakland, California, U.S.
- Genres: West Coast hip-hop; gangsta rap; dirty rap; G-funk
- Occupations: Rapper; songwriter; record producer; record executive
- Works: Discography
- Years active: 1983–present
- Labels: EMPIRE; OG; EMI; Jive; Thump; Priority; Up All Nite
- Member of: Mt. Westmore
- Formerly of: The Dangerous Crew
- Children: 1
- Website: tooshortstore.com

Todd Anthony Shaw (born April 28, 1966), known professionally as Too Short (stylized as Too $hort), is an American rapper. A pioneer of West Coast hip-hop, Shaw was among the first acts to receive recognition in the genre during the late 1980s. His lyrics were often based on pimping and promiscuity, but also drug culture and street survival; exemplified respectively in his most popular singles "Blow the Whistle" and "The Ghetto". He is one of few acts to have worked with both Tupac Shakur and the Notorious B.I.G. at the heights of their respective careers.

Shaw began recording in 1983, and cultivated a regional following with three independent projects tailored for his native Oakland. His fourth album, Born to Mack (1987) sold an estimated 50,000 units from Shaw's car trunk, leading to a commercial re-issue by Jive Records the following year. His fifth album, Life Is... Too Short (1989), received double platinum certification by the Recording Industry Association of America (RIAA) and became his first entry on the Billboard 200. His sixth album, Short Dog's In The House (1990), peaked at number 20 on the chart and spawned the single "The Ghetto", which became his first and highest-charting entry on the Billboard Hot 100 as a lead artist. His next four albums—Shorty the Pimp (1992), Get in Where You Fit In (1993), Cocktails (1995), and Gettin' It (Album Number Ten) (1996)—each peaked within the top ten of the Billboard 200 and received platinum certifications by the RIAA.

In 1988, he formed The Dangerous Crew, a collective of fellow Oakland-based rappers and producers, and in 2020, he formed the West Coast hip hop group Mount Westmore with frequent collaborators Ice Cube, Snoop Dogg and E-40. In 2006, he founded the record label Up All Nite Records, through which he signed the hyphy group the Pack (which included then-unknown rapper Lil B).

== Early life ==
Shaw was born and raised in Los Angeles, California. In 1980, he and his family moved to Oakland. He was a drummer in the band at Fremont High School in Oakland.

== Career ==
In the mid-1980s, Shaw, along with high school friend Freddy B, produced custom songs (called "special requests") locally on cassette for people in Oakland and the Bay Area. In 1985, Too Short started his solo career and released his debut album, Don't Stop Rappin' on Oakland record label 75 Girls Records And Tapes which, along with four 12" releases, featured raw, simple drum beats from a LinnDrum drum machine. This was also one of the first hip hop recordings to use the word "bitch" – a word which became one of the rapper's trademarks and was the focus of subsequent songs such as "Ain't Nothin' but a Word to Me".

In the early 1990s, his self-produced beats came from mostly a TR-808 and from mid-to-late 2000s, a TR-909 was used. In 1983, Too Short and Freddie B. formed the label Dangerous Music to regionally distribute his music, and with others formed rap group the Dangerous Crew. Dangerous Music became Short Records, and then Up All Nite Records. With his 1989 album, Life Is... Too Short, he began using replayed established funk riffs (rather than samples) with his beats.

Subsequent work was primarily collaborative, including work with Tupac Shakur, the Notorious B.I.G., Scarface, and Pimp C. One of his notable collaborations during this period was on the track "The World Is Filled..." on the Notorious B.I.G. album Life After Death; he comes in on the third verse after Diddy and Biggie. Being featured on the album introduced him to a wider audience as well, due to his typical style contrasting greatly with the Mafioso theme of the album. He also appeared on TWDY's hit single "Player's Holiday" from their 1999 debut album Derty Werk as well as the Priority Records compilation Nuthin but a Gangsta Party. After these appearances, he began working on his eleventh album, Can't Stay Away. The album included guest appearances by 8Ball & MJG, Jay-Z, Jermaine Dupri, Sean Combs, E-40, Daz Dillinger, Lil Jon, Soopafly, Scarface and B-Legit.

Too Short relocated to Atlanta in 1994, but he did not begin working with a more diverse variety of Southern artists until 2000, when he collaborated with Lil Jon. With the 1999 release of Can't Stay Away, Too Short came out of retirement, continuing his sexually explicit, relaxed style of rap. New albums released 2000–2003 were You Nasty (2000), Chase the Cat (2001), What's My Favorite Word? (2002), and Married to the Game (2003). These albums all charted fairly well, as they all were in the top 71 of the Billboard 200, but they did not do as well as Too Short's earlier 1990s releases, as none of them reached the top 10.

For his next album, Blow the Whistle (2006), Too Short now took advantage of the new hyphy rap music that was emerging out of his original home base in Oakland. This saw somewhat of a resurgence for Too Short as it peaked at No. 14 on the Billboard 200, much better than each of his previous three releases. However, his subsequent releases, such as 2007's Get Off the Stage, have not been as successful. On October 7, 2008, Too Short was honored by VH1 at the fifth annual "Hip-Hop Honors" along with Cypress Hill, De La Soul, Slick Rick and Naughty By Nature.

In 2009, Too Short recorded for Daz Dillinger, Lil Jon, Soopafly, Scarface and B-Legit. In 2011, the rapper was featured on Wiz Khalifa's song "On My Level". He also collaborated in Snoop Dogg's 2011 album, Doggumentary in the song "Take U Home" and on the 50 Cent song "First Date". In 2012 Too Short along with E-40 released two collaboration albums on the same day titled History: Mob Music and History: Function Music. Both charted in the top 100 on the Billboard 200 albums chart. Too Short has said the best verse he has ever recorded is a verse for a song on Dr. Dre's Detox called "Man's Best Friend (Pussy)".

In 2013, it was announced he would collaborate with Lady Gaga on a song "Jewels n' Drugs" for her upcoming album Artpop. Also featured on the song are T.I. and Twista.

Six years after his last release, Too Short released his 20th album The Pimp Tape on November 9, 2018. On December 20, 2019, he released his 21st album The Vault. On December 18, 2020, Too Short and E-40 released their collaboration album Ain't Gone Do It and Terms & Conditions.

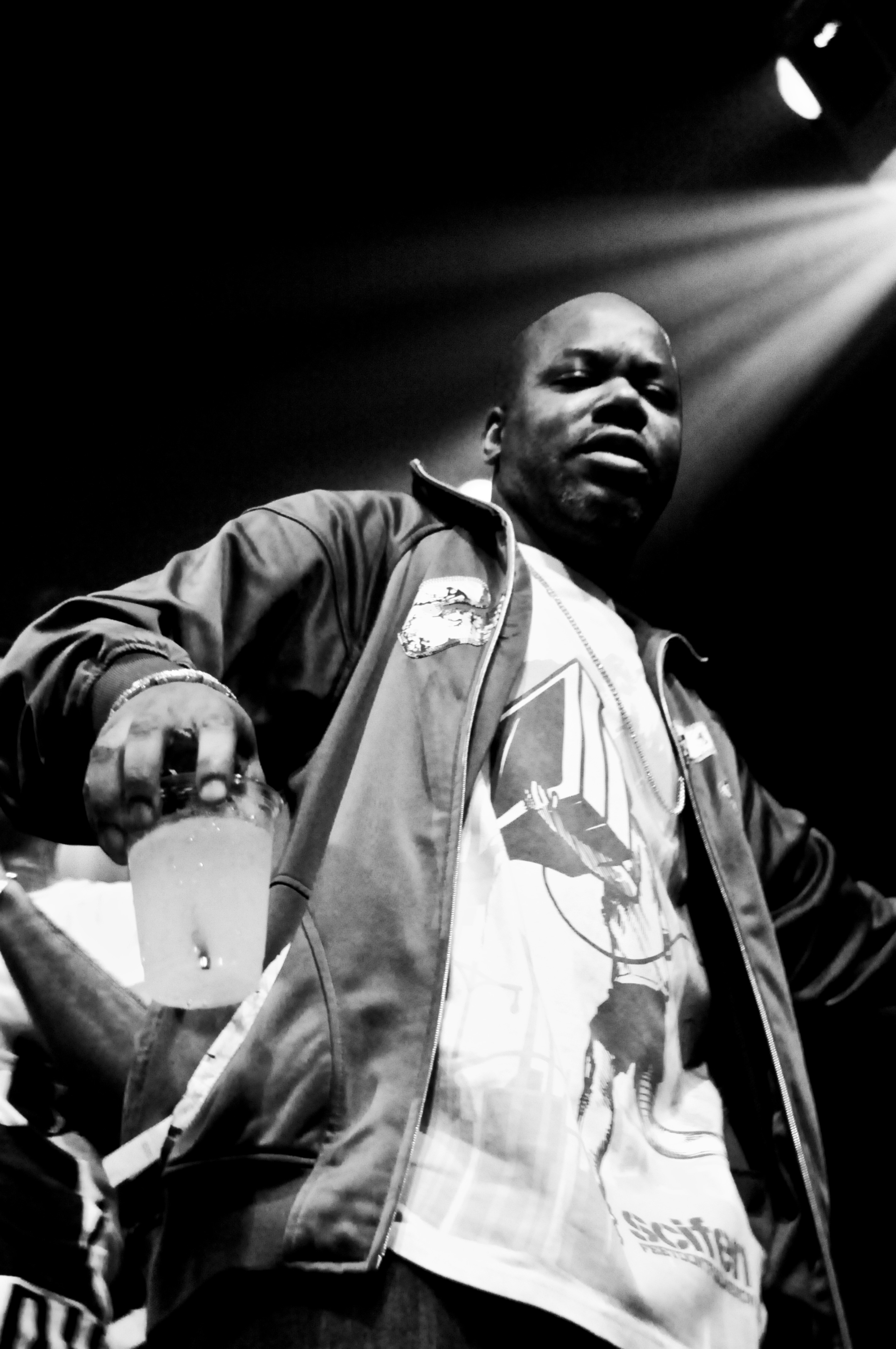
Too Short in 2008

In 2022, the City of Oakland honored Too Short with a commemorative street sign declaring a section of Foothill Boulevard "Too $hort Way" and proclaiming December 10, 2022 to be "Too $hort Day".

== Other ventures ==
In 2025, Too Short became part-owner of the Oakland Ballers in the Pioneer League, an independent baseball league.

== Up All Nite Records ==
In the mid-2000s, Shaw re-launched his Dangerous Music label into Up All Nite Records, a subsidiary imprint of Jive Records. He signed fellow California acts including the hip hop group the Pack. In 2017, he co-founded the "digital" record label OG Records with Vinny Az, which also aims as a platform for regional artists.

== Personal life ==
In September 2019, Shaw and his partner Sue Ivy announced the birth of their first child, a daughter.

Since 2006, Shaw has been a mentor at Youth UpRising, an Oakland-based non-profit which supports at-risk youths.

On January 29, 2025, Shaw's brother Wayne "LOC" Shaw was shot and killed in Oakland at the age of 61 during a botched robbery.

== Filmography ==
Too Short played the role of Lew-Loc in the film Menace II Society. Too Short has also worked in the adult film industry, with the 2003 film Get In Where You Fit In. Too Short was an interviewee in American Pimp. Too Short starred in and performed the music for America's Sexiest Girls 2003. Too Short has also appeared in an episode of The Game. Too Short made a cameo appearance in Jay-Z's video for the hit single, Big Pimpin'. Too Short was in VH1's Rock Doc, Planet Rock. Too Short made a cameo in the feature film Stop Pepper Palmer with Scott Schwartz.

Too Short released two straight-to-DVD films as well: 2001's Too Short Uncensored, produced by Jarrod Donoman and Terrell Taylor, the DVD Live Nationwide, and 2003's Too Short: Titty City, again produced by Taylor and partner Co Garrett.

Too Short was also featured in a 2009 episode of the E! show Kendra starring Kendra Wilkinson.

== Discography ==
Studio albums

- Don't Stop Rappin' (1983)
- Players (1985)
- Raw, Uncut & X-Rated (1986)
- Born to Mack (1987)
- Life Is... Too Short (1989)
- Short Dog's in the House (1990)
- Shorty the Pimp (1992)
- Get in Where You Fit In (1993)
- Cocktails (1995)
- Gettin' It (Album Number Ten) (1996)
- Can't Stay Away (1999)
- You Nasty (2000)
- Chase the Cat (2001)
- What's My Favorite Word? (2002)
- Married to the Game (2003)
- Blow the Whistle (2006)
- Get off the Stage (2007)
- Still Blowin' (2010)
- No Trespassing (2012)
- The Pimp Tape (2018)
- The Vault (2019)
- Sir Too $hort, Volume One (Freaky Tales) (2025)
- Sir Too $hort, Volume Two (Drink & Smoke) (2026)

Collaborative albums

- Dangerous Crew (with The Dangerous Crew) (1988)
- Don't Try This at Home (with The Dangerous Crew) (1995)
- History: Mob Music (with E-40) (2012)
- History: Function Music (with E-40) (2012)
- Ain't Gonna Do It/Terms and Conditions (with E-40) (2020)
- Snoop Cube 40 $hort (with Mount Westmore) (2022)
