= E-40 discography =

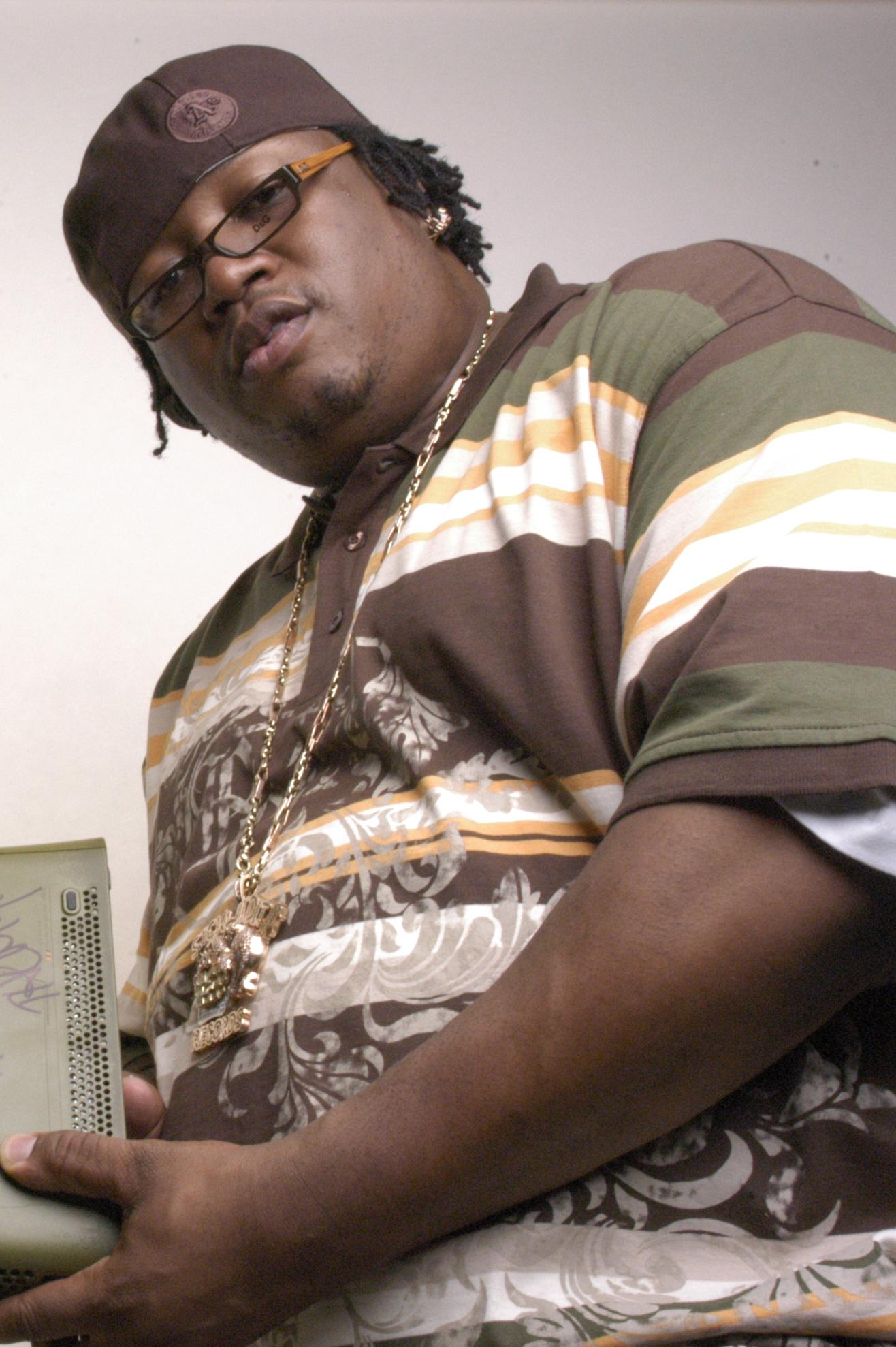
- E-40 in 2007
- Studio albums: 27
- Singles: 24
- Music videos: 69
- Collaborative albums: 9
- Featured singles: 11
- Guest appearances: 224

This is the discography of E-40, an American rapper from Vallejo, California.

== Albums ==
=== Studio albums ===
Title	Album details	Peak chart positions				Certifications
Title	Album details	US	US R&B	US Rap	US Ind.	Certifications
Federal	Released: November 10, 1992; Label: Sick Wid It, Jive; Format: CD, LP, cassette, digital download	—	80	—	—	
In a Major Way	Released: March 14, 1995; Label: Sick Wid It, Jive; Format: CD, LP, cassette, digital download	13	2	—	—	RIAA: Platinum
Tha Hall of Game	Released: October 29, 1996; Label: Sick Wid It, Jive; Format: CD, LP, cassette, digital download	4	2	—	—	RIAA: Gold
The Element of Surprise	Released: August 11, 1998; Label: Sick Wid It, Jive; Format: CD, LP, cassette, digital download	13	4	—	—	RIAA: Gold
Charlie Hustle: The Blueprint of a Self-Made Millionaire	Released: November 9, 1999; Label: Sick Wid It, Jive; Format: CD, cassette, digital download	28	2	—	—	
Loyalty and Betrayal	Released: October 10, 2000; Label: Sick Wid It, Jive; Format: CD, cassette, digital download	18	4	—	—	
Grit & Grind	Released: June 25, 2002; Label: Sick Wid It, Jive; Format: CD, cassette, digital download	13	5	—	—	
Breakin' News	Released: September 9, 2003; Label: Sick Wid It, Jive; Format: CD, cassette, digital download	16	4	—	—	
My Ghetto Report Card	Released: March 14, 2006; Label: Sick Wid It, BME, Reprise; Format: CD, LP, digital download	3	1	1	—	RIAA: Platinum
The Ball Street Journal	Released: November 24, 2008; Label: Sick Wid It, BME, Reprise; Format: CD, digital download	42	6	3	—	
Revenue Retrievin': Day Shift	Released: March 30, 2010; Label: Heavy on the Grind, EMI; Format: CD, LP, digital download	47	15	5	4	
Revenue Retrievin': Night Shift	Released: March 30, 2010; Label: Heavy on the Grind, EMI; Format: CD, LP, digital download	49	17	6	5	
Revenue Retrievin': Overtime Shift	Released: March 29, 2011; Label: Heavy on the Grind, EMI; Format: CD, digital download	42	13	7	9	
Revenue Retrievin': Graveyard Shift	Released: March 29, 2011; Label: Heavy on the Grind, EMI; Format: CD, digital download	40	12	6	8	
The Block Brochure: Welcome to the Soil 1	Released: March 26, 2012; Label: Heavy on the Grind, EMI; Format: CD, digital download	59	10	9	10	
The Block Brochure: Welcome to the Soil 2	Released: March 26, 2012; Label: Heavy on the Grind, EMI; Format: CD, digital download	58	9	8	9	
The Block Brochure: Welcome to the Soil 3	Released: March 26, 2012; Label: Heavy on the Grind, EMI; Format: CD, digital download	71	13	12	12	
The Block Brochure: Welcome to the Soil 4	Released: December 10, 2013; Label: Heavy on the Grind; Format: CD, digital download	136	19	7	18	
The Block Brochure: Welcome to the Soil 5	Released: December 10, 2013; Label: Heavy on the Grind; Format: CD, digital download	140	20	8	19	
The Block Brochure: Welcome to the Soil 6	Released: December 10, 2013; Label: Heavy on the Grind; Format: CD, digital download	151	21	9	20	
Sharp On All 4 Corners: Corner 1	Released: December 9, 2014; Label: Heavy on the Grind; Format: CD, digital download	61	8	4	7	
Sharp On All 4 Corners: Corner 2	Released: December 9, 2014; Label: Heavy on the Grind; Format: CD, digital download	197	19	12	13	
The D-Boy Diary: Book 1	Released: November 18, 2016; Label: Heavy on the Grind; Format: CD, digital download	178	13	6	15	
The D-Boy Diary: Book 2	Released: November 18, 2016; Label: Heavy on the Grind; Format: CD, digital download	—	14	7	16	
The Gift of Gab	Released: August 24, 2018; Label: Heavy on the Grind; Format: CD, digital download	125	38	—	20	
Practice Makes Paper	Released: July 26, 2019; Label: Heavy on the Grind; Format: CD, digital download	65	32	—	9	
Rule of Thumb: Rule 1	Released: November 17, 2023; Label: Heavy on the Grind; Format: CD, digital download	—	—	—	—	
Turning My Money Over	Released: August 28, 2026; Label: Heavy on the Grind; Format: CD, digital download	—	—	—	—	

=== Collaborative albums ===
Title	Album details	Peak chart positions			Certifications
Title	Album details	US	US R&B	US Rap	Certifications
Down and Dirty (with The Click)	Released: May 7, 1992; Label: Sick Wid It, Jive; Format: CD, LP, cassette, digital download	—	87	—	
Game Related (with The Click)	Released: November 7, 1995; Label: Sick Wid It, Jive; Format: CD, LP, cassette, digital download	21	3	—	RIAA: Gold
Money & Muscle (with The Click)	Released: September 25, 2001; Label: Sick Wid It, Jive; Format: CD, cassette, digital download	99	23	—	
History: Mob Music (with Too Short)	Released: November 6, 2012; Label: Heavy on the Grind, EMI; Format: CD, digital download	71	11	7	
History: Function Music (with Too Short)	Released: November 6, 2012; Label: Heavy on the Grind, EMI; Format: CD, digital download	62	9	6	
Connected and Respected (with B-Legit)	Released: April 6, 2018; Label: Heavy on the Grind; Format: CD, digital download	103	50	—	
Ain't Gone Do It/Terms and Conditions (with Too Short)	Released: December 18, 2020; Label: Trunk, 3T, Heavy on the Grind, Empire; Format: CD, digital download	—	—	—	
Snoop Cube 40 $hort (with Mount Westmore)	Released: December 9, 2022; Label: MNRK; Format: CD, digital download	188	—	—	
The Assembly (with The Assembly)	Released: May 7, 2026; Label: Sick Wid It; Format: CD, digital download	—	—	—	

=== Compilation albums ===
Title	Album details	Peak chart positions		
Title	Album details	US	US R&B	US Rap
The Hogg in Me (with Sick Wid It)	Released: November 21, 1995; Label: Sick Wid It, Jive; Format: CD, LP, cassette, digital download	—	36	—
Southwest Riders (with B-Legit)	Released: August 26, 1997; Label: Sick Wid It, Jive; Format: CD, LP, cassette, digital download	23	2	—
Sick Wid It's Greatest Hits (with Sick Wid It)	Released: November 9, 1999; Label: Sick Wid It, Jive; Format: CD, digital download	—	—	—
The Best of E-40: Yesterday, Today & Tomorrow	Released: August 24, 2004; Label: Sick Wid It, Jive; Format: CD, digital download	133	43	—
Fedi Fetchin (with The Sick Wid It Umbrella)	Released: March 25, 2005; Label: Sick Wid It; Format: CD, digital download	—	—	—
The Bay Bridges Compilation Vol. 1	Released: September 13, 2005; Label: Sick Wid It; Format: CD, digital download	—	—	—
The Machine (with The Sick Wid It Umbrella)	Released: March 18, 2008; Label: Sick Wid It; Format: CD, digital download	—	—	—
The Year of the Pig (with Sick Wid It)	Released: December 20, 2019; Label: Sick Wid It; Format: CD, digital download	—	—	—
Abundance (with Sick Wid It)	Released: February 3, 2023; Label: Sick Wid It; Format: CD, digital download	—	—	—
Hoggish Nights (with Sick Wid It)	Released: August 31, 2023; Label: Sick Wid It; Format: CD, digital download	—	—	—
High Frequency (with Sick Wid It)	Released: June 5, 2026; Label: Sick Wid It; Format: CD, digital download	—	—	—

== Extended plays ==
Title	EP details	Peak chart positions		
Title	EP details	US	US R&B	US Rap
Mr. Flamboyant	Released: May 11, 1991; Label: Sick Wid It; Format: Cassette, digital download	—	—	—
The Mail Man	Released: September 28, 1993; Label: Sick Wid It, Jive; Format: CD, cassette, digital download	131	13	—
Poverty and Prosperity	Released: November 20, 2015; Label: Heavy on the Grind; Format: Digital download	—	—	—
The Curb Commentator Channel 1	Released: May 8, 2020; Label: Heavy on the Grind; Format: Digital download	—	—	—
The Curb Commentator Channel 2	Released: July 31, 2020; Label: Heavy on the Grind; Format: Digital download	—	—	—

== Singles ==
=== As lead artist ===
Title	Year	Peak chart positions				Certifications	Album
Title	Year	US	US R&B	US Rap	UK	Certifications	Album
"Captain Save a Hoe" (featuring The Click)	1994	94	63	—	—		The Mail Man
"1-Luv" (featuring Levitti)	1995	71	51	4	—		In a Major Way
"Sprinkle Me" (featuring Suga-T)	1995	44	24	5	—		In a Major Way
"Things'll Never Change" (featuring Bo-Roc)	1996	29	19	4	114		Tha Hall of Game
"Rapper's Ball" (featuring Too Short and K-Ci)	1996	29	19	4	164		Tha Hall of Game
"Yay Deep" (with B-Legit and Richie Rich)	1997	—	—	—	—		Southwest Riders
"Hope I Don't Go Back"	1998	—	—	—	—		The Element of Surprise
"From the Ground Up" (featuring Too Short and K-Ci & JoJo)	1998	—	—	—	—		The Element of Surprise
"Big Ballin' with My Homies"	1999	—	—	—	—		Charlie Hustle: The Blueprint of a Self-Made Millionaire
"Nah, Nah..." (featuring Nate Dogg)	2000	—	61	—	—		Loyalty & Betrayal
"Automatic" (featuring Kokane and Fabolous)	2002	—	72	—	—		Grit & Grind
"Quarterbackin'" (featuring Clipse)	2003	—	108	—	—		Breakin' News
"Tell Me When to Go" (featuring Keak da Sneak)	2006	35	37	8	—	RIAA: Platinum	My Ghetto Report Card
"U and Dat" (featuring T-Pain and Kandi Girl)	2006	13	8	4	196	RIAA: 2× Platinum	My Ghetto Report Card
"Turf Drop"^{[A]} (featuring Lil Jon)	2008	—	107	—	—		non-album single
"Wake It Up"^{[A]} (featuring Akon)	2008	117	87	—	—		The Ball Street Journal
"Break Ya Ankles" (featuring Shawty Lo)	2008	—	90	—	—		The Ball Street Journal
"Bitch" (featuring Too Short)	2010	—	80	24	—		Revenue Retrievin': Day Shift
"My Shit Bang"	2011	—	73	—	—	RIAA: Gold	Revenue Retrievin': Graveyard Shift
"Function"^{[A]} (featuring YG, Iamsu! and Problem)	2012	121	62	22	—	RIAA: Gold	The Block Brochure: Welcome to the Soil 2
"Ripped" (featuring Lil Jon)	2013	—	—	—	—		non-album single
"All My Niggas" (featuring Danny Brown and Schoolboy Q)	2013	—	—	—	—		The Block Brochure: Welcome to the Soil 5
"Episode" (featuring Chris Brown and T.I.)	2013	—	—	—	—		The Block Brochure: Welcome to the Soil 4
"Red Cup" (featuring T-Pain, Kid Ink and B.o.B)	2014	—	—	—	—		Sharp on All 4 Corners: Corner 1
"Choices (Yup)"	2014	124	43	—	—	RIAA: 2× Platinum	Sharp on All 4 Corners: Corner 1
"Gamed Up" (featuring Rayven Justice)	2015	—	—	—	—		Poverty and Prosperity
"Chase The Money" (featuring Quavo, Roddy Ricch, ASAP Ferg and Schoolboy Q)	2019	—	—	—	—	RIAA: Gold	Practice Makes Paper
"1 Question" (featuring Chris Brown, Rick Ross and Jeremih)	2019	—	—	—	—		Practice Makes Paper
"It's Hard Not To" (featuring Sada Baby)	2022	—	—	—	—		non-album single

=== As featured artist ===
Title	Year	Peak chart positions			Certifications	Album
Title	Year	US	US R&B	US Rap	Certifications	Album
"I Got 5 on It (Bay Ballas Remix)" (Luniz featuring Dru Down, E-40, Richie Rich, Shock G and Spice 1)	1995	—	—	—		non-album single
"Check It Out" (B-Legit featuring E-40 and Kurupt)	1996	—	—	—		The Hemp Museum
"Nobody Can Be You but You" (The Mossie featuring E-40)	1997	—	—	—		Have Heart Have Money
"Big Man" (A-1 featuring E-40)	1999	—	—	—		Mash Confusion
"Baller Blockin" (Cash Money Millionaires featuring E-40)	2000	—	123	—		Baller Blockin' (soundtrack)
"Snap Yo Fingers" (Lil Jon featuring E-40 and Sean P)	2006	7	1	1	RIAA: Platinum	non-album single
"Candy (Drippin' Like Water)" (Snoop Dogg featuring E-40, MC Eiht, Goldie Loc and Tha Dogg Pound)	2006	—	—	—		Tha Blue Carpet Treatment
"Oh Yeah (Work)" (Lil Scrappy featuring Sean P and E-40)	2007	113	60	20		Bred 2 Die, Born 2 Live
"Go Girl" (Baby Bash featuring E-40)	2010	111	—	23		Bashtown
"Up Out the Way" (Xzibit featuring E-40)	2012	—	—	—		Napalm
"Far Alone" (G-Eazy featuring E-40 and Jay Ant)	2014	—	58	—	RIAA: Platinum	These Things Happen
"I Don't Fuck with You" (Big Sean featuring E-40)	2014	11	1	1	RIAA: Diamond; BPI: Platinum; ARIA: 3× Platinum; MC: 3× Platinum; RMNZ: 3× Platinum	Dark Sky Paradise
"Saved" (Ty Dolla Sign featuring E-40)	2015	81	25	—	RIAA: Platinum; MC: Gold	Free TC
"Law" (Yo Gotti featuring E-40)	2016	79	29	20	RIAA: Platinum	The Art of Hustle
"I'm On 3.0" (Trae tha Truth featuring T.I., Dave East, Tee Grizzley, Royce da 5'9", Currensy, DRAM, Snoop Dogg, Fabolous, Rick Ross, Chamillionaire, G-Eazy, Styles P, E-40, Mark Morrison and Gary Clark Jr.)	2017	—	—	—		Tha Truth, Pt. 3
"Snack" (Flo Rida featuring E-40 and Sage the Gemini)	2019	—	—	—		non-album singles
"West Swing" (Apoki featuring E-40)	2022	—	—	—		non-album singles
"Brrr" (Prof featuring E-40)	2026	—	—	—		Bad Time Boy

== Other charted songs ==
Title	Year	Peak chart positions	Album
Title	Year	US R&B	Album
"Hope I Don't Go Back" (featuring Otis & Shug)	1998	40^{[A]}	The Element of Surprise
"Big Ballin with My Homies"	1999	105	The Blueprint of a Self-Made Millionaire
"Rep Yo City" (featuring Petey Pablo, Bun B, 8Ball and Lil Jon & the East Side Boyz)	2002	73	Grit & Grind and Kings of Crunk
"One Night Stand"	2003	108	Breakin News
"Act a Ass" (featuring Rankin Scroo)	2003	121	Breakin News
"Thick & Thin" (featuring Lil' Mo)	2004	120	The Best of E-40: Yesterday, Today & Tomorrow
"We In This Thang Breh" (featuring Turf Talk and Mistah F.A.B.)	2012	119	The Block Brochure: Welcome to the Soil 1
"Tryna Get It" (featuring T-Pain and Twista)	2012	94	The Block Brochure: Welcome to the Soil 2

== Soundtrack appearances ==
Title	Year	Other artist(s)	Album
"Hot Ones Echo Thru the Ghetto"	1995	The Click, Levitti	Tales from the Hood
"On the Grind"	1996	The Click, Mike Marshall	Original Gangstas
"Baller's Lady"	1996	Passion	The Great White Hype
"Fatal"	1996	—N/a	Phat Beach
"Gotta Have Game"	1996	The Click	Phat Beach
"Why You Wanna Funk?"	1996	The Click, Spice 1, Marcus Gore	High School High
"Every Year"	1997	—N/a	Rhyme & Reason
"Struggled & Survived"	1997	The Click, Levitti	Dangerous Ground
"Goal Tendin'"	1997	—N/a	Sprung
"(I'll Be Yo') Huckleberry"	1997	D-Shot, Levitti, The Saulter Twins	Booty Call
"Don't Blame It on Me"	1997	B-Legit	Booty Call
"Come On"	1997	B-Legit	I'm Bout It
"Watch Where You Lay Your Head"	1998	—N/a	The Big Hit
"The Corruptor's Execution"	1999	UGK, B-Legit	The Corruptor
"Bossin'"	2000	D-Shot, Levitti, Otis	Obstacles
"Sho 'Nuff'"	2000	Gibson	Obstacles
"Higher Power"	2000	Gibson	Obstacles
"So High"	2000	D-Shot, Kurupt, Too Short	Obstacles
"I'm Straight"	2000	—N/a	3 Strikes
"Comin' Up on Somp'n"	2001	Suga-T	Pootie Tang
"When the Guns Come Out"	2004	The Reverend William Burke, Christ Bearer, WC	Blade: Trinity
"Baller Blockin'" (Game Version)	2006	San Quinn	NBA 2K7
"Captain Save a Hoe"	2013	The Click	Grand Theft Auto V

== Guest appearances ==
Title	Year	Other artist(s)	Album
"V-Town"	1992	N2Deep, B-Legit	Back to the Hotel
"This Type a Shit"	1993	Rhythm X	Long Overdue
"Livin' for the Weekend"	1993	Suga-T	It's All Good
"Mo' Mail"	1993	Spice 1	187 He Wrote
"Punk Ass Nigga"	1993	D-Shot, Mac Shawn	The Shot Calla
"Crooked Cops"	1993	D-Shot, B-Legit	The Shot Calla
"Wheels"	1993	D-Shot, Mugzi	The Shot Calla
"Call Me on the Under"	1993	D-Shot	The Shot Calla
"Way Too Vicious"	1993	B-Legit	Tryin' to Get a Buck
"Late Nighter"	1993	B-Legit	Tryin' to Get a Buck
"Can't Fuck wit Me"	1993	B-Legit	Tryin' to Get a Buck
"Can't Stop Me"	1993	B-Legit, Levitti	Tryin' to Get a Buck
"Santa Rita Weekend"	1994	The Coup, Spice 1	Genocide & Juice
"How to Catch a Bitch"	1994	Celly Cel, Mugzi, T-Pup	Heat 4 Yo Azz
"Retaliation"	1994	Celly Cel	Heat 4 Yo Azz
"D Boyz Got Love for Me"	1994	Spice 1	AmeriKKKa's Nightmare
"Shimmy Shimmy Ya" (Remix)	1995	Ol' Dirty Bastard, MC Eiht	Shimmy Shimmy Ya 12"
"Friend or Foe"	1995	Eightball & MJG, Mac Mall, Big Mike	On Top of the World
"Tell Me What You Like"	1995	Dee Dee	Tell Me 12"
"Beware of Those"	1995	JT Tha Bigga Figga, Celly Cel	Dwellin' in tha Labb
"Exercise Yo Game"	1995	Coolio, 40 Thevz, Kam	Gangsta's Paradise
"Can U Feel It?"	1995	Spice 1, Young Kyoz, Audra Cunningham, Rick Cousins	1990-Sick
"Ain't Hard 2 Find"	1996	2Pac, B-Legit, C-Bo, D-Shot, Richie Rich	All Eyez on Me
"U Don't Wanna See Me"	1996	Suga-T	Paper Chasin'
"4 tha Scrilla"	1996	Celly Cel, B-Legit	Killa Kali
"It's Goin' Down (Remix)"	1996	Celly Cel, B-Legit, Mack 10, Rappin' 4-Tay	Killa Kali
"Baller's Lady"	1996	Passion	Baller's Lady / The Great White Hype (soundtrack)
"It's On"	1996	Richie Rich	Seasoned Veteran
"Dime a Dozen"	1996	Playaz Tryna Strive	All Frames of the Game
"Premeditation"	1996	Two-Illeven, 11/5	Ounce of Game
"No Slang"	1996	Off da Hook	Off da Hook
"Lords Number One"	1996	The Saulter Twins	Change
"Situation"	1997	Brotha Lynch Hung, First Degree the D.E., Twamp Dog	Loaded
"Duck"	1997	D-Shot, B-Legit	Six Figures
"Come and Get Some"	1997	SWV	Release Some Tension
"Can't Stop"	1997	Mack 10	Based on a True Story
"White Girl for Sale"	1997	The Mossie, Suga-T	Have Heart Have Money
"Highest Niggaz in the Industry"	1997	Luniz, B-Legit	Lunitik Muzik
"What's Wrong wit the Game"	1997	Rappin' 4-Tay	4 tha Hard Way
"Here We Go"	1997	Mystikal, B-Legit	Unpredictable
"Rollin 100's"	1997	3xKrazy, Harm, Mr. Spence	Stackin' Chips
"Gotta Make That Money"	1998	TQ	They Never Saw Me Coming
"Get Your Paper"	1998	Master P	MP da Last Don
"Why Must I Be Like That?"	1998	Celly Cel	The G Filez
"The Function"	1998	Celly Cel	The G Filez
"360°"	1998	Eightball, Rappin' 4-Tay, Spice 1, Otis & Shug	Lost
"Keep Hustlin"	1998	WC, Too Short	The Shadiest One
"40 & C-Bo"	1998	C-Bo	Til My Casket Drops
"J.A.Y.O. (Justice Against All Oppressors)"	1998	Jayo Felony, Ice Cube	Whatcha Gonna Do?
"Sucka Repellent"	1998	Suga-T	Mean Green: Major Players Compilation
"Pop Ya Collar"	1998	Messy Marv, San Quinn	Explosive Mode
"Pervin'"	1999	T.W.D.Y., Too Short	Derty Werk
"Mathematics"	1999	A-1, Phats Bossi, Nikki Scarfoze, Little Bruce	Mash Confusion
"Hood Ratz and Knuckleheads"	1999	B-Legit, D-Shot, Otis & Shug	Hempin' Ain't Easy
"Scared Man"	1999	B-Legit, The Mossie	Hempin' Ain't Easy
"We Starvin'"	1999	Krayzie Bone, Gangsta Boo	Thug Mentality 1999
"You Might Get Gee'd"	1999	Too Short, Daz Dillinger, Soopafly	Can't Stay Away
"Try Me"	1999	Bookie	Stressin
"Already Know"	2000	Do or Die	Victory
"Just Like Dope"	2000	Too Short	You Nasty
"Hard Life"	2000	TQ, The Gigis	The Second Coming
"Time Iz Money"	2001	Big Syke, DJ Quik	Big Syke Daddy
"Take a Look Around (Remix)"	2001	Limp Bizkit, 8Ball	New Old Songs
"Connected"	2001	Mitchy Slick	Trigeration Station
"Freakshow"	2001	918, B-Legit, E-40, Levitti	Reincarnated / Throwblock Muzic
"Please Believe It"	2001	Jayo Felony	Crip Hop
"No Dick at All"	2001	Mack 10	Bang or Ball
"Straight Fool"	2002	B-Legit	Hard 2 B-Legit
"Let's Go"	2002	The Game	You Know What It Is, Vol. 1
"Center of Attention"	2002	Messy Marv	Turf Politics
"Got It"	2002	Goapele	Even Closer
"Cali-O"	2002	Too Short, B-Legit, Ant Banks, D'wayne Wiggins	What's My Favorite Word?
"Boss to Preciseness"	2002	Jay Tee, Turf Talk	High Caliber
"Breathe"	2002	Blu Cantrell	—N/a
"The Way We Ball" (Remix)	2002	Lil Flip, Lil Ron, Yung Reed	—N/a
"Pop Lockin' II"	2002	Daz Dillinger, Kurupt, Goldie Loc, Master P, C-Murder, Silkk The Shocker, Snoop Dogg, WC	West Coast Bad Boyz, Vol. 3: Poppin' Collars
"Sick"	2002	Suga-T	West Coast Bad Boyz, Vol. 3: Poppin' Collars
"Speculationz"	2003	Twiztid	The Green Book
"We Right Here"	2003	Al Kapone, Budda	Memphis Drama Vol. 3: Outta Town Luv
"Double Fisted"	2003	Mack 10, The Mossie	Ghetto, Gutter & Gangsta
"Country Grammar" (Remix)	2003	Nelly	Da Derrty Versions: The Reinvention
"Godzilla"	2003	Pizzo	The Tribulation...
"Stop Callin'"	2004	Messy Marv	DisoBAYish
"In My Ride"	2004	Morris Day	Its About Time
"What If"	2004	Afroman	Afroholic... The Even Better Times
"Kalifornia G'z"	2004	Yukmouth, Crooked I, Nate da Nut	United Ghettos of America, Vol. 2
"E40 Choppin'"	2004	Lil Jon	Crunk Juice
"Hardway"	2004	San Quinn	I Give You My Word
"Take It Serious"	2004	Soz, Young Droop	The Initiative
"Neva B Right"	2005	Messy Marv, Yukmouth	Bandannas, Tattoos & Tongue Rings
"Keep It 100"	2005	Baby Bash, Bosko	Super Saucy
"Hustle" (Remix)	2005	Murs, Chingo Bling, John Cena	—N/a
"Nickel and Dime Gangsta"	2005	Casual	Smash Rockwell
"We So Cold"	2005	Ya Boy, Turf Talk	Rookie of the Year
"Big Time"	2005	Mistah F.A.B., Mac Dre, Messy Marv, Yukmouth, Mac Mall, Mr. Kee	Son of a Pimp
"Crush on You"	2005	Mistah F.A.B., Mac Dre, Messy Marv, Yukmouth, Mac Mall, Mr. Kee	Son of a Pimp
"Kicked Out the Club"	2005	Mistah F.A.B., Mac Dre, Messy Marv, Yukmouth, Mac Mall, Mr. Kee	Son of a Pimp
"Call Heaven"	2005	Mistah F.A.B., Mac Dre, Messy Marv, Yukmouth, Mac Mall, Mr. Kee	Son of a Pimp
"Super Sic Wit It"	2005	Mistah F.A.B., Turf Talk	Son of a Pimp
"Where's My Daddy"	2005	Mistah F.A.B., Mac Dre, Messy Marv, Yukmouth, Mac Mall, Mr. Kee	Son of a Pimp
"U R My Angel"	2005	Mistah F.A.B., Mac Dre, Messy Marv, Yukmouth, Mac Mall, Mr. Kee	Son of a Pimp
"Guess Who's Back"	2005	B-Legit	Block Movement
"Dat's My Part"	2006	DJ Shadow	The Outsider
"It's Okay (One Blood)" (Remix)	2006	The Game, Jim Jones, Snoop Dogg, Nas, T.I., Fat Joe, Lil Wayne, N.O.R.E., Jadakiss, Styles P, Fabolous, Juelz Santana, Rick Ross, Twista, Tha Dogg Pound, WC, Bun B, Chamillionaire, Slim Thug, Young Dro, Clipse, Ja Rule, Junior Reid	—N/a
"Jellysickle"	2006	Tech N9ne	Everready (The Religion)
"I Got Grapes"	2006	Nump, Stressmatic	The Nump Yard
"Talk Hard"	2007	Twista, Pitbull	Tailwinds, Vol. 2
"Can't Be Faded"	2007	Young Dre The Truth, Nate Dogg	—N/a
"Gumbo Pot"	2007	PSD, Keak da Sneak, Messy Marv	Da Bidness
"Doe Boy"	2007	Turf Talk, B-Legit	West Coast Vaccine: The Cure
"I Got Chips"	2007	Turf Talk	West Coast Vaccine: The Cure
"Popo's"	2007	Turf Talk	West Coast Vaccine: The Cure
"Sick Wid' It Is the Crew"	2007	Turf Talk	West Coast Vaccine: The Cure
"Stop Snitchin'"	2007	Turf Talk	West Coast Vaccine: The Cure
"Scraper 2 a Benz"	2007	The Federation	It's Whateva
"This My One"	2007	Too Short	Get Off the Stage
"2 Step" (Remix)	2007	Unk, T-Pain, Jim Jones	Beat'n Down Yo Block
"A Bay Bay" (The Ratchet Remix)	2008	Hurricane Chris, The Game, Lil Boosie, Birdman, Angie Locc, Jadakiss	51/50 Ratchet
"Shes All Mine"	2008	Nick Cannon, Bosko	—N/a
"She Bad"	2008	V Factory	These Are the Days
"All I Know"	2008	Keak da Sneak	Deified
"Crazy"	2008	Rory	—N/a
"The Bidness"	2008	Krizz Kaliko, DJ Chill	Vitiligo
"Get Silly" (Mr. ColliPark Remix)	2008	V.I.C., Soulja Boy Tell 'Em, Bun B, Pitbull, Polow da Don, Jermaine Dupri, Arab, Unk, Big Kuntry King, Tex James, Bubba Sparxxx	Beast
"Santana DVX"	2009	The Lonely Island	Incredibad
"N.A.S.A. Music"	2009	N.A.S.A., Method Man	The Spirit of Apollo
"Click Click"	2009	MSTRKRFT	Fist of God
"Exclusive Ownership"	2009	Busta Rhymes	—N/a
"Booty Call"	2009	BrokeNCYDE	I'm Not a Fan, But the Kids Like It!
"Used to Be"	2009	UGK, B-legit, 8Ball & MJG	UGK 4 Life
"Club Love"	2009	The Cataracs	—N/a
"Doe Doe"	2009	Krizz Kaliko	Genius
"Running Wild"	2009	Cunninlynguists	Strange Journey Volume Two
"Designer Drugz & Beatdownz"	2009	A-Wax, Gonzoe	Recession Proof
"Kush Is My Cologne"	2009	Gucci Mane, Bun B, Devin The Dude	The State vs. Radric Davis
"40 Dayz"	2009	Stormshadowz	—N/a
"Greatest Alive"	2009	The Jacka, Mitchy Slick, Jynx	Tear Gas
"Scopin' Out da Scene"	2009	Lil Boosie	—N/a
"ZipLock"	2010	Mac Wayne	—N/a
"You Don't Wanna Funk"	2010	Kutt Calhoun, BG Bulletwound	Raw and Un-Kutt
"Drinks R On Me"	2010	Mistah F.A.B.	Prince of the Coast
"Do It"	2010	Drew Deezy	As Real As It Gets
"Welcome to California"	2010	40 Glocc, Seven, Snoop Dogg, Xzibit, Too Short	—N/a
"Since the 90's"	2010	Pimp C, The Gator Main	The Naked Soul of Sweet Jones
"Treal"	2011	Keak da Sneak, P.S.D. Tha Drivah, Messy Marv, Nio Tha Gift	Da Bidness 2
"Out of Control"	2011	Moonshine Bandits	—N/a
"Feel N Like Pac"	2011	Philthy Rich	—N/a
"Knockin"	2011	Travis Barker, Snoop Dogg, Ludacris, Dev	Give the Drummer Some
"My Fuckin' House"	2011	Snoop Dogg, Young Jeezy	Doggumentary
"Pornographic"	2011	Tech N9ne, Krizz Kaliko, Snoop Dogg	All 6's and 7's
"Potion"	2011	Problem, Bad Lucc	—N/a
"On Dat Vodka"	2011	San Quinn, Goldy	—N/a
"Speakers on Blast"	2011	Game, Big Boi	The R.E.D. Album
"I'm Burnt" (Rick Rock: Yay Area Remix)	2011	Kurupt, Snoop Dogg, Daz Dillinger, Problem, The Federation	—N/a
"Nuthin"	2011	T-Pain, Detail	Revolver
"Money On the Floor"	2012	Too $hort	No Trespassing
"Money Machine"	2012	H-Ryda	H Ryda vs. The Planet
"She Gettin It"	2012	Cali Swag District	—N/a
"Fuckin Wit It"	2012	C-Bo	Orca
"Supa Dupa Star"	2012	Mistah F.A.B., Too Short	Beast Mode
"Cook Coke"	2012	J. Stalin, Stressmatic	Memoirs of a Curb Server
"Go!"	2012	Young Jeezy, YG	—N/a
"Energetik"	2012	Big Scoob, Kendrick Lamar	Dope Talk Volume 2
"Nasty"	2012	Problem, Bad Lucc	Welcome to Mollywood 2
"Knockin"	2012	Jeremih, YG	Late Nights With Jeremih
"All The Way 100"	2012	Clyde Carson	S.T.S.A. (Something To Speak About)
"Dope Boy"	2012	Black C	Still Ruthless
"Let It Go"	2012	Glasses Malone, Kid Ink	Glass House
"All the Same"	2012	Young Jeezy	It's Tha World
"Who Booty" (Remix)	2013	Jonn Hart	—N/a
"Go Get It"	2013	JAE E, Thaddeous Shade	—N/a
"Chose"	2013	Joe Moses, Ty$	From Nothing to Something 2
"Club Poppin'"	2013	Louie V Mob	New World Order
"Can't Touch This"	2013	Colette Carr	Skitszo
"R.I.P." (Remix)	2013	Young Jeezy, Snoop Dogg, Too Short	—N/a
"Chevy" (Remix)	2013	David Cash, Problem, Clyde Carson	—N/a
"In A Low Low"	2013	Kurupt, The Rejects	Money, Bitches, Power
"Do You Remember"	2013	Kurupt, Too Short	Money, Bitches, Power
"Paul Mack"	2013	Joie 13	13 Ravens
"Marathon"	2013	Mistah F.A.B., Clyde Carson	Hella Ratchet
"Geek Out"	2013	Wallpaper.	Ricky Reed Is Real
"FTP"	2013	Hot, Kool John	Dope
"T.W.D.Y."	2014	Iamsu!, Too Short	Sincerely Yours
"Mind Control"	2014	Big K.R.I.T., Wiz Khalifa	Cadillactica
"Earl Stevens"	2014	Rich Rocka, Droop-E	Allegiance
"No K"	2015	Tech N9ne, Krizz Kaliko	Special Effects
"Saturday"	2015	Warren G, Too Short, Nate Dogg	Regulate... G Funk Era, Pt. II
"I Luv the Bay"	2015	Rick Rock	Rocket
"PTSD"	2015	Murs	Have a Nice Life
"Outside"	2015	The Game, Lil Eazy-E, Mvrcus Black	The Documentary 2.5
"Striktly Business"	2015	Baeza	The Man
"10 Times"	2015	Freddie Gibbs, Gucci Mane	Shadow of a Doubt
"Neva in My Life"	2015	Show Banga	Mayor 4 Life
"Give It to Me"	2015	TeeFlii	Starr
"Nothing to Me"	2015	G-Eazy, Keyshia Cole	When It's Dark Out
"What We Been Doin'"	2015	B-Legit, Ted DiGTL	What We Been Doin
"Workout"	2015	B-Legit, T20AM	What We Been Doin
"Can't Do You"	2016	Lecrae	Church Clothes 3
"No Timeouts"	2016	Baby Bash, Marty Obey	Don't Panic, It's Organic
"Inside of the Groove"	2016	Rittz, Mike Posner	Top of the Line
"All the Way Up (Remix)"	2016	Fat Joe, Remy Ma, French Montana, Snoop Dogg, The Game	—N/a
"Double Tap"	2016	Snoop Dogg, Jazze Pha	Coolaid
"Dope Dealer"	2016	Schoolboy Q	Blank Face LP
"Back to Cali"	2016	PeeWee Longway	Longway Sinatra
"On All Mommaz"	2016	Mistah F.A.B., Keak da Sneak	Son of a Pimp, Pt. 2
"Tap In"	2016	AD, Sorry Jaynari, Nef the Pharaoh	By the Way
"WAM"	2016	Adrian Marcel, Wale	—N/a
"Ima Keep It Goin'"	2017	Keak da Sneak	Withdrawal
"Buy Back the Block (Remix)"	2017	Rick Ross, Nipsey Hussle, Slim Thug, Fat Joe	—N/a
"Charles Brown"	2017	G-Eazy, Jay Ant	The Beautiful & Damned
"Believe It"	2017	Cool Nutz, Drae Steves	Terrance
"Boss Up"	2017	Iamsu!	Boss Up
"Put Me on Somethin'"	2017	P-Lo	More Than Anything
"Coast 2 Coast"	2017	DJ Kay Slay, Troy Ave, 3D Na'tee	The Big Brother
"Got 2 Go"	2017	TeeCee, Wiz Khalifa	Realness Over Millions 2
"Lit"	2017	BLAQ TUXEDO	ABA (Art By Accident)
"She Ready"	2017	Clyde Carson	S.T.S.A. 2 (Something To Speak About)
"Bottle After Bottle"	2017	Yukmouth, Trevell, Winn Wade, Too Short	JJ Based On a Vill Story 2
"I Do What I Want"	2017	Droop-E	Trillionaire Thoughts
"It's Good to Live On"	2017	Droop-E	Trillionaire Thoughts
"Fail to Realize"	2017	Droop-E, Nef the Pharaoh, Bandz Talk	Trillionaire Thoughts
"Give Me a Light"	2017	Droop-E, Berner, ProHoeZak	Trillionaire Thoughts
"Jungle"	2017	Pitbull, Abraham Mateo	Greatest Hits
"Mail Long"	2018	Payroll Giovanni, Cardo	Big Bossin' Vol. 2
"Crawl Out the Water"	2018	The Coup	Sorry to Bother You
"Busy Body"	2018	Berner, TeeFLii, Too Short	The Big Pescado
"Saigon Velour"	2018	Ghostface Killah, Snoop Dogg	The Lost Tapes
"Slide"	2018	Curren$y, Ty Dolla $ign	Parking Lot Music
"Bands"	2018	Ziggy, Stresmatic	It Was a Hot Summer
"2 Dollar Bill"	2019	2 Chainz, Lil Wayne	Rap or Go to the League
"I Came Up"	2019	Casey Veggies, YG, Bino Rideaux	Organic
"Devil Eyes"	2019	Dave East, Mozzy	Survival
"Going Through It"	2019	Guapdad 4000, Nef the Pharaoh	Dior Deposits
"Like It"	2020	Maez301	Hasaan
"Undrunk"	2020	Chris Brown, Too $hort	Slime & B
"1980"	2020	Merkules	Apply Pressure
"Da Ghetto"	2020	Jeezy	The Recession 2
"What Happened"	2021	Papoose	February
"Ca$hland"	2021	YBN Nahmir, Too $hort	Visionland
"Never Runnin out of Money"	2021	Gucci Mane	Ice Daddy
"Now & Later"	2021	G-Eazy, ShooterGang Kony, DaBoii	These Things Happen Too
"Clydesdale"	2021	Tech N9ne	Asin9ne
"Thug Nigga Story"	2022	YoungBoy Never Broke Again	3800 Degrees
"La Vida"	2022	Snow Tha Product	Black Panther: Wakanda Forever
"She´s Sanctified"	2024	Ice Cube, Snoop Dogg, Too Short, October London	Man Down
"HELLA"	2026	The Game, RJMrLA, Serrin Joy, Mike & Keys	The Documentary III

== Music videos ==
- 1992: "Tired of Bein' Stepped On" (The Click featuring Levitti)
- 1994: "Captain Save a Hoe" (featuring The Click)
- 1994: "Practice Lookin' Hard"
- 1995: "Birds in the Kitchen" (C-Bo featuring E-40)
- 1995: "Sprinkle Me" (featuring Suga-T)
- 1995: "Shimmy Shimmy Ya (Remix)" (Ol' Dirty Bastard featuring E-40 & some West Coast G'z)
- 1995: "1-Luv" (featuring Levitti)
- 1995: "Dusted 'N' Disgusted" (featuring Spice 1, Celly Cel, Mac Mall, Levitti & Suga T)
- 1995: "I Got 5 on It (Remix)" (Luniz featuring E-40, Richie Rich, Spice 1 & Shock G)
- 1995: "Hurricane" (The Click)
- 1995: "Scandalous" (The Click featuring Roger Troutman)
- 1996: "Rapper's Ball" (featuring Too Short & K-Ci)
- 1996: "Check It Out" (B-Legit featuring Kurupt & E-40)
- 1996: "Things'll Never Change"
- 1997: "I'll Be Yo' Huckleberry" (D-Shot featuring Levitti & E-40)
- 1997: "Yay Deep" (with B-Legit & Richie Rich)
- 1997: "Nobody Can Be U but U" (The Mossie featuring E-40)
- 1998: "From the Ground Up" (featuring Too Short & K-Ci & JoJo)
- 1998: "Hope I Don't Go Back"
- 1999: "Big Ballin' with My Homies"
- 1999: "Big Man" (A1 featuring E-40)
- 2000: "Earl That's Yo' Life" (featuring Too Short & Otis & Shug) / "L.I.Q."
- 2000: "Nah, Nah..." (featuring Nate Dogg)
- 2000: "Behind the Gates" (featuring Ice Cube)
- 2001: "Say Dat Den" (The Click featuring Levitti)
- 2002: "Automatic" (featuring Fabolous)
- 2002: "Rep Yo City"/"Mustard & Mayonnaise"
- 2003: "One Night Stand" (featuring DJ Kayslay) / "Gasoline"
- 2003: "Quarterbackin'" (featuring Clipse)
- 2006: "Tell Me When to Go" (featuring Keak da Sneak)
- 2006: "U and Dat" (featuring T-Pain & Kandi Girl)
- 2008: "Wake It Up" (featuring Akon)
- 2008: "Got Rich Twice" (featuring Turf Talk)
- 2010:' "Bitch" (featuring Too Short)
- 2010: "Undastandz Me"
- 2010: "Over the Stove"
- 2010: "Lightweight Jammin" (featuring Clyde Carson & Husalah of Mob Figaz)
- 2010: "The Weedman" (featuring Stressmatic)
- 2010: "Can't Stop the Boss" (featuring Snoop Dogg, Too Short & Jazze Pha)
- 2010: "Spend the Night" (featuring Björk, Laroo, The DB'z, Droop-E & B-Slimm)
- 2010: "He's a Gangsta" (featuring Messy Marv, The Jacka & Kaveo)
- 2010: "Show Me What You Workin' Wit'" (featuring Too Short)
- 2010: "The Server"
- 2010: "Nice Guys"
- 2011: "My Lil' Grimey Nigga" (featuring Stressmatic)
- 2011: "My Money Straight" (featuring Guce, Black C & Young Jun3)
- 2011: "Me & My Bitch"
- 2011: "My Shit Bang"
- 2011: "Concrete"
- 2011: "I Love My Momma" (featuring R.O.D. & Mic Conn)
- 2011: "Fuck 'Em"
- 2011: "That Candy Paint" (featuring Bun B & Slim Thug)
- 2011: "Rear View Mirror" (featuring B-Legit & Stressmatic)
- 2012: "Function" (featuring YG, IAmSu & Problem)
- 2012: "They Point" (featuring Juicy J & 2 Chainz)
- 2012: "Fast Lane"
- 2012: "Be You" (featuring Too $hort & J Banks)
- 2012: "What Happened to Them Days" (featuring J Banks)
- 2012: "Zombie" (featuring Brotha Lynch Hung & Tech N9ne)
- 2012: "Catch a Fade" (featuring Kendrick Lamar & Droop-E)
- 2012: "What You Smokin" (featuring Snoop Dogg, Daz Dillinger, kurupt & Kokane)
- 2012: "Im Laced" (featuring Cousin Fik)
- 2012: "Turn It Up"
- 2012: "Wasted" (featuring Cousin Fik)
- 2012: "Function" (Remix) (featuring Problem Chris Brown, Red Cafe, Young Jeezy & French Montana)
- 2012: "Dump Truck" (with Too Short featuring Travis Porter & Yung Chu)
- 2012: "Ballin' Is Fun" (with Too Short featuring B-Legit)
- 2012: "Slide Through" (with Too Short featuring Tyga)
- 2012: "Money Motivated" (with Too Short)
- 2013: "Ripped" (featuring Lil Jon)
- 2014: "Red Cup" (featuring T-Pain, Kid Ink & B.o.B)
- 2015: "Choices (Yup)"

== Notes ==
- A. Peaked only on the Bubbling Under Hot 100 Singles or Bubbling Under R&B/Hip-Hop Singles charts, which are 25-song extensions of the Hot 100 and Hot R&B/Hip-Hop Songs charts respectively.
- A. Charted only on the Hot R&B/Hip-Hop Airplay chart.
