= The Element of Surprise =

Studio album by E-40
- Released: August 11, 1998
- Recorded: 1994, 1997–1998
- Genre: West Coast hip-hop
- Length: 107:59
- Labels: Sick Wid It; Jive
- Producers: Ant Banks (exec.); Big Tyme; Bosko; Dave Everingham; E-40 (exec.); Funk Daddy; Keith Kinlow; Mike Mosley; Rick Rock; Sam Bostic; Studio Ton; Tone Capone

E-40 chronology
Tha Hall of Game (1996)	The Element of Surprise (1998)	Charlie Hustle: The Blueprint of a Self-Made Millionaire (1999)

Singles from The Element of Surprise
- 1. "Hope I Don't Go Back" Released: July 30, 1998; 2. "From the Ground Up" Released: November 12, 1998

Professional ratings
Review scores
Source	Rating
AllMusic	2.5/5 stars
Melody Maker	4/5 stars
The Source	4/5 stars

The Element of Surprise is the fourth studio album by American rapper E-40. It was released on August 11, 1998, by Sick Wid It Records and Jive Records. The album features production by Ant Banks, Bosko, Mike Mosley, Rick Rock, Sam Bostic, Studio Ton and Tone Capone. It peaked at number 4 on the Billboard Top R&B/Hip-Hop Albums and at number 13 on the Billboard 200. The album features guest performances by fellow members of The Click: B-Legit, D-Shot and Suga-T, as well as Jayo Felony, C-Bo, Mack 10, WC, Busta Rhymes, Levitti and Master P. The second to last track, "Ballin' Outta Control", originally appeared on the 1994 extended play, The Mail Man.

Along with a single, a music video was produced for the song "Hope I Don't Go Back", featuring Otis & Shug. A second single, "From the Ground Up", was also released as a music video, featuring Too Short and K-Ci & JoJo. The album eventually went Gold. In 2013 E-40 ranked what he considers to be his ten best albums, and named The Element of Surprise as his best album overall.

== Commercial performance ==
The Element of Surprise debuted and peaked at number 13 on the Billboard 200, with first week sales nearing 78,000 units. To date, the album has been certified Gold by the RIAA for selling and shipping 500,000 copies.

== Track listing ==
Disc 1 (Yellow)
No.	Title	Writer(s)	Producer(s)	Length
1.	"The Element of Surprise"	Earl Stevens; Ricardo Thomas	Rick Rock	4:21
2.	"Trump Change"	E. Stevens; Randy Jefferson	Big Tyme	4:30
3.	"All Tha Time" (featuring B-Legit)	E. Stevens; Bosko Kante; Brandt Jones	Bosko	3:21
4.	"Dump, Bust, Blast"	E. Stevens; Kante	Bosko	4:11
5.	"Hope I Don't Go Back"	E. Stevens; Anthony Banks; Maurice White; Jon Lind	Ant Banks	4:38
6.	"$999,999 + $1 = A Mealticket"	E. Stevens; Thomas	Rick Rock	4:32
7.	"Money Scheme" (featuring Jayo Felony)	E. Stevens; Kante; James Savage	Bosko	6:20
8.	"Zoom"	E. Stevens; Kante; Lionel Richie; Ronald LaPread	Bosko	4:09
9.	"Mayhem" (featuring A-1)	E. Stevens; Thomas; Dondrae Jones; T. Langford	Rick Rock	5:09
10.	"Personal" (featuring D-Shot, Suga T, The Mossie, and Levitti)	E. Stevens; Marvin Whitemon; Kevin Davis; Dulon Stevens; Danell Stevens; Marcus Taplon; Tenina Stevens; Lewis King	Studio Ton	4:31
11.	"My Hoodlumz & My Thugz" (featuring Mack 10 and WC)	E. Stevens; Keith Kinlow; Dedrick Rolison; DeShawn Dawson; William Calhoun	Keith Kinlow	4:44

Disc 2 (Orange)
No.	Title	Writer(s)	Producer(s)	Length
1.	"Do It to Me" (featuring Busta Rhymes)	E. Stevens; Anthony Gilmour; Vernon Burch; Trevor Smith	Tone Capone	3:40
2.	"Lieutenant Roast a Botch" (featuring Sylk-E. Fyne)	E. Stevens; Whitemon; E. Reynolds; Kevin McCord	Studio Ton	4:41
3.	"It's On, On Sight" (featuring C-Bo)	E. Stevens; Greg Buren; Shawn Thomas	Funk Daddy	4:13
4.	"From the Ground Up" (featuring K-Ci & JoJo, and Too Short)	E. Stevens; Banks; Todd Shaw; Cedric Hailey; JoJo Hailey; Zane Grey; Len Ron Hanks; Arnold McCuller	Ant Banks	4:52
5.	"Flashin'"	E. Stevens; Whitemon	Studio Ton	4:54
6.	"Doin' Dirt Bad" (featuring B-Legit)	E. Stevens; Kante; B. Jones	Bosko	4:24
7.	"Broccoli"	E. Stevens; Banks; Larry Blackmon	Ant Banks	4:07
8.	"Jump My Bone"	E. Stevens; Kante; Dino Hawkins; Roger Troutman; Eric Vidal; Nick Vidal	Bosko	3:57
9.	"Back Against the Wall" (featuring Master P)	E. Stevens; Kante; Percy Miller	Bosko	4:16
10.	"To Da Beat"	E. Stevens; Whitemon	Studio Ton	4:12
11.	"Dirty Deeds"	E. Stevens; Dave Everingham	E-40; Dave Everingham	3:46
12.	"Ballin' Outta Control"	E. Stevens; Sam Bostic; King; Mike Mosley	Mike Mosley; Sam Bostic	4:22
13.	"One More Gen"	E. Stevens; Bostic	Sam Bostic	6:09

Sample credits

- "The Element of Surprise" contains a sample from "AmeriKKKa's Most Wanted", written by O'Shea Jackson, Keith Shocklee, and Eric Sadler, as recorded by Ice Cube.
- "Hope I Don't Go Back" contains a portion of "Sun Goddess", written by Maurice White and Jon Lind.
- "Do It to Me" contains a portion of "Do It to Me", written by Vernon Burch.
- "Lieutenant Roast a Botch" contains:
  - "Don't Fight the Feeling", written by Kevin McCord.
  - "Captain Save a Hoe", written by Earl Stevens, Brandt Jones, Marvin Whitemon, Tenina Stevens, and Danell Stevens.
- "From the Ground Up" contains a portion of "Never Had a Love Like This Before", written by Zane Grey, Len Ron Hanks, and Arnold McCuller.
- "Broccoli" contains a portion of "Your Love Takes Me Out", written by Larry Blackmon.
- "Jump My Bone" contains:
  - "Paul Revere", written by Rick Rubin, Joseph Simmons, and Darryl McDaniels, as recorded by the Beastie Boys.
  - "Pistolgrip Pump", written by Dino Hawkins, Roger Troutman, Eric Vidal, and Nick Vidal.

== Charts ==
=== Weekly charts ===
Chart (1998)	Peak position
US Billboard 200	13
US Top R&B/Hip-Hop Albums (Billboard)	4

=== Year-end charts ===
Chart (1998)	Position
US Top R&B/Hip-Hop Albums (Billboard)	89

== Certifications ==
Region	Certification	Certified units/sales
United States (RIAA)	Gold	500,000^{^}
^{^} Shipments figures based on certification alone.
