= Loyalty and Betrayal (E-40 album) =

Studio album by E-40
- Released: October 10, 2000
- Recorded: 1999–2000
- Studios: The Orange Room (Danville, CA); The Cosmic Slop Shop (California); Infinite Studios (Alameda, CA); Bosko's Digital Chicken And Beats (Los Angeles, CA); Doppler Studios (Atlanta, GA); Mizery Studios (Kansas City, MO); The Plant Studios (California); EMI Studios (Los Angeles, CA); Tree Sound Studios (Atlanta, GA); Silk's House (West Los Angeles, CA)
- Genre: Hip hop
- Length: 1:05:40
- Labels: Sick Wid It; Jive
- Producers: Blaqthoven; Bosko; DJ Battlecat; DJ Silk; Don Juan; D-Wiz; Jazze Pha; Rick Rock; S.M.K. Sean Pross; Tone Capone

E-40 chronology
Charlie Hustle: The Blueprint of a Self-Made Millionaire (1999)	Loyalty and Betrayal (2000)	Grit & Grind (2002)

Singles from Loyalty and Betrayal
- 1. "Nah, Nah..." Released: September 26, 2000; 2. "Behind Gates" Released: December 20, 2000

Professional ratings
Review scores
Source	Rating
AllMusic	3/5 stars
HipHopDX	1.5/5
RapReviews	8/10

Loyalty and Betrayal is the sixth studio album by American rapper E-40. It was released on October 10, 2000, by Sick Wid It Records and Jive Records.

== Background ==
Recording sessions took place at The Orange Room in Danville, The Cosmic Slop Shop and The Plant Studios in California, Infinite Studios in Alameda, Bosko's Digital Chicken And Beats and EMI Studios in Los Angeles, Doppler Studios and Tree Sound Studios in Atlanta, Mizery Studios in Kansas City, and Silk's House in West Los Angeles.

Production was handled by Bosko, Rick Rock, Tone Capone, Blaqthoven, DJ Battlecat, DJ Silk, Don Juan, Jazze Pha, S.M.K. Sean Pross and D-Wiz, with E-40 serving as executive producer.

It features guest appearances from The Click, Nate Dogg, 8Ball, Al Kapone, Birdman, Ice Cube, Jazze Pha, Kokane, Levitti, Mack 10, Mugzi, Mystikal, Otis & Shug, Pastor Troy, Pimp C and Too $hort.

The album peaked at number 18 on the Billboard 200 and number 4 on the Top R&B/Hip-Hop Albums in the United States. It was supported with two singles with accompanying music videos: "Nah, Nah...", which peaked at number 61 on the Hot R&B/Hip-Hop Songs, and "Behind Gates".

WC made a cameo appearance in the "Behind Gates" music video, while Ant Banks, JT the Bigga Figga, Mac Shawn and The Click were seen in "Nah, Nah..." music video.

== Track listing ==
No.	Title	Writer(s)	Producer(s)	Length
1.	"Intro"	Anthony Gilmour	Tone Capone	2:35
2.	"Loyalty & Betrayal"	Earl Stevens; Ricardo Thomas	Rick Rock	4:34
3.	"Lace Me Up" (featuring Suga-T)	E. Stevens; Tenina Stevens; Bosko Kante	Bosko	4:04
4.	"Ya Blind" (featuring 8Ball and Jazze Pha)	E. Stevens; Premro Smith; Phalon Alexander; Lee Dixon; Melissa Elliott; Antwan Patton; Timothy Mosley	Jazze Pha	4:28
5.	"Sinister Mob" (featuring Nate Dogg)	E. Stevens; Nathaniel Hale; Dajuan Cayson	Don Juan	5:01
6.	"Nigga Shit" (featuring Mack 10, The Click, and Levitti)	E. Stevens; Dedrick Rolison; Brandt Jones; Dannell Stevens; T. Stevens; Kante	Bosko	5:51
7.	"Nah, Nah..." (featuring Nate Dogg)	E. Stevens; Hale; Kevin Gilliam; Harry Palmer	DJ Battlecat	3:41
8.	"Pop Ya Collar" (featuring Otis & Shug, and The Click)	E. Stevens; Jones; D. Stevens; Anthony Gilmour; Kevin McCord	Tone Capone	4:04
9.	"Record Company (Skit)" (featuring D-Wiz, Almost High, and Jackie Childress)		D-Wiz	1:29
10.	"To Whom this May Concern"	E. Stevens; Anthony Ransom	Blaqthoven	4:10
11.	"Like a Jungle" (featuring Young Mugzi and Kokane)	E. Stevens; Dulon Stevens; Kante	Bosko	4:08
12.	"Behind Gates" (featuring Ice Cube)	E. Stevens; O'Shea Jackson; Thomas; Omar Helton	Rick Rock	4:12
13.	"Doin' the Fool" (featuring Too $hort, Pimp C, Pastor Troy, and Al Kapone)	E. Stevens; Todd Shaw; Chad Butler; Micah Troy; Alphonzo Bailey; Sean Pross	SMK	4:18
14.	"Flamboastin'" (featuring Baby)	E. Stevens; Bryan Williams; Russell Brown	DJ Silk	4:24
15.	"It's Pimpin'" (featuring Freaky)	E. Stevens; R. Scott; Thomas	Rick Rock	4:39
16.	"Clown wit' It" (featuring Mystikal)	E. Stevens; Michael Tyler; Kante; Helton	Bosko	4:02
Total length:				1:05:40

== Personnel ==
- Earl "E-40" Stevens – lead vocals (tracks: 2–8, 10–16), executive producer
- Tenina "Suga-T" Stevens – backing vocals (track 3), additional vocals (track 6)
- Premro "8Ball" Smith – additional vocals (track 4)
- Phalon "Jazze Pha" Alexander – additional vocals & producer (track 4)
- Nathaniel "Nate Dogg" Hale – lead vocals (track 5), additional vocals (track 7)
- Dedrick "Mack 10" Rolison – additional vocals (track 6)
- Brandt "B-Legit" Jones – additional vocals (tracks: 6, 8)
- Danell "D-Shot" Stevens – additional vocals (tracks: 6, 8)
- Lewis "Levitti" King – backing vocals (track 6)
- Otis Cooper – backing vocals (track 8)
- Rafael Howell – backing vocals (track 8)
- Dave "D-Wiz" Evelingham – voice & producer (track 9), recording (tracks: 1, 2, 5, 7, 8, 10, 12, 15), mixing (tracks: 1, 10, 12, 15)
- Almost High – voice (track 9)
- Jackie Childress – voice (track 9)
- Dulon "Mugzi" Stevens – additional vocals (track 11)
- Jerry Buddy "Kokane" Long Jr. – backing vocals (track 11)
- O'Shea "Ice Cube" Jackson – lead vocals (track 12)
- Todd "Too $hort" Shaw – vocals (track 13)
- Chad "Pimp C" Butler – vocals (track 13)
- Micah "Pastor" Troy – vocals (track 13)
- Alphonzo "Al Kapone" Bailey – additional vocals (track 13)
- Bryan "Baby"/"Birdman" Williams – lead vocals (track 14)
- R. Scott – additional vocals (track 15)
- Michael "Mystikal" Tyler – additional vocals (track 16)
- Anthony "Tone Capone" Gilmour – producer (tracks: 1, 8), recording (track 8)
- Ricardo "Rick Rock" Thomas – producer (tracks: 2, 12, 15), mixing (tracks: 2, 15), recording (tracks: 12, 15)
- Bosko Kante – producer & engineering (tracks: 3, 6, 11, 16)
- Kevin "DJ Battlecat" Gilliam – producer (track 7)
- Dajuan "Don Juan" Cayson – producer & recording (track 5)
- Anthony "Blaqthoven" Ransom – producer (track 10)
- Sean "SMK" Pross – producer (track 13)
- Russell "DJ Silk" Brown – producer & engineering (track 14)
- Michael Denten – mixing (tracks: 2, 5, 7, 8, 15)
- Dana Hendricks – recording (tracks: 3, 6, 11, 16)
- Kevin Parker – recording (track 4)
- Steve Fisher – recording (track 4)
- Josh Butler – mixing (track 4)
- Mark Rains – recording & mixing (track 13)
- Daniel Romero – mixing (track 14)
- Chaz Harper – mastering
- Elisa Garcia – art direction, design
- Jay Blakesberg – photography

== Charts ==
Chart (2000)	Peak position
US Billboard 200	18
US Top R&B/Hip-Hop Albums (Billboard)	4
