= Have Heart Have Money =

Studio album by The Mossie
- Released: August 26, 1997
- Recorded: 1996–1997
- Genres: West Coast hip hop, gangsta rap
- Length: 59:09
- Labels: Sick Wid It, Jive
- Producers: B-Legit (exec.), E-40 (exec.), DJ Xtra Large, K-Lou, Levitti, The Mossie, Rick Rock, Sean T, Studio Ton, Tone Capone,

The Mossie chronology
Have Heart Have Money (1997)	Point Seen, Money Gone (2001)

Singles from Have Heart Have Money
- 1. "Nobody Can Be You But You" / "Gotta Get That Scrill" Released: June 15, 1997

Have Heart Have Money is the debut album by American rap group The Mossie, released August 26, 1997 on Sick Wid It and Jive Records. It was produced by DJ Xtra Large, K-Lou, Levitti, The Mossie, Rick Rock, Sean T, Studio Ton and Tone Capone and executive produced by B-Legit and E-40. The album peaked at number 35 on the Billboard Top Heatseekers and at number 62 on the Billboard Top R&B/Hip-Hop Albums. It features guest performances by E-40, 187 Fac, Celly Cel, Levitti, B-Legit, and G-Note of Funk Mobb.

Along with a single, a music video was released for the song, "Nobody Can Be You But You", featuring E-40 and cameo appearances by B-Legit, Celly Cel, D-Shot and Suga-T.

The song, "N.S.R.", was originally released on the 1997 Sick Wid It Records compilation, Southwest Riders. Another song, "Show No Shame" was slightly altered and retitled from, "Get a Bar of This Game", when it first appeared on the Sick Wid It Records compilation, The Hogg in Me in 1995.

== Track listing ==
1. "This and That" (featuring Mr. Malik) – 4:24
2. "Gotta Get That Scrill" (featuring Suga-T) – 4:49
3. "Nobody Can Be You But You" (featuring E-40) – 3:48
4. "When I Say Jump" (featuring B-Legit) – 4:10
5. "N.S.R." (featuring Celly Cel) – 4:24
6. "Interlude #1 (Mama)" – 2:27
7. "Mama Used to Tell Me" (featuring Levitti) – 5:15
8. "White Girl for Sale" (featuring E-40 & Suga-T) – 4:14
9. "Interlude #2 (Cocktails)" – 0:58
10. "Later on at the Telly" – 4:07
11. "Players Roll" (featuring G-Note) – 4:37
12. "Strugglin'" (featuring Silk-E) – 4:30
13. "Show No Shame" – 4:46
14. "Black Ass" – 4:59
15. "Sick Wid It Shit" (featuring 187 Fac & Mistic) – 4:25

== Chart history ==
Chart (1997)	Peak position
U.S. Billboard Top Heatseekers	35
U.S. Billboard Top R&B/Hip-Hop Albums	62

== Personnel ==
- 187 Fac - Performer
- B-Legit - Vocals, Background Vocals, Performer, Executive Producer
- Big Lurch - Background Vocals
- Celly Cel - Performer
- DJ Xtra Large - Producer, Engineer, Mixing
- E-Way - Bass, Guitar
- E-40 - Vocals, Background Vocals, Performer, Executive Producer
- G-Man Stan - Engineer, Mixing
- G-Note - Vocals
- Indo - Mixing
- K Lou - Keyboards, Vocals, Producer, Drum Programming, Mixing
- Kaveo - Vocals, Background Vocals
- Keba Konte - Photography
- Ken Lee - Mastering
- Levitti - Keyboards, Background Vocals, Producer, Performer, Drum Programming, Mixing
- Mr. Malik - Vocals, Background Vocals
- The Mossie - Vocals, Producer
- Pleasure - Background Vocals
- Rick Rock - Keyboards, Background Vocals, Producer, Engineer, Drum Programming, Mixing
- Sean T - Producer
- Studio Ton - Keyboards, Producer, Engineer, Drum Programming, Mixing
- Suga-T - Background Vocals, Performer
- Tap Dat Ass - Vocals, Background Vocals
- Tone Capone - Background Vocals, Producer, Engineer, Mixing
- Young Mugzi - Vocals, Background Vocals
