= The Mossie =

American hip hop group

- Kaveo, Mugzi, and Tap Dat Ass

Background information
- Origin: Vallejo, California, United States
- Genres: West Coast hip-hop, rap, gangsta rap
- Years active: 1993–present
- Labels: Sick Wid It Records, Jive Records
- Members: Kaveo; Mugzi; Tap Dat Ass
- Website: Mugzi on Myspace

The Mossie was an American rap group from Vallejo, California, with members: Kaveo, Mugzi and Tap Dat Ass. They first appeared together on E-40's 1993 EP, The Mail Man. Before dropping their 1997 debut album, Have Heart Have Money, on Sick Wid It and Jive Records, they appeared together on several other Sick Wid It releases, including: The Hogg in Me, The Hemp Museum and Southwest Riders.

== Background ==
The Mossie's debut album, Have Heart Have Money, was released in 1997 on Sick Wid It and Jive Records. The album peaked at number 35 on the Billboard Top Heatseekers and at number 62 on the Billboard Top R&B/Hip-Hop Albums. It was executive produced by B-Legit and E-40 and features guest performances by Celly Cel, Levitti, 187 Fac, Silk-E, G-Note, B-Legit and E-40. Along with a single, a music video was released to promote the album, "Nobody Can Be You But You", featuring E-40 and cameo appearances by B-Legit, Celly Cel, D-Shot and Suga-T. The group then went on to appear on several Bay Area artists' albums and compilations, together as a group and as solo artists.

In 2001, the group resurfaced with their second studio album, Point Seen, Money Gone. It was produced by Ant Banks, Bosko, Kevin Gardner, Redwine, Sean T and Tone Capone. Three years later Young Mugzi (a.k.a. Mugzilla) dropped a soundtrack on his own label, 30-30 Records titled, Lifestyles of the Disobayish. The album features guest performances by Turf Talk, E-40, San Quinn, Celly Cel, Messy Marv, Spice 1, Laroo and The Mossie.

== Discography ==
=== Studio albums ===
- Have Heart Have Money (1997)
- Point Seen, Money Gone (2001)
- Soil Savvy (2006)

=== Solo projects ===
- Young Mugzi Presents - Lifestyles of the Disobayish (2005)

=== Guest appearances ===
- 1992: "Ballers" (Mugzi; from The Click album Down and Dirty)
- 1992: "Street Life" (Kaveo & Mugzi; from The Click album Down and Dirty)
- 1992: "Porno Star" (Kaveo; from The Click album Down and Dirty)
- 1993: "Drought Season" (Kaveo; from E-40 album Federal)
- 1993: "Let Him Have It" (Kaveo; from the E-40 album Federal)
- 1993: "Extra Manish" (Mugzi; from E-40 album Federal)
- 1993: "Tryin' to Get a Buck" (Kaveo; from the B-Legit album Tryin' to Get a Buck)
- 1993: "Wheels" (Mugzi; from the D-Shot album The Shot Calla)
- 1994: "Where the Party At" (from the E-40 album The Mail Man)
- 1994: "Raw Deal" (Kaveo; from the Little Bruce album XXXtra Manish)
- 1994: "How to Catch a Bitch" (Mugzi; from the Celly Cel album Heat 4 Yo Azz)
- 1994: "Pimp's, Playa's and Hustla's" (Kaveo; from the Celly Cel album Heat 4 Yo Azz)
- 1995: "Get a Bar of This Game" (from the Sick Wid It Records compilation The Hogg in Me)
- 1996: "Big Pimpin'" (interlude) and "9 Sexual" (interlude) [Kaveo; from the Playaz Tryna Strive album All Frames of the Game)
- 1996: "Neva Bite" (from the B-Legit album The Hemp Museum)
- 1996: "My Drinking Club" (Mugzi, also with Levitti; from E-40 album Tha Hall of Game)
- 1996: "It Is What It Is" (Kaveo; from E-40 album Tha Hall of Game)
- 1997: "N.S.R." and "Who Do I Trust" (from the Sick Wid It Records compilation Southwest Riders)
- 1997: "It's Ma Thang" (Kaveo; from the D-Shot album Six Figures)
- 1998: "45 Ways" (from the Taydatay album Anticipaytion)
- 1998: "Personal" (from the E-40 album The Element of Surprise)
- 1998: "Point Seen, Money Gone" (from the D-Shot compilation Boss Ballin' 2 - The Mob Bosses)
- 1998: "Can I Kick It?" (Mugzi; from the Celly Cel album The G Filez)
- 1998: "We Be All Over" (from the N2Deep album The Rumble)
- 1998: "Bay Area Playaz" (Kaveo; from the N2Deep album The Rumble)
- 1998: "What U Want" (from the Swerve Records compilation 3 Beam Circus)
- 1999: "Duckin' & Dodgin'" and "Gangsterous" (from the E-40 album The Blueprint of a Self-Made Millionaire)
- 1999: "Critic Killaz" (from the A-1 album Mash Confusion)
- 1999: "Scared Man" (from the B-Legit album Hempin' Ain't Easy)
- 2000: "Make Dat' Skrill" (from the Suga-T album Gettin' It)
- 2000: "Like a Jungle" (Mugzi; from E-40 album Loyalty and Betrayal)
- 2002: "Shoe Strings" (Mugzi & Kaveo; from the Celly Cel album Song'z U Can't Find)
- 2002: "Side Show" (mugzi; from the Latino Velvet album Velvetism)
- 2003: "Double Fisted" (from the Mack 10 album Ghetto, Gutter & Gangsta)
- 2003: "Wa La" (from the E-40 album Breakin' News)
- 2006: "No Problems" (Kaveo; from the Celly Cel album The Wild West)
- 2009: "Krankin (3030/Sick Wid It RMX)" [Mugzi; from the Nump album Student ov da Game]
- 2010: "I'm in the Room" (Mugzi; from deluxe edition of E-40 album Revenue Retrievin': Day Shift)
- 2010: "He's a Gangsta" (Kaveo, also with Messy Marv & The Jacka; from E-40 album Revenue Retrievin': Night Shift)
- 2012: "Rollin'" (Mugzi, also with Raheem DeVaughn, Laroo T.H.H., Work Dirty, Droop-E & Decadez; from E-40 album The Block Brochure: Welcome to the Soil 1)
- 2012: "It's Curtains" (Kaveo, also with Droop-E; from E-40 album The Block Brochure: Welcome to the Soil 3)
- 2013: "Thanks for Lookin' Over Us" (Mugzi, also with Baby Bash & Paula DeAnda; from Jay Tee album The Game Is Cold)
- 2013: "Mobbin' Is My Profession" (Kaveo, also with Cousin' Fik, Work Dirty & Choose Up Cheese; from Droop-E album Hungry and Humble)
