= The Hogg in Me =

Compilation album by Various Artists
- Released: November 21, 1995
- Genre: West Coast hip hop, Gangsta rap
- Length: 58:28
- Label: Sick Wid It, Jive
- Producer: Celly Cel, Damian Law, Filthy Rich, Kevin Gardner, K-Lou, Levitti, Redwine, Stevie Wright, Studio Ton, Young Dog

Sick Wid It compilation chronology
The Hogg in Me (1995)	Southwest Riders (1997)

Professional ratings
Review scores
Source	Rating
Allmusic	3/5 stars

The Hogg in Me is compilation presented by American rap label Sick Wid It Records. It was released November 21, 1995, on Sick Wid It and Jive Records. The album was produced by Celly Cel, Damian Law, Dre "Young Dog" Riggins, Filthy Rich, Kevin Gardner, K-Lou, Levitti, Redwine, Stevie Wright and Studio Ton. It peaked at number 36 on the Billboard Top R&B/Hip-Hop Albums. The album features performances by B-Legit, Celly Cel, Levitti, Funk Mobb, The Mossie, Playaz Tryna Strive, A-1 and Reservoir Hoggz.

== Background ==
Several songs were reproduced on future Sick Wid It releases, including: "Time to Mobb" (It Ain't 4 Play), "Funk Season" (Killa Kali), "Feel Ness Real" (All Frames of the Game), "Can My Nine Get Ate" (The Hemp Museum), "Get a Bar of This Game" (Have Heart Have Money) and "Did Dat" (Paper Chasin'). The song, "Get a Bar of This Game" was slightly altered and retitled to, "Show No Shame", when it appeared on The Mossie's debut album in 1997.

Several new groups were introduced on this compilation that would go on to release albums in 1996–1997, including: Funk Mobb (G-Note, K-1 & Mac Shawn) who released It Ain't 4 Play in 1996, Playaz Tryna Strive (Filthy Rich & T-Pup) who released All Frames of the Game in 1996 and The Mossie (Kaveo, Mugzi & Tap Dat Ass) who released Have Heart Have Money in 1997. Although they appeared on several other Sick Wid It releases from the mid-to-late nineties, A-1 (Big Bone & D-Day) waited almost five years to release their debut album, Mash Confusion was released in the summer of 1999. Reservoir Hoggz (Paulay & Rhythm X) never released an album, although Rhythm X had previously released a solo album in 1994 titled, Long Overdue. Levitti was scheduled to release an album in the late nineties titled, So Fly, although that album never saw the light of day.

== Track listing ==
#	Title	Performers	Producer	Time
1	"Intro"	B-Legit	Studio Ton	2:43
2	"Time to Mobb"	Funk Mobb, Little Bruce, Levitti	Levitti, K-Lou	4:45
3	"Funk Season"	Celly Cel	K-Lou, Celly Cel	4:56
4	"Feel Ness Real"	Playaz Tryna Strive	Filthy Rich	3:49
5	"Can My Nine Get Ate"	B-Legit, Mac Shawn	Studio Ton	4:16
6	"All Work No Play"	A-1, Levitti	Stevie Wright, D. Jones, T. Langford	5:02
7	"Fortune Fuck the Fame"	Gangsta P	Studio Ton	3:48
8	"Get a Bar of This Game"	The Mossie	Studio Ton	4:46
9	"Come a New"	Levitti	Kevin Gardner, Redwine, Levitti	4:05
10	"Did Dat"	Suga-T, Levitti	E. Baker	3:58
11	"Dopefiction"	Reservoir Hoggz	K-Lou, R. Parker	4:46
12	"2 Major"	Young Dog	Dre "Young Dog" Riggins, Damian Law	4:17
13	"It's Going Down"	The Union	K-Lou	4:30
14	"Outro (Inst.)"		Studio Ton	2:49

== Charts ==
Chart (1995)	Peak position
U.S. Billboard Top R&B/Hip-Hop Albums	36

== Personnel ==
- A-1 – Performer
- B-Legit – Performer
- E. Baker – Guitar, Arranger, Keyboards, Producer, Engineer
- Celly Cel – Performer
- Filthy Rich – Producer
- D. Jones – Vocals
- John Kelly – Vocals
- Keba Konte – Photography
- Tim Langford – Vocals
- Levitti – Performer
- The Mossie – Performer
- P.T.S. – Performer
- Redwine – Producer
- Dre "Young Dog" Riggins – Arranger, Programming, Vocals, Vocals (background), Producer
- Lil G Saterfield – Vocals (background)
- Tony Smith – Photography
- D. Stevens – Vocals
- Studio Ton – Performer, Guitar, Arranger, Keyboards, Programming, Producer, Engineer, Mixing
- Suga-T – Performer
- B. Thurmon – Vocals
- The Union – Performer
- S. Wright – Keyboards, Producer
- Young Dog – Performer
