= Mr. Flamboyant =

EP by E-40
- Released: May 14, 1991
- Recorded: 1991
- Genre: Hip hop
- Length: 22:03
- Label: Sick Wid It
- Producer: Al Eaton; B-Legit; D-Shot; E-40

E-40 chronology
Mr. Flamboyant (1991)	Federal (1992)

Mr. Flamboyant is an extended play by American rapper E-40. It was released on May 14, 1991 by Sick Wid It Records. The album features production by B-Legit, D-Shot and E-40.

== Track listing ==
1. "Mr Flamboyant" - 5:53
2. "Tanji" - 1:33
3. "Club Hoppin'" - 4:44
4. "Shut It Down" - 3:39
5. "Tanji" (instrumental) - 1:31
6. "Club Hoppin'" (instrumental) - 4:43
