= Let's Side =

EP by the Click
- Released: 1990
- Genre: Hip-hop
- Length: 17:58
- Label: Sick Wid It
- Producer: Al Eaton, B-Legit, E-40, Mike Mosley

The Click chronology
The Kings Men (1988)	Let's Side (1990)	Down and Dirty (1992)

Let's Side is a four track EP released by the American rap group the Click. It was released by Sick Wid It Records in 1990 on LP and cassette.

== Track listing ==
1. "Let's Side" - 4:52
2. "Face the Facts" - 3:49
3. "Don't Stop the Music" - 4:12
4. "The Shit (That Will Drive You Insain)" - 5:05
