= The Shot Calla =

Studio album by D-Shot
- Released: June 7, 1993
- Recorded: 1992–1993
- Genre: Hip hop
- Length: 48:41
- Label: Sick Wid It/Jive
- Producer: Studio Ton

D-Shot chronology
The Shot Calla (1993)	Six Figures (1997)

Professional ratings
Review scores
Source	Rating
Allmusic	2.5/5 stars

The Shot Calla is the debut studio album by American rapper D-Shot. It was released on June 7, 1993, through Sick Wid It Records, and was entirely produced by Studio Ton. The album peaked at 52 on the Top R&B/Hip-Hop Albums and 32 on the Top Heatseekers. "Call Me on the Under" was released as a single and had a music video shot for it, but it failed to make it to any of the Billboard charts.

== Track listing ==
1. "Punk Ass Nigga"- 4:26 (Featuring E-40 and Mac Shawn)
2. "Crooked Cops"- 5:18 (E-40 and B-Legit)
3. "Wheels"- 3:35 (Featuring E-40 and Mugzi)
4. "The Shot Loves to Fuck"- 4:23
5. "When the Money Was Flowin'"- 4:16 (Featuring B-Legit)
6. "Cops Revisited"- 1:23
7. "Call Me on the Under"- 4:50 (Featuring E-40)
8. "You Ain't Shit"- 4:21 (Featuring Suga-T)
9. "Fuck a Ho"- 4:51 (Featuring B-Legit)
10. "Porno Star II"- 3:33
11. "Typical Night"- 3:42
12. "Player's Break"- 4:03
