= Southwest Riders =

Compilation album by E-40 & B-Legit
- Released: July 29, 1997
- Recorded: 1996–1997
- Genre: Hip hop
- Length: 127:28
- Label: Sick Wid It; Jive
- Producer: Alkatraz Productions; Big Rick; B-Legit (exec.); Bosko; Brotha Lynch Hung; Clint "Payback" Sands; Crazy C; DJ Paul; DJ Terraffying; D-Shot; E-40 (exec.); Gangsta; The Governor; Juicy J; KLC; K-Lou; Komacauszy; The Legendary Traxster; Levitti; Lil Ant; Phonk Beta; Pimp C; Race; Reg; Sam Bostic; Swoop G; Studio Ton; T-Mix; Tombstone

Sick Wid It compilation chronology
The Hogg in Me (1995)	Southwest Riders (1997)	Sick Wid It's Greatest Hits (1999)

Southwest Riders is a compilation album presented by American rappers E-40 and B-Legit. It was released on August 26, 1997, by Sick Wid It Records and Jive Records. The album features production by Bosko, DJ Paul, Juicy J, KLC, The Legendary Traxster, Sam Bostic, Studio Ton and T-Mix. It peaked at number 2 on the Billboard Top R&B/Hip-Hop Albums and at number 23 on the Billboard 200. The album features performances by Richie Rich, UGK, A-1, WC, 3X Krazy, Luniz, Celly Cel, Eightball & MJG, Twista and Brotha Lynch Hung.

A music video was produced for the song, "Yay Deep", featuring E-40, B-Legit and Richie Rich.

The song, "Represent" was also released as a music video to promote the compilation and later appeared on A-1's debut album, Mash Confusion. The video features cameo appearances by E-40, B-Legit, Celly Cel and Suga-T.

The song, "N.S.R.", was also released on The Mossie's 1997 debut album, Have Heart Have Money.

== Critical reception ==
Professional ratings
Review scores
Source	Rating
AllMusic	3/5 stars
RapReviews	8/10
The Source	3.5/5 stars

AllMusic's Leo Stanley called Southwest Riders "a fine collection of bass-driven Southern hip-hop" that focuses on "the deep, rumbling bass grooves" rather than individual artists. A reviewer for Rap Pages described it as a "28-song rainbow of gangsterism lifestyles". Miguel Burke, in his review for The Source, called Southwest Riders "an alliance of all-stars acts", criticizing some of the material for being monotonous. In a retrospective review, Pedro Hernandez of RapReviews praised Southwest Riders as a "near perfect double album", commending its "quantity, quality, and variety".

== Track listing ==
=== Disc one ===
#	Title	Performers	Producer
1	"Intro"	Herm	Race, Reg
2	"Represent"	A-1	Sam Bostic
3	"Walk With Me"	WC, CJ Mac	Clint "Payback" Sands
4	"Get Cha Mind Right"	Mystikal	KLC
5	"Big Bank"	Mr. Malik	Sam Bostic
6	"Paystyle"	918	DJ Terraffying
7	"Call The Coroner"	3X Krazy	Sam Bostic
8	"Cop Stories"	Graveyard Shift	Tombstone
9	"Capable"	Luniz	Bosko
10	"Flashin'"	Cydal, Swoop G	The Governor, Swoop G
11	"Ain't Fuckin' Around"	Ska-Face Al Kapone	Alkatraz Productions
12	"Respect It"	Celly Cel	K-Lou
13	"On Top of the World"	The Comrads	Gangsta
14	"Bad Bitches"	Suga-T, The Conscious Daughters	Levitti, Big Rick
15	"Playa Haters"	San Quinn, Messy Marv	K-Lou

=== Disc two ===
#	Title	Performers	Producer
1	"Mean Green"	Mean Green	
2	"Dis Year"	Tela	Crazy C
3	"Yay Deep"	E-40, B-Legit, Richie Rich	Studio Ton
4	"N.S.R."	The Mossie, Celly Cel	Studio Ton
5	"Hiside"	UGK	Pimp C
6	"About My Money"	Calvin-T	Sam Bostic
7	"Evil Ways"	Komacauszy, The Lost Mob	Komacauszy
8	"Niggas Talk Shit"	Eightball & MJG	T-Mix
9	"After Dollars No Cents"	Master P, Silkk the Shocker	K-Lou
10	"Y'all My Nugz"	Twista	The Legendary Traxster
11	"Tremendous"	Brotha Lynch Hung, Sicx, D-Dub, Tall Can	Brotha Lynch Hung, Phonk Beta
12	"Who Do I Trust"	D-Shot, The Mossie	D-Shot
13	"Threesixafix"	Three 6 Mafia	DJ Paul, Juicy J
14	"Load Unload"	Chilla Pertilla (Tha Chilla), Dope Spot	Lil Ant
15	"Getto Tales"	Cougnut, Baldhead Rick	Sam Bostic

== Chart history ==
Chart (1997)	Peak position
U.S. Billboard 200	23
U.S. Billboard Top R&B/Hip-Hop Albums	2
