= Money & Muscle =

Studio album by The Click
- Released: September 25, 2001
- Recorded: 2000–2001
- Genre: West Coast hip hop
- Length: 1:02:38
- Labels: Sick Wid It; Jive
- Producers: The Click (exec.); Ant Banks; Bink!; Bosko; DJ Fingaz; Rick Rock; Studio Ton; Tone Capone

The Click chronology
Game Related (1995)	Money & Muscle (2001)	The Best of The Click (2003)

Singles from Money & Muscle
- 1. "Say Dat Den" Released: September 11, 2001

Professional ratings
Review scores
Source	Rating
AllMusic	3/5 stars

Money & Muscle is the third and final full-length studio album by American hip hop group The Click. It was released on September 25, 2001, through Sick Wid It/Jive Records. Production was handled by Bosko, DJ Fingaz, Rick Rock, Studio Ton, Ant Banks, Bink! and Tone Capone. It features guest appearances from Birdman, Bosko, Levitti and WC. The album peaked at number 99 on the Billboard 200 and number 23 on the Top R&B/Hip-Hop Albums in the United States. Along with the single, a music video was released for the song "Say Dat Den".

== Track listing ==
No.	Title	Writer(s)	Producer(s)	Length
1.	"Sick Wid It Special" (Skit)			0:32
2.	"It's All the Same" (featuring Baby and WC)	Earl Stevens; Danell Stevens; Tenina Stevens; Brandt Jones; Bryan Williams; William Calhoun; Anthony Gilmour	Tone Capone	4:57
3.	"Say Dat Den" (featuring Levitti)	E. Stevens; D. Stevens; T. Stevens; Jones; Lewis King; Bill Houseman	DJ Fingaz	4:05
4.	"Victor Baron" (featuring Bosko)	E. Stevens; D. Stevens; Jones; Bosko Kante	Bosko	5:26
5.	"Issues"	E. Stevens; D. Stevens; King; Houseman; Aaron Yates; Quincy D. Jones	DJ Fingaz	3:49
6.	"The Dope Track"	E. Stevens; Kante	Bosko	4:25
7.	"Family"	E. Stevens; T. Stevens; Houseman	DJ Fingaz	4:33
8.	"Num Num Juice"	E. Stevens; D. Stevens; T. Stevens; Jones; Anthony Banks; Sylvester Levay; Michael Kunze	Ant Banks	4:12
9.	"Hector da Ho Protector"	E. Stevens; D. Stevens; T. Stevens; Jones; Marvin Whitemon	Studio Ton	3:57
10.	"Blowin' Hot Air"	E. Stevens; D. Stevens; T. Stevens; Jones; Ricardo Thomas; Houseman; Dulon Stevens; Kevin Davis; Whitemon	Rick Rock	5:30
11.	"Gimme Dat"	E. Stevens; D. Stevens; T. Stevens; Jones; Kante	Bosko	3:50
12.	"I Mean What Is It"	E. Stevens; D. Stevens; Jones; Thomas; Thomas Hudson	Rick Rock	4:17
13.	"Do da Damn Thang"	E. Stevens; D. Stevens; Jones; Roosevelt Harrell	Bink!	4:30
14.	"What You Gon Do About It"	E. Stevens; D. Stevens; Jones; Thomas	Rick Rock	3:17
15.	"Money Luv Us"	E. Stevens; D. Stevens; T. Stevens; Jones; Whitemon	Studio Ton	5:18
Total length:				1:02:38

Sample credits

- Track 5 contains a sample from "Questions" performed by Tech N9ne
- Track 8 contains a portion of "Son of a Gun" performed by Silver Convention
- Track 10 contains a sample from "Hot Ones Echo Thru the Ghetto" performed by The Click and a sample from "Mouthpiece" performed by E-40

== Chart history ==
Chart (2001)	Peak position
US Billboard 200	99
US Top R&B/Hip-Hop Albums (Billboard)	23
