= The Mail Man =

EP by E-40
- Released: September 28, 1993
- Recorded: 1992–1993
- Genre: Hip hop
- Length: 27:39
- Labels: Sick Wid It; Jive (reissue)
- Producers: E-40; Mike Mosley; Sam Bostic; Studio Ton

E-40 chronology
Federal (1992)	The Mail Man (1993)	In a Major Way (1995)

Singles from The Mail Man
- 1. "Captain Save a Hoe" Released: July 27, 1994

Professional ratings
Review scores
Source	Rating
AllMusic	3.5/5 stars

The Mail Man is an extended play by American rapper E-40. It was released on September 28, 1993 by Sick Wid It Records. The album features production by Mike Mosley, Sam Bostic, Studio Ton and E-40. It peaked at number 13 on the Billboard Top R&B/Hip-Hop Albums and at number 131 on the Billboard 200.

Along with a single, a music video was produced for the song, "Captain Save a Hoe", featuring The Click. Also released as a b-side on the same single, "Practice Lookin' Hard", was produced as a music video and features cameo appearances by Boots Riley, 2Pac, Celly Cel and Spice 1. "Ballin' Out of Control" was later re-released on E-40's 1998 double disc set, The Element of Surprise.

Jive Records reissued The Mail Man in 1994 with an alternate track listing.

== Track listing ==
=== Original Sick Wid It release ===
1st Day Mail
No.	Title	Length
1.	"Neva Broke"	6:45
2.	"Bring the Yellow Tape"	4:28
3.	"Practice Lookin' Hard"	4:36

2nd Day Mail
No.	Title	Length
4.	"Where the Party At" (featuring The Mossie)	4:55
5.	"Captain Save a Hoe" (featuring The Click)	4:47
6.	"The Mail Man"	4:21

=== Jive reissue ===
No.	Title	Length
1.	"Neva Broke"	6:45
2.	"Bring the Yellow Tape"	4:28
3.	"Practice Lookin' Hard"	4:36
4.	"Where the Party At" (featuring The Mossie)	4:55
5.	"Captain Save a Hoe" (featuring The Click)	4:47
6.	"The Mail Man"	4:21
7.	"Ballin' Out of Control" (featuring Levitti)	4:27
8.	"Captain Save a Hoe (Remix)" (featuring The Click)	4:48

== Charts ==
=== Weekly charts ===
Chart (1994)	Peak position
US Billboard 200	131
US Top R&B/Hip-Hop Albums (Billboard)	13
US Heatseekers Albums (Billboard)	25

=== Year-end charts ===
Chart (1994)	Position
US Top R&B/Hip-Hop Albums (Billboard)	68

=== Singles ===
Song	Chart (1994)	Peak position
"Captain Save a Hoe"	U.S. Billboard Hot 100	94
"Captain Save a Hoe"	U.S. Billboard Hot Dance Singles Sales	42
"Captain Save a Hoe"	U.S. Billboard Hot R&B/Hip-Hop Songs	63
