= Charlie Hustle: The Blueprint of a Self-Made Millionaire =

Studio album by E-40
- Released: November 9, 1999
- Recorded: 1998–1999
- Genre: Hip hop
- Length: 1:14:07
- Labels: Sick Wid It; Jive
- Producers: Ant Banks; Bosko; Clint "Payback" Sands; DJ Battlecat; Fingaz; Funk Daddy; Rick Rock; Studio Ton

E-40 chronology
The Element of Surprise (1998)	Charlie Hustle: The Blueprint of a Self-Made Millionaire (1999)	Loyalty and Betrayal (2000)

Singles from Charlie Hustle: The Blueprint of a Self-Made Millionaire
- 1. "Big Ballin' With My Homies" Released: 1999

Professional ratings
Review scores
Source	Rating
AllMusic	3.5/5 stars
The Source	3.5/5 stars

Charlie Hustle: The Blueprint of a Self-Made Millionaire is the fifth studio album by American rapper E-40. It was released on November 9, 1999, by Sick Wid It Records and Jive Records. Production was handled by Bosko, Ant Banks, Rick Rock, Clint "Payback" Sands, DJ Battlecat, DJ Fingaz, Funk Daddy and Studio Ton. It features guest appearances from The Click, The Mossie, A-1, B.G., Birdman, C-Bo, Fat Joe, Jayo Felony, Juvenile, Levitti, Lil' Wayne, Otis & Shug, Sauce Money, Too $hort, and contributions from Big Omeezy, Big Tray Deee, Celly Cel, Kokane, Nutt and Warren Mceanna.

The album peaked at number 28 on the Billboard 200 and number 2 on the Top R&B/Hip-Hop Albums charts in the United States. Music videos were directed for "Big Ballin' with My Homies" and "Earl That's Yo' Life/L.I.Q.".

The song "Ballaholic" would later be sampled in E-40's "I'm Laced", the title track from his 2012 album The Block Brochure: Welcome to the Soil 2.

== Track listing ==
No.	Title	Writer(s)	Producer(s)	Length
1.	"L.I.Q."	Earl Stevens; Kevin Davis; Dulon Stevens; Marcus Taplin; Bosco Kante	Bosko	4:56
2.	"Ballaholic"	E. Stevens; Davis; Ricardo Thomas	Rick Rock	5:14
3.	"'Cause I Can" (featuring Jayo Felony and C-Bo)	E. Stevens; James Savage; Shawn Thomas; Kante	Bosko	3:18
4.	"Get Breaded" (featuring Sauce Money and Fat Joe)	E. Stevens; Todd Gaither; Joseph Cartagena; Kevin Gilliam	DJ Battlecat	4:18
5.	"Look at Me" (featuring Juvenile, B.G., Lil Wayne, and Baby)	E. Stevens; Terius Gray; Christopher Dorsey; Dwayne Carter; Bryan Williams; Kante; Jeff Page; Joe Cooley; Rodney Oliver	Bosko	4:05
6.	"Duckin' & Dodgin'"	E. Stevens; Kante	Bosko	3:45
7.	"Fuckin' They Nose" (featuring The Click)	E. Stevens; Brandt Jones; Tenina Stevens; Dannell Stevens; Kante	Bosko	5:41
8.	"Seasoned"	E. Stevens; Otis Cooper; Rafael Howell; Gregory Buren; Charles Stepney; Maurice White; Philip Bailey	Funk Daddy	4:36
9.	"Earl, That's Yo' Life" (featuring Otis & Shug, and Too $hort)	E. Stevens; Todd Shaw; Cooper; Howell; Anthony Banks	Ant Banks	5:24
10.	"Rules & Regulations"	E. Stevens; R. Thomas	Rick Rock	4:43
11.	"Borrow Yo' Broad" (featuring B-Legit)	E. Stevens; B. Jones; Kante	Bosko	3:38
12.	"Do What You Know Good" (featuring Levitti)	E. Stevens; Lewis King; Warren Mceanna; Clint Sands	Mr. Payback	4:03
13.	"Mouthpiece"	E. Stevens; William Houseman	Fingaz	4:43
14.	"Big Ballin' with My Homies"	E. Stevens; Davis; D. Stevens; Taplin; Banks; Anthony Ray; A. Bailey	Ant Banks	3:57
15.	"Ghetto Celebrity" (featuring Suga-T)	E. Stevens; Marcellus McCarver; Marvin Whitemon	Studio Ton	4:17
16.	"Gangsterous" (featuring D-Shot and The Mossie)	E. Stevens; D. Stevens; Davis; D. Stevens; Taplin; Kante	Bosko	3:35
17.	"Brownie Points" (featuring A-1)	E. Stevens; Dondrae Jones; T. Langford; R. Thomas	Rick Rock	3:58
Total length:				1:14:07

== Charts ==
Chart (1999)	Peak position
US Billboard 200	28
US Top R&B/Hip-Hop Albums (Billboard)	2
