= Connected and Respected =

Studio album by E-40 & B-Legit
- Released: April 6, 2018
- Genre: Hip hop
- Length: 57:42
- Label: Heavy on the Grind

E-40 chronology
The D-Boy Diary: Book 2 (2016)	Connected and Respected (2018)	The Gift of Gab (2018)

B-Legit chronology
What We Been Doin (2015)	Connected and Respected (2018)

Professional ratings
Review scores
Source	Rating
HipHopDX	3.9/5
Pitchfork	6.7/10

Connected and Respected is a collaborative studio album by American rappers/cousins E-40 and B-Legit of The Click. It was released on April 6, 2018, by Heavy on the Grind Entertainment. It is featured guest appearances from Stressmatic of The Federation, P-Lo of The HBK Gang, Ocky, Uncle Murda, 4rAx, Decadez, JT The 4th, Prohoezak, Rexx Life Raj and The Click.

== Track listing ==
No.	Title	Producer(s)	Length
1.	"Life Lessons" (featuring Stressmatic)	DecadeZ	2:55
2.	"Straight Like That" (featuring Ocky)	DecadeZ	3:20
3.	"Boy" (featuring P-Lo)	P-Lo	3:41
4.	"Guilty By Association"	ToneBoneBeats	4:18
5.	"Carpal Tunnel"	Shonuff	3:30
6.	"Stompdown" (Skit 1)		0:20
7.	"Meet the Dealers" (featuring Stressmatic)	JPZ	3:48
8.	"Get It On My Own" (featuring Ocky)	Traxamillion	3:34
9.	"Up Against It"	M.A. Da Pilot	3:42
10.	"Fsho" (featuring JT the 4th)	Fre$h On the Beat	2:18
11.	"Whooped" (featuring DecadeZ)	DecadeZ	3:04
12.	"Tap In" (featuring Uncle Murda)	Myles William; 12 Keyz; Statz	3:16
13.	"You Ah Lie" (featuring 4rAx)	The Mekanix	4:30
14.	"Need to Know" (featuring Rexx Life Raj)	Cal-A	3:04
15.	"Stompdown" (Skit 2)		0:25
16.	"Bare"	Reece Beats	2:22
17.	"Barbershop" (featuring Stressmatic)	Reece Beats	3:36
18.	"Blame It" (featuring The Click)	The Mekanix	2:26
19.	"So High" (featuring Prohoezak)	ProHoeZak	3:33
Total length:			57:42

== Personnel ==
- Earl Stevens – main artist
- Brandt Jones – main artist
- Thomas Tremaine Jackson – featured artist (tracks: 1, 7, 17)
- Ocky – featured artist (tracks: 2, 8)
- Paolo Rodriguez – featured artist (track 3)
- JT The 4th – featured artist (track 10)
- Arcale Turner – featured artist (track 11)
- Leonard Carl Grant – featured artist (track 12)
- 4rAx – featured artist (track 13)
- Faraji Wright – featured artist (track 12)
- Simon McKinley – featured artist (track 19)

== Charts ==
Chart (2018)	Peak position
US Billboard 200	103
US Top R&B/Hip-Hop Albums (Billboard)	50
US Independent Albums (Billboard)	6
US Top Tastemaker Albums (Billboard)	8
