= It's All Good (Suga-T album) =

Studio album by Suga-T
- Released: April 16, 1993
- Studio: K-Lou Studios
- Genre: Hip-hop
- Length: 41:25
- Label: Sick Wid' It
- Producer: Studio Ton

Suga-T chronology
It's All Good (1993)	Paper Chasin' (1996)

Professional ratings
Review scores
Source	Rating
RapReviews	7/10

It's All Good is the debut solo studio album by American rapper Suga-T. It was released on April 16, 1993, through Sick Wid' It Records. Recorded at K-Lou Studios, it was entirely produced by Studio Ton.

The album was released prior to Sick Wid' It's distribution deal with Jive Records and did not receive much attention outside of the Bay Area, however it did spend two weeks on the US Billboard Top R&B Albums chart, peaking at number 88 in the week of May 22, 1993.

== Track listing ==
All lyrics are written by Tenina Stevens and Earl Stevens; all music is composed by Marvin Whitemon.

No.	Title	Length
1.	"Rockin' and Clockin'"	3:47
2.	"Billy Bad Ass"	4:26
3.	"Livin' for the Weekend"	4:28
4.	"I Ain't to Be Fucked With"	4:31
5.	"Check Ya Self"	3:15
6.	"It's All Good"	4:02
7.	"The Don't Knows"	4:21
8.	"Ms. Thang"	4:23
9.	"Back Stabbers"	3:32
10.	"Dap Do"	4:40
Total length:		41:25

== Charts ==
Chart (1993)	Peak position
US Top R&B/Hip-Hop Albums (Billboard)	88
