= E-40 =

American rapper (born 1967)

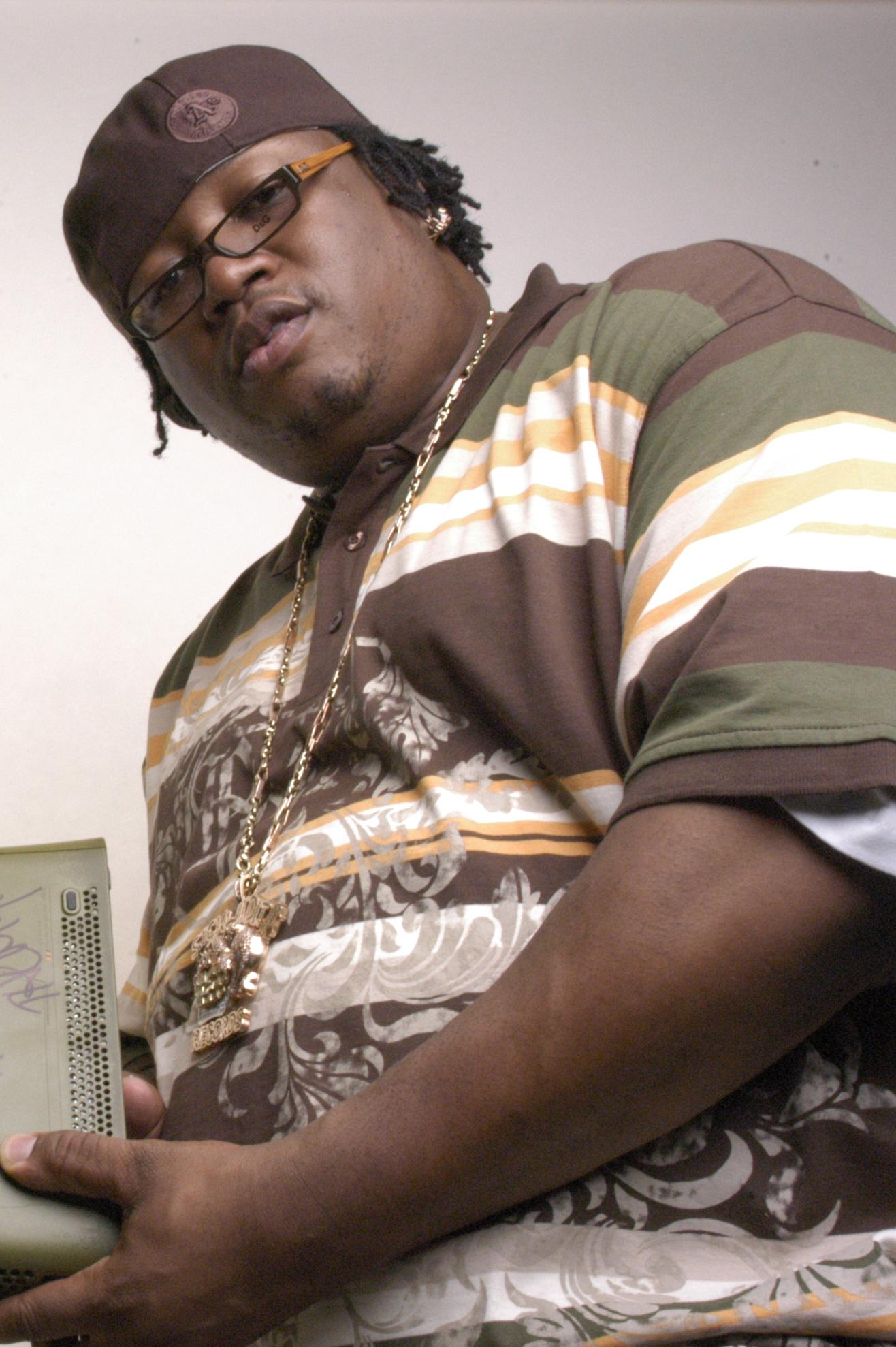
- E-40 in 2007

Background information
- Also known as: E-Feezable Belafonte Balogiono Bellwether
- Born: Earl Tywone Stevens; November 15, 1967 (age 58); Vallejo, California, U.S
- Genres: West Coast hip-hop; Bay Area hip-hop; gangsta rap; hyphy
- Occupations: Rapper; songwriter; entrepreneur; actor
- Years active: 1986–present
- Labels: Jive; Sick Wid It; Heavy on the Grind; BME; Reprise; EMI
- Member of: The Click; Mount Westmore
- Spouse: Tracey (m. 1991)
- Children: 2
- Website: e-40.com

Earl Tywone Stevens (born November 15, 1967), better known by his stage name E-40, is an American rapper. Stevens is a founding member of the rap group the Click and the founder of Sick Wid It Records. He has released 27 studio albums to date, appeared on numerous movie soundtracks, and has also done guest appearances on a host of other rap albums. Initially an underground artist, his 1995 solo album In a Major Way opened him up to a wider audience. Beginning in 1998, he began collaborating with mainstream rappers outside the San Francisco Bay Area. He rose to higher mainstream popularity in 2006 with his single "Tell Me When to Go", which was produced by Lil Jon.

== Early life ==
Stevens was born in Vallejo, California. He grew up with his siblings raised by a divorced mother who worked three jobs, and he became interested in hip-hop after hearing "Rapper's Delight" by the Sugarhill Gang. Beginning in fourth grade, Stevens played the snare and bass drum. He graduated from Hogan High School in Vallejo in 1985. Stevens played baseball in high school, recorded music with his siblings, and sold their recordings from the back of a car. After high school, Stevens enrolled at Grambling State University in 1986 with his cousin Brandt Jones and attended the school for one year.

== Music career ==
=== 1986–1999 ===
Stevens made his rap debut as E-40 in 1986 with his cousin B-Legit, sister Suga-T, and brother D-Shot in the group Most Valuable Players. After impressing fellow students with a rap remix of the school song and a Grambling State talent show, Most Valuable Players released a single, "The King's Men". The group later became the Click and released the EP Let's Side in 1990. The EP was co-produced by Mike Mosley and Al Eaton and was released on Sick Wid It Records, an independent label founded by E-40. In 1992 they released a second album, Down and Dirty, and in 1992 E-40 made his solo album debut. Federal, a nine-track LP/14-track CD produced by Studio Ton and released by Sick Wid It Records in association with SMG (Solar Music Group), a regional distributor.

In 1993, the Click had mainstream hit, "Captain Save a Hoe" (radio edit "Captain Save Them Thoe"). They moved back to Vallejo and teamed up with D-Shot, E-40's brother, to form the group MVP or Most Valuable Players. E-40's gospel singing uncle (Saint Charles) helped them put out the record. Suga-T was then added to the group to form the Click.

Although having a large following on the West Coast, E-40 did not have a large mainstream audience, so only two of his songs released under Jive Records, "1-Luv" featuring Levitti and "Things'll Never Change" featuring Bo-Roc, charted on the Billboard Hot 100. He had been working nearly exclusively with rappers from the Bay Area until 1997, when he released the double disc compilation Southwest Riders featuring exclusively rap acts from the Bay Area and the south. His collaboration with southern rappers continued in 1998, when he was given guest appearances on albums by Southern rappers, including Lost by Eightball, and MP da Last Don by Master P.

=== 2000–2010 ===
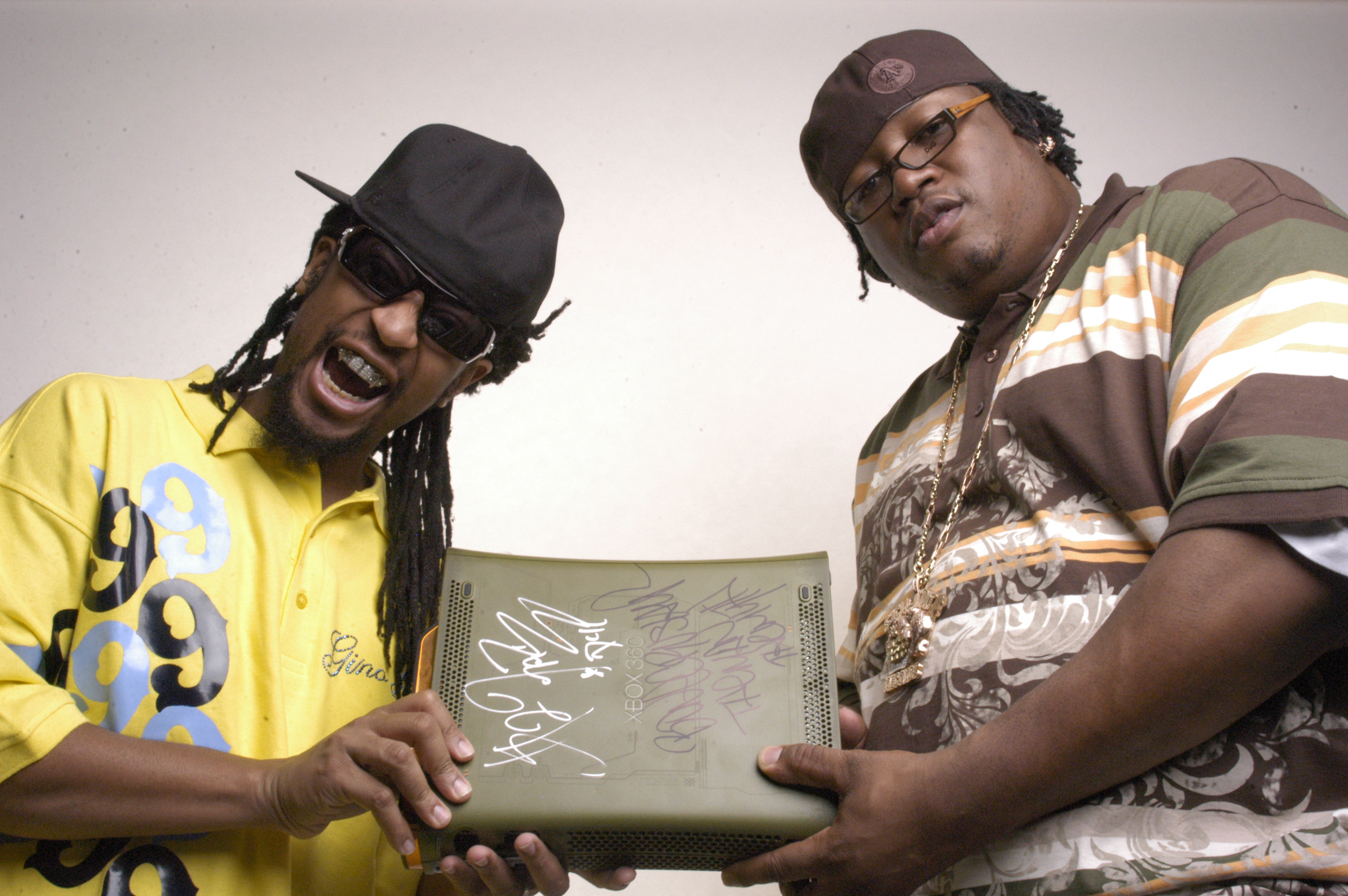
E-40 (right) with Lil Jon in 2007

In 2003 E-40 began hosting E-Feezy Radio, a weekly program on San Francisco hip-hop radio station KMEL that showcased Bay Area hip-hop. KMEL regularly broadcast the program until 2008. After completing a deal with Jive Records he signed with Lil Jon's BME Recordings and Reprise Records. After the signing, he appeared on Lil Jon's single "Snap Yo Fingers", also featuring Sean P of YoungBloodZ, which became a hit reaching the top 10 of the Billboard Hot 100. Afterwards, his single "Tell Me When to Go", featuring Oakland rapper Keak da Sneak, became popular throughout the United States, and E-40 appeared on MTV's Direct Effect and BET's 106 & Park. Publicity for E-40 was achieved through the MTV special My Block: The Bay. He later released "U and Dat" in April 2006, featuring T-Pain and Kandi Girl and produced by Lil Jon. His album My Ghetto Report Card debuted at No. 1 on the Top R&B/Hip-Hop Albums chart and No. 3 on the Billboard Hot 200 on March 14, 2006. Released through Sick Wid It/BME/Warner Bros. Records, the album was produced by Lil Jon, Rick Rock, and E-40's son, Droop-E. On March 30, 2010, E-40 released two albums called Revenue Retrievin': Day Shift and Revenue Retrievin': Night Shift. Both include guest appearances from Too Short, Snoop Dogg, Gucci Mane, Bobby V, and more. They debuted at numbers 47 & 49 respectively on the 200. The first single from the Day Shift album is "Bitch" featuring Too Short. On March 29, 2011, E-40 released two albums called Revenue Retrievin': Overtime Shift and Revenue Retrievin': Graveyard Shift. They include guest spots from Lil Jon, Bun B, Slim Thug, Tech N9ne & more. They both entered on the 200 chart at No's 42 and 40. In November 2010, E-40 and Too Short announced that they would release two collaborative album in Summer 2012 entitled History: Mob Music and History: Function Music. E-40 also performed at the Gathering of the Juggalos.

=== 2011–present ===
In 2012, E-40 released three solo albums: The Block Brochure: Welcome to the Soil series 1, 2, and 3, and released a collaboration album with Too Short. The first single from the second Block Brochure album is "Function" featuring YG, Iamsu! & Problem. It peaked at No. 21 on the Bubbling Under Hot 100 Singles chart, No. 62 on the Hot R&B/Hip-Hop Songs chart, and No. 22 on the Rap Songs chart, becoming his most successful single in years. The volumes include Snoop Dogg, Too Short, Kendrick Lamar, Juicy J, Tech N9ne, Twista, Brotha Lynch, Andre Nickatina, 2 Chainz, & T-Pain as guests. They each debuted at No's 58, 59 and 72 on the Billboard 200, respectively, and the triple album box set that contains all three Block Brochure volumes debuted at No. 44. History: Function Music debuted at No. 63 on the 200, while Mob debuted at No. 72. He made a cameo appearance in the music video for Young Jeezy's song "R.I.P." featuring 2 Chainz in March 2013, and was also featured on the song's official "G-Mix" also featuring Snoop Dogg and Too Short. It was revealed that the 4th, 5th and 6th editions of The Block Brochure would be released exactly one year after the release date of the first three volumes. However, there is no confirmed release date for the three albums, but the artwork for all three volumes and the triple album box set was released on June 12. On May 21, he released the first single from the three albums, "Ripped" featuring Lil Jon. On July 18, he premiered the second single "All My Niggaz" featuring Danny Brown and Schoolboy Q. The song was released to iTunes on August 20, 2013. On August 26, the video for "Off the Block" featuring Stressmatic and J. Banks was released and confirmed to be on the album. On Facebook E-40 announced that parts 4, 5 and 6 would be released on December 10, 2013. E-40 would be featured on Diamond certified single "I Don't Fuck with You" by American rapper Big Sean in 2014, peaking at number 11 on the US Billboard Hot 100.

In 2018, E-40 announced the "Definitions" album trilogy. He released his twenty-fifth studio album The Gift of Gab on August 23, which was followed by his twenty-sixth studio album Practice Makes Paper on July 26, 2019. The third album, Rule of Thumb, was released on November 17, 2023. In 2019, he made a guest appearance in the music video of "West Coast", performed by G-Eazy, Blueface, ALLBLACK and YG.

== Business career ==
Along with former NFL player Chester McGlockton, E-40 opened a Fatburger franchise in Pleasant Hill, California, which has now been shut down. E-40 has promoted a forthcoming publication, E-40's Book of Slang, since 1998, but as of 2024 the volume has not yet been released. He is also a spokesperson for Landy Cognac, and he opened the now-defunct Ambassador's Lounge, a nightclub in Downtown San Jose.

In late 2007, E-40 announced a new line of energy drinks called "40 Water." He also has a number of other ventures in the beverage industry, including the wine industry, where he has released three wines including a red blend called "Function," a moscato and high-alcohol fortified wine called "Mangoscato." The wines are branded using the rapper's real name, Earl Stevens. In December 2014, he released a premixed cocktail beverage called Sluricane Hurricane, inspired by the 1995 hit song "Hurricane" from his group the Click.

In December 2015, E-40 released a line of malt liquor called "E-40", available in 24 oz. cans and 40 oz. glass bottles.

E-40 is also an investor and has his own investment company. He was an early investor in social media apps Clubhouse and Convoz.

== Personal life ==
E-40 lives in Danville, California, with his wife Tracey. They married in 1991 and have two children who grew up to become rappers: Earl Jr. (who performs as Droop-E) and Emari (Issue).

E-40 is a longtime San Francisco 49ers, San Francisco Giants, Golden State Valkyries, and Golden State Warriors fan. The Giants gave away 15,000 bobblehead figures of him to visitors at a Giants game on June 25, 2022, where he also made the ceremonial first pitch of the game.

On February 14, 2026, E-40 accompanied Miami Heat forward Keshad Johnson at the NBA Slam Dunk Contest. A fellow Bay Area native, Johnson leapt over E-40 to successfully complete a cradle dunk. He attended the 2026 semi-finals Valkyries vs. Las Vegas Aces game in Las Vegas, where the Valkyries won, sending them to the finals.

== Discography ==
Studio albums

- Federal (1992)
- In a Major Way (1995)
- Tha Hall of Game (1996)
- The Element of Surprise (1998)
- Charlie Hustle: The Blueprint of a Self-Made Millionaire (1999)
- Loyalty & Betrayal (2000)
- Grit & Grind (2002)
- Breakin' News (2003)
- My Ghetto Report Card (2006)
- The Ball Street Journal (2008)
- Revenue Retrievin': Day Shift (2010)
- Revenue Retrievin': Night Shift (2010)
- Revenue Retrievin': Overtime Shift (2011)
- Revenue Retrievin': Graveyard Shift (2011)
- The Block Brochure: Welcome to the Soil 1 (2012)
- The Block Brochure: Welcome to the Soil 2 (2012)
- The Block Brochure: Welcome to the Soil 3 (2012)
- The Block Brochure: Welcome to the Soil 4 (2013)
- The Block Brochure: Welcome to the Soil 5 (2013)
- The Block Brochure: Welcome to the Soil 6 (2013)
- Sharp On All 4 Corners: Corner 1 (2014)
- Sharp On All 4 Corners: Corner 2 (2014)
- The D-Boy Diary: Book 1 (2016)
- The D-Boy Diary: Book 2 (2016)
- The Gift of Gab (2018)
- Practice Makes Paper (2019)
- Rule of Thumb: Rule 1 (2023)
- Turning My Money Over (2026)

Collaborative albums

- Down and Dirty (with The Click) (1992)
- Game Related (with The Click) (1995)
- Money & Muscle (with The Click) (2001)
- History: Mob Music (with Too Short) (2012)
- History: Function Music (with Too Short) (2012)
- Connected and Respected (with B-Legit) (2018)
- Ain't Gone Do It/Terms and Conditions (with Too Short) (2020)
- Snoop Cube 40 $hort (with Mount Westmore) (2022)
- The Assembly (with The Assembly) (2026)

== Filmography ==
=== Film ===
- Rhyme & Reason (1997)
- The Breaks (1999)
- 3 Strikes (2000)
- Obstacles (2000)
- Malibooty (2003)
- Hair Show (2004)
- Survival of the Illest (2004)
- Dead Heist (2007)
- The Adventures of Tha Blue Carpet Treatment (2008)
- Ghostride the Whip (2008)
- What Are the Chances? (2016)
- Don't Get Caught (2018)
- 16 Bars the Movie (2023)
- 88 Fresh (2023)

=== Television ===
- Incredible Crew
- The Jamie Foxx Show – season 5, episode 12
- MTV's My Block: Bay Area
- Hell's Kitchen
- Diners, Drive-Ins and Dives – season 28, episode 19 "Playin' Chicken"
- Blindspotting

== Sick Wid It Records ==
Sick Wid It
- Founded: 1989
- Founder: E-40
- Status: Active
- Distributor: Caroline Distribution
- Genre: West Coast hip-hop, hyphy
- Country of origin: United States
- Location: Vallejo, California

In 1989, E-40 formed independently-owned hip-hop record label Sick Wid It.

=== Notable artists ===
- E-40
- The Click
- B-Legit
- Turf Talk
- Stresmatic
- The Mossie (Kaveo, Mugzi & Tap Dat Ass)

=== Former ===
- Nef the Pharaoh
- OMB Peezy
- Al Kapone
- Celly Cel
- D-Shot
- Funk Mobb (G-Note, K-1 & Mac Shawn)
- Little Bruce
- Playaz Tryna Strive (Filthy Rich & T-Pup)
- Suga-T
- Mr. Malik

=== Discography ===
1990

- The Click – Let's Side

1991

- E-40 – Mr. Flamboyant

1992

- The Click – Down and Dirty
- E-40 – Federal

1993

- B-Legit – Tryin' to Get a Buck
- Suga-T – It's All Good
- D-Shot – The Shot Calla
- E-40 – The Mail Man

1994

- Celly Cel – Heat 4 Yo Azz
- Little Bruce – XXXtra Manish
- Rhythm X – Long Overdue

1995

- E-40 – In a Major Way
- The Click – Game Related
- Various Artists – The Hogg in Me

1996

- Suga-T – Paper Chasin'
- Celly Cel – Killa Kali
- Funk Mobb – It Ain't 4 Play
- Playaz Tryna Strive – All Frames of the Game
- E-40 – Tha Hall of Game
- B-Legit – The Hemp Museum

1997

- The Mossie – Have Heart Have Money
- E-40 & B-Legit Present – Southwest Riders

1998

- Celly Cel – The G Filez
- E-40 – The Element of Surprise

1999

- A-1 – Mash Confusion
- Celly Cel – The Best of Celly Cel
- E-40 – Charlie Hustle: The Blueprint of a Self-Made Millionaire
- Various Artists – Sick Wid It's Greatest Hits

2000

- B-Legit - Hempin' Ain't Easy
- E-40 – Loyalty and Betrayal
- E-40 – Charlie Hustle: The Blueprint of a Self-Made Millionaire (DVD Movie)

2001

- The Mossie – Point Seen, Money Gone
- The Click – Money & Muscle

2002

- Al Kapone – Goin' All Out
- E-40 – Grit & Grind
- B-Legit - Hard 2 B-Legit

2003

- E-40 – Breakin News

2004

- E-40 – The Best of E-40: Yesterday, Today & Tomorrow
- Turf Talk – The Street Novelist

2005

- Turf Talk – Brings the Hood Colabilation
- E-40 Presents – The Bay Bridges Compilation
- Various Artists – The Sick Wid It Umbrella: Fedi Fetchin

2006

- Droop-E & B-Slimm – The Fedi Fetcher & The Money Stretcher
- The Mossie – Soil Savvy
- D-Shot – Callin All Shots
- DB'Z – Speaking in Mannish
- Nump – The Nump Yard
- E-40 – My Ghetto Report Card

2007

- E-40 – The Best of E-40: Yesterday, Today and Tomorrow (Music video compilation)
- Turf Talk – West Coast Vaccine: The Cure

2008

- DB'Z – Mannish Music
- E-40 – The Ball Street Journal
- Laroo – The Corporation
- Nump – Student Ov Da Game
- Various Artists – The Sick Wid It Umbrella: The Machine
- Various Artists – 916 Unified

2010

- E-40 – Revenue Retrievin': Day Shift/Night Shift
- Droop-E – BLVCK Diamond Life
- Cousin Fik – No Gravity

2011

- E-40 – Revenue Retrievin': Graveyard Shift/Overtime Shift

2012

- E-40 – The Block Brochure: Welcome to the Soil 1/Welcome to the Soil 2/Welcome to the Soil 3
- Laroo and Turf Talk – Sick Wid It Block Op
- E-40 & Too $hort – History: Mob Music/Function Music

2013

- Droop-E – Hungry And Humble
- Hot (from the DB'z) – Dope
- E-40 – The Block Brochure: Welcome to the Soil 4/Welcome to the Soil 5/Welcome to the Soil 6

2014–2017

- E-40 – Sharp On All 4 Corners: Corner 1/Corner 2
- E-40 – The D-Boy Diary: Book 1/Book 2
- Nef the Pharaoh – The Chang Project
- Droop-E – Trillionaire Thoughts
- OMB Peezy – Humble Beginnings

2018

- Nef the Pharaoh – The Big Chang Theory
- James Too Cold – No Witness
- OMB Peezy – Loyalty Over Love

2019

- JT the 4th – Numba 4
- Droop-E – Droopiter
- OMB Peezy – Preacher to the Streets
- E-40 – Practice Makes Paper
- Nef the Pharaoh – Mushrooms & Coloring Books
- Various Artists – Year of the Pig
