= Mash Confusion =

Studio album by A-1
- Released: August 24, 1999
- Genres: Gangsta rap, G-funk, West Coast hip hop
- Length: 71:23
- Labels: Sick Wid It, Jive
- Producers: B-Legit (exec.), Bosko, E-40 (exec.), Funk Daddy, Jimmy Weaver, K-Lou, Sam Bostic, Studio Ton, Tone Capone

Singles from Mash Confusion
- 1. "Big Man" Released: 1999

Mash Confusion is the debut album by American rap group A-1, released August 24, 1999 on Sick Wid It and Jive Records. A-1 is composed of Big Bone and D-Day. The album features production by Bosko, K-Lou, Sam Bostic, Studio Ton and Tone Capone. Several guest performers appear on the album, including: E-40, B-Legit, Little Bruce, Killa Tay, Phats Bossi and Nikki Scarfoze.

Along with a single, a music video was produced for the song, "Big Man", featuring E-40.

The song, "Represent", originally appeared on the 1997 compilation album, Southwest Riders and was also released as a music video to promote the compilation. The video features cameo appearances by E-40, B-Legit, Celly Cel and Suga-T.

A-1 first appeared together on the 1995 Sick Wid It compilation album, The Hogg in Me, on the song, "All Work No Play".

== Critical reception ==
Professional ratings
Review scores
Source	Rating
Allmusic	4/5 stars

Allmusic - "Featured on Sick Wid It's Southwest Riders compilation barely a year before, A-1's album debut for the label is a bruising piece of midtempo G-funk, stacked with machine-gun percussion and A-1's slick raps. Though E-40 features on the best track, "The Big Man," there are plenty of great jams and spotlights for A-1, on "Gangstaz Anthem," "Mathematics," and "Represent."

== Track listing ==
1. "Intro" – 1:00
2. "Mathematics" (featuring E-40, Phats Bossi, Nikki Scarfoze & Little Bruce) – 6:04
3. "Keep It to Ya Self" (featuring Filthy Phil) – 5:10
4. "Gangsta's Anthem" (featuring Killa Tay) – 4:08
5. "Big Man" (featuring E-40) – 4:39
6. "What the Fuck Can I Do" – 4:47
7. "Critic Killaz" (featuring The Mossie) – 4:51
8. "Mash Confusion" – 3:26
9. "Struggle N' the Projects" (featuring Harm) – 3:53
10. "Represent" – 4:25
11. "Tryin' to Get It" (featuring B-Legit, Nikki Scarfoze & Mr. Malik) – 3:28
12. "Faces" – 4:19
13. "Niggaz Just Learn" – 4:03
14. "Keep Ya Thang" – 4:02
15. "Minor League Throwdown" (featuring Livin' Proof, K-Cree, I.Q. & A.D.) – 3:49
16. "Little 'Bout Me" – 4:10
17. "Twisted" – 3:57
18. "Outro" – 1:12
