= The Gift of Gab (album) =

Studio album by E-40
- Released: June 29, 2018
- Genre: Hip hop
- Length: 37:12
- Label: Heavy on the Grind
- Producer: E-40 (exec.)

E-40 chronology
Connected and Respected (2018)	The Gift of Gab (2018)	Practice Makes Paper (2019)

Professional ratings
Review scores
Source	Rating
HipHopDX	4.1/5
Robert Christgau	(2-star Honorable Mention)

The Gift of Gab is the twenty-fifth studio album by American rapper E-40. It was released on June 29, 2018, by Heavy on the Grind Entertainment. It features guest appearances from Cornel West, FMB DZ, G Perico, Mike Marshall, Kent Jones, Konshens, Problem, Rich Rocka, Sada Baby, Stressmatic, Ty Dolla $ign, Vince Staples and Yhung T.O.

The Gift of Gab is the first installment of a trilogy of albums called The Definition Series. The other two projects, Rule of Thumb and Practice Makes Paper, were planned on being released in October and December of the same year respectively, but the two albums were shortly after delayed. Practice Makes Paper was later released on July 26, 2019, while Rule of Thumb was announced to be a double album series, its first part, Rule of Thumb: Rule 1, was released on November 17, 2023.

== Track listing ==
No.	Title	Length
1.	"Ballhog" (featuring Stressmatic)	2:22
2.	"The Pots & Pan Man"	2:35
3.	"Winning"	2:42
4.	"Who You Talking To" (featuring Kent Jones)	3:14
5.	"Wicked" (featuring Rich Rocka)	2:35
6.	"Ain't Talkin Bout Nothing" (featuring G Perico and Vince Staples)	3:14
7.	"One Night" (featuring Konshens and Ty Dolla $ign)	3:55
8.	"Relax" (featuring Problem)	2:42
9.	"The Pack Attack" (featuring Sada Baby and FMB DZ)	4:14
10.	"Dennys"	2:28
11.	"These Days" (featuring Yhung T.O.)	2:42
12.	"When Life Shows Up" (featuring Mike Marshall and Cornel West)	4:21
Total length:		37:12

== Charts ==
Chart (2018)	Peak position
US Top Rap Albums (Billboard)	77
US Independent Albums (Billboard)	20
US Indie Store Album Sales (Billboard)	19
