= Federal (E-40 album) =

Studio album by E-40
- Released: 1992
- Studios: K-Lou - Richmond, CA; Mob Shop
- Genre: Hip-hop
- Length: 58:54
- Labels: Sick Wid It; Jive (reissue)
- Producer: Studio Ton

E-40 chronology
Mr. Flamboyant (1991)	Federal (1992)	The Mail Man (1993)

Federal is the first full-length album by American rapper E-40, following his 1991 EP Mr. Flamboyant. It was released in 1992 by Sick Wid It Records. It peaked at number 80 on the Billboard Top R&B/Hip-Hop Albums. Jive Records reissued Federal in 1995 with an alternate tracklist and tracks 7, 11 and 13 missing.

== Critical reception ==
Professional ratings
Review scores
Source	Rating
AllMusic	2.5/5 stars
The Encyclopedia of Popular Music	3/5 stars
(The New) Rolling Stone Album Guide	3.5/5 stars

Spin called Federal a "historic, self-released debut [that] invented a hustle, a sound, a new rap language."

== Track listing ==
- All tracks were produced by Studio Ton

No.	Title	Length
1.	"Drought Season" (featuring Kaveo)	4:22
2.	"Rat Heads"	5:36
3.	"Federal"	4:57
4.	"Outsmart the Po Po's" (featuring B-Legit)	4:25
5.	"Hide 'n' Seek"	4:25
6.	"Carlos Rossi"	4:47
7.	"Tanji II"	3:43
8.	"Let Him Have It" (featuring Little Bruce and Kaveo)	4:53
9.	"Questions" (featuring Lil E)	0:40
10.	"Extra Manish" (featuring Mugzi)	4:03
11.	"Get Em Up"	3:49
12.	"Nuttin Ass Nigga"	4:17
13.	"Rasta Funky Style"	4:29
14.	"Shots Out"	4:28

Samples

- "Extra Manish" contains a sample of "Left Me Lonely" by MC Shan.
- "Drought Season" contains a sample of "One Love" by Whodini.
- "Hide 'N Seek" contains a sample of "Flirt" by Cameo.
- "Rat Heads" contains a sample of "No Name Bar" by Isaac Hayes and "Short Dog's in the House" by Too Short.

== Charts ==
Chart (1993)	Peak position
US Top R&B/Hip-Hop Albums (Billboard)	80
