= Paper Chasin' =

Paper Chasin' (4eva Hustlin')

Studio album by Suga-T
- Released: February 27, 1996
- Recorded: 1995
- Genre: Hip hop
- Length: 49:13
- Labels: Sick Wid' It; Jive
- Producers: DJ Xtra Large; Elijah Baker; Kevin Gardner; Levitti; Redwine; Sean T; Studio Ton; T-Mor; Tone Capone

Suga-T chronology
| It's All Good (1993) | Paper Chasin' (4eva Hustlin') (1996) | Gettin' It (2000) |

Singles from Paper Chasin' (4eva Hustlin')
- 1. "Recognize" Released: 1996

Paper Chasin' (4eva Hustlin') is the second solo studio album by American rapper Suga-T. It was released on February 27, 1996 through Sick Wid' It/Jive Records. Production was handled by Elijah Baker, Sean T, Studio Ton, Tone Capone, DJ Xtra Large, Kevin Gardner, Levitti, Redwine and T-Mor, with Suga-T serving as executive producer. It features guest appearances from B-Legit, Mac Shawn, E-40, G-Note, T-Pup, Boo, Mike Marshall and The Conscious Daughters.

The album debuted at number 193 on the Billboard 200, number 28 on the Top R&B Albums and number 13 on the Heatseekers Albums in the United States. It spawned the only single "Recognize", while its song "Suga Daddy" was previously included in Don't Be a Menace to South Central While Drinking Your Juice in the Hood: The Soundtrack.

== Critical reception ==
Professional ratings
Review scores
| Source | Rating |
|---|---|
| AllMusic | 2.5/5 stars |

AllMusic – "...Paper Chasin', is an improvement over the somewhat unformed It's All Good. Paper Chasin' remains unfocused, but the multitude of hip-hop and R&B styles, as well as the bevy of guest stars, makes the record interesting. Suga T never manages to tie all of her loose ends together, but taken individually many of the songs are quite good".

== Track listing ==
| No. | Title | Writer(s) | Producer(s) | Length |
|---|---|---|---|---|
| 1. | "Recognize" | Tenina Stevens; Anthony Gilmour | Tone Capone | 4:34 |
| 2. | "If U Don't Want None" (featuring T-Pup) | T. Stevens; Kevin Gardner | Kevin Gardner; Redwine | 4:34 |
| 3. | "Hustlas and Tendas" (featuring B-Legit, Mac Shawn and G-Note) | T. Stevens; Lewis King | Levitti | 4:02 |
| 4. | "Fuckin' Around Wit' Suga" (featuring B-Legit) | T. Stevens; Brandt Jones; Sean Thompson | Sean T | 4:38 |
| 5. | "The Playas Changed" (featuring Mike Marshall) | T. Stevens; Michael Marshall; Gilmour | Tone Capone | 3:48 |
| 6. | "Wanna Get Freaky" | T. Stevens; Elijah Baker | Elijah Baker | 3:03 |
| 7. | "U Don't See Wanna See Me" (featuring E-40) | T. Stevens; Earl Stevens; Marvin Whitemon | Studio Ton | 4:50 |
| 8. | "Should I..." (featuring Boo) | T. Stevens; Whitemon | Studio Ton | 3:45 |
| 9. | "Did That" (featuring Mac Shawn) | T. Stevens; Baker | Elijah Baker | 3:57 |
| 10. | "Hustlin' 4 Life" (featuring The Conscious Daughters) | T. Stevens; Carla Green; Karryl Smith; Thompson | Sean T | 3:36 |
| 11. | "Suga Daddy" | T. Stevens; A. Morris | T-Mor | 3:17 |
| 12. | "What U Gone Do" | T. Stevens; K. Turner | D.J. Xtra Large | 4:35 |
| 13. | "Recognize" (Instrumental) | T. Stevens; Gilmour | Tone Capone | 0:34 |
| Total length: | | | | 49:13 |

== Charts ==
| Chart (1996) | Peak position |
|---|---|
| US Billboard 200 | 193 |
| US Top R&B Albums (Billboard) | 28 |
| US Heatseekers Albums (Billboard) | 13 |
