= D-Shot =

American rapper

- Born: Danell LaShawn Stevens; December 12, 1969 (age 56)
- Origin: Vallejo, California, U.S.
- Genre: Hip hop
- Occupation: Rapper
- Years active: 1990–present
- Labels: Jive; Sick Wid It; Shot

Danell LaShawn Stevens Sr. (born December 12, 1969), better known as D-Shot, is an American rapper from Vallejo, California. D-Shot got his start as a member of the rap group the Click, which also included his siblings E-40 and Suga-T, as well as their cousin B-Legit. After E-40 formed his record label Sick Wid It Records, the Click released their debut album, Down and Dirty, after which each member released solo projects. D-Shot's debut album, The Shot Calla, was released in 1993 through Sick Wid It Records. In 1995, D-Shot formed his own label, Shot Records, where he released his second album, Six Figures, in 1997.

== Discography ==
=== Studio albums ===
Title	Release	Peak chart positions		
Title	Release	US	US R&B	US Heat
The Shot Calla	1994	—	52	32
Six Figures	1997	81	21	—
Money-Sex & Thugs	2001	—	—	—
Callin All Shots	2006	—	—	—
Presidential	2009	—	—	—
Ghetto	2012	—	—	—

=== Collaboration albums ===
- Down and Dirty with the Click (1992)
- Game Related with the Click (1995)
- Money & Muscle with the Click (2001)

=== Compilation albums ===
- D-Shot Presents – Boss Ballin': The Best In The Business (1995)
- D-Shot Presents – Boss Ballin' 2: The Mob Bosses (1998)
- Obstacles Original Motion Picture Soundtrack (2000)
- D-Shot Presents – Boss Ballin' 3: Greatest Hits (2003)
- D-Shot Presents – Boss Players (Volume 1)(2003)
- D-Shot Presents – Bosses In The Booth (2004)
- D-Shot Presents – Boss Ballin' 4: The Next Line Of Hitters (2005)
- The Best Of D-Shot: Yesterday, Today, & Tomorrow (2009)

=== Other releases ===
- D-Shot Presents: DMS – Takin' Ends (1994)
- D-Shot Presents: A.M.W. – The Real Mobb (1995)

== Soundtrack appearances ==
Title	Release	Other artist(s)	Soundtrack album
"Hot Ones Echo Thru the Ghetto"	1995	The Click, Levitti	Tales from the Hood
"On the Grind"	1996	The Click, Mike Marshall	Original Gangstas
"Gotta Have Game"	1996	The Click	Phat Beach
"Why You Wanna Funk?"	1996	The Click, Spice 1, Marcus Gore	High School High
"Struggled & Strived"	1997	The Click, Levitti	Dangerous Ground
"(I'll Be Yo') Huckleberry"	1997	E-40, Levitti, The Saulter Twins	Booty Call
"Fuckin' They Nose"	1999	The Click	Charlie Hustle: The Blueprint of a Self-Made Millionaire
"Gangsterous"	1999	E-40, The Mossie	Charlie Hustle: The Blueprint of a Self-Made Millionaire
"Captain Save a Hoe"	2013	The Click	Grand Theft Auto V

=== Guest appearances ===
Title	Release	Other artist(s)	Album
"Ain't Hard 2 Find"	1996	2Pac, E-40, B-Legit, C-Bo, Richie Rich	All Eyez on Me
"Keep Pimpin'"	1996	E-40	Tha Hall of Game
"Who Do I Trust"	1997	The Mossie	Southwest Riders
"Personal"	1998	E-40, Suga-T, The Mossie, Levitti	The Element of Surprise
