= Down and Dirty (album) =

Studio album by The Click
- Released: May 7, 1992; November 5, 1995 (reissue)
- Recorded: 1991–1992
- Genre: West Coast hip hop
- Length: 76:17; 49:11 (reissue)
- Label: Sick Wid It; Jive (reissue)
- Producer: Mike Mosley, Studio Ton

The Click chronology
Let's Side (1991)	Down and Dirty (1992)	Game Related (1995)

Professional ratings
Review scores
Source	Rating
Allmusic	3.5/5 stars

Down and Dirty is the debut album by American rap group The Click, released in 1992 on Sick Wid It Records. It peaked at number 87 on the Billboard Top R&B/Hip-Hop Albums chart.

In 1994, Sick Wid' It released it on CD, but with two of the 16 tracks missing. Jive records reissued Down and Dirty in 1995 on CD, although with several tracks remixed or missing from the original version.

A music video was produced for the song, "Tired of Being Stepped On", featuring Levitti and includes a cameo appearance by C-Bo.

== Original version (1992) ==
Original Sick Wid It version, released in 1992 on LP, CD and cassette.

=== Track listing ===
1. "Lets Get Drunk" - 5:26
2. "On a Mission" - 4:21
3. "Ballers" (featuring Mugzi) - 1:09
4. "Street Life" (featuring Kaveo & Mugzi) - 5:04
5. "Mic Check" - 3:59
6. "Mr. Flamboyant" - 6:22
7. "Tramp Dogs" - 5:19
8. "Old School" (featuring Little Bruce) - 4:47
9. "The !!!! That Will Mess Up Your Brain" - 4:54
10. "She Was Only 16" - 4:50
11. "Tired of Being Stepped On" (featuring Levitti) - 5:07
12. "Sohabs" - 3:35
13. "Daily Routine" - 3:59
14. "Clicks Concert" - 0:33
15. "Porno Star" (featuring Kaveo) - 3:27
16. "Party in the V-Town" - 4:13
17. "You !!!! Up When You Slammed My Motha" - 4:24
18. "Lets Side" - 4:48

== Reissue (1995) ==
Reissued Jive version, released in 1995 on CD and cassette. Seven of the eighteen tracks from the original tape were omitted completely and five were remixed, leaving just six cuts, in their original form.

=== Track listing ===
1. "Let's Get Drunk" - 5:17
2. "On a Mission" - 4:06
3. "Life" - 4:56
4. "Mic Check" - 3:51
5. "Mr. Flamboyant" - 6:00
6. "Tramp Dogs" - 5:08
7. "Old School" (featuring Little Bruce) - 5:01
8. "The Shit That Will Fuck With Your Brain Boy" - 5:02
9. "She's Was Only 16" - 4:29
10. "Tired of Being Stepped On" (featuring Levitti) - 5:00
11. "Click's Concert" - 0:21

== Samples ==
Daily Routine

- "Use Me" by Bill Withers

== Chart history ==
Chart (1992)	Peak position
US Billboard Top R&B/Hip-Hop Albums	87
