= The Click (group) =

American hip hop group

- Also known as: M.V.P.
- Origin: Vallejo, California, U.S.
- Genre: West Coast hip-hop
- Years active: 1988–present
- Labels: Sick Wid It; Jive
- Past members: E-40; B-Legit; D-Shot; Suga-T

The Click is an American hip-hop group from Vallejo, California, consisting of siblings E-40 (Earl Stevens), D-Shot (Danell Stevens), and Suga-T (Tenina Stevens), along with their cousin B-Legit (Brandt Jones).

Before releasing their debut studio album, the group recorded under the name M.V.P. and released the 1988 EP "The Kings Men". Over the course of their career, The Click released three studio albums.

Although the members continued collaborating on various solo projects over the years, the group’s only official reunion effort came in 2018 with Connected and Respected, a joint album by E-40 and B-Legit that featured the full group on the track "Blame It".

== Discography ==
=== Studio albums ===
| Title | Album details | Peak chart positions | | | Certifications |
| Title | Album details | US | US R&B | US Rap | Certifications |
|---|---|---|---|---|---|
| Down and Dirty | Released: May 7, 1992; Label: Sick Wid It, Jive; Format: CD, LP, cassette, digital download | — | 87 | — | |
| Game Related | Released: November 7, 1995; Label: Sick Wid It, Jive; Format: CD, LP, cassette, digital download | 21 | 3 | — | RIAA: Gold |
| Money & Muscle | Released: September 25, 2001; Label: Sick Wid It, Jive; Format: CD, cassette, digital download | 99 | 23 | — | |

=== Compilation albums ===
| Title | Album details |
|---|---|
| The Best of The Click | Released: 2003; Label: BMG Special Products; Format: CD |

=== Extended plays ===
| Title | EP details |
|---|---|
| The Kings Men (as M.V.P.) | Released: 1988; Label: Rushforce; Format: LP |
| Let's Side | Released: 1990; Label: Sick Wid It; Format: LP, cassette |

=== Guest appearances ===
| Title | Year | Artist(s) | Album |
|---|---|---|---|
| "Captain Save a Hoe" | 1993 | E-40 (feat. The Click) | The Mail Man |
| "Hot Ones Echo Thru the Ghetto" | 1995 | The Click | Tales from the Hood (soundtrack) |
| "On the Grind" | 1996 | The Click | Original Gangstas (soundtrack) |
| "Gotta Have Game" | 1996 | The Click | Phat Beach (soundtrack) |
| "Why You Wanna Funk?" | 1996 | Spice 1, The Click and Marcus Gore | High School High (soundtrack) |
| "Struggled & Strived" | 1997 | The Click and Levitti | Dangerous Ground (soundtrack) |
| "Fuckin' They Nose" | 1999 | E-40 (feat. The Click) | Charlie Hustle: The Blueprint of a Self-Made Millionaire |
| "Blame It" | 2018 | E-40 and B-Legit (feat. The Click) | Connected and Respected |
