= Suga-T =

American rapper

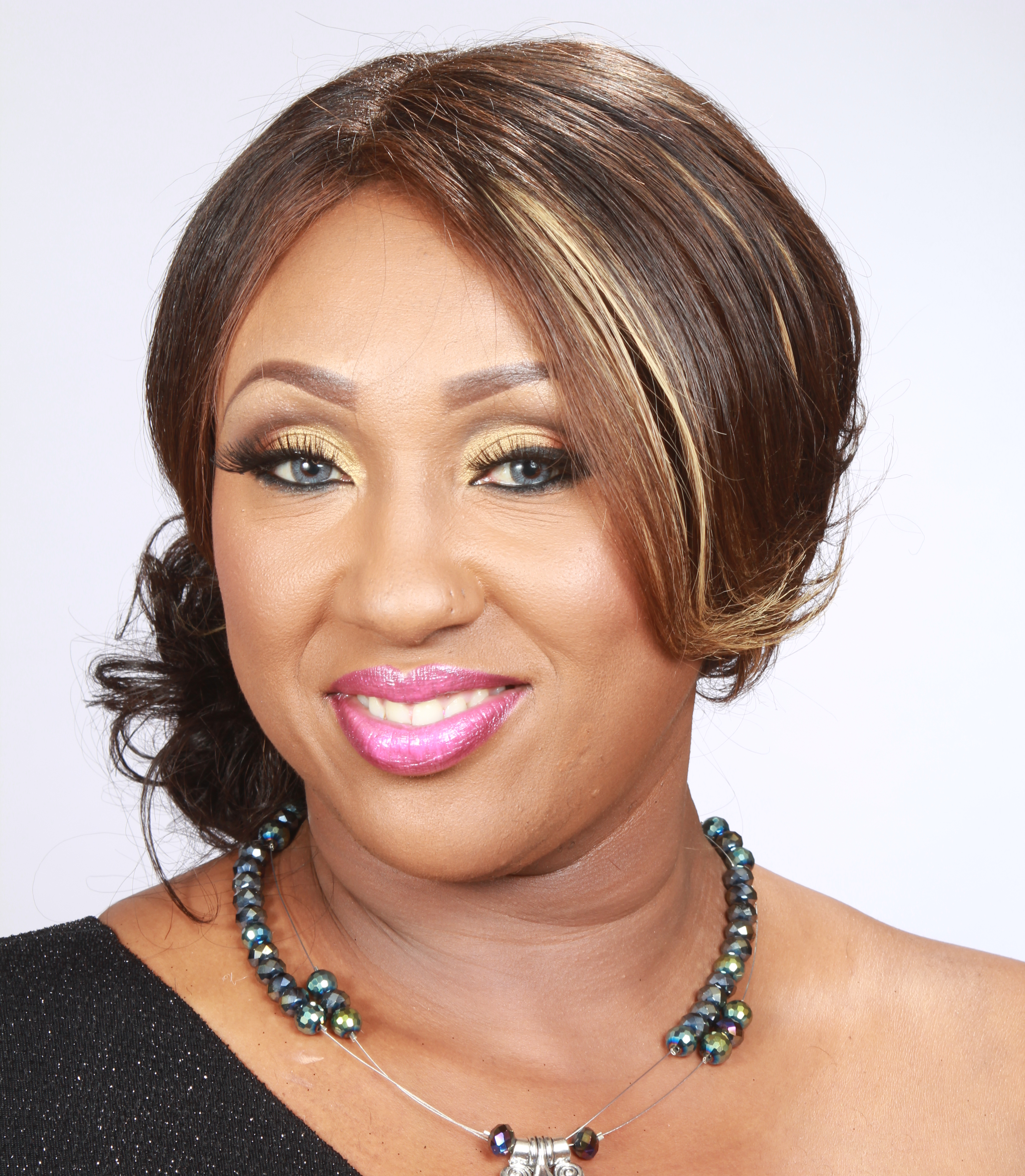
- Suga-T in 2011

Background information
- Born: Tenina Stevens; December 21, 1971 (age 54)
- Origin: Vallejo, California, U.S.
- Genres: Hip hop; gospel; R&B; EDM; pop
- Occupation: Rapper
- Years active: 1988–present
- Labels: Jive; Sick Wid It; Hip Hop Mom; Suga-T Music Publishing; Pushin Hits
- Member of: The Click

Tenina Stevens (born December 21, 1971), better known by her stage name Suga-T, is an American rapper from Vallejo, California. She is a founding member of the Click, a rap group that also includes her brothers E-40 and D-Shot and her cousin B-Legit.

The Click released their debut album, Down and Dirty, in 1992 through E-40's Sick Wid It Records, after which all four member released solo projects, with Suga-T's debut album It's All Good being released in 1993. In 1995 Sick Wid It signed a major label distribution deal with Jive Records, Suga-T then appeared on the Click's second album, Game Related in 1995 and released her major label debut Paper Chasin', which charted on the Billboard 200 at No. 193. She also sings multi-genres of music, writes songs and is a TV, music and executive producer. Suga-T is currently working as a performer, author, speaker, vision partner coach and is the founder of Sprinkle Me Enterprise and Sprinkle Me School of Music and Vision. At one time she sacrificed her career and went back to school to complete an AA Business, BA Psychology and MA in Organizational Management, re-invented her brand and helps others re-invent their brand.

== Discography ==
=== Studio albums ===
| Title | Release | Peak chart positions | |
| Title | Release | US | US R&B |
|---|---|---|---|
| It's All Good | Released: April 16, 1993; Label: Sick Wid It | — | 88 |
| Paper Chasin' | Released: February 27, 1996; Label: Sick Wid It, Jive | 193 | 28 |
| Be About It | Released: April 23, 2007; Label: Sprinkle Me Enterprise / Inspirationz By Suga, Inc | — | — |
| The Game Needs Me | Released: January 8, 2010; Label: Sprinkle Me Enterprise / Inspirationz By Suga, Inc | — | — |

=== Collaboration albums ===
- Down and Dirty with the Click (1992)
- Game Related with the Click (1995)
- Money & Muscle with the Click (2001)

=== Compilation albums ===
- Gettin' It (2000)

=== Mixtapes ===
- The Return of Suga-T: The Best Is Yet to Come (2010)

=== Extended plays ===
- The All Woman Show (2011)
- Queen of the West (2017)

== Soundtrack appearances ==
| Title | Release | Other artist(s) | Soundtrack |
|---|---|---|---|
| "Hot Ones Echo Thru the Ghetto" | 1995 | The Click, Levitti | Tales from the Hood |
| "Suga Daddy" | 1996 | | Don't Be a Menace to South Central While Drinking Your Juice in the Hood |
| "On the Grind" | 1996 | The Click, Mike Marshall | Original Gangstas |
| "Gotta Have Game" | 1996 | The Click | Phat Beach |
| "Why You Wanna Funk?" | 1996 | The Click, Spice 1 | High School High |
| "Struggled & Survived" | 1997 | The Click, Levitti | Dangerous Ground |
| "Fuckin' They Nose" | 1999 | The Click | Charlie Hustle: The Blueprint of a Self-Made Millionaire |
| "Ghetto Celebrity" | 1999 | E-40, Celly Cel | Charlie Hustle: The Blueprint of a Self-Made Millionaire |
| "If You Don't Want None" | 2000 | | Nurse Betty |
| "Who Owns It" | 2000 | | Live Nude Girls Unite |
| "Comin' Up on Somp'n" | 2001 | E-40 | Pootie Tang |
| "Captain Save a Hoe" | 2013 | The Click | Grand Theft Auto V |
