= Sharp On All 4 Corners: Corner 2 =

Studio album by E-40
- Released: December 9, 2014
- Recorded: 2013–2014
- Genre: Hip hop
- Length: 53:11
- Label: Heavy on the Grind
- Producer: Clinton Sands; Disko Boogie; Droop-E; Fastraks; Johnny Versace; Mike Free; Livin Proof; Rick Rock; Shonuff; Sam Bostic; Antonio Beats; Willy Will

E-40 chronology
| Sharp On All 4 Corners: Corner 1 (2014) | Sharp On All 4 Corners: Corner 2 (2014) | The D-Boy Diary: Book 1 (2016) |

Sharp On All 4 Corners: Corner 2 is the twenty-second studio album by American rapper E-40. The album was released on December 9, 2014, by Heavy on the Grind Entertainment. The album features guest appearances from B-Legit, Mack 10, Turf Talk, Dej Loaf, Ludacris, Kirko Bangz, Plies, Ty Dolla Sign and others.

Sharp On All 4 Corners: Corner 1 was also released on the same day.

== Reception ==
The album debuted at number 197 on Billboard 200, and No. 12 on the Top Rap Albums chart, selling 6,000 copies in its first week. It has sold 35,000 copies as of November 2016.

== Track listing ==
| No. | Title | Producer(s) | Length |
|---|---|---|---|
| 1. | "It's the First" (featuring Cousin Fik & Turf Talk) | Mike Free | 3:32 |
| 2. | "That's Right" (featuring Ty Dolla Sign) | Mike Free | 2:56 |
| 3. | "Bass Rocks" | Livin Proof | 3:21 |
| 4. | "Sellin' Dope Ain't Fun" (featuring Mack 10) | Rick Rock | 4:31 |
| 5. | "Real Nigga" (featuring Kirko Bangz) | Willy Will | 4:06 |
| 6. | "Quit Hatin'" | Rick Rock | 3:50 |
| 7. | "Heavy In the Game" (featuring B-Legit) | Johnny Versace | 3:53 |
| 8. | "Bout' To Pour Up" | Droop-E | 3:30 |
| 9. | "Baddest In the Building" (featuring Dej Loaf & Luigi The Singer) | Disko Boogie | 3:19 |
| 10. | "Sleep" (featuring Ludacris & Plies) | Shonuff | 4:36 |
| 11. | "Real Game For a Player" | Sam Bostic | 3:51 |
| 12. | "Jumpin' Like Mine" (featuring Cousin Fik & Work Dirty) | Antonio Beats; Droop-E | 3:45 |
| 13. | "Street Sense" (featuring Cousin Fik & Choose Up Cheese) | Fastraks | 3:43 |
| 14. | "Give Me Love" | Clinton Sands | 4:09 |

== Charts ==
| Chart (2014) | Peak position |
|---|---|
| US Billboard 200 | 197 |
| US Top R&B/Hip-Hop Albums (Billboard) | 19 |
| US Top Rap Albums (Billboard) | 12 |
| US Independent Albums (Billboard) | 13 |
