= E-A-Ski =

American rapper

- Born: Shon Adams; September 17, 1971 (age 54)
- Origin: Oakland, California, U.S.
- Genres: West Coast hip hop; hyphy
- Occupations: Record producer; rapper
- Years active: 1990–present
- Labels: IMGMI (current); E&C; No Limit; In-A-Minute; Priority; Infared Music; Relativity; DreamWorks; Columbia (former)
- Website: http://www.e-a-ski.com/

Shon Adams, better known by his stage name E-A-Ski, is an American rapper and producer from Oakland, California. He served as both a rapper and producer for No Limit Records, producing on Master P's early records and also releasing some of his own material.

== Music career ==
=== 1990-95: No Limit, 1 Step Ahead Of Yall and Blast If I Have To ===
In the early 1990s E-A-Ski signed to fellow rapper Master P's label No Limit Records when he was based in Richmond, California. As a solo artist in 1992 with his collaborator DJ CMT he released his debut EP 1 Step Ahead of Yall. By the mid-1990s E-A-Ski had left No Limit Records and signed to Priority Records. He released a second EP in 1995 also entitled Blast If I Have To, his first single from the album entitled "Blast If I Have To" it would also be a single from the Friday: Music from the Motion Picture.

=== 1997-98: Earthquake ===
In 1997 after disbanding from Priority Records E-A-Ski signed to Relativity Records. In 1997 E-A-Ski released his first single from his upcoming debut album Earthquake entitled "Showdown"; it featured singer Montell Jordan. In 1998 after negotiating with DreamWorks Records to buy him out his contract from Relativity Records to promote Earthquake more quickly and aggressively than Relativity would or could, E-A-Ski and his label IMG agreed to sign to DreamWorks. Also in 1998 E-A-Ski released the second single from the album Earthquake entitled "25 With A Mill Ticket". But on December 7, 1998, E-A-Ski would sue DreamWorks for $30 million due to them at the time not wanting to release Earthquake; the album would later be shelved.

=== 1996-2010: The Resume ===
In 1996 E-A-Ski signed to Columbia Records and started working on a new album entitled Apply Pressure. In 2002 E-A-Ski released two singles from Apply Pressure entitled "Manuscript" and "Gangsta Funk". But, due to BMG buying into a percentage of Columbia Records, it stopped the release process of the album In 2003 E-A-Ski disbanded from Columbia Records and go completely independent with his label IMG, in that same year E-A-Ski released a single from Apply Pressure entitled "Can't Get Enough" featuring artists San Quinn and Allen Anthony. In 2004 E-A-Ski released a single from Apply Pressure entitled "Ride". In 2005 E-A-Ski released a single from Apply Pressure entitled "MyBad".

On September 7, 2010, E-A-Ski released his debut album entitled The Resume via his label IMG, it was his first album released in 15 years.

=== 2010-present: The Fifth Of Skithoven ===
On October 31, 2010, during an interview E-A-Ski announced that he was working on a new album entitled The Fifth Of Skithoven.

On April 3, 2012, E-A-Ski released a single entitled "Off The Radar" featuring artists King T and Young Maylay. On September 24, 2012, E-A-Ski released a single entitled "Cruise Control". On July 9, 2013, E-A-Ski released a single entitled "That Ain't No Heat" featuring hip hop icon Messy Marv. On September 10, 2013, E-A-Ski released a single entitled "Ratchet Music".

On December 15, 2014, E-A-Ski released a single entitled "They Know".

On July 10, 2015, E-A-Ski released a single entitled "Wake Em Up" featuring artists Tech N9ne and Too $hort.

== Record production ==
In 1992–1993 he produced several tracks on Spice 1's albums Spice 1 and 187 He Wrote . 187 He Wrote peaked at number 1 on the Billboard Top R&B/Hip-Hop Albums and at number 10 on the Billboard 200 in 1993. Continuing to solidify the strength of his production work with Spice-1, the E-A-Ski produced Trigga Gots No Heart which also featured in the Menace II Society film, as well being released as a single (with video) for promotion for the now classic Hughes Brothers film. The Menace II Society soundtrack is a platinum-certified album.

In 1995, E-A-Ski scored yet again with his production on "Playa Hater" off the Luniz Operation Stackola album. Certified Platinum by the RIAA, Operation Stackola served as the Luniz highest-selling album to date, peaking at number 1 on the Billboard Top R&B/Hip-Hop Albums and at Number 20 on the Billboard 200 in 1995. In addition, the E-A-Ski produced song "Playa Hata" sparked the now infamous, and since resolved, beef between the Luniz and Too Short, which prompted Too Short to record several response records on his 10th album Gettin' It.

== Discography ==
=== Studio albums ===
List of studio albums, with selected chart positions
Title	Album details	Peak chart positions	
Title	Album details	US	US R&B
The Resume	Released: September 7, 2010; Label: IMGMI; Format: CD, MD, LP	—	—
The Fifth Of Skithoven	Release date: TBA, 2016; Label: IMGMI; Formats: CD, MD, LP	TBR	

=== Extended plays ===
List of EP's, with selected chart positions
Title	Album details	Peak chart positions	
Title	Album details	US	US R&B
High Stepping	Released: 1990; Label: E&C; Format: Cassette, EP	—	—
Breaking Them Off Something (with CMT as SKI $ CMT)	Released: 1992; Label: No Limit, In-A-Minute; Format: Cassette, EP	—	—
1 Step Ahead of Yall	Released: 1992; Label: No Limit, In-A-Minute; Format: CD, Cassette, MD, EP	—	—
Blast If I Have To	Released: 1995; Label: Priority; Format: CD, Cassette, MD, EP	—	—
Please	Released: August 23, 2011; Label: IMGMI; Format: MD, EP	—	—
Artist/Producer	Released: TBA, 2016; Label: IMGMI; Format: CD, Cassette, MD, EP	TBR	

=== Soundtrack albums ===
List of soundtrack albums, with selected chart positions and certifications
Title	Album details	Peak chart positions		Certifications
Title	Album details	US	US R&B	Certifications
Friday (with Various artists)	Released: April 11, 1995; Label: Priority, EMI; Formats: CD, MD, LP	1	1	RIAA: 2× Platinum

=== Compilation albums ===
List of compilation albums, with selected chart positions and certifications
Title	Album details	Peak chart positions	
Title	Album details	US	US R&B
West Coast Bad Boyz II (with Various artist as West Coast Bad Boyz)	Released: January 10, 1997; Label: No Limit, Priority; Formats: CD, MD, LP	17	6

=== Miscellaneous ===
List of miscellaneous albums, with selected information
Title	Album details	Notes
Earthquake	Recorded: 1997–1998; Released: March 19, 2009 (US) (Shelved); Label: IMG, DreamWorks; Format: Bootleg, digital download	Originally meant to be released as E-A-Ski's debut studio album. However, due to DreamWorks at the time not wanting to release the album, E-A-Ski filed a $30 million lawsuit against DreamWorks. Earthquake was recorded while E-A-Ski was signed to Relativity Records. On March 19, 2009, the album was leaked.

=== Singles ===
==== As lead artist ====
List of singles as lead artist, with selected chart positions and certifications, showing year released and album name
Title	Year	Peak chart positions			Album
Title	Year	US	US R&B	US Rap	Album
"Straight Business"	1992	—	—	—	1 Step Ahead of Yall
"Blast If I Have To"	1995	—	—	—	Blast If I Have To and Friday: Music from the Motion Picture
"Showdown" (featuring Montell Jordan)	1997	—	—	—	Earthquake (Shelved)
"25 With A Mill Ticket"	1998	—	—	—	Earthquake (Shelved)
"Manuscript"	2002	—	—	—	The Resume
"Gangsta Funk"	2002	—	—	—	The Resume
"Can't Get Enough" (featuring San Quinn and Allen Anthony)	2003	—	—	—	The Resume
"Ride"	2004	—	—	—	The Resume
"MyBad"	2005	—	—	—	The Resume
"Off The Radar" (featuring King T and Young Maylay)	2012	—	—	—	—N/a
"Cruise Control"	2012	—	—	—	—N/a
"That Ain't No Heat" (featuring Messy Marv)	2013	—	—	—	—N/a
"Ratchet Music"	2013	—	—	—	—N/a
"They Know"	2014	—	—	—	—N/a
"Wake Em Up" (featuring Tech N9ne and Too $hort)	2015	—	—	—	The Fifth Of Skithoven

==== As featured artist ====
List of singles as featured artist, with selected chart positions and certifications, showing year released and album name
Title	Year	Peak chart positions			Album
Title	Year	US	US R&B	US Rap	Album
"Trust Nobody" (Master P featuring E-A-Ski)	1992	—	—	—	Mama's Bad Boy

== E-A-Ski and CMT production discography ==
=== 1992 ===
- Spice 1 – Spice 1
  - 03. "East Bay Gangster (Reggae)"
  - 07. "Young Nigga"
  - 14. "187 Pure"
- TRU – Understanding the Criminal Mind
  - 01. "Niggas From Calli"
  - 04. "Little Slut"
  - 08. "Im The Funkest"
  - 09. "I Wear A Bullet Proof Vest"
  - 10. "Understanding The Criminal Mind"
  - 11. "1-900-Crime"

=== 1993 ===
- Spice 1 – 187 He Wrote
  - 02. "Dumpin' Em in Ditches"
  - 11. "Runnin' Out Da Crackhouse"
  - 12. "Trigga Gots No Heart"
  - 14. "RIP"

=== 1995 ===
- Kam – Made in America
  - 03. "Pull Ya Hoe Card"
  - 10. "Who Ridin"
- Luniz – Operation Stackola
  - 06. "Playa Hata" (feat. Teddy)
- Master P – 99 Ways to Die
  - 05. "Bullets Gots No Name" (feat. E-A-Ski and Rally Ral)

=== 1996 ===
- Ice-T – VI – Return of the Real
  - 02. "Where The Shit Goes Down" (feat. E-A-Ski)
- Mr. Mike – Wicked Wayz
  - 01. "Intro"
  - 02. "Southwest" (feat. E-A-Ski)
  - 03. "G's Perspective"
  - 04. "Where Ya Love At"
  - 10. "Da Boogie Man"
  - 12. "Game Affiliation"

=== 1997 ===
- Crime Boss – Conflicts & Confusion
  - 02. "Conflicts & Confusion"
  - 03. "No Friends"
  - 06. "Back To The Streets"
  - 08. "What Does It Mean (To Be A Real Crime Boss)"
  - 09. "Close Range"
  - 10. "Please Stop"
  - 13. "Get Mine"

=== 1998 ===
- Ka'Nut – Look At Em Now
  - 03. "Reach Out And Touch Ya"
  - 05. "Aint Tha Nigga"
  - 06. "G-Slide"
  - 11. "Cant Catch Me"
  - 13. "How We Lay It Down"
- Ice Cube – War & Peace Vol. 1 (The War Disc)
  - 18. "Penitentiary"
- Jayo Felony – Whatcha Gonna Do?
  - 07. "Nitty Gritty"
  - 08. "Im Deadly"
  - 14. "Finna Shit On Em" (feat. Mack 10)
  - 15. "Hustle In My Genes"

=== 2000 ===
- Dual Committee – Dual Committee
  - 02. "Your Friends"
  - 03. "Cant Stop It"
- DenGee – DenGee Livin'
  - 02. "Break Bread" (feat. E-A-Ski)
  - 03. "Den & Gee"
  - 04. "Over Some Dope"
  - 06. "Lucy Turf Walker" (feat. Mr. Town)
  - 07. "Da Hustle" (feat. Silk-E Da People’s Champ)
  - 08. "Broken Glass" (feat. San Quinn and T-Pup)
  - 10. "Wig Split" (feat. Spice 1)
  - 11. "VIP Status"
  - 12. "Can't Wait" (feat. Silk-E. Da People’s Champ, No The Piper and T-Pup)
  - 13. "Characters"
  - 14. "What Do You Want"
  - 15. "Palms, Elbows & Back Arms"

=== 2002 ===
- B-Legit – Hard 2 B-Legit
  - 05. "1 Dame" (feat. Harm)
- Yukmouth – United Ghettos of America
  - 06. "Da Lot"
  - 10. "Fuck Friendz"

=== 2004 ===
- Thug Lordz – In Thugz We Trust
  - 07. "Killa Cali" (feat. Spice 1)
  - 13. "21 Gun Salute"

=== 2005 ===
- Mistah F.A.B. – Son of a Pimp
  - 15. "N.E.W. Oakland" (feat. Bavgate and G-Stack)

=== 2006 ===
- San Quinn – The Rock: Pressure Makes Diamonds
  - 02. "Hell Yeah!" (feat. E-A-Ski and Allen Anthony)
- Dem Hoodstarz – Band-Aid & Scoot
  - 04. "How We Do" (feat. E-40 and Michael Marshall)
- Messy Marv – Draped Up & Chipped Out
  - 10. "Millionaire Gangstas"
- Messy Marv – Gettin That Guac
  - 04. "Here I" (feat. Selau)
- Bullys wit Fullys – The Infrastructure
  - 05. "So Hood" (feat. Clyde Carson)

=== 2007 ===
- The Frontline – Lock & Left
  - 00. All tracks except track 3
- B-Legit – Throwblock Muzic
  - 14. "Where Is This Going" (feat. Levitti)
- Too Short – I Love The Bay
  - 18. "Richmond"
- Turf Talk – West Coast Vaccine: The Cure
  - 05. "Super Star" (feat. Locksmith)

=== 2010 ===
- Locksmith – Frank the Rabbit
  - 00. All tracks

=== 2014 ===
- MC Ren – Rebel Music (EP)
  - 00. All tracks

=== 2018 ===
- Ice Cube – Everythang's Corrupt
  - "Still In The Kitchen"
  - "Pocket Full of Evil"

== See also ==
- No Limit Records
