= West Coast Vaccine: The Cure =

Studio album by Turf Talk
- Released: June 5, 2007
- Genre: Hip hop
- Label: Sick Wid It, SMC
- Producer: Rick Rock; Droop E E-A-Ski; CMT; Tha Bizness; Rome; Jake One; Troy Sanders; LA; Traxamillion

Turf Talk chronology
Turf Talk Brings The Hood Colabilation (2005)	West Coast Vaccine: The Cure (2007)

Professional ratings
Review scores
Source	Rating
Okayplayer	4.5/5 stars

The West Coast Vaccine is the second studio album by Vallejo, California rapper Turf Talk. With his older cousin E-40 signed to Lil Jon's BME imprint, it was believed that Jon would produce Turf's second record but when the track list was released, it was apparent that would not be so. The album does however feature production by Bay Area producers Rick Rock, E-A-Ski and Traxamillion. New York Times music critic Kelefa Sanneh said Turf Talk's 2007 effort was "arguably the year’s most exciting hip-hop album" though it had "pretty much remained a secret."

== Track listing ==
1. Intro (feat. Akronems of Writers Block) (produced by Nick Fury)
2. Bring The Base Back (produced by Rick Rock)
3. Doe Boy (feat. E-40 & B-Legit) (produced by Droop-E)
4. Record Company (Skit)
5. Super Star (feat. Locksmith Of The Frontline) (produced by E-A-Ski & CMT)
6. I Got Chips (feat. E-40) (produced by Rick Rock)
7. That’s That Turf Talk (produced by Tha Bizness)
8. Broke Niggas! (produced by Droop-E)
9. Popo's (feat. E-40 & Mike Marshall) (produced by Droop-E)
10. Back In The Day (feat. Cartoon "Ruff Rider West" & Jelly Roll) (produced By Rome)
11. Money On Ya' Head (feat. KnockaMichie) (produced by Rick Rock)
12. Holla At You (feat. Rick Rock) (produced by Rick Rock)
13. Sick Wid' It Is the Crew (feat. E-40) (produced by Jake One)
14. X (Feat. Yukmouth) (produced by Rick Rock)
15. Liquor Store (Skit)
16. I’m Ghetto (produced by Rick Rock)
17. Stop Snitchin' (feat. E-40) (produced by Droop-E)
18. Minnie Minnie (feat. Freeway) (produced by Droop E)
19. Rippah (feat. Too Short) (produced by Troy Sanders)
20. Shinnin' (produced by LA)
21. Groupie (produced by Traxamillion)
