= The Block Brochure: Welcome to the Soil 5 =

Studio album by E-40
- Released: December 10, 2013
- Recorded: 2012–2013
- Genre: Hip hop
- Length: 56:56
- Label: Heavy on the Grind
- Producer: AJ; C. Ballin; DecadeZ; Disko Boogie; Droop-E; J. Wells; Mr. Lee; RAWSMOOV; Rednose; ReeceBeats; Scorp Dezel; Willy Will

E-40 chronology
The Block Brochure: Welcome to the Soil 4 (2013)	The Block Brochure: Welcome to the Soil 5 (2013)	The Block Brochure: Welcome to the Soil 6 (2013)

Singles from The Block Brochure: Welcome to the Soil 5
- 1. "All My Niggaz" Released: August 20, 2013

The Block Brochure: Welcome to the Soil 5 is the nineteenth studio album by American rapper E-40. The album was released on December 10, 2013, by Heavy on the Grind Entertainment. The album features guest appearances from 2 Chainz, Young Bari, Roach Gigz, Iamsu!, Kool John, Gucci Mane, Young Scooter, Z-Ro, Big K.R.I.T., Danny Brown, Schoolboy Q, B-Legit, Mike Marshall, Too Short, Work Dirty, Laroo T.H.H., Stressmatic and J. Banks.

== Background ==
On October 1, 2012, E-40 announced he would be releasing The Block Brochure: Welcome to the Soil 4, 5 and 6 on March 26, 2013. On June 12, 2013, the album covers were revealed for The Block Brochure: Welcome to the Soil 4, 5 and 6. In June 2013, E-40 explained why he was releasing three albums in one day, saying:

I'm a score and a nickel deep in the game! That's 25 years with real studio albums on the shelf. If an artist can release two and three mixtapes a year for free, I can release two or three official studio albums a year for money. As an independent artist I do what I want, not what I can. I'm putting out three albums because I've got 3 decades of fans that I gotta satisfy. I've been through hella different eras of music and I survived successfully! It took William Shakespeare 20 years of experience to write Hamlet! I make slaps and paint pictures with my raps and I'm in my prime with 25 years of experience. You ain't gotta like me but you gotta respect me!

In a December 2013, interview with HipHopDX, E-40 spoke about the direction he went on the album, saying: "I just wanna keep it right in the pocket of what they been listening to with a new school twist, but keep the old school twist too. You feel me? So I want to make sure it's the right recipe. The right... When you dip your finger in that sauce, the seasoning is perfect." In the same interview he spoke about how he decided who he would collaborate with on the album, saying: "You know, a lot of times, we get the beats early. The beat is always first. Us as artists, we like, 'This the perfect beat. Do you know who would sound good on here? Big K.R.I.T. and Z-Ro.' And I rock with 'em. I got love for 'em, so let's see if they can get on this with me, and that's how it all unfolds."

In a December 2013, interview with XXL, E-40 spoke about the process of recording three albums, saying: "I'm not going to lie, this one was tough to do. To come back with 4, 5 and 6, three albums, it comes to a point where I can do one album standing on my head, easy. I'd probably have it done within three weeks or a month the way I work. The Block Brochure 4, 5 and 6, it was a trip because I did over a hundred songs and I shaved it all the way down to 42 songs. But I shaved it down because I wanted every song to poke out like nipples. And that's what it's doing. Just throw it in and just ride, just have a good time."

He went on to discuss how long it took to record, saying: "You know, guest appearances help a lot. When you do a song with other artists—'cause everybody wants to hear another artist with their favorite artist—one thing you got make sure is when you take that first verse and that second verse, you got to be a part of the whole song. Whether you on the hook on there talking or repeating the ad-libs, that's one thing I learned to do over the years. Now just imagine, from March 2010 I dropped Revenue Retrievin': Day Shift and Night Shift. Here it is, December 2013. Within that amount of time—just to show you my work progress—within that amount of time I dropped 10 solos and two duos, with me and Too $hort. So that's 12 albums [from] March 2010 to now when The Block Brochure 4, 5, and 6 comes out. That's three and a half years."

He also spoke about the deadline for the release date, saying: "You know what's the trip about it? At the end, I was trying to reach deadline, [and] then I said fuck that, we coming out December 10. Then I finally got stressed out after things was done. Ain't that a trip? ... I got my album done and all the covers. Everything is in promotions. But I guess it just caught up with me. But I'm back."

He also spoke about some of the features on the album, saying:

I try to do collaborations that a lot of people don't do. When it's already predictable it's not so much of a special song. I got a song with me, Big K.R.I.T. and Z-Ro ["In Dat Cup"]; me, T.I., and Chris Brown ["Episode"]. I never did a song with T.I., I always had love for him. We both had mutual respect for each other but never did one. Never did a song with Chris Brown singing. We did a rap song remix with him with "Function" [and] he killed it, that's a great song too. My son Droop-E and Work Dirty, first of all they [on] Sick Wid' It Records—my label—and they also family and always in the studio with me. Decades produced the beat, he family too. That was just one of those moments where it's, "Let's come with it." My boy Stressmatic came with the hook, "Yellow Gold". Soon as he did the hook we was on the case. But that's what it's about, doing songs with people like me, Danny Brown and ScHoolboy Q ["All My Niggas"]. Three unique different styles, unorthodox, different voices, doing what everybody else don't.

== Singles ==
On August 15, 2013, the music video was released for "All My Niggaz" featuring Danny Brown and Schoolboy Q. On August 20, 2013, the album's first single "All My Niggaz" featuring Danny Brown and Schoolboy Q was released. On August 26, 2013, the music video was released for "Off the Block" featuring Stressmatic and J. Banks. On December 10, 2013, the music video was released for "Plush" featuring Cousin Fik. On June 13, 2014, the music video was released for "I Be On My Shit".

== Critical reception ==
Professional ratings
Review scores
Source	Rating
AllMusic	3.5/5 stars
HipHopDX	3/5 stars

The Block Brochure: Welcome to the Soil 5 received generally positive reviews from music critics. Ronald Grant of HipHopDX gave the album three out of five stars, saying "All in all, E-40 has built an entire career out of Hip Hop that’s relatable, yet adventurous, playful and entertainingly repetitious. The Block Brochure: Welcome To The Soil Parts 4, 5, & 6 continues in that tradition. While it’s a lot to ask of today’s stunted attention spans and isn’t without lapses, The Block Brochure proves that E-40 is still more ahead of the curve at crafting imaginative Hip Hop music than many new artists can ever hope to be." David Jeffries of AllMusic gave the album three and a half stars out of five, saying "The dark and nasty Pt. 5 has its strong and unique points, pulling the listener in with three solid examples of E-40 slinging slang and schooling fools on his lonesome. Blingy hedonist 2 Chainz then pumps the disc up with "Countdown," while later there's Gucci Mane being wonderfully strange ("Project Building"), Z-Ro with Big K.R.I.T. pleasing the gangsters with a trunk-rumbling cut ("In Dat Cup"), and both B-Legit ("A Breath of Fresh Air") and Too $hort ("When You Gone Let Me") convincing E-40 that throwback is the way to go. Still, it's Danny Brown and ScHoolboy Q who win Pt. 5's prize with the twitchy and thoroughly modern monster dubbed "All of My N*ggaz"."

== Track listing ==
No.	Title	Producer(s)	Length
1.	"I'm Pushin'"	Droop-E	3:37
2.	"Plush"	AJ	4:35
3.	"Mister T"	RAWSMOOV	4:19
4.	"Countdown" (featuring 2 Chainz)	C-Ballin	3:21
5.	"I Be On My Shit"	Disko Boogie	4:01
6.	"Play Too Much" (featuring Young Bari & Roach Gigz)	ReeceBeats	4:01
7.	"All Y'all" (featuring Iamsu! & Kool John)	Willy Will	4:49
8.	"Project Building" (featuring Gucci Mane & Young Scooter)	Droop-E	4:39
9.	"In Dat Cup" (featuring Z-Ro & Big K.R.I.T.)	Mr. Lee	4:04
10.	"Homeless Criminals (skit)"	Rednose	0:40
11.	"All My Niggaz" (featuring Danny Brown & Schoolboy Q)	DecadeZ	3:16
12.	"A Breath of Fresh Air" (featuring B-Legit & Mike Marshall)	Scorp Dezel	3:51
13.	"When You Gone Let Me" (featuring Too Short)	Scorp Dezel	3:23
14.	"Do What I Gotta Do" (featuring Work Dirty & Laroo T.H.H.)	J. Wells	3:58
15.	"Off the Block" (featuring Stressmatic & J. Banks)	DecadeZ	4:21

== Charts ==
Chart (2013)	Peak position
US Billboard 200	140
US Top R&B/Hip-Hop Albums (Billboard)	20
