= Breakin' News =

Breakin News

Studio album by E-40
- Released: September 9, 2003
- Recorded: 2002–2003
- Studios: The Orange Room; The Cosmic Slop Shop (Sacramento, CA); The Archives; Hard Knock Studios; Right Track Studios (New York, NY); Bosko's Chicken and Beats Studios (Los Angeles, CA); The Pharmacy Recording
- Genre: Hip hop
- Length: 75:25
- Labels: Sick Wid It; Jive
- Producers: Big Smash; Bosko; Caviar; CMT; Droop-E; E-A-Ski; Lil Jon; Mo Mo; Nick Fury; Overdose; Rick Rock; Sam Bostic

E-40 chronology
Grit & Grind (2002)	Breakin News (2003)	My Ghetto Report Card (2006)

Singles from Breakin News
- 1. "One Night Stand" Released: 2003; 2. "Quarterbackin'" Released: 2003; 3. "Act a Ass" Released: 2003

Professional ratings
Review scores
Source	Rating
AllMusic	3/5 stars
RapReviews	7.5/10

Breakin News is the eighth studio album by American rapper E-40. It was released on September 9, 2003, by Sick Wid It Records and Jive Records.

== Background ==
Recording sessions took place at The Orange Room, The Cosmic Slop Shop in Sacramento, The Archives, Hard Knock Studios, Right Track Studios in New York City, Bosko's Chicken and Beats Studios in Los Angeles, and The Pharmacy Recording. Production was handled by Rick Rock, Big Smash, Bosko, Caviar, CMT, Droop-E, E-A-Ski, Lil' Jon, Mo Mo, Nick Fury, Overdose and Sam Bostic, with E-40 serving as executive producer. It features guest appearances from The Mossie, Mo Mo, Turf Talk, Doonie Baby, Rankin' Scroo, the Clipse, B-Legit, Bonecrusher, David Banner, DJ Kay Slay, Don Parma, E-A-Ski, Goapele, James "Stomp Down" Bailey, Keak da Sneak, Lil' Jon & the East Side Boyz, Messy Marv, Passion, San Quinn and Stressmatic.

The album peaked at number 16 on the Billboard 200 and number 4 on the Top R&B/Hip-Hop Albums in the United States. SoundScan reported that the album sold 50,000 copies in its first week on shelves. It spawned three singles: "One Night Stand", "Quarterbackin'" and "Act a Ass". The latter appeared in F. Gary Gray's 2005 film Be Cool.

== Track listing ==
No.	Title	Writer(s)	Producer(s)	Length
1.	"Breakin' News" (featuring Rankin' Scroo)	Earl Stevens; Harold Johnson; Ricardo Thomas	Rick Rock	4:53
2.	"Hot" (featuring Mo Mo)	E. Stevens; E. Olivier; Thomas	Rick Rock	3:08
3.	"I Got Dat Work" (featuring Turf Talk)	E. Stevens; Demar Bernstein; Thomas	Rick Rock	4:51
4.	"Quarterbackin'" (featuring the Clipse)	E. Stevens; Gene Thornton; Terrence Thornton; Shon Adams	E-A-Ski; CMT	4:44
5.	"Married to the Ave" (featuring Young Mugzi)	E. Stevens; Dulon Stevens; Thomas	Rick Rock	4:25
6.	"One Night Stand" (featuring DJ Kay Slay, Stressmatic and Doonie Baby)	E. Stevens; Thomas Jackson; Thomas	Rick Rock	4:12
7.	"I Hope U Get This Kite"	E. Stevens; Kannon Cross; William Moore; Maurice White; Philip Bailey; Charles Stepney	Caviar; Overdose	4:05
8.	"Act a Ass" (featuring Rankin' Scroo, Kaveo and Young Mugzi)	E. Stevens; Johnson; Kevin Davis; D. Stevens; Thomas	Rick Rock	4:28
9.	"Anybody Can Get It" (featuring Lil' Jon & The East Side Boyz, Bone Crusher and David Banner)	E. Stevens; Jonathan Smith; Wayne Hardnett; Lavell Crump	Lil' Jon	4:23
10.	"Gasoline" (featuring Turf Talk and Doonie Baby)	E. Stevens; Bernstein; Andrew Seidel; Thomas	Rick Rock	4:35
11.	"Show & Prove" (featuring Goapele)	E. Stevens; Goapele Mohlabane; Sam Bostic	Sam Bostic	3:41
12.	"This Goes Out" (featuring Turf Talk)	E. Stevens; Bernstein; A. Payne	Big Smash	3:57
13.	"Northern Califoolya" (featuring San Quinn, Messy Marv, B-Legit, E-A-Ski, Keak Da Sneak and Stomp Down)	E. Stevens; Quincy Brooks; Marvin Watson; Brandt Jones; Adams; Charles Bowens; James Bailey; Thomas	Rick Rock	5:10
14.	"That's a Good Look 4 U" (featuring Passion and Don Parma)	E. Stevens; Passion Broussard; Clarence Hutchinson; Nicholaus Loftin	Nick Fury	4:25
15.	"If I Was a 5th" (featuring Mo Mo)	E. Stevens; Olivier; Bosko Kante	Bosko	4:17
16.	"Wa La" (featuring The Mossie and Mo Mo)	E. Stevens; D. Stevens; Davis; Olivier	Mo Mo	3:54
17.	"Pharmaceutical Outro"	E. Stevens; Earl Stevens, Jr.	Droop-E	2:23
18.	"Quarterbackin' (DJ Quik Remix)" (featuring the Clipse)			4:04
Total length:				1:15:22

Sample credits

- Track 7 contains a sample of "Imagination" by Earth, Wind & Fire.

== Charts ==
Chart (2003)	Peak position
US Billboard 200	16
US Top R&B/Hip-Hop Albums (Billboard)	4
