= History: Mob Music =

Studio album by E-40 and Too Short
- Released: November 6, 2012
- Recorded: 2010–2012
- Genre: Hip-hop
- Length: 60:08
- Label: Heavy on the Grind; EMI
- Producer: Droop-E; Sam Bostic; ShonuFF; Rick Rock; DJ Battlecat; Demolishbeatz; Benjamin Blapperson; Studio Tone; Caviar; OZ; J. Wells; J2

E-40 chronology
History: Function Music (2012)	History: Mob Music (2012)	The Block Brochure: Welcome to the Soil 4 (2013)

Too Short chronology
No Trespassing (2012)	History: Mob Music (2012)	History: Function Music (2012)

History: Mob Music is a collaborative studio album by American rappers E-40 and Too Short. The album was released on November 6, 2012, by Heavy on the Grind Entertainment and EMI. The album was released in two pairs: History: Mob Music and History: Function Music. The album features guest appearances from Knotch, B-Legit, Kurupt, DJ Battlecat, T. Nelson, Beeda Weeda, Stressmatic and Rankin Scroo.

== Background ==
In April 2011, during an interview with Complex, Too Short spoke about the album originally titled The History Channel, saying:

"We’re about halfway through recording the album, maybe a little bit further than that. If we don’t get it out on the market by the end of this year, it’ll be out by the top of next year. But we’re definitely going to drop some singles and videos this year. It’s a project that we wanted to do ten years ago. We both were Jive Records artists at the time, but Jive just did not want any parts of that album and we couldn’t figure out why."

He also spoke about how many tracks would be on the album, saying: "We’re only doing 12 tracks, maybe. We’ll put some older songs that we did on there and make it a complete project. We’ll shoot a bunch of videos and drop it. But I just talked to 40 today and he was like, ‘Where we at with it?’ So the first songs we did, we got in the studio and did them all together." He also spoke about the producers on the album, saying: "[For producers we got] Solomon and his sons. It’s mostly guys that we know who are West Coast producers. We’re trying to give the homies a good look."

On April 16, 2012, E-40 announced during an interview with Vlad TV that the album would be released in two pairs titled History: Function Music and History: Mob Music. On August 31, 2012, it was announced the albums would be released on November 6, 2012.

== Critical response ==
Professional ratings
Review scores
Source	Rating
Pitchfork Media	7.8/10
RapReviews	7/10

History: Mob Music was met with generally favorable reviews from music critics. Jayson Greene of Pitchfork Media gave the album a 7.8 out of 10, saying "An enormous chunk of California rap history is contained within these two styles, and Too $hort and Forty are their avatars. Listening to them egg each other on over the course of 34 songs is a pleasure, like staying up all night drinking with two disreputable uncles." Matt Jost of RapReviews gave the album a seven out of ten, saying "If you're feeling sarcastic, "History: Mob Music" does sound like an old, broken record. And it does cater to a constituency who may want it to sound exactly that way."

== Commercial performance ==
The album debuted at number 71 on the Billboard 200, with first-week sales of 5,700 copies in the United States.

== Track listing ==
No.	Title	Producer(s)	Length
1.	"We Are Pioneers"	Droop-E	4:04
2.	"Sheesh" (featuring Stressmatic)	Sam Bostic	3:41
3.	"Fire Fighter" (featuring Knotch)	ShonuFF	3:23
4.	"Whip Out"	Droop-E	3:24
5.	"Money Motivated"	Rick Rock	4:58
6.	"Ballin' Is Fun" (featuring B-Legit)	Sam Bostic	4:09
7.	"Ride With Me"	Droop-E	4:17
8.	"Do You Remember?" (featuring Kurupt & DJ Battlecat)	DJ Battlecat	3:29
9.	"Street Money"	Demolishbeatz	4:13
10.	"My Stapler"	Benjamin Blapperson	4:36
11.	"I Don't Work For Nobody"	ShonuFF	3:52
12.	"Ask About Me" (featuring B-Legit)	Studio Tone	4:07
13.	"If We Ain't Fuckin'" (featuring T. Nelson)	Kannon "Caviar" Cross; Cory "OZ" Simon	5:02
14.	"Gang of 'Em" (featuring Beeda Weeda & Rankin Scroo)	J. Wells	3:54
15.	"Knockin' a Bitch"	Rick Rock	3:18
16.	"Poncherellos" (featuring Stressmatic)	J2	3:23
17.	"Stressin'"	Sam Bostic	4:28

== Charts ==
Chart (2012)	Peak position
US Billboard 200	71
US Top R&B/Hip-Hop Albums (Billboard)	11
US Top Rap Albums (Billboard)	7
US Independent Albums (Billboard)	10
