= Federation: The Album =

Studio album by The Federation
- Released: October 5, 2004
- Recorded: 2004
- Studio: The Federation Compound (Sacramento, CA); Infinite Studios (Alameda, CA); Chicago Recording Company (Chicago, IL)
- Genre: Hip hop; hyphy
- Length: 1:05:31
- Label: Virgin
- Producer: Big Jon Platt (exec.); Rick Rock (also exec.)

The Federation chronology
Federation: The Album (2004)	It's Whateva (2007)

Professional ratings
Review scores
Source	Rating
Allmusic	3/5 stars

Rick Rock Presents Federation: The Album is the debut studio album by American hip hop group The Federation. It was released on October 5, 2004, via Virgin Records, and was entirely produced by Rick Rock. It also features guest appearances from Daz Dillinger, E-40, and Twista among others. Despite being released for a major label, The album was poorly promoted and was a commercial failure, just managing to reach the bottom of the US Billboard 200 at number 200. The album's two singles, "Hyphy" and "Go Dumb", also failed to find much success, only reaching 88 and 95 respectively on the Billboard Hot R&B/Hip-Hop Songs chart.

The song “Mayhem” was featured on American football video game Madden NFL 2004.

== Track listing ==
No.	Title	Writer(s)	Length
1.	"Intro"	A. Caldwell	0:06
2.	"What Is It" (featuring Eldorado Red)	A. Caldwell; M. Selmon; T. Jackson; R. Thomas; G. Bradford	3:42
3.	"Hyphy" (featuring E-40)	A. Caldwell; M. Selmon; T. Jackson; R. Thomas; E. Stevens	4:31
4.	"Go Dumb"	A. Caldwell; M. Selmon; T. Jackson; R. Thomas	4:06
5.	"You Might See Me"	A. Caldwell; M. Selmon; T. Jackson; R. Thomas	3:50
6.	"Hoes in Here"	A. Caldwell; M. Selmon; T. Jackson; R. Thomas; D. McDaniels; J. Simmons; L. Smith	4:49
7.	"You Don't Want It" (featuring Battle Locco & Kinsmoke)	A. Caldwell; M. Selmon; T. Jackson; R. Thomas; D. Dew; J. East; K. Gully	4:59
8.	"Crazy" (Skit)	R. Thomas	0:52
9.	"Go to Work"	A. Caldwell; M. Selmon; T. Jackson; R. Thomas; B. Pendergrass; K. Leary; M. Clee; M. Perison; R. Thomas; R. Parison	3:41
10.	"We Ride" (featuring Daz Dillinger)	A. Caldwell; M. Selmon; T. Jackson; R. Thomas; D. Arnaud	5:08
11.	"Ghetto Love Song" (featuring Next Level)	A. Caldwell; M. Selmon; T. Jackson; R. Thomas; A. Tate; J. Tate	5:14
12.	"In Love With a Hoodrat" (featuring Undaflow)	M. Selmon; T. Jackson; R. Thomas; J. East	4:37
13.	"Donkey"	A. Caldwell; M. Selmon; T. Jackson; R. Thomas	4:21
14.	"What If I Had a Gun" (featuring Twista & Undaflow)	A. Caldwell; R. Thomas; J. East; C. Mitchell	5:22
15.	"Damn" (Interlude)	M. Selmon; R. Thomas	0:56
16.	"Damn"	A. Caldwell; M. Selmon; T. Jackson; R. Thomas	4:37
17.	"Momma Dot" (Skit)		0:35
18.	"Mayhem"	A. Caldwell; M. Selmon; T. Jackson; R. Thomas	4:05
Total length:			1:05:31

== Personnel ==
- Anthony "Goldie" Caldwell – main performer
- Marvin "Doonie Baby" Selmon – main performer
- Thomas "Stressmatic" Jackson – main performer
- Gary "Eldorado Red" Bradford – guest performer (track 2)
- Earl "E-40" Stevens – guest performer (track 3)
- Battle Locco – guest performer (track 7)
- Kinsmoke – guest performer (track 7)
- Delmar "Daz" Arnaud – guest performer (track 10)
- Next Level – guest performer (track 11)
- J. "Undaflow" East – guest performer (tracks: 12, 14)
- Carl "Twista" Mitchell – guest performer (track 14)
- Michael Denten – backing vocals (track 14), mixing (tracks: 8, 11), recording (tracks: 11, 12, 18)
- Femi Ojetunde – guitar (track 11)
- Ricardo "Rick Rock" Thomas – producer, executive producer, mixing (tracks: 5, 11, 12, 14, 16, 18), recording (track 18)
- "Big Jon" Platt – executive producer
- Richard "Segal" Huredia – mixing (tracks: 1–3, 5, 7, 12–14, 16, 18)
- Ken "Duro" Ifill – mixing (track 4)
- Kevin "KD" Davis – mixing (tracks: 6, 9, 10)
- Dustin "Nump" Perfetto – recording (tracks: 1, 7, 8, 12)
- Joe Jackson – recording (tracks: 2–7, 9–14, 16, 18), A&R
- Chris Young – engineering (tracks: 1–3, 5, 7, 11–13, 16, 18)
- Jason Stasium – engineering (track 4)
- Josh McDonnel – engineering (track 4)
- Richard Balmer – engineering (tracks: 5, 11, 12, 16, 18)
- Sean Tallman – engineering (tracks: 6, 9, 10)
- Chris Bellman – mastering
- Liza Lowinger – art direction
- Brian – art direction & design
- Jonathan Mannion – photography
- Julie Dickens – A&R
- Michelle Ryang – A&R
- Ronette Bowie – A&R
- Scott Gordon – A&R
- Wendi Cothran – A&R
- Sean Mosher-Smith – creative director

== Chart positions ==
Album

Chart (2004)	Peak position
US Billboard 200	200
US Top R&B/Hip-Hop Albums (Billboard)	51
US Heatseekers Albums (Billboard)	14
