= The D-Boy Diary: Book 1 =

Studio album by E-40
- Released: November 18, 2016
- Recorded: 2015–16
- Genre: Hip hop
- Length: 60:13
- Label: Heavy on the Grind
- Producer: Brandon "Brvndon P" Peavy; Droop-E; DecadeZ; DJ Mumblezz; iLLA; Istevie; June Onna Beat; Kent Jones; The Mekanix; Mike Free; Mally Mall; ProHoeZak; RAYTONA; Rick Rock; Scorp Dezel; Ted DiGTL; Zaytoven

E-40 chronology
Sharp On All 4 Corners: Corner 2 (2014)	The D-Boy Diary: Book 1 (2016)	The D-Boy Diary: Book 2 (2016)

The D-Boy Diary: Book 1 is the twenty-third studio album by American rapper E-40. It was released on November 18, 2016, by Heavy on the Grind Entertainment.

== Track listing ==
No.	Title	Producer(s)	Length
1.	"Stack It To the Ceiling"	The Mekanix	3:03
2.	"Straight To the Point" (featuring Ezale and G-Eazy)	DJ Mumblezz	3:24
3.	"Savage" (featuring Jazze Pha and B-Legit)	Scorp Dezel; Mally Mall	4:00
4.	"Puttin' In Work"	RAYTONA	3:41
5.	"Mr. Arm & Hammer" (featuring Stressmatic)	Rick Rock	3:41
6.	"Hunedz" (featuring Rick Rock)	Rick Rock	3:26
7.	"Fired Up" (featuring Cousin Fik)	DecadeZ	2:34
8.	"Bag on Me" (featuring KD Stunts)	DecadeZ	2:50
9.	"Say So" (featuring Istevie)	Istevie	3:43
10.	"Stay Away" (featuring Eric Bellinger)	Mike Free	3:38
11.	"Somebody" (featuring Ricco Barrino)	ProHoeZak	2:55
12.	"All Day" (featuring Gucci Mane)	Brandon "Brvndon P" Peavy	3:23
13.	"The Grit Don't Quit" (featuring Nef the Pharaoh)	Ted DiGTL	3:41
14.	"Fake Lit" (featuring June Onna Beat)	June Onna Beat	2:58
15.	"Goon Music" (featuring Stressmatic)	Droop-E	3:55
16.	"Gangsta Song" (featuring Kent Jones)	Kent Jones; iLLA	3:30
17.	"Blessed By the Game"	DecadeZ	3:07
18.	"We Flip" (featuring Cousin Fik, Choose Up Cheese and Stressmatic)	Droop-E	4:08
19.	"I Had It In a Drought" (featuring Stressmatic)	ProHoeZak	4:21
20.	"Check" (featuring Willy Will)	Zaytoven	3:59
21.	"Made It Out" (featuring Young Chu)	Scorp Dezel	3:45

== Charts ==
Chart (2016)	Peak position
US Billboard 200	178
US Top R&B/Hip-Hop Albums (Billboard)	13
