= The Federation (group) =

American hip hop group

- Also known as: Federation
- Origin: Fairfield, California
- Genres: Hip hop; hyphy
- Years active: 2002 – present
- Labels: Virgin; Reprise
- Members: Doonie Baby; Goldie; Stressmatic

The Federation is an American hip hop group from Fairfield, California. The group was formed in 2002, composed of producer Ricardo "Rick Rock" Thomas and three rappers: Anthony "Goldie Gold" Caldwell, Marvin "Doonie Baby/Doon Koon" Selmon and Thomas "Stressmatic" Jackson. The group released their debut studio album in 2004 on Virgin Records and their sophomore album through Reprise Records in 2007, which is, to date, their most recent effort.

== History ==
Rick Rock and Doonie Baby’s friendship and collaborative work dates back to the early ‘90s in Alabama, where they recorded as two-thirds of the group Cosmic Slop Shop along with Big Lurch. At age 16 and using a wheelchair after being shot, the Nevada-born, Fairfield/Vallejo-raised Federation member Goldie Gold met Rick Rock at a local mall, impressing Rock with his rapping skills. In 2002, Rick Rock recruited Doonie Baby, Goldie Gold, and Mr. Stress to form the group.

The group debuted on Vallejo producer Mike Mosely's 2002 release Major Work: The Soundtrack with the Rick Rock-produced track "The Sickness", which sampled Art of Noise's 1983 song "Moments of Love". Their first single "Hyphy", featuring E-40, debuted in 2003, the title was based on a slang term established by Keak the Sneak in the 90s Bay Area hip hop music. Hyphy became an instant hit in the Bay Area. The song even induced a riot when The Federation performed "Hyphy" during halftime of the AND1 Live Tour at Oracle Arena in June 2004. On the strength of "Hyphy" and their second single "Donkey", the group's self-titled debut album was released under Virgin Records to critical reception. In 2005, Rick Rock signed the group under Reprise Records, releasing the group's follow-up album It's Whateva in the summer of 2007.

In 2009, Stressmatic was featured in an interview in the book How to Rap, along with several other rappers, including E-40, Nelly, Tech N9ne, Twista, Pusha T, Styles P, will.i.am, DJ Quik, Kool G Rap, N.O.R.E. & Chuck D.

== Discography ==
=== Albums ===
Year	Album	Peak chart positions	
Year	Album	U.S.	U.S. R&B
2004	**Federation: The Album**: Released: October 5, 2004; Label: Virgin	200	51
2007	**It's Whateva**: Released: September 4, 2007; Label: Reprise	–	60

=== Singles ===
Year	Title	Album	Peak position
Year	Title	Album	Hot R&B/Hip-Hop Songs
2003	"So Crazy"	The Federation	–
2003	"In Love With a Hood Rat"	The Federation	–
2004	"Hyphy"	The Federation	88
2004	"Go Dumb"	The Federation	95
2004	"Donkey"	The Federation	
2006	"I Wear My Stunna Glasses At Night"	Recognize the Bay, Vol. 2	–

=== Featured singles ===
Members of the Federation have also appeared on many other songs by other Bay Area rappers, some of which received radio airplay locally. Their appearances are highlighted in bold.

Year	Title	Artist	Album
1998	Legit Hustlas	Killa Tay (featuring Laroo, **Doonie Baby** & Lil Ric)	Mr. Mafioso
2000	I Go Wit It	The Yay Boyz (featuring **The Federation** & Turf Talk)	NoseBleed Muzik
2000	Go Ignant	The Mossie (featuring E-40, Turf Talk & **The Federation**)	The Bay Area Bridges Compilation
2002	Stay Tight	Chuck Nutt (featuring **Doonie Baby**)	Give It Up for 1 Nutt 2 Many
2002	Lock & Load	Chuck Nutt (featuring **Stressmatic** & Shill Mac)	Give It Up for 1 Nutt 2 Many
2002	Mind Gone	Chuck Nutt (featuring **Stressmatic** & Ant Dogg)	Give It Up for 1 Nutt 2 Many
2002	Off the Wall	Camp I.D. (featuring **Stress**, Maguiver & Steff)	What Cha Don't Know Won't Hurt Cha
2002	Gangsta, Gangsta	Camp I.D. (featuring **Stress**, Maguiver & D&C)	What Cha Don't Know Won't Hurt Cha
2003	Gasoline	E-40 (featuring **Doonie** & Turf Talk)	Breakin' News
2004	West Up	Poppi Cas (featuring Mugzi & **Stressmatic**)	Lifestyles of the Disobayish
2004	We Gangsters	PSD (featuring Eldorado Red & **Doonie Baby**)	Boss Ballin' the Next Line of Hitters
2004	Big Things	Turf Talk (featuring Kaveo & **Doonie Baby**)	Boss Ballin' the Next Line of Hitters
2004	Top of Lolo's	Kilo (featuring **Goldie Gold**, Undaflow, The Mayor Manky & Runaway)	Boss Ballin' the Next Line of Hitters
2004	Give Me Love	Undaflow (featuring A2thaK, Akada & **Stressmatic**)	Boss Ballin' the Next Line of Hitters
2004	Gunz Pop	Laroo T.H.H. (featuring Husalah & **Stressmatic**)	Bay Area Muscle - A True Story
2004	Hall of Fame	Laroo T.H.H. (featuring Lil Ric & **Doonie Baby**)	Bay Area Muscle - A True Story
2004	Tycoonin	Laroo (featuring Keak da Sneak & **Doonie Baby**)	Hood Journal
2004	Fed Game	Poppi Cas (featuring **Stressmatic**)	
2004	It's Ah Slumper	Turf Talk (featuring E-40 & **Stressmatic**)	The Street Novelist
2004	24 Feelin' Way O.G.	Turf Talk (featuring E-40 & **Goldie Gold**)	The Street Novelist
2004	Head Bust	Turf Talk (featuring E-40 & **Goldie Gold**)	The Street Novelist
2004	Gas, Break, Dip	E-40 (featuring **The Federation**)	The Best of E-40: Yesterday, Today & Tomorrow
2005	I Got Grapes	Nump (featuring E-40 and **The Federation**)	The NUMP Yard
2005	Shake Yo Helmet	Automatic (featuring Dirty Mackin and Goldie)	Paving The Way
2005	Run Yo' Mouth	Ya Boy (featuring **Goldie**, Boo Banga, R-Geezy & Infamous JD)	Rookie of the Year
2005	Cars, Clubs, Whatever	Nasty Nate (featuring **The Federation**)	Custom Made
2005	Whatugonedo?	Celly Cel (featuring **Stressmatic**)	It'z Real Out Here
2005	Scrape with Me	Celly Cel (featuring Juvenile & **The Federation**)	It'z Real Out Here
2006	15's	Skrillz (featuring C-Bo, **Goldie Gold** & Streetz)	The Bay Movement
2006	Bay Blindness	Laroo T.H.H. (featuring **The Federation**)	Timeless Music
2006	Da Streets	Laroo T.H.H. (featuring Keak da Sneak, Luni Coleone & **The Federation**)	Timeless Music
2006	Bay Bidness	Laroo T.H.H. (featuring **The Federation**)	Push tha Line
2006	Rap Bully	Laroo T.H.H. (featuring **Doon Koon**)	Push tha Line
2006	Thizz Face	Laroo T.H.H. (featuring Turf Talk & **Doon Koon**)	Push tha Line
2006	Good Times	Laroo T.H.H. (featuring Keak da Sneak, **Goldie** & Luni Coleone)	Push tha Line
2006	Peecoat	Laroo T.H.H. (featuring **The Federation**)	Push tha Line
2006	Rush the Bar	The Mossie (featuring **Goldie Gold** & **Stressmatic**)	Soil Savvy
2006	Thick	The Mossie (featuring **Stressmatic**)'	Soil Savvy
2006	Pink Panther	The DB'z (featuring **Doonie Baby**)	Speakin' In Mannish
2006	Yes	The DB'z (featuring **Stressmatic**)	Speakin' In Mannish
2006	Them Boyz in the Scrapaz	The DB'z (featuring **Stressmatic** & Honey)	Speakin' In Mannish
2006	Get on the Floor	The DB'z (featuring **Doonie Baby**)	Speakin' In Mannish
2006	Scrape Scoot	Big Rich (featuring **Stressmatic** & J-Dubb)	Block Tested Hood Approved
2006	Go Hard or Go Home	E-40 (featuring **The Federation**)	My Ghetto Report Card
2006	Gouda	E-40 (featuring B-Legit & **Stressmatic**)	My Ghetto Report Card
2006	Block Boi	E-40 (featuring Miko and **Stressmatic**)	My Ghetto Report Card
2006	Ride and Scrape	THC (featuring **The Federation**)	Mob Report
2006	Switchin' Lanes	Droop-E & B-Slimm (featuring **Stressmatic** & Choppa of Making the Band)	The Fedi Fetcher & the Money Stretcher
2006	Surf	Droop-E & B-Slimm (featuring **Stressmatic**)	The Fedi Fetcher & the Money Stretcher
2006	I'm In the Streets	Eldorado Red, Rick Rock	East Side Rydah, Vol. 1
2006	Go All Out	Plain of 591 (featuring Turf Talk, **Goldie** & Fiji Bo)	The Main Event
2006	My Cutlass	Luni Coleone (featuring Guce, Keak da Sneak & **Doonie Baby**)	Global Recall
2006	Hands N' de Air	Honest Bob (featuring **The Federation** & Kaz Kyzah)	Boss Game
2006	Turf Dancing	DJ Shadow (featuring **The Federation**)	The Outsider
2006	Gettin My Dough	Cashis (featuring **The Federation**)	Gutta Muzik 2
2006	A Man That Goes	Selau (featuring **Goldie Gold**)	Recognize the Bay, Vol. 2
2007	Wit tha S**t	Bueno (featuring **Goldie Gold**)	The Sacramento B
2007	Recognize	Cencere (featuring Cutthroat of Goodfelonz, Gabz, Geez & **Goldie**)	Pay Me or Pay Me No Attention, Vol. 1
2007	Go Girl	Tito B (featuring Lil Coner & **Goldie Gold**)	Starz the Limit
2007	Hyphy Cat	Bumbalo (featuring Mistah F.A.B. & **Goldie Gold**)	Bumbalo
2007	Shoot Dat Dummy Juice!	J-Dub Luciano (featuring **Goldie Gold**)	Mandatory Hyphy, Vol. 1
2007	Shake Yo Helmet	Automatic (featuring **Goldie Gold** & Dirty Mackin')	Paving the Way
2007	Out of Control	Automatic (featuring **Goldie Gold**)	Paving the Way
2007	On Who?	Gutta Mob (featuring **Stressmatic**)	Gutta or Nuttin'
2007	Hard	So Official (featuring Droop-E, E-40 & **Stressmatic**)	So Official'
2007	Tap Dance	So Official (featuring **Goldie Gold** & **Stressmatic**)	So Official'
2007	Shots Go Off	Carlo Sauce (featuring **Goldie Gold**)	Gunsmoke and Mirrors
2007	Game By the Throat	Don Greco (featuring Undaflow, **Goldie Gold** & **Stressmatic**)	The Movement
2007	Northern Cali	Don Greco (featuring C-Bo & **Goldie Gold**)	The Movement
2007	Soak Game	Don Greco (featuring **Doonie Baby**, The Jacka & Jimmy Roses)	The Movement
2007	Here We Go Again	Don Greco (featuring The Jacka, **Goldie Gold** & Benny Blanco)	The Movement
2007	I Know People	Don Greco (featuring Big Nige, **Doonie Baby**)	The Movement
2007	A & T's	Don Greco (featuring Kurupt & **Goldie Gold**)	The Movement
2007	Comin' 4 U	Don Greco (featuring A-Bless & **Doonie Baby**)	The Movement
2007	Foot 2 the Floor	Amir/500 (featuring **Goldie Gold**)	
2008	Throwin' Sev'z Up	Zipper Louie (featuring **Doonie Baby**)	Ghetto Graduite, Vol. 2
2008	Get Money	Hustle Boys (featuring **Doonie Baby**)	Freshman Rookies of the Year
2008	Respected	Bugzy (featuring **The Federation**)	No New Jack
2008	Lose My Number	Nump (featuring **Goldie Gold**, Ray Rydah & Rae)	The Frat House Mixtape, Vol. 1
2008	Oh Okay	JPIGG (featuring Marty James & **Goldie Gold**)	Advent Musik
2008	Spillin' My Drink	Roscoe Umali (featuring **The Federation**)	I Love My DJs, Vol. 2
2008	Blaaw!!!	Roscoe Umali (featuring **Stressmatic** & Young Keno)	I Love My DJs, Vol. 2
2008	Gotta Get This Paper	Roscoe Umali (featuring Young Keno, Damani, **Stressmatic** & Wali Ali)	I Love My DJs, Vol. 2
2008	Quit Actin' Like	Roscoe Umali (featuring Rob G & **Stressmatic**)	I Love My DJs, Vol. 2
2008	Day In, Day Out	Late (featuring Jon Conners, Lo-Key, **Stress**, Brick Savvy, Famoso & Mokeout)	20 Thousand & Late
2008	For the Mob	The Jacka (featuring **The Federation**)	The Street Album
2009	What You Drinkin'	Krytykal (featuring **Doonie Baby**)	Success Is the Best Revenge
2009	Keep It Lit	Krytykal (featuring **Goldie Gold**)	Success Is the Best Revenge
2009	Forever Gona Hold It Down	One Loco (featuring **Doon Koon**, Lil Raider & Chongo)	Valley Thuggin'
2009	West Coast Hustlin'	One Loco (featuring **Doon Koon**, Mac Reese & Lil Raider)	Valley Thuggin'
2009	Get There	JT the Bigga Figga & Juvenile (featuring Mac Mall & **The Federation**)	South West Bosses
2009	Pills	Lil Raider (featuring **Doonie Baby** & Don Greco)	They Predicted I'd Be Dead or N Prison
2009	Just Like	Lil Raider (featuring X-YLE, QP & **Doonie Baby**)	They Predicted I'd Be Dead or N Prison
2009	Take Your Number	Lil Raider (featuring Don Greco, Mac Mall, Skuba & **Doon Koon**)	Half Baked: The Mixtape
2009	Thuggin' in the Streets	Lil Raider (featuring **Doon Koon** & Big Tone)	Half Baked: The Mixtape
2009	I Keep a Pistol	"Baby" C-Style (featuring **Goldie Gold**)	CSIC
2009	Pimpin'	Young Dru (featuring **The Federation** & Jay Tee)	Block Star
2009	Pop One of These	Paul Wall (featuring Too Short, Skinhead Rob & **The Federation**)	Fast Life
2009	Northern Cali	Big Nige (featuring Ios Da Mos, **Goldie Gold** & Doon Koon)	A Day In the Life of a Hustlinaire
2009	On Everythang	Krypto (featuring **Goldie Gold**)	Pieces to My Puzzle
2009	Keep It Organic	Nump (featuring **Goldie Gold** & Smigg Dirtee)	Student Ov Da Game
2009	Talk Ta Yew	Nump (featuring **Doon Koon** & Konnex)	The Gorillapino Comp
2009	Wit the	AP.9 (featuring **Goldie Gold**, Marvaless, T-Nutty & Killa Tay)	Reality Check
2009	Hit It Ok	Marinello Records (featuring **Goldie Gold**)	The Early Years...
2009	How They Do	Outrageous (featuring 206-Assassin, Enormous Tha Ox & **Goldie Gold**)	Strong Arm Thizz Latin, Vol. 1
2009	Switch Lanes	Born Devine (featuring **The Federation**)	Born In the Game (Birth of a Don)
2010	On that Vodka	E-40 (featuring **Goldie Gold**)	Synth City
2010	The Weedman	E-40 (featuring **Stressmatic**)	Revenue Retrievin': Day Shift
2010	Sweet Dreams 2K	C-Dat (featuring **Goldie Gold**)	First Class Ride
2010	Icey Cold	Biaje (featuring **Goldie Gold** & Beeda Weeda)	Grinding Anthems
2010	Sittin' On Buttons	Lil Raider (featuring **Goldie Gold**)	24/7 The Pickup
2010	Crimz N Tearz	One Loco (featuring **Doon Koon**)	4th Generation Cali4nia Boy
2010	Kingpin Status	Ad Kapone (featuring **Goldie** & Alias Tone)	Kingpin: The Year 6 Theory
2010	Just Go	Bueno (featuring **Goldie Gold** & Selau)	Maloof Money
2010	Addicted to You	I5 Connect (featuring **Goldie Gold**)	The First 48
2010	Sweet In My Suitte	I5 Connect (featuring **Goldie Gold**)	The First 48
2011	Yes Sir	Advanced Advertising (featuring Raekwon, Crooked I, Ghostface Killah & **Stressmatic**)	The Live & Direct Show
2011	Get Money Get Doe	Advanced Advertising (featuring **The Federation**)	The Live & Direct Show
2011	All Gas	Notes (featuring Keak Da Sneak, **Goldie Gold** & Outrageous)	The Saran Wrap Rapper
2011	Rear View Mirror	E-40 (featuring B-Legit & **Stressmatic**)	Revenue Retrievin': Overtime Shift
2011	My Lil Grimey N***a	E-40 (featuring **Stressmatic**)	Revenue Retrievin': Graveyard Shift
2011	Back & Forth	E-40 (featuring Cousin Fik, Turf Talk & **Stressmatic**)	Revenue Retrievin': Graveyard Shift
2011	Bad B***h	E-40 (featuring **Stressmatic** & Droop-E)	Revenue Retrievin': Graveyard Shift
2011	Loaded Weapon	DJ Crook (featuring Philthy Rich, Bailey, Laroo & **Goldie Gold**	Stompilation, Vol. 2
2011	Have a Party	DJ Crook (featuring **The Federation** & Sleepy D)	Stompilation, Vol. 2
2011	We Get It	DJ Crook (featuring **Goldie Gold** & Dem Hoodstarz)	Stompilation, Vol. 2
2011	In a Rush	DJ Crook (featuring Beeda Weeda, Axion, Laroo & **Goldie Gold**)	Stompilation, Vol. 2
2011	Take It Off	DJ Crook (featuring **Goldie Gold**)	Stompilation, Vol. 2
2011	Opposite of Broke	Work Dirty (featuring **Stressmatic**)	B.O.S.S. (Bread Ova Sucka S**t)
2011	From the Streetz of California	Big Tone (featuring **Doonie**)	From the Streetz of California
2011	Right Now	Big Tone (featuring **Doonie**)	From the Streetz of California
2011	Quiet Storm	Big Tone (featuring **Doonie**)	From the Streetz of California
2011	Henney in My Cup	Mikey Barber (featuring **Goldie Gold**)	Hustler of the Year
2011	Lady	Lil Raider (featuring **Doonie Baby**)	Half Baked Eyeball'n Ounces - Smoke Sessions, Vol. 2
2011	My Game	Young Go (featuring Mack Littles & **Goldie Gold**)	Fly Boy Flashy
2011	Monsterish	Illa Sevearr (featuring Messy Marv & **Goldie Gold**)	Scarred Intelligence
2011	Take My Number (bonus track)	Skuba (featuring Mac Mall, **Doonie Baby** & Don Greco)	Skuba and The Perfect Team Present: Turning Out - The Compilation
2011	No Other (remix)	Skuba (featuring Slim, Boo Banga & **Goldie**)	Skuba and The Perfect Team Present: Turning Out - The Compilation
2012	Stove on High	E-40 (featuring **Stressmatic**)	The Block Brochure: Welcome to the Soil 3
2012	Fairfield Reppin'	Mac Reese (featuring Kaboo & **Goldie Gold**)	Fairfield's Most Hated Pt. 3
2012	2 da Muny	Mac Reese (featuring **Goldie Gold**)	Still a Federation N***h
2012	Cook Coke	J. Stalin (featuring E-40 & **Stressmatic**)	Memoirs of a Curb Server
2012	Make a Million	D-Shot (featuring **Stressmatic**)	Ghetto
2012	She's Ready to Go (featuring **Stressmatic**)	Me	Two Bottle Minimum
2012	This S**t Pound	E-40 & Too Short (featuring **Stressmatic**)	History: Function Music
2012	Sheesh	E-40 & Too Short (featuring **Stressmatic**)	History: Mob Music
2012	Pancherellos	E-40 & Too Short (featuring **Stressmatic**)	History: Mob Music
2012	Strange Places (Remix)	No Face Phantom (featuring **Stressmatic** & **Doon Koon**)	The Network
2012	Actavis	Yung X (featuring **Goldie Gold** & Ike Dolla)	X-Man
2012	There They Go	Keak da Sneak (featuring Big Hollis & **Goldie Gold**)	CheddarCheeselSay
2013	Off the Block (featuring **Stressmatic** & J. Banks)	E-40	The Block Brochure: Welcome to the Soil 5
2013	Gold Chain (featuring **Stressmatic**)	Hot	Dope
2014	Google Dz Nuttz (featuring Yung Lott, Nio da Gift, Roach Gigz, Cousin Fik, Moe Green, **Goldie Gold**, **Stressmatic**, D-Lo, Agerman, Rich Rap, Angel Deski, Homewrecka, Mistah F.A.B. & Gorilla Pits)	Kobra Abysmal	The 48 Hour Project
2015	On My Line (featuring The Federation)	Rick Rock	Rocket The Album
2015	Dopeman (featuring **Stressmatic**)	Redman	Mudface
2016	Mr. Arm And Hammer (featuring **Stressmatic**)	E-40	The D-Boy Diary: Book 1
2016	Goon Music (featuring **Stressmatic**)	E-40	The D-Boy Diary: Book 1
2016	We Flip (featuring Cousin Fik, Choose Up Cheese & **Stressmatic**)	E-40	The D-Boy Diary: Book 1
2016	I Had It In A Drought (featuring **Stressmatic**)	E-40	The D-Boy Diary: Book 1
2016	Paid Off (featuring **Stressmatic**)	E-40	The D-Boy Diary: Book 2
2017	Swivel (featuring **Stressmatic**)	Snoop Dogg	Neva Left
2017	Still Slappin' (featuring **Stressmatic**)	Omar Aura	
2018	Ballhog (featuring **Stressmatic**)	E-40	Gift of Gab
2018	Life Lessons (featuring **Stressmatic**)	E-40, B-Legit	Connected and Respected
2018	Meet the Dealers (featuring **Stressmatic**)	E-40, B-Legit	Connected and Respected
2018	Barbershop (featuring **Stressmatic**)	E-40, B-Legit	Connected and Respected
2018	10 Bad B*tches (featuring **Stressmatic**)	Too Short	The Sex Tape Playlist
2019	Main Phone (featuring Rick Rock & **Stressmatic**)	Snoop Dogg	I Wanna Thank Me
2019	Wake They Shit Up (featuring B-Legit & **Stressmatic**)	E-40	Practice Makes Paper
2019	Facts Not Fiction (featuring **Stressmatic**)	E-40	Practice Makes Paper
2019	Surroundings (featuring **Stressmatic**)	E-40	Practice Makes Paper
2023	It's Complicated (featuring '**Stressmatic'**)	E-40	Rule of Thumb: Rule 1
2026	Car Dance (featuring **Stressmatic** and WhoInGodsName)	E-40	Turning My Money Over
2026	Blessed (featuring **Stressmatic**)	E-40	Turning My Money Over
2026	Trunk is Alive (featuring Too Short, **Stressmatic**, and B-Legit)	E-40	Turning My Money Over
2026	Trenches (featuring **Stressmatic**)	E-40	Turning My Money Over
