= History: Function Music =

Studio album by E-40 and Too Short
- Released: November 6, 2012
- Recorded: 2010–2012
- Genre: Hip-hop
- Length: 60:04
- Label: Heavy on the Grind; EMI
- Producer: DecadeZ; ShonuFF; Scorp Dezel; Dupri; Willy Will; Rick Rock; Droop-E; Traxamillion; Tone Bone; AJ; D Nyce; DJ Upgrade

E-40 chronology
The Block Brochure: Welcome to the Soil 3 (2012)	History: Function Music (2012)	History: Mob Music (2012)

Singles from History: Function Music
- 1. "Dump Truck" Released: September 20, 2012

Too Short chronology
History: Mob Music (2012)	History: Function Music (2012)	The Pimp Tape (2018)

History: Function Music is a collaborative studio album by American rappers E-40 and Too Short. The album was released on November 6, 2012, by Heavy on the Grind Entertainment and EMI. The album was released in two pairs: History: Mob Music and History: Function Music. The album features guest appearances from Tyga, Travis Porter, Turf Talk, Wiz Khalifa, Suga Free, Jeremih, and Ice Cube among others.

== Background ==
In April 2011, during an interview with Complex, Too Short spoke about the album originally titled The History Channel, saying:

"We’re about halfway through recording the album, maybe a little bit further than that. If we don’t get it out on the market by the end of this year, it’ll be out by the top of next year. But we’re definitely going to drop some singles and videos this year. It’s a project that we wanted to do ten years ago. We both were Jive Records artists at the time, but Jive just did not want any parts of that album and we couldn’t figure out why."

He continued: "[This was around the time] Redman and Method Man [did Blackout!]. Jive just did not want that album to come out. I almost did an album with Lil Jon back when he was on TVT and Jive turned that down too. I don’t know what they had against collabos. I have no idea, but I look back on it and a lot of Jive artists have really never collaborated with each other. [Laughs.] It must be something they do over there. We would have made so much money together ten years ago. But we both waited it out. We waited until we both got out of Jive and we talked about it one day and said, ‘You know what? Now is a good damn time to do that album."

He also spoke about how many tracks would be on the album, saying: "We’re only doing 12 tracks, maybe. We’ll put some older songs that we did on there and make it a complete project. We’ll shoot a bunch of videos and drop it. But I just talked to 40 today and he was like, ‘Where we at with it?’ So the first songs we did, we got in the studio and did them all together. Now we’ve got the whole nucleus of the album. And we know which beats [we want] because we’ve picked all the tracks. And now we’re like, ‘You do your part in your studio, I’ll do mine in my studio, and you can send me an email." He continued: "All I can tell you is, all of the good product you got from E-40 with all the good product you got from Too $hort—it’s almost impossible for us to make a terrible album together. We’re both opinionated, so I damn sure am not co-signing a song that I think is wack. Whether I’m on it or not, I’m like, 'It’s wack! I don’t like it.' [Laughs.]"

He also spoke about the producers on the album, saying: "[For producers we got] Solomon and his sons. It’s mostly guys that we know who are West Coast producers. We’re trying to give the homies a good look. I guarantee you the beats are the shit. Definitely some features. We haven’t done the all-star lineup yet, but it’s definitely going to be some features. Wiz Khalifa is going to be on the album. That was the deal we made: I was going to do some work for him and he was going to do some work with us. That’s how we do it. It’s called the trade-off man."

== Release and promotion ==
On April 16, 2012, E-40 announced during an interview with Vlad TV that the album would be released in two pairs titled History: Function Music and History: Mob Music. On August 31, 2012, it was announced the albums would be released on November 6, 2012. On September 20, 2012, the album's first single "Dump Truck" featuring Travis Porter and Young Chu was released. On October 17, 2012, the music video was released for "Dump Truck" featuring Travis Porter and Young Chu. On November 6, 2012, the music video was released for "Slide Through" featuring Tyga. On December 5, 2012, the music video was released for "Say I" featuring Wiz Khalifa. On January 16, 2013, the music video was released for "Bout My Money" featuring Jeremih and Turk Talk.

== Critical response ==
Professional ratings
Review scores
Source	Rating
AllMusic	3.5/5 stars
Pitchfork	7.8/10
RapReviews	6/10

History: Function Music was met with generally favorable reviews from music critics. Jayson Greene of Pitchfork gave the album a 7.8 out of 10, saying "The production is split down the middle between the flashier, more carefree, hyphy-influenced production (E-40 calls it "function music") that has become the speciality of E-40's in-house production stable—as usual, his son Droop-E contributes the most sonically inventive tracks—and heavier, more minimal "mob music." An enormous chunk of California rap history is contained within these two styles, and Too $hort and Forty are their avatars. Listening to them egg each other on over the course of 34 songs is a pleasure, like staying up all night drinking with two disreputable uncles." Matt Jost of RapReviews gave the album a six out of ten, saying "With the "Revenue Retrievin'" and "The Block Brochure" series E-40 has trained his audience to accept overloaded collections of new music. "History" relies heavily on his infrastructure (label, producers, Stresmatic for hooks, etc.). He makes every effort to turn this into an equal partnership, and yet at least "Function Music" feels like one of his records. Still E-40's senior by several years, Too $hort apparently doesn't mind, summing up "History: Function Music" with a simple but apt "We havin' fun on this album."

David Jeffries of AllMusic gave the album three and a half stars out of five, saying "Guest shots come from big names like Ice Cube ("West Coast Shit"), Tyga ("Slide Through"), and Wiz Khalifa ("Say I"), while the production comes from the likes of Traxamillion and Rick Rock, along with DecadeZ, from Bakersfield who has hands in five futuristic thug tracks, sounding as if Kraftwerk just discovered bounce music. Even if the layout of tracks is a bit sloppy with some redundant cuts placed too close, these veterans of sex and party rap can still beat expectations when it comes to hooks, jokes, and flow, so check it if your weekend needs more booty worship and/or big bass bombs."

== Commercial performance ==
The album debuted at number 62 on the Billboard 200, with first-week sales of 6,500 copies in the United States. In its second week the album sold 2,600 more copies bringing its total album sales to 9,100.

== Track listing ==
No.	Title	Producer(s)	Length
1.	"This Shit Pound" (featuring Stressmatic)	DecadeZ	3:57
2.	"Slide Through" (featuring Tyga)	DecadeZ	3:21
3.	"Smoke That Shit"	DecadeZ	3:29
4.	"Let's Have A Party" (featuring Cousin Fik & Knotch)	ShonuFF	3:31
5.	"Dump Truck" (featuring Travis Porter & Young Chu)	Scorp Dezel	4:11
6.	"Singles"	Dupri	4:02
7.	"Entrepreneur"	Willy Will	2:54
8.	"Bout My Money" (featuring Jeremih & Turf Talk)	Rick Rock	4:02
9.	"Say I" (featuring Wiz Khalifa)	Droop-E	3:51
10.	"Workin' the Trunk"	Traxamillion	4:23
11.	"West Coast Shit" (featuring Ice Cube)	ToneBonebeats	3:55
12.	"One Foot" (featuring Suga Free)	AJ	3:38
13.	"Check That Bitch"	D Nyce	3:47
14.	"Everyday"	ShonuFF	3:31
15.	"Lemme See You Twerk" (featuring Dolla Will & Decadez)	DecadeZ	3:26
16.	"Toasted" (featuring Decadez & Lil' Skeeter)	DecadeZ	3:38
17.	"Cali" (featuring Wifey & DJ Upgrade)	DJ Upgrade	4:53

== Charts ==
Chart (2012)	Peak position
US Billboard 200	62
US Top R&B/Hip-Hop Albums (Billboard)	9
US Top Rap Albums (Billboard)	6
US Independent Albums (Billboard)	9
