= It's Whateva =

Studio album by The Federation
- Released: September 4, 2007
- Recorded: 2006–2007
- Studio: Boomboom Room (Los Angeles, CA); Conway Studios (Hollywood, CA); Infinite Sound Studios (Alameda, CA); Rick Rock House Of Hits (Sacramento, CA); Skip Saylors Studios (Hollywood, CA); Interprise Studios; Right Trax Studio
- Genre: West Coast hip hop; hyphy
- Length: 1:18:14
- Label: Reprise; Warner Bros.
- Producer: Rick Rock

The Federation chronology
Federation: The Album (2004)	It's Whateva (2007)

Professional ratings
Review scores
Source	Rating
Allmusic	3.5/5 stars
PopMatters	9/10 stars
Robert Christgau	(2-star Honorable Mention)
XXL	8/10 stars

It's Whateva is the second studio album American hip hop group The Federation. It was released on September 4, 2007 via Warner Bros. Records and Reprise Records, and was entirely produced by Rick Rock. It also features guest appearances from Ca$his, E-40, Marty James, and Snoop Dogg among others. The album peaked at number 60 on the US Billboard Top R&B/Hip-Hop Albums chart and number 23 on the Top Rap Albums chart.

== Track listing ==
No.	Title	Length
1.	"Playtime Is Over"	4:46
2.	"18 Dummy" (Skit)	0:10
3.	"18 Dummy"	3:48
4.	"Get Naked You Beezy"	3:49
5.	"College Girl" (Skit) (featuring Pimpin' Rico)	0:38
6.	"College Girl"	5:15
7.	"Got Me Fucked Up"	4:10
8.	"From the Bay"	4:51
9.	"My Rimz"	4:30
10.	"Happy I Met You" (featuring Snoop Dogg)	4:15
11.	"Scraper 2 a Benz" (featuring E-40)	4:49
12.	"She Go" (featuring Marty James)	3:40
13.	"New Baby Daddy"	3:57
14.	"We on Yo Line" (featuring Ca$his)	4:26
15.	"Black Roses"	4:08
16.	"Jail" (Skit) (featuring Battle Locco)	1:19
17.	"Fly Away"	4:44
18.	"When I Was Yo Man" (Skit) (featuring Doonie Baby)	0:30
19.	"When I Was Yo Man"	4:43
20.	"Bang Bang" (featuring Tony Hard Times, Battle Locco, Mank Manson, Eldorado Red, Rick Rock, Tick & Undaflow)	6:13
21.	"Break Your Face"	4:50
Total length:		1:18:14

Sample credits

- "Get Naked You Beezy" contains elements from "The Doggie in the Window" by Patti Page (1953)
- "My Rimz" contains elements from "Nite and Day" by Al B. Sure! (1988)

== Chart positions ==
Chart (2007)	Peak position
US Top R&B/Hip-Hop Albums (Billboard)	60
US Top Rap Albums (Billboard)	23
US Heatseekers Albums (Billboard)	26
