= What We Been Doin =

Studio album by B-Legit
- Released: April 14, 2015
- Genre: Hip-hop
- Length: 43:46
- Label: Empire Distribution

B-Legit chronology
Coast 2 Coast (2007)	What We Been Doin (2015)	Connected and Respected (2018)

What We Been Doin is the seventh studio album by American rapper B-Legit, released through Empire Distribution on April 14, 2015.

== Track listing ==
1. "M.O.B. (Money Over Bullshit)" (featuring Ocky Ocky) - 3:34
2. "Loaded" (featuring Ted DiGTL, Ocky Ocky, & Taj-He-Spitz) - 3:57
3. "Gud Gud (Like me)" (featuring J. Banks, Richie Rich, & Ted DiGTL) - 5:21
4. "What We Been Doin" (featuring E-40 & Ted DiGTL) 3:30
5. "Make a B*tch" (featuring Faith & Problem) - 2:30
6. "Marijuana" (featuring Berner) - 3:20
7. "Hella Bad" (featuring Cousin Fik) - 3:27
8. "Workout" (featuring E-40 & T2OAM) - 3:16
9. "Beast" (featuring Ted Digtl, Ocky Ocky, Taj-He-Spitz) - 3:39
10. "Wytb" (What You Talkin Bout) (featuring Clyde Carson) - 3:00
11. "Oh She" (featuring Marty JayR) 3:50
12. "Best Friend" (featuring J Boog) - 4:32

== Personnel ==
- B-Legit

=== Featured artists ===
- Berner
- Clyde Carson
- Cousin Fik
- Ted Digtl
- E-40
- Faith
- J Boog
- J-Banks
- Marty Jayr
- Ocky Ocky
- Problem
- Richie Rich
- T20am
- Taj-He-Spitz

=== Producers ===
- Joshua M. Blaxon
- Cosmo
- Mekanix
- Maxwell Smart

== Charts ==
Chart (2015)	Peak position
US Top R&B/Hip-Hop Albums	23
US Independent Albums	24
US Top Rap Albums	18
