= The D-Boy Diary: Book 2 =

Studio album by E-40
- Released: November 18, 2016
- Recorded: 2015–16
- Genre: Hip hop
- Length: 60:17
- Label: Heavy on the Grind
- Producer: Brandon "Brvndon P" Peavy; Baby Treeze; Chris "B-Man" Alcorn; Dave Beats; Disko Boogie; Droop-E; DecadeZ; Fre$h On the Beat; June Onna Beat; Lil B; Nard & B; Nonstop Da Hitman; Rick Rock; ReeceBeats; Scorp Dezel; Ted DiGTL; Willy Will; XL Eagle; Zest

E-40 chronology
The D-Boy Diary: Book 1 (2016)	The D-Boy Diary: Book 2 (2016)	Connected and Respected (2018)

The D-Boy Diary: Book 2 is the twenty-fourth studio album by American rapper E-40. It was released on November 18, 2016, by Heavy on the Grind Entertainment.

== Track listing ==
No.	Title	Producer(s)	Length
1.	"Bring Back the Sideshow" (featuring Mistah F.A.B. and Nef the Pharaoh)	Fre$h On the Beat	3:32
2.	"Money" (featuring Mozzy and Jay Rock)	Rick Rock	4:00
3.	"This Goin' Up" (featuring Husalah and Turf Talk)	Chris "B-Man" Alcorn	3:32
4.	"On One" (featuring A.D.)	DecadeZ	3:02
5.	"Get Money or Get Lost"	Rick Rock	2:37
6.	"Highway" (featuring B-Legit and Tresolid)	Ted DiGTL	4:16
7.	"Sick Out Here" (featuring Droop-E)	Droop-E	3:23
8.	"Thank U" (featuring Willy Will)	Willy Will	4:08
9.	"Military Time" (featuring Salsalino and Baby Treeze)	Baby Treeze	4:03
10.	"Uh Huh" (featuring YV)	DecadeZ	4:14
11.	"2 Seater" (featuring Kid Ink)	Nard & B; XL Eagle	3:29
12.	"What Is It Gone Be" (featuring D-Day and Tamoya Bell)	Zest (A Just Plain Ghetto Production)	3:46
13.	"How Do U Like That"	DecadeZ	3:28
14.	"I Know a Guy"	June Onna Beat	3:55
15.	"All I Know" (featuring K Camp and Casey Veggies)	Brandon "Brvndon P" Peavy	3:28
16.	"Waitin' On a Play" (featuring Nicamari)	Scorp Dezel	2:57
17.	"Tycoon"	Nonstop Da Hitman	3:50
18.	"Broke Bitches" (featuring Joe Moses and Jay 305)	Disko Boogie	3:29
19.	"Flash On These Bitches" (featuring Lil B)	Lil B	3:44
20.	"Too Many"	Dave Beats	4:17
21.	"Paid Off" (featuring Stressmatic)	ReeceBeats	3:52

== Charts ==
Chart (2016)	Peak position
US Top R&B/Hip-Hop Albums (Billboard)	14
