= Hard 2 B-Legit =

Studio album by B-Legit
- Released: September 24, 2002
- Genre: Hip hop
- Length: 54:17
- Label: Koch
- Producer: E-A-Ski; Rick Rock; Studio Ton

B-Legit chronology
| Hempin' Ain't Easy (2000) | Hard 2 B-Legit (2002) | Block Movement (2005) |

Professional ratings
Review scores
| Source | Rating |
|---|---|
| AllMusic | 3/5 stars |

Hard 2 B-Legit is the fourth solo studio album by American rapper B-Legit. It was released on September 24, 2002, via Koch Records. The album was produced by Rick Rock, E-A-Ski, and Studio Ton, among others. It features guest appearances from Harm, Rick Rock, E-40, Jae Rilla, Ray J, Suga Free, Too Short, and Yountie.

The album peaked at number 111 on the Billboard 200, number 17 on the Top R&B/Hip-Hop Albums and number 6 on the Independent Albums in the United States.

== Track listing ==
| No. | Title | Writer(s) | Length |
|---|---|---|---|
| 1. | "I'm Singlin'" (featuring Rick Rock and Harm) | Brandt Jones | 3:45 |
| 2. | "If You Don't Know Me" | Jones | 3:39 |
| 3. | "Whatcha Talkin'" (featuring Harm) | Jones | 4:10 |
| 4. | "Bag Habit" (featuring Rick Rock) | Jones | 2:59 |
| 5. | "1 Dame" (featuring Harm) | Jones | 3:47 |
| 6. | "Luv 2 Get High" | Jones | 4:30 |
| 7. | "Fo' Real" (featuring Yountie) | Jones | 4:04 |
| 8. | "So International" (featuring Too $hort) | Jones; Todd Shaw; Ricardo Thomas; Christopher Frantz; Tina Weymouth; Adrian Belew; Steven J. C. Stanley | 3:34 |
| 9. | "What U Thought" (featuring Suga Free) | | 3:46 |
| 10. | "Play 2 Much" (featuring Ray J) | Jones; James Hardy-Martin | 4:06 |
| 11. | "Straight Fool" (featuring E-40) | Jones; Earl Stevens; Thomas | 3:52 |
| 12. | "Keep It Movin'" (featuring Harm and Jae Rilla) | Jones | 3:48 |
| 13. | "We Get Dough" (featuring Harm) | | 3:54 |
| 14. | "Feelin'" | Jones | 4:23 |
| Total length: | | | 54:17 |

== Charts ==
| Chart (2002) | Peak position |
|---|---|
| US Billboard 200 | 111 |
| US Top R&B/Hip-Hop Albums (Billboard) | 17 |
| US Independent Albums (Billboard) | 6 |
