= Grit & Grind =

Studio album by E-40
- Released: July 9, 2002
- Recorded: 2001–2002
- Genre: Hip hop
- Length: 1:09:44
- Labels: Sick Wid It; Jive
- Producers: Afroman; B. Bumble; Bosko; Lil' Jon; Michael "Mike D" Dinkins; Mike Mosley; Rick Rock; Sam Bostic; Smash; Steve Vicious; Tone Capone

E-40 chronology
Loyalty and Betrayal (2000)	Grit & Grind (2002)	Breakin' News (2003)

Singles from Grit & Grind
- 1. "Automatic / Rep Your City" Released: May 14, 2002

Professional ratings
Review scores
Source	Rating
AllMusic	4/5 stars
HipHopDX	4/5
RapReviews	8.5/10
The Source	3.5/5 stars
Vibe	4/5 stars

Grit & Grind is the seventh studio album by American rapper E-40. It was released on July 9, 2002, by Sick Wid It Records and Jive Records. Production was handled by Rick Rock, Tone Capone, Afroman, B. Bumble, Bosko, Lil' Jon, Michael "Mike D" Dinkins, Mike Mosley, Sam Bostic, Smash and Steve Vicious. It features guest appearances from 8Ball, Afroman, B-Legit, Bosko, Bun B, Fabolous, Harm, James "Stomp Down" Bailey, Keak da Sneak, Kokane, Lil' Jon & The Eastside Boyz, Petey Pablo, Suga Free and Suga-T.

The album peaked at number 13 on the Billboard 200 and number 5 on the Top R&B/Hip-Hop Albums charts in the United States. It was supported with two singles: "Automatic" and "Rep Yo City", which peaked on the Hot R&B/Hip-Hop Songs charts at No. 72 and No. 73, respectively.

== Track listing ==
No.	Title	Writer(s)	Producer(s)	Length
1.	"Why They Don't Fuck Wit Us"	Earl Stevens; Ricardo Thomas; Dulon Stevens	Rick Rock	4:06
2.	"The Slap"	E. Stevens; Thomas; Tenina Stevens; Kevin Davis	Rick Rock	4:03
3.	"Automatic" (featuring Fabolous)	E. Stevens; John Jackson; Thomas; Harold E. Davis; Donald Fletcher; Weldon Dean Parks; Kenneth Gamble	Rick Rock	4:42
4.	"Rep Yo' City" (featuring Petey Pablo, Bun B, 8Ball, Lil' Jon & The Eastside Boyz)	E. Stevens; Moses Barrett III; Bernard James Freeman; Premro Smith; Jonathan Smith; Robert McDowell; Omar Helton	Lil' Jon	5:13
5.	"It's All Gravity"	E. Stevens; Thomas; Timmy Gibson; J. Gibson	Rick Rock	4:20
6.	"7 Much" (featuring Kokane)	E. Stevens; Jerry Long; Mike Mosley; Samuel Ramone Bostic; T. Stevens	Mike Mosley; Sam Bostic	3:27
7.	"Mustard & Mayonnaise" (Intro)	E. Stevens; Anthony Payne		0:58
8.	"Mustard & Mayonnaise"	E. Stevens; Payne	Smash	3:47
9.	"My Cup" (featuring Suga-T)	E. Stevens; T. Stevens; B. Branch; Michael Dinkins; Sonny Sowles	B Bumble; Mike D	3:46
10.	"Whomp Whomp" (featuring Keak da Sneak & Harm)	E. Stevens; Charles Williams; Rodney Waller; Anthony Douglas Gilmour	Tone Capone	3:51
11.	"Lifestyles"	E. Stevens; Steve Vicious	Steve Vicious	3:58
12.	"'Til the Dawn" (featuring Suga Free & Bosko)	E. Stevens; Bosko Kante; Ray Cham	Bosko	4:38
13.	"End of the World"	E. Stevens; Thomas	Rick Rock	4:47
14.	"It's a Man's Game"	E. Stevens; Thomas	Rick Rock	3:41
15.	"Pimps, Hustlas (Intro)" (featuring James "Stomp Down" Bailey)	E. Stevens; Gilmour; Louis King		1:06
16.	"Pimps, Hustlas"	E. Stevens; Gilmour; King	Tone Capone	4:00
17.	"Fallin' Rain"	E. Stevens; Thomas; Terrance Harrison; William Marvin Smith	Rick Rock	3:47
18.	"Roll On" (featuring Afroman & B-Legit)	E. Stevens; Joseph Foreman; Brandt Jones	Afroman	5:34
Total length:				1:09:44

== Charts ==
Chart (2002)	Peak position
US Billboard 200	13
US Top R&B/Hip-Hop Albums (Billboard)	5
