= Coast 2 Coast (B-Legit album) =

Mixtape by B-Legit
- Released: August 14, 2007
- Genre: Hip hop, West Coast hip hop
- Length: 53:43
- Label: Oarfin Records

B-Legit chronology
Block Movement (2005)	Coast 2 Coast (2007)	Throwblock Muzic (2007)

Coast 2 Coast is a mixtape released by American rapper B-Legit released off of Oarfin Records released on August 14, 2007.

== Track listing ==
1. "Intro" - :22
2. "Get That Money" - 3:52
3. "How We Ball" - 4:07
4. "Big Paper Chase" - 3:55
5. "My Gunz" - 3:12
6. "Skit" - :26
7. "Enemies" - :53
8. "Street" - 2:39
9. "Back When" - 3:25
10. "Skit" - 4:31
11. "Trap Stars" - 5:25
12. "Skit" - :29
13. "Fu'k Ya'll" - 3:31
14. "Lucky" 4:01
15. "I Get Gorilla Wit IT" 4:01
