= All Frames of the Game =

Studio album by Playaz Tryna Strive
- Released: November 12, 1996
- Genre: West Coast hip hop; gangsta rap
- Length: 1:04:08
- Label: Sick Wid' It; Jive
- Producer: B-Legit (exec.); E-40 (exec.); Filthy Rich; K-Lou; Mike D; Studio Ton; Wayniac

Singles from All Frames of the Game
- 1. "They Say Y.D.L.L." / "Feel Ness Real" Released: 1996

Professional ratings
Review scores
Source	Rating
AllMusic	2.5/5 stars

All Frames of the Game is the only studio album by American rap duo Playaz Tryna Strive. It was released November 12, 1996, via Sick Wid' It/Jive Records. Production was handled by member Filthy Rich, K-Lou, Michael "Mike D" Dinkins, Wayniac and Studio Ton, with B-Legit and E-40 serving as executive producers. It features guest appearances from B-Legit, E-40, Levitti and Suga-T.

The album did not reach the US Billboard 200, however, it peaked at number 100 on the Top R&B/Hip-Hop Albums charts. Along with a single, a music video was released for the song "They Say Y.D.L.L." (Youngsta's Don't Live Long). The song "Feel Ness Real" was originally released on the 1995 Sick Wid' It Records compilation album The Hogg in Me.

== Track listing ==
No.	Title	Producer(s)	Length
1.	"Dime a Dozen" (featuring E-40)	Wayniac	4:01
2.	"Feel Ness Real (Radio)"	Mike D	4:45
3.	"Throw up the Dubb"	Mike D	4:00
4.	"Big Pimpin' (Interlude)"		1:07
5.	"Alkahal & Dozanique"	Filthy Rich	4:55
6.	"Haterism" (featuring B-Legit)	K-Lou	4:53
7.	"W. C. Playaz"	Filthy Rich	4:03
8.	"Money Hungry (Interlude)"		0:30
9.	"They Say Y.D.L.L."	Filthy Rich	4:52
10.	"9 Sexual (Interlude)"	K-Lou	1:07
11.	"Let's Ride"	Filthy Rich; K-Lou (co.); Mike D (co.)	4:09
12.	"Land of Fonk"	Filthy Rich	4:05
13.	"Feel Ness Real (Interlude)"	Studio Ton	0:39
14.	"Hoe Shit"	Filthy Rich	3:55
15.	"All Frames of the Game"	Filthy Rich	4:20
16.	"Shady" (featuring Suga-T)	Filthy Rich	4:03
17.	"E.S.P."	Filthy Rich	4:55
18.	"Feel Ness Real (Street)"	Filthy Rich	3:49
Total length:			1:04:08

== Personnel ==
- Richard "Filthy Rich" Harris – vocals, keyboards, drum programming, producer
- Thomas "T-Pup" Hudson – vocals
- Earl "E-40" Stevens – vocals, executive producer
- Erica "Silk-E" Reynolds – vocals
- Kevin "Kaveo" Davis – voice
- Lewis "Levitti" King – vocals
- Brandt "B-Legit" Jones – vocals, executive producer
- ANS – vocals
- Poppy – vocals
- Michael "Mike D" Dinkins – backing vocals, keyboards, drum programming, producer
- Tenina "Suga-T" Stevens – vocals
- Erick "Eklipze" Carson – vocals
- Dewayne "Wayniac" Williams – keyboards, drum programming, producer
- Ken "K-Lou" Franklin – keyboards, guitar, drum programming, producer, engineering, mixing
- Ruzell Simpson – guitar
- Marvin "Studio Ton" Whitemon – producer
- John "Indo" Neilson – engineering, mixing
- Tom Coyne – mastering
- Keba Konte – photography
- Phunky Phat Graph-X – art direction, design

== Charts ==
Chart (1996)	Peak position
US Top R&B/Hip-Hop Albums (Billboard)	100
