= Block Movement =

Studio album by B-Legit
- Released: August 23, 2005
- Genre: Hip-hop
- Length: 59:57
- Label: SMC Recordings
- Producer: Bedrock; Damon Todd; Goldfingers; Lionel "LJ" Holoman; Mall; One Drop Scott; Rick Rock; Swamp Kat

B-Legit chronology
Hard 2 B-Legit (2002)	Block Movement (2005)	Throwblock Muzic (2007)

Professional ratings
Review scores
Source	Rating
RapReviews	6.5/10

Block Movement is the fifth solo studio album by American rapper B-Legit. It was released on August 23, 2005 via SMC Recordings. It features guest appearances from Clyde Carson, E-40, Harm, Jadakiss, Keak da Sneak, Paul Wall and Styles P. The album peaked at number 91 on the Top R&B/Hip-Hop Albums and number 33 on the Independent Albums charts in the United States.

== Track listing ==
No.	Title	Length
1.	"Knock His Ass Out"	3:03
2.	"Trap Game"	2:51
3.	"Sick Wid It"	3:40
4.	"Dem Boyz"	4:05
5.	"Block 4 Life" (featuring Jadakiss, Styles P and Clyde Carson)	3:50
6.	"Round My Way"	3:43
7.	"Guess Who's Back" (featuring E-40)	3:57
8.	"Handle Up"	3:26
9.	"Kick It 2 Nite"	4:02
10.	"Where Dem Hoes At" (featuring Paul Wall)	3:24
11.	"Get High" (featuring Keak da Sneak and Harm)	4:31
12.	"Friendz"	3:45
13.	"Kill Somebody"	3:23
14.	"Shady"	3:41
15.	"Wanna Know Your Name"	4:23
16.	"Sewed Up"	4:13
Total length:		59:57

== Charts ==
Chart (2005)	Peak position
US Top R&B/Hip-Hop Albums (Billboard)	91
US Independent Albums (Billboard)	33
