= My Ghetto Report Card =

Studio album by E-40
- Released: March 14, 2006
- Recorded: 2005–06
- Genre: Hip hop
- Length: 74:45
- Labels: Sick Wid It; BME; Reprise
- Producers: E-40; Lil Jon; Rick Rock; Droop-E; Bosko; Studio Ton

E-40 chronology
Breakin' News (2003)	My Ghetto Report Card (2006)	The Ball Street Journal (2008)

Singles from My Ghetto Report Card
- 1. "Tell Me When to Go" Released: February 1, 2006; 2. "U and Dat" Released: May 2, 2006

My Ghetto Report Card is the ninth studio album by American rapper E-40. It was released on March 14, 2006, by E-40's Sick Wid It Records, Lil Jon's BME Recordings and Reprise Records. The album was supported by two singles: "Tell Me When to Go" featuring Keak Da Sneak, and "U and Dat" featuring T-Pain and Kandi Girl.

== Background ==
E-40, a rapper born in Vallejo, California, released eight solo albums prior to My Ghetto Report Card dating back to 1993. In the early 1990s, he was part of the Vallejo rap group The Click. Thanks to regional popularity of his independently released single "Captain Save a Hoe", E-40 got his first major label signing with Jive Records in 1994. By the late 1990s and early 2000s, E-40 began doing guest features on Southern rappers' albums, such as MP da Last Don by Master P, My Homies by Scarface, and Kings of Crunk by Lil Jon and the East Side Boyz.

== Recording ==
With E-40 as executive producer, the album features production from Bosko, Lil Jon, and Rick Rock among others. Critics noted the influence of Southern crunk sound. For AllMusic, David Jeffries remarked: "Lil Jon seems to be adapting to the Bay more than E-40 is going South." Ryan Dombal of Entertainment Weekly said the album "speeds up crunk's creeping scurrilousness while toning down its violent undercurrents."

In an interview with MTV News, E-40 described the title as a reflection of having "straight A's across the board" and "d[oing] nothing foul in the game" in his music career.

The Guardian music critic Angus Batey described opening track "Yay Area" as "one of the handful of truly experimental, daring and generally aurally flabbergasting rap tracks released so far this century" in a 2015 profile of E-40.

== Commercial performance ==
Released in the United States by Reprise Records on March 14, 2006, My Ghetto Report Card debuted at no. 3 on the Billboard 200 and remains E-40's highest charting album, surpassing the 1996 album Tha Hall of Game that peaked at no. 4.

On August 25, 2006, the Recording Industry Association of America (RIAA) awarded the album a Gold certification for selling 500,000 units, making it the fourth E-40 album to earn RIAA certification.

Two songs from My Ghetto Report Card were released as singles, starting with "Tell Me When To Go" featuring fellow Bay Area rapper Keak da Sneak. Released on February 1, 2006, "Tell Me When to Go" peaked at no. 35 on the Billboard Hot 100 on April 1, 2006, no. 37 on the Hot R&B/Hip-Hop Songs chart on April 8, and no. 8 on the Hot Rap Songs chart on March 25. "U and Dat" featuring T-Pain and Kandi Burruss (credited as "Kandi Girl") was the second single off this album, released on May 2, 2006. It was more successful than "Tell Me When to Go", as it charted for 25 weeks on the Hot 100 and peaked at no. 13 on August 26, 2006, in addition to peaking at no. 8 on Hot R&B/Hip-Hop Songs on September 2 and no. 4 on Hot Rap Songs on August 26.

== Critical reception ==
Professional ratings
Review scores
Source	Rating
AllMusic	3.5/5 stars
Robert Christgau	(3-star Honorable Mention)
Entertainment Weekly	B+
The Guardian	4/5 stars
HipHopDX	4/5 stars
Okayplayer	4/5 stars
Pitchfork	(5.6/10)
RapReviews	(7/10)
Rolling Stone	3.5/5 stars
USA Today	3.5/4 stars

My Ghetto Report Card received favorable reviews. David Jeffries of AllMusic described the album as containing "an amazing set of wry, snide, and provocative rhymes." Angus Batey of British newspaper The Guardian described the album as "character-filled, lewd and often laugh-out-loud funny."

In a largely negative review, Tom Breihan of Pitchfork called the production of Lil Jon and Rick Rock "more exhausting than exhilarating." Breihan compared the sound of "Yay Area" to "robots malfunctioning" due to "frantic off-kilter drums, high-pitched synth squeals, [and] gurgling staccato vocal samples." Breihan also likened E-40's vocal quality to "Bernie Mac's making-fun-of-white-people voice—a nervous adenoidal yammer."

== Impact ==
Due to the success of "Tell Me When to Go" and hyphy-themed songs on radio and MTV, the East Bay Express and Oakland Tribune speculated that My Ghetto Report Card would become E-40's mainstream breakout album. By May 2006, Jim Harrington of the Oakland Tribune observed that a concert sponsored by local radio station Wild 94.9 "crowned E-40 as the new king of hip-hop." Writing for the Oakland-based East Bay Express, Rachel Swan listed the album among the best of 2006 and called it "the most elegant in a spate of hyphy albums released this year."

== Track listing ==
No.	Title	Writer(s)	Producer(s)	Length
1.	"Yay Area"	Earl Stevens; Ricardo Thomas; Ishmael Butler; Thomas Jackson; Mary Ann Vieira	Rick Rock	3:48
2.	"Tell Me When to Go" (featuring Keak da Sneak)	Stevens; Charles Williams; Jonathan Smith; Darryl McDaniels; Russell Simmons; Joseph Simmons	Lil Jon	4:01
3.	"Muscle Cars" (featuring Keak da Sneak and Turf Talk)	Demar Bernstein; Smith; Stevens; Williams	Lil Jon	4:02
4.	"Go Hard or Go Home" (featuring The Federation)	Anthony Caldwell; Jackson; Marvin Selmon; Stevens; Thomas	Rick Rock	3:53
5.	"Gouda" (featuring B-Legit and Stressmatic)	Jackson; Brandt Jones; Stevens; Thomas	Rick Rock	5:03
6.	"Sick wid It II" (featuring Turf Talk)	Bernstein; Stevens; Earl Stevens, Jr.	Droop-E	3:28
7.	"JB Stomp Down (skit)"			0:19
8.	"They Might Be Taping"	Stevens; Thomas	Rick Rock	3:55
9.	"Do Ya Head Like This"	Stevens; Thomas	Rick Rock	4:45
10.	"Block Boi" (featuring Miko and Stressmatic)	Jackson; Stevens; Marvin Whitemon; Miko Your	Studio Ton	3:46
11.	"White Gurl" (featuring UGK and Juelz Santana)	Chad Butler; Gary Cooper; Bernard Freeman; LaRon James; Joseph Malloy; Rudy Sheriff; Smith; Stevens; William Stroman	Lil Jon	4:23
12.	"GetTheFuckOn.com Pt. 1 (skit)"			1:16
13.	"U and Dat" (featuring T-Pain and Kandi Girl)	Alphonzo Bailey; Kandi "Kandi Girl" Burruss; Faheem Najm; Smith; Stevens	Lil Jon	3:22
14.	"I'm Da Man" (featuring Mike Jones and Al Kapone)	Bailey; LaMarquis Jefferson; Micheal Jones; Craig Love; Smith; Stevens	Lil Jon	4:07
15.	"Yee" (featuring Too $hort and Budda)	Brandon Medlock; Todd Shaw; Smith; Stevens	Lil Jon	4:33
16.	"GetTheFuckOn.com Pt. 2 (skit)"			1:05
17.	"Just Fuckin'" (featuring Bosko)	Stevens; Bosko Kante	Bosko	4:15
18.	"Gimme Head" (featuring Al Kapone and Bosko)	Bailey; Kante; Love; James Phillips; Smith; Stevens	Lil Jon	6:01
19.	"She Say She Loves Me" (featuring 8Ball and Bun B)	Butler; George Clinton; William Collins; Cooper; Freeman; Jefferson; Love; Garry Shider; Smith; Premro "8Ball" Smith; Stevens	Lil Jon	5:18
20.	"Happy to Be Here" (featuring D.D. Artis)	Kante; Stevens; D.D. Artis	Bosko	3:29

Sample credits

- "Yay Area" contains a sample of "Rebirth of Slick (Cool Like Dat)" as performed by Digable Planets.
- "Tell Me When to Go" contains a sample of "Dumb Girl" as performed by Run-DMC.
- "White Gurl" contains a sample of "A Fly Girl" as performed by Boogie Boys.
- "She Say She Loves Me" contains a sample of "Diamonds & Wood" as performed by UGK.

== Charts ==
=== Weekly charts ===
Chart (2006)	Peak position
US Billboard 200	3
US Top R&B/Hip-Hop Albums (Billboard)	1
US Top Rap Albums (Billboard)	1

=== Year-end charts ===
Chart (2006)	Position
US Billboard 200	141
US Top R&B/Hip-Hop Albums (Billboard)	45

== Certifications ==
Region	Certification	Certified units/sales
United States (RIAA)	Platinum	1,000,000^{‡}
^{‡} Sales+streaming figures based on certification alone.
