= Droop-E =

American rapper (born 1988)

- Also known as: Lil E
- Born: Earl Tywone Stevens Jr. February 18, 1988 (age 38); Vallejo, California, U.S.
- Genres: Hip hop; hyphy
- Occupations: Rapper; record producer
- Instrument: Vocals
- Years active: 1993–present
- Labels: Heavy On the Grind; Sick Wid It

Earl Tywone Stevens Jr. (born February 18, 1988), better known by his stage name Droop-E, is an American rapper and record producer. He is the son of the Bay Area rapper E-40.

== Biography ==
Droop-E was born Earl Tywone Stevens Jr. on February 18, 1988, in Vallejo, California. His father is Earl Stevens Sr., a rapper performing as E-40; other rappers in Earl Jr.'s family include cousins B-Legit and Turf Talk, uncle D-Shot, and aunt Suga-T. His first record appearance came at age 3 when he was featured in "Questions" on E-40's Federal album. He also rapped on the track "It's All Bad" from E-40's 1995 album In a Major Way (credited as Lil E), mimicking his father's style. His production debut was at the age of 15 for the Turf Talk song "In The Heart Of The Ghetto" on Mack 10's 2003 compilation, Ghetto, Gutter & Gangster.

== Singles ==
- "Super Sic Wit It" – Mistah F.A.B. (Feat. E-40 & Turf Talk)
- "Get On My Hype" – Messy Marv
- "Out Here" – Droop-E & B-Slimm (Feat. Mistah F.A.B.)
- "Don't Let The Glasses Fool Ya" – B-Slimm
- "3 Freaks (Droop-E Remix)" – DJ Shadow
- "Go Ignant" – The Mossie (Feat. E-40)
- "Nice Girl (Remix)" – Droop-E (Feat. E-40)
- "Bay" – Nelly

== Discography ==
=== Studio albums ===
- 2017: Trillionaire Thoughts
- 2019: Droopiter
- 2026: Easy Listening (Volume 1)
- 2026: Easy Listening (Volume 2)
- 2026: Easy Listening (The Collection)
- 2026: Everlasting
- 2026: Ethereal
- 2026: Eutopia

=== EPs ===
- 2010: BLVCK Diamond Life
- 2013: Hungry And Humble

=== Collaborations ===
- 2006: Droop-E & B-Slimm – The Fedi Fetcher & The Money Stretcher
- 2010: Droop-E & Southern Hospitality - The Bay Genius (Volume 1)
- 2016: Droop-E & Nite Jewel (AMTHST) - Euphoria EP
- 2019: Droop-E & Rich Rocka aka Ya Boy - Age Of Aquarius: Information Age EP
- 2019: Droop-E & Cousin Fik - Another Level
- 2021: Droop-E & Stresmatic - 4005
- 2022: Droop-E & Stresmatic - 4005 Episode II: Matic's Memory Bank
- 2023: Droop-E & Mistah F.A.B. - The Hyphy Era
- 2023: Droop-E & Stresmatic - 4005: Data File 7O751O832
- 2023: Droop-E & Stresmatic - Lovesong EP

=== Guest appearances ===
- 2016: Track 7. "Sick Out Here" (with E-40) on The D-Boy Diary: Book 2

=== Singles ===
- E-40 & Too Short ft. Wiz Khalifa – Say I – History: Function Music (2012)
- E-40 & Too Short – We Are Pioneers – History: Mob Music (2012)
- E-40 & Too Short – Whip Out – History: Mob Music (2012)
- E-40 & Too Short – Ride With Me – History: Mob Music (2012)
- E-40 – Fast Lane – "The Block Brochure: Welcome to the Soil 1" (2012)
- E-40 ft. Gangsta Boo – Let's – "The Block Brochure: Welcome to the Soil 1" (2012)
- E-40 ft. Big Omeezy – Bust Moves – "The Block Brochure: Welcome to the Soil 1" (2012)
- E-40 ft. B-Legit – Can You Feel It? – "The Block Brochure: Welcome to the Soil 1" (2012)
- E-40 ft. J Banks – What Is It Over? – "The Block Brochure: Welcome to the Soil 1" (2012)
- E-40 ft. Raheem DeVaughn, Laroo T.H.H., Mugzi, Work Dirty, & Decadez – Rollin' – "The Block Brochure: Welcome to the Soil 1" (2012)
- E-40 ft. JT the Bigga Figga & Cellski – With The – "The Block Brochure: Welcome to the Soil 2" (2012)
- E-40 – This Hard – "The Block Brochure: Welcome to the Soil 2" (2012)
- E-40 ft. Andre Nickatina – Memory Lane – "The Block Brochure: Welcome to the Soil 2" (2012)
- E-40 ft. Kendrick Lamar- Catch a Fade – "The Block Brochure: Welcome to the Soil 3" (2012)
- E-40 ft. Kaveo- It's Curtains – "The Block Brochure: Welcome to the Soil 3" (2012)
- E-40 ft. Cousin Fik- Get Loose – "The Block Brochure: Welcome to the Soil 3" (2012)
- E-40 – Sidewalk Memorial – "The Block Brochure: Welcome to the Soil 3" (2012)
- E-40 ft. Too Short- Over Here—The Block Brochure: Welcome to the Soil 3" [bonus track] (2012)
- E-40 – Mr. Flamboyant 2K11 --"Revenue Retrievin': Overtime Shift" (2011)
- E-40 ft Decadez – Stay Gone – "Revenue Retrievin': Overtime Shift" (2011)
- E-40 – Tired of Selling Yola "Revenue Retrievin': Overtime Shift" (2011)
- E-40 – I Am Your "Revenue Retrievin': Overtime Shift" (2011)
- E-40 – Barbarian "Revenue Retrievin': Graveyard Shift" (2011)
- E-40 ft. Turf Talk, Cousin Fik & Stressmatic – Back & Forth "Revenue Retrievin': Graveyard Shift" (2011)
- E-40 – Bad Bitch "Revenue Retrievin': Graveyard Shift" (2011)
- E-40 – Takin' Em Back "Revenue Retrievin': Graveyard Shift" (2011)
- E-40 – Back in Business "Revenue Retrievin': Day Shift" (2010)
- E-40 – Understandz Me "Revenue Retrievin': Day Shift" (2010)
- E-40 – The Art of Story Tellin' "Revenue Retrievin': Day Shift" (2010)
- E-40 – Got It "Revenue Retrievin': Day Shift" (2010)
- E-40 – Outta Control ft. Dem Hoodstarz & Mistah F.A.B. "Revenue Retrievin': Day Shift" (2010)
- E-40 – Ya Suppose To "Revenue Retrievin': Day Shift" (2010)
- E-40 – Show Me What U Workin' With ft. Too $hort "Revenue Retrievin': Night Shift" (2010)
- E-40 – How I'm Feeling Right Now "Revenue Retrievin': Night Shift" (2010)
- E-40 – He's a Gangsta ft. Messy Marv & The Jacka "Revenue Retrievin': Night Shift" (2010)
- E-40 – Spend The Night ft. Droop-E, The DB'z, Laroo, and B-Slimm "Revenue Retrievin': Night Shift" (2010)
- E-40 – Trained To Go ft. Laroo, The DB'z & Mac Shawn 100 "Revenue Retrievin': Night Shift" (2010)
- E-40 – Ahhhh Sh*t! "Revenue Retrievin': Night Shift" (2010)
- E-40 – Power Up ft. San Quinn & Keak da Sneak "Revenue Retrievin': Night Shift" (2010)
- E-40 – Attention ft. Dru Down, Suga Free & Stompdown "Revenue Retrievin': Night Shift" (2010)
- E-40 – Let Go & Let God ft. Lenny Williams "Revenue Retrievin': Night Shift" (2010)
- E-40 – Streets Keep Callin' Me ft. Krizz Kaliko & B-Slimm "Revenue Retrievin': Night Shift" (2010)
- E-40 – Move Mean ft. J-Diggs & Big Rich "Revenue Retrievin'": Night Shift" (2010)
- Nelly – Bay – "Brass Knuckles"[Universal Records] (2008)
- E-40 – Poor Mans Hydraulics – "The Ball Street Journal" (2008) [Warner]
- E-40 – Got Rich Twice – "The Ball Street Journal" (2008)[Warner]
- E-40 – I Can Sell It – "The Ball Street Journal" (2008)[Warner]
- The Umbrella – Can't Slow Down – "Sick Wid It Machine"(4/15/2008)[Sick Wid It Records/Koch]
- The Umbrella – Money Aint Trippin- "Sick Wid It Machine"(4/15/2008)[Sick Wid It Records/Koch]
- The Umbrella – My Whoofers – "Sick Wid It Machine"(4/15/2008)[Sick Wid It Records/Koch]
- The Umbrella – Kush Burn – "Sick Wid It Machine"(4/15/2008)[Sick Wid It Records/Koch]
- The Umbrella – Hold Yo Stack Up – "Sick Wid It Machine"(4/15/2008)[Sick Wid It Records/Koch]
- The Umbrella – Showin Out – "Sick Wid It Machine"(4/15/2008)[Sick Wid It Records/Koch]
- The Umbrella – Yay Up – "Sick Wid It Machine"(4/15/2008)[Sick Wid It Records/Koch]
- The Umbrella – I Do Me – "Sick Wid It Machine"(2008)[Sick Wid It Records/Koch]
- The Umbrella – Where My Neighborhood – "Sick Wid It Machine"(4/15/2008)[Sick Wid It Records/Koch]
- The Umbrella – How I Live – "Sick Wid It Machine"(4/15/2008)[Sick Wid It Records/Koch]
- The Umbrella – Real Talk – "Sick Wid It Machine"(4/15/2008)[Sick Wid It Records/Koch]
- The Umbrella – It's All About The Money – "Sick Wid It Machine"(4/15/2008)[Sick Wid It Records/Koch]
- E-40 – Pharmaceuticals Outro "Breakin' News" (7/1/2003) [Jive Records]
- E-40 ft. Turf Talk- Sick Wid It II "My Ghetto Report Card" (3/14/2006) [Warner Bros. Records]
- YukMouth – East Oakland – "Million Dollar Mouthpiece" (2008) [Rap-A-Lot]
- Too $hort ft. E-40, Dolla Will and Mistah F.A.B. – I Want Your Girl-- "Up All Night" (8/29/2006) [Jive Records]
- DJ Shadow ft. Keak Da Sneak, Mistah F.A.B. Turf Talk, Droop-E – 4 freaks (3 freaks Remix)--"The Outsider" (9/19/2006) [Universal]
- MTV My Block The Bay Show Scoring (3/5/2006) [MTV]
- Turf Talk ft. E-40 and B-Legit - Doe Boy – "West Coast Vaccine"(June/5/2007) [Sick Wid It Records]
- Turf Talk - Broke N*ggas – "West Coast Vaccine"(June/5/2007) [Sick Wid It Records]
- Turf Talk ft. E-40 - Popo's – "West Coast Vaccine"(June/5/2007) [Sick Wid It Records]
- Turf Talk ft. E-40 - Stop Sitchin' – "West Coast Vaccine"(June/5/2007) [Sick Wid It Records]
- Turf Talk ft. Freeway - Minnie Minnie – "West Coast Vaccine"(June/5/2007) [Sick Wid It Records]
- Turf Talk – Sav Out - "The Street Novelist" (9/14/2004) [Sick Wid It Records]
- Turf Talk – Do The Robot - "The Street Novelist" (9/14/2004) [Sick Wid It Records]
- Turf Talk – In The Heart of The Ghetto- "The Street Novelist" (9/14/2004) [Sick Wid It Records]
- Turf Talk ft. E-40 and Mike Marshall - Celebrate- "The Street Novelist" (9/14/2004) [Sick Wid It Records]
- Turf Talk – Turf Talk Iz Back - "Turf Talk Brings The Hood" (3/29/2005) [Sick Wid It Records]
- Turf Talk – Real Hood-- "Turf Talk Brings The Hood" (3/29/2005) [Sick Wid It Records]
- Turf Talk – Gangsta Shit-- "Murder Dog Celebrates 10 years" (11/16/2004)
- Mistah F.A.B. ft. Turf Talk & E-40 – Super Sic Wit It-- "Son of A Pimp" (5/17/2005) [City Hall]
- Ya Boy feat. E-40 and Turf Talk – We So Cold- "Rookie of the Year" (8/23/2005) [Done Deal Ent.]
- Ya Boy feat. Clyde Carson- Fly As This- "Rookie of the year" (8/23/2005) [Done Deal Ent.]
- Ya Boy – Not For Free-- "Rookie of the year" (8/23/2005) [Done Deal Ent.]
- PSD, Messy Marv, Keak Da Sneak—Cus, Cus-- "Da Bidness" (2/13/2007) [SMC/Universal]
- PSD, Messy Marv, Keak Da Sneak—Gumbo Pot-- "Da Bidness" (2/13/2007) [SMC/Universal]
- PSD, Messy Marv, Keak Da Sneak—Fakin' It Ain't Cool-- "Da Bidness" (2/13/2007) [SMC/Universal]
- PSD, Messy Marv, Keak Da Sneak—Burdens of His Youth-- "Da Bidness" (2/13/2007) [SMC/Universal]
- PSD, Keak Da Sneak, & Mistah F.A.B. – Show Me The Deer Foot-- "Da Bidness" (2/13/2007) [SMC/Universal]
- PSD, Keak Da Sneak, & Mistah F.A.B. – Show Me The Deer Foot-- "The Bay Bridges Compilation" (9/13/2005) [Sick Wid It Records]
- The Mossie, E-40,Turf Talk, & The Federation – Go Ignat- "The Bay Bridges Compilation" (9/13/2005) [Sick Wid It Records]
- Sky Balla – Young Rich Kid-- "The Bay Bridges Compilation" (9/13/2005) [Sick Wid It Records]
- Dem Hoodstarz, Turf Talk & E-40 – Bull Shit-- "The Bay Bridges Compilation" (9/13/2005) [Sick Wid It Records]
- The Team – Smoke Wit Me-- "The Bay Bridges Compilation" (9/13/2005) [Sick Wid It Records]
- Mac Mall – Slobber- "The Bay Bridges Compilation" (9/13/2005) [Sick Wid It Records]
- The DB'z – Get Busy - "The Bay Bridges Compilation" (9/13/2005) [Sick Wid It Records]
- A2ThaK, Young Dru & Lay Low – Break U Down- "The Bay Bridges Compilation" (9/13/2005) [Sick Wid It Records]
- Bavgate – On The Radio- "The Bay Bridges Compilation" (9/13/2005) [Sick Wid It Records]
- Big Rich ft. Ya Boy- Meet The Dealers- "The Bay Bridges Compilation" (9/13/2005) [Sick Wid It Records]
- Money Gang – Back In Effect- "The Bay Bridges Compilation" (9/13/2005) [Sick Wid It Records]
- Mac Shawn, Little Bruce, Turf Talk & J-Minix – Bay Business- "The Bay Bridges Compilation" (9/13/2005) [Sick Wid It Records]
- The Factorz – In My Hood- "The Bay Bridges Compilation" (9/13/2005) [Sick Wid [Sick Wid It Records]It Records]
- The DB'z ft. E-40 – No Trouble- "The Bay Bridges Compilation" (9/13/2005) [Sick Wid It Records]
- The Federation ft. Rick Rock and Laroo – Skirt On-- "Laroo and Doonie Purple Comp.." (11/15/2005) [Timeless Ent.]
- Messy Marv – Can't Nobody-- "DisoBAYish" (3/09/2004) [SMC/Universal]
- Messy Marv – Get On My Hype-- "Bandannas, Tattoos & Tongue Rings"(1/25/2005) [SMC Universal]
- The Mossie ft. Mistah F.A.B. – Throw it up-- "Soil Savy" (2/21/2006) [Sick Wid It Records]
- The Mossie ft. Droop-E, B-Slimm, and Keak Da Sneak - I'm Crazy- "Soil Savy" (2/21/2006) [Sick Wid It Records]
- The Mossie ft. E-40 – Drankin.. and Smokin..- "Soil Savy" (2/21/2006) [Sick Wid It Records]
- The Mossie – Hella Thick- "Soil Savy" (2/21/2006) [Sick Wid It Records]
- The Mossie, E-40, Turf Talk & The Federation – Go Ignat- "Soil Savy" (2/21/2006) [Sick Wid It Records]
- Celly Cel & E-40 – Don't Want None-- "The Sick Wid It Umbrella 'Fedi Fetchin'"(3/29/2005) [Sick Wid It Records]
- The Factors – We Aint Listenin-- "The Sick Wid It Umbrella 'Fedi Fetchin'"(3/29/2005) [Sick Wid It Records]
- The DB..z – Off Safety-- "Speakin' Mannish" (2/21/2006) [Sick Wid It Records]
- The DB..z – ft. Turf Talk Go Hard- "Speakin' Mannish" (2/21/2006) [Sick Wid It Records]
- The DB'z ft. E-40 – Stewy- "Speakin' Mannish" (2/21/2006) [Sick Wid It Records]
- The DB..z ft. Droop-E and B-Slimm – Bloow- "Speakin' Mannish" (2/21/2006) [Sick Wid It Records]
- Big Rich ft. Ya Boy- Meet The Dealers- "Block Tested Hood Approved" (10/3/2006) [Koch]
- Dem Hoodstarz – Bull Bhyt-- "Band-Aide and Scoot" (9/12/2006) [SMC/Universal]
- Dem Hoodstarz – Ugh-- "Band-Aide and Scoot" (9/12/2006) [SMC/Universal]
- Dem Hoodstarz – You Know-- "Band-Aide and Scoot" (9/12/2006) [SMC/Universal]
- J-Diggs ft. E-40, Turf Talk, Little Bruce- Do Sumthin' – "California Livin pt.2" (8/23/2005) [City Hall]
- J Nash ft. Mistah F.A.B., Clyde Carson- "Beat That" (2006) [Fa'eva Afta Ent]
- Killa Keise – "My Block" (2006) [SMC/Universal]
- Mark Price ft. Clyde Carson – "Just Lose it" (2006)
- Mike Marshall ft. E-40 – "Trying To Leave With Something" (2006)
- Blu Chip – Get Retarded (2006)
- Messy Marv – Get On My Hype (Remix) (2006)
- DJ Crook ft. E-40, Keak da Sneak & Turf Talk – Flamboastin.. "Tha Stompilation" (2006)
- Mistah F.A.B. – Metros & Chirpers (2005)
- Vital ft. E-40 & Mac Dre – Let yourself Go (2004) [City Hall]
