= Rick Rock =

- Born: Ricardo Thomas; Montgomery, Alabama, U.S.
- Origin: Fairfield, California, U.S.
- Genres: Hip hop
- Occupations: Record producer; rapper
- Years active: 1990s–present
- Formerly of: Cosmic Slop Shop

Ricardo Thomas, better known by his stage name, Rick Rock, is an American record producer and rapper based in Fairfield, California. He was a founding member of the rap group Cosmic Slop Shop and the Federation with fellow rapper Doonie Baby. He is best known for producing "Change the Game" by Jay-Z.

== Late 1990s ==
Rick Rock began to make a name for himself in 1996 when well known Vallejo Producer Mike Mosley invited him to come to the studio to meet E-40. E-40 had originally planned on using a beat produced by Mike Mosley, however due to Mosley's tardiness, Rick Rock used that time as an opportunity to showcase his talents. He went on to produce two tracks featured on E-40's Tha Hall of Game including the song "Record Haters" a diss track directed to NYC rapper AZ and basketball player Rasheed Wallace. E-40 then introduced Rick Rock to 2pac where he and Mike Mosley co-produced two additional tracks "Tradin War Stories" and "Ain't Hard to Find" from the album All Eyez on Me. Around that time Rick Rock also contributed heavily to fellow bay area artist Spice 1's Immortalized album.

== Early 2000s ==
Rick Rock's popularity grew in the early 2000s after Jay-Z released the hit single "Change the Game". From there, Rick Rock went on to produce "Can't Deny It" for Fabolous, and "I Don't Do Much" by Beanie Sigel. In 2002 Rick Rock reunited with Vallejo producer Mike Mosely and produced the songs "Godzilla" featuring E-40 and Pizzo and "The Sickness" by Federation. Both songs were featured on Mike Mosely's compilation album Major Work The Soundtrack. In Spring of 2002, Rick Rock produced "Automatic" featuring Fabolous, which became the lead single for E-40's album Grit & Grind. In 2003 Rick Rock gained more commercial success working with New York-based artists, producing hits "Make It Clap" for Busta Rhymes, "If I Could Go" for Angie Martinez and "Breathe, Stretch, Shake" for Mase. Following his commercial success, Rick Rock became a sought after producer on the West Coast producing underground tracks like Keak Da Sneak's "T-Shirt, Blue Jeans, & Nike's", "Back it Up" by Ras Kass, "Whip Appeal" by Bambino Brown and producing over half of the songs featured on B-Legit's fourth album Hard 2 B-Legit. In 2003 Rick Rock founded his own label Southwest Federation and signed the Federation featuring fellow Cosmic Slop Shop alumn, Doonie Baby and additional rappers San Diego Native Battle Locco and Harlem native El Dorado Red. El Dorado Red is the only rapper other than the Federation to release an album on Rick Rock's label with the release of East Side Rydah Vol. 1.

== Discography ==
=== Studio albums ===
List of albums, with selected chart positions
Title	Album details	Peak chart positions		
Title	Album details	US	US R&B/HH	US Rap
Rocket	Released: December 4, 2015; Label: Southwest Federation Records; Format: CD, digital download	—	—	—
Rick Rock Beats	Released: March 1, 2019; Label: Southwest Federation Records; Format: CD, digital download	—	—	—
Grind Grind Grind Then Shine / The Forward Movement Project	Released: January 27, 2023; Label: Southwest Federation Records; Format: CD, digital download	—	—	—

== Albums with Rick Rock production ==
- 1996: All Eyez on Me by Tupac Shakur
- 1996: Tha Hall of Game by E-40
- 1996: Untouchable by Mac Mall
- 1996: Seasoned Veteran by Richie Rich
- 1997: Have Heart Have Money by The Mossie
- 1997: Unpredictable by Mystikal
- 1997: The Black Bossalini by Spice 1
- 1998: The Element of Surprise by E-40
- 1998: Fearless by Marvaless
- 1999: Charlie Hustle: The Blueprint Of A Self-Made Millionaire by E40
- 1999: Immortalized by Spice 1
- 2000: Ventilation: Da LP by Phife Dawg
- 2000: The Dynasty: Roc La Familia by Jay-Z
- 2000: Loyalty and Betrayal by E-40
- 2000: Restless by Xzibit
- 2001:: The Professional by DJ Clue
- 2001: The Reason by Beanie Sigel
- 2001: Supernova by Lisa "Left Eye" Lopes
- 2001: Ghetto Fabolous by Fabolous
- 2001: Thug Lord: The New Testament by Yukmouth
- 2001: Money & Muscle by The Click
- 2001: Ghetto by RL
- 2001: Duces 'N Trayz - The Old Fashioned Way by Tha Eastsidaz
- 2002: Blood Brothers by Kastro & E.D.I. of Outlawz
- 2002: State Property by State Property
- 2002: Ghetto Heisman by WC
- 2002: Grit & Grind by E-40
- 2002: Animal House by Angie Martinez
- 2002: Hard 2 B-Legit by B-Legit
- 2002: West Coast Mafia by C-Bo
- 2002: It Ain't Safe No More by Busta Rhymes
- 2002: React by Erick Sermon
- 2002: Born to Reign by Will Smith
- 2002: Man vs. Machine by Xzibit
- 2003: Street Dreams by Fabolous
- 2003: Breakin News by E40
- 2004: Tical 0: The Prequel by Method Man
- 2004: Weapons Of Mass Destruction by Xzibit
- 2004: Welcome Back by Mase
- 2005: Block Movement by B-Legit
- 2005: Cash on Delivery by Ray Cash
- 2005: Institutionalized by Ras Kass
- 2006: Everready (The Religion) by Tech N9ne
- 2006: Tha Blue Carpet Treatment by Snoop Dogg
- 2006:: Full Circle by Xzibit
- 2006: My Ghetto Report Card by E-40
- 2007: Ultimate Victory by Chamillionaire
- 2007: Guilty By Affiliation by WC
- 2007: T.H.U.G.S. by Bone Thugs-n-Harmony
- 2008: Ego Trippin' by Snoop Dogg
- 2008: T.O.S: Terminate on Sight by G-Unit
- 2009: Custom Cars & Cycles by Triple C's
- 2009: Before I Self Destruct by 50 Cent
- 2010: Revenue Retrievin': Night Shift by E-40
- 2011: Doggumentary by Snoop Dogg
- 2012: The Block Brochure: Welcome to the Soil 1 by E-40
- 2012: The Block Brochure: Welcome to the Soil 2 by E-40
- 2012: The Block Brochure: Welcome to the Soil 3 by E-40
- 2012: Napalm by Xzibit
- 2012: History: Function Music by E-40 & Too $hort
- 2012: History: Mob Music by E-40 & Too $hort
- 2013: Demonstration by Tinie Tempah
- 2014: Sharp On All 4 Corners: Corner 1 by E-40
- 2014: Sharp On All 4 Corners: Corner 2 by E-40
- 2015: Mudface by Redman
- 2016: The D-Boy Diary: Book 1 by E-40
- 2016: The D-Boy Diary: Book 2 by E-40
- 2017: Neva Left by Snoop Dogg
- 2017: Trillionaire Thoughts by Droop-E
- 2019: Rick Rock Beats by Rick Rock
- 2019: Madden 20 by Snoop Dogg
- 2019: I Wanna Thank Me by Snoop Dogg
- 2019: Black Man In America by Redman
- 2020: Summer of Sam by Serial Killers
- 2020: Extinction Level Event 2: The Wrath of God by Busta Rhymes
- 2021: Blue Castle by Battle Locco
- 2022: Snoop Cube 40 $hort by Mount Westmore
- 2023: Rule of Thumb: Rule 1 by E-40
- 2024: W.A.W.G. (We All We Got) by Tha Dogg Pound
- 2024: Muddy Waters Too by Redman
