= B-Legit =

American rapper (born 1968)

- Also known as: Hash Brown Billo
- Born: Brandt Jones
- Origin: Vallejo, California, U.S.
- Genres: Hip hop; Hyphy
- Occupation: Rapper
- Years active: 1988–present
- Labels: Jive; Sick Wid It; Koch

Brandt Jones, better known by his stage name B-Legit, is an American rapper from Vallejo, California.

== Career ==
Before he started his music career, he went to Grambling State University. He became a member of The Click, a rap group formed by his cousin E-40. He was featured on the track "Aint Hard 2 Find" on 2Pac's album All Eyez on Me. He has been on several independent and major labels such as Sick Wid It Records, Jive Records, and Koch Records. He has collaborated with numerous other artists including E-40, Celly Cel, Master P, Too Short, Scarface, Snoop Dogg, C-Murder, Bushwick Bill, Jadakiss, Daz Dillinger, Kurupt, Styles P, The Federation, Mystikal, UGK, Mack 10, Daryl Hall, Keak Da Sneak, Rick Rock, Young Buck, Luniz, Paul Wall, and the late Mac Dre. He has three children, and an independent label called Block Movement.

== Discography ==
=== Studio albums ===
- Tryin' To Get A Buck (1993)
- The Hemp Museum (1996)
- Hempin' Ain't Easy (2000)
- Hard 2 B-Legit (2002)
- Block Movement (2005)
- Throwblock Muzic (2007)
- What We Been Doin’ (2015)
- Throwblock Music II: 88' D Boi (2023)
- Hemp Hop, Vol. 1 (2026)

=== Collaboration albums ===
- Down And Dirty with The Click (1992)
- Game Related with The Click (1995)
- Money & Muscle with The Click (2001)
- Connected And Respected with E-40 (2018)
- Put That On The Gooch with Andre Nickatina & CB Fam Bizz (2026)

=== Compilation albums ===
- Southwest Riders with E-40 (1997)
- Abundance with Sick Wid It (2023)

=== Mixtapes ===
- The Purple House President (2005)
- Hood Hustlin' (2006)
- Gorilla Grindin’ with Lil Sisco (2006)
- Coast 2 Coast (2007)

=== Soundtrack appearances ===
Title	Release	Other artist(s)	Soundtrack album
"Hot Ones Echo Thru the Ghetto"	1995	The Click, Levitti	Tales from the Hood
"On the Grind"	1996	The Click, Mike Marshall	Original Gangstas
"Gotta Have Game"	1996	The Click	Phat Beach
"Why You Wanna Funk?"	1996	The Click, Spice 1, Marcus Gore	High School High
"Struggled & Strived"	1997	The Click, Levitti	Dangerous Ground
"Ghetto Smile"	1997	Daryl Hall	Dangerous Ground
"Don't Blame It on Me"	1997	E-40	Booty Call
"Come On"	1997	E-40	I'm Bout It
"The Corruptor's Execution"	1999	UGK, E-40	The Corruptor
"Fuckin' They Nose"	1999	The Click	Charlie Hustle: The Blueprint of a Self-Made Millionaire
"Borrow Yo' Broad"	1999	E-40	Charlie Hustle: The Blueprint of a Self-Made Millionaire
"Captain Save a Hoe"	2013	The Click	Grand Theft Auto V

=== Guest appearances ===
Title	Release	Other performer(s)	Album
"Outsmart the Po Po's"	1992	E-40	Federal
"V-Town"	1992	N2Deep, E-40	Back to the Hotel
"Crooked Cops"	1993	D-Shot, E-40	The Shot Calla
"When the Money Was Flowin'"	1993	D-Shot	The Shot Calla
"Fuck a Ho"	1993	D-Shot	The Shot Calla
"Somethin' I Can't Deny"	1993	RhythmX	Long Overdue
"Bailin' Thru My Hood"	1994	Celly Cel	Heat 4 Yo Azz
"Sideways"	1995	E-40, Mac Shawn	In a Major Way
"H.I. Double L."	1995	E-40, Celly Cel	In a Major Way
"Outro"	1995	E-40	In a Major Way
"Intro"	1995		The Hogg in Me
"Can My Nine Get Ate"	1995	Mac Shawn	The Hogg in Me
"Living Like a Hustler"	1995	C-Bo	The Best of C-Bo
"Dug So Deeply"	1995	Game Related, Levitti	Soak Game
"Ain't Hard 2 Find"	1996	2Pac, E-40, D-Shot, C-Bo, Richie Rich	All Eyez on Me
"Million Dollar Spot"	1996	E-40, 2Pac, Emgee	Tha Hall of Game
"I Like What You Do to Me"	1996	E-40	Tha Hall of Game

- 1996: Suga-T - Paper Chasin’ (4eva Hustlin’)
- 1996: Funk Mobb - It Ain't 4 Play
- 1996: Celly Cel - Killa Kali
- 1996: Playaz Tryna Strive - All Frames of the Game
- 1997: C-Bo - One Life 2 Live
- 1997: Ant Banks - Big Thangs
- 1997: D-Shot - Six Figures
- 1997: The Mossie - Have Heart Have Money
- 1997: Mystikal & E-40 - "Here We Go" (Unpredictable)
- 1997: Luniz - Lunitik Muzik
- 1997: 187 Fac - Fac Not Fiction
- 1998: Scarface - "Do What You Do" (My Homies)
- 1998: Daz Dillinger & Bo–Roc - "Playa Partners" (Retaliation, Revenge & Get Back)
- 1998: D-Shot - Boss Ballin’ 2
- 1998: Celly Cel - The G Filez
- 1998: E-40 - "All the Time" (The Element of Surprise)
- 1998: E-40 - "Doin' Dirt Bad" (The Element of Surprise)
- 1999: Too $hort - Can't Stay Away
- 1999: A-1 - Mash Confusion
- 1999: Mac Dre - "Valley Joe" ("Rapper Gone Bad")
- 1999: The Delinquents - Bosses Will Be Bosses
- 1999: T.W.D.Y. - Derty Werk
- 2000: Richie Rich - The Game
- 2000: Too $hort - You Nasty
- 2000: E-40 - Loyalty and Betrayal
- 2000: T.W.D.Y. - Lead the Way
- 2001: Too $hort - Chase the Cat
- 2002: E-40 - Grit & Grind
- 2002: Too $hort - What's My Favorite Word?
- 2003: E-40 - "Northern Califoonya" (Breakin News)
- 2003: Street Lordz - Platinum Masterpiece
- 2004: Messy Marv - The Block Files
- 2004: Bosko - That Fire
- 2004: E-40 - The Best of E-40: Yesterday, Today, and Tomorrow
- 2006: E-40 & Stressmatic - "Gouda" (My Ghetto Report Card)
- 2007: Turf Talk - West Coast Vaccine: The Cure
- 2007: Woodie, Never, Lil Coner - Pistoleros
- 2007: The Lonely Island - Cool Beans
- 2008: The Jacka & Berner - Drought Season
- 2008: E-40 - "Alcoholism" (The Ball Street Journal)
- 2008: E-40 & Bosko & Suga T - "Pray For Me" (The Ball Street Journal)
- 2009: Big Scoob - Monsterifik
- 2010: Cognito - Automatic
- 2010: Yukmouth - "All On You" (Thuggin' & Mobbin')
- 2010: E-40 - "I Get Down" (Revenue Retrievin': Day Shift)
- 2011: E-40 - "Drugs" (Revenue Retrievin': Overtime Shift)
- 2011: E-40 & Stressmatic - "Rear View Mirror" (Revenue Retrievin': Overtime Shift)
- 2011: E-40 - "43" (Revenue Retrievin': Graveyard Shift)
- 2012: The Chicken Hill Project (Album Produced by Hallway Productionz )
- 2012: E-40 & Laroo T.H.H.- "Outta Town" (The Block Brochure: Welcome to the Soil 1)
- 2012: E-40 & Richie Rich - "Cutlass" (The Block Brochure: Welcome to the Soil 1)
- 2012: E-40 - "Can You Feel It?" (The Block Brochure: Welcome to the Soil 1)
- 2012: E-40 & Willy Will - "I Ain't Doin' Nothin'" (The Block Brochure: Welcome to the Soil 3 )
- 2012: C-Bo - "Getting To The Money" (Orca)
- 2012: DJ Toure - "She Like It" also featuring D-Lo and London (Toure's Theory: Session One)
- 2012: Yukmouth - "Cookies & Bo" (featuring Cellski) (Half Baked)
- 2012: Young Noble - "So Crazy" feat. Z-Ro (Outlaw Rydahz Vol. 1)
- 2012: Blanco & Yukmouth - "Airheads" feat. Dru Down & Richie Rich) (Cookies 'n Cream)
- 2014: Davina - "Rollin in These Streets" ft. Shady Nate & Lil Raider (Menace 2 Society: Northern California Gangsters & Thugs Vol. 4)
- 2014: Big Tone - "Mobb Shit" (feat. Celly Cel) (Sav It Out Vol. 5)
- 2014: Ant Taylor - "We$t Coa$t" (feat. Biggmann, Black C & Lace Leno) (WestCoast Revival Vol. 1)
- 2015: Berner & B-Real - "Mob" (Prohibition Part 2)
- 2015: Bandgang Biggs x Bandgang Javar x B-Legit - "Nobody" (Biggs Campaign)
- 2016: E-40 & Jazze Pha - "Savage" (The D-Boy Diary (Book 1))
- 2016: E-40 & TreSolid - "Highway" (The D-Boy Diary (Book 2))
- 2016: Big Scoob - "Bitch Please" feat. E-40 & B-Legit
- 2020: Afroman - "Thunderfucc" feat. B-Legit and Ron Bass
- 2026: Larry June - "Win or Lose" feat. B-Legit
