= Turf Talk =

American rapper

Turf-Talk
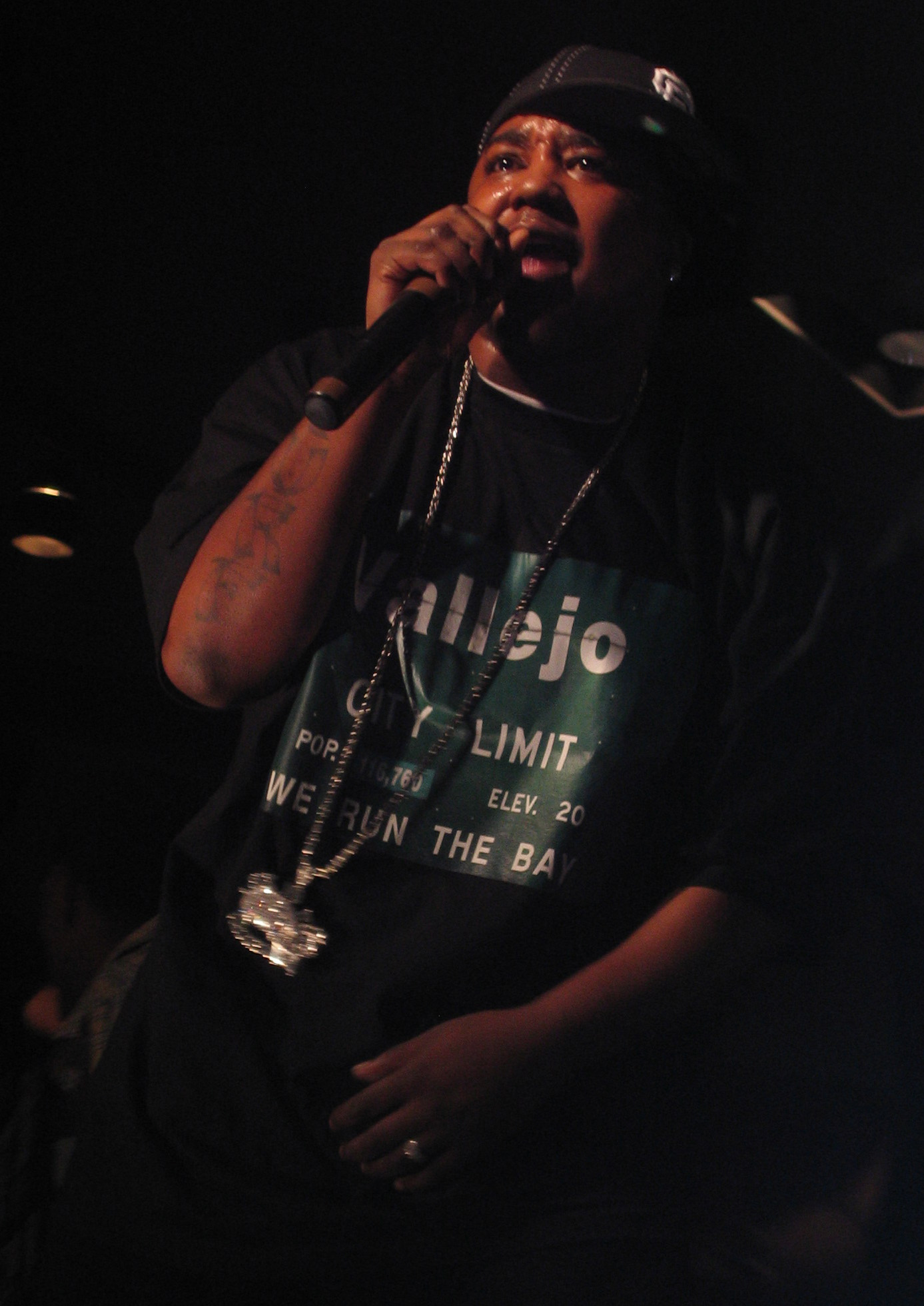
- Turf Talk performing in 2006

Background information
- Born: Demar Bernstine; April 3, 1979 (age 47); Solano County, California
- Origin: Vallejo, California
- Genres: Hyphy; West Coast hip hop
- Occupation: Rapper
- Label: Sick Wid It/Hoodboy Ent
- Website: Turf Talk on Myspace

Demar Bernstine (born April 3, 1979), known professionally as Turf Talk, is an American rapper. He is involved with the hyphy movement. He is a cousin of Bay Area rapper E-40, and is signed to his record label Sick Wid It Records.

== Growing Up ==
Turf Talk told the UK-based rap periodical Hip Hop Connection that he "came from living in hotel rooms... for four to five years". The rapper returned to Vallejo (in the Bay Area) in 1999 to pursue his career under cousin E-40.

Turf Talk quotes his influences as "E-40 and The Click, Too $hort, and then The Dangerous Crew, and Mac Mall."

== Career ==
Originally rapping under the name Killa Kane, Turf Talk would first appear alongside Mac Shawn, another younger cousin of E-40, on the compilation CD Worldwide Bosses & Playas in 2001. His breakthrough came in 2003 performing the hook for the MTV-aired E-40 track "Gasoline", B-side to the single "One Night Stand".

Turf Talk would go on to appear in three tracks on E-40's 2003 album Breakin News as well as cement his growing reputation in the Bay Area's new movement by guesting in style on the official remix to The Federation's seminal hit "Hyphy".

In 2004 Turf Talk released his highly anticipated debut album The Street Novelist featuring his mentor E-40, The Federation and a range of Sick Wid It Records' artists. The CD included the Rick Rock-produced smash "It's Ah Slumper" and one of the final guest appearances of Mac Dre.

In 2005 Turf Talk released Turf Talk Brings The Hood: Colabilation part album, part compilation of tracks recorded with both long-time and up-and-coming Sick Wid It Records collaborators. The CD included the popular local hit "Turf Talk Iz Back".

Turf Talk appeared on a May 2005 episode of the court arbitration show Judge Joe Brown where he was sued by a former female friend for car damages. He lost the case.

In the early hours of July 14, 2005, Turf Talk suffered several shots to the face from a small caliber pellet shotgun, after being apparently targeted leaving a recording studio in Vallejo. He was treated at the Sutter Solano Medical Center and made a quick and full recovery.

On July 30, 2005, at the San Francisco Masonic Center, Turf Talk was announced as New Artist (Rookie) of The Year 2005 in the inaugural Bay Area Rap Scene (B.A.R.S.) Awards. He beat strong competition from both Mistah F.A.B. and Ya Boy.

Boosted by the signing of mentor E-40 to Lil Jon's multi-platinum BME/Warner imprint, Turf Talk announced plans to release his new studio album West Coast Vaccine: The Cure in 2006, featuring almost exclusive production by rap heavyweights Rick Rock and Lil Jon. The CD was delayed to early 2007.

In 2006 Turf Talk secured further exposure by appearing on E-40's BME debut and Billboard 200 success story My Ghetto Report Card as well as MTV's Hyphy music insight My Block: The Bay. His influence on the Hyphy movement was featured in Hip Hop magazines The Source and XXL.

In the summer of 2006 Turf Talk extended his cross-genre, national and international reputation after being invited to feature on the DJ Shadow Hyphy-influenced new release 3 Freaks. This led to an MTV music video alongside Keak Da Sneak, as well as a supporting role in a tour of Europe and Japan.

The tour climaxed with a performance in front of over 25,000 at the Wireless Festival in London's Hyde Park on June 23. Turf Talk appeared alongside Bay Area emcees Mistah F.A.B. and Nump, in a line-up which included Massive Attack, Pharrell, Gnarls Barkley and Damian Marley.

== Style ==
Turf Talk's unusual delivery is an important part of his act. The self-styled "devastating mouthpiece", he combines a distinctive drawl with fierce interjections using multi-track recording. The New York Times said "he has a high, pinched voice, less cartoonish than his cousin (E-40) and more ferocious".

The rapper himself ascribes his fast-changing flow to building a character for his listeners, complete with ad-libs, and to developing a range of marketable styles. "I'm always thinking about new ways to rap on different beats and new sounds, just something different to the human ear."

== Discography ==
=== Albums ===
- 2004: The Street Novelist (Presented by E-40)
- 2005: Turf Talk Brings The Hood Colabilation
- 2007: West Coast Vaccine: The Cure
- TBA: Turf Talk Brings The Hood Colabilation 2

=== Collaboration albums ===
- 2007: Hyphy Ain't Dead (with Mistah F.A.B.)
- 2012: Sick-Wid-It Block Op (with Laroo The Hard Hitta)
- 2014: Fixed Fights (Volume 2) (with I-Rocc)
- 2026: Let The Hood Rejoice (with Work Dirty)

=== Mixtapes ===
- 2007: West Coast Gangsta V.17
- 2010: Return Of The Jedi Mixtape
- 2011: Turf Sinatra Mixtape

=== Guest appearances ===
- 2001: "Worldwide Bossin’ We Be Flossin" (Mac Shawn feat. Turf Talk as Killa Kane)
- 2002: "Boss To Preciseness" (Jay Tee feat. E-40 & Turf Talk)
- 2003: "I Got Dat Work" (E-40 feat. Turf Talk)
- 2003: "Gasoline" (E-40 feat. Turf Talk and Doonie)
- 2003: "In The Heart Of The Ghetto" (Mack 10 feat. Turf Talk)
- 2003: "Hyphy (Remix)" (The Federation feat. Turf Talk)
- 2005: "We So Cold" (Ya Boy feat. E-40 & Turf Talk)
- 2005: "Super Sic Wit It" (Mistah F.A.B. featuring Turf Talk & E-40)
- 2005: "We Beastin'" (Sean T featuring Turf Talk & Mr. Sandman)
- 2006: "Muscle Cars" (E-40 feat. Turf Talk & Keak Da Sneak)
- 2006: "Grown Man (Remix)" (Traxamillion feat. Clyde Carson, Dem Hoodstarz, Mistah F.A.B., San Quinn, & Turf Talk)
- 2006: "3 Freaks" (DJ Shadow feat. Turf Talk & Keak da Sneak)
- 2007: "Mac Dre" (Mac Dre feat. Gangsta Mac, Turf Talk, & Yukmouth)
- 2007: "Thick O' Thangz" (PSD, Keak da Sneak & Messy Marv feat. Mistah F.A.B., Turf Talk, Dubee, & San Quinn)
- 2008: "Street Life" (Spider Loc feat. Turf Talk, Kartoon, & Butch Cassidy)
- 2008: "Got Rich Twice" (E-40 feat. Turf Talk)
- 2008: "Hustle" (E-40 feat. Rock City & Turf Talk)
- 2008: "Twerk It" (Soz feat. Turf Talk)
- 2009: "I'm On Like Shit" (Yukmouth feat. Mistah F.A.B., Sky Balla, & Turf Talk)
- 2009: "Ya'll Know What I'm Doin'" (Tha Dogg Pound feat. Turf Talk)
- 2010: "Knock 'Em Down Music" (E-40 feat. Ya Boy, Turf Talk, & Cousin Fik)
- 2010: "More Bass, More Treble" (E-40 feat. Cousin Fik & Turf Talk)
- 2010: "I'm Gone" (Lazer Sword feat. Turf Talk)
- 2011: "First Date" (The Jacka feat. 12 Gauge Shoite & Turf Talk)
- 2011: "Back & Forth" (E-40 feat. Turf Talk, Cousin Fik, & Stressmatic)
- 2011: "The Streets Don't Love Nobody" (E-40 feat. Turf Talk & DB Tha General)
- 2012: "The Chicken Hill Project" (prod by Hallway Productionz)
- 2012: "In This Thang Breh" (E-40 feat. Turf Talk & Mistah F.A.B.)
- 2012: "Bout My Money" (E-40 & Too Short feat. Jeremih & Turf Talk)
- 2014: "Paint The Picture" (E-40 feat. Cousin Fik & Turf Talk)
- 2014: "It's The First" (E-40 feat. Turf Talk)
- 2015: "707 On Mine" (Rick Rock feat. J-Diggs & Turf Talk)
- 2016: "This Goin' Up" (E-40 feat. Husalah & Turf Talk)
