= Bruce Hornsby discography =

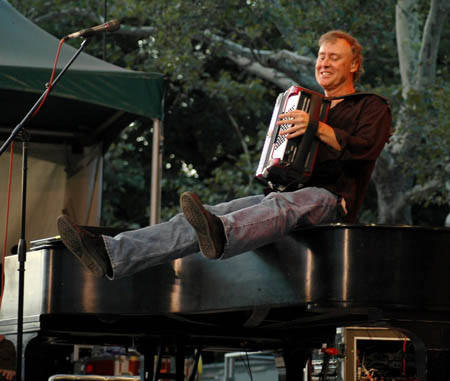
- Studio albums: 10
- Live albums: 4
- Compilation albums: 3
- Singles: 25
- Other live recordings: 6
- Collaborations: 3
- Box sets: 1

Here is a discography of works by Bruce Hornsby. Hornsby released albums with his backing group The Range in his early years, and from 2002 onward with The Noisemakers. He has also released solo albums, as well as collaborations with other artists.

== Studio albums ==
=== with The Range ===
List of albums, with selected details and chart positions
Title	Album details	Peak chart positions								Certifications
Title	Album details	US	AUS	GER	NLD	NZ	SWE	SWI	UK	Certifications
The Way It Is	Released: April 1, 1986; Label: RCA	3	20	10	3	7	25	16	16	RIAA: 3× Platinum; ARIA: Platinum; BPI: Silver
Scenes from the Southside	Released: May 3, 1988; Label: RCA	5	11	12	26	19	15	19	18	RIAA: Platinum; BPI: Gold
A Night on the Town	Released: May 25, 1990; Label: RCA	20	56	36	45	—	39	29	23	RIAA: Gold; BPI: Silver
"—" denotes a recording that did not chart or was not released in that territory.

=== Solo work ===
List of albums, with selected details and chart positions
Title	Album details	Peak chart positions					
Title	Album details	US	AUS	GER	NLD	SWI	UK
Harbor Lights	Released: April 6, 1993; Label: RCA Records	46	118	54	70	—	32
Hot House	Released: July 18, 1995; Label: RCA	68	151	65	—	47	—
Spirit Trail	Released: October 13, 1998; Label: RCA	148	—	—	—	—	—
Absolute Zero	Released: April 2019; Label: Zappo	—	—	—	—	—	—
Non-Secure Connection	Released: August 14, 2020; Label: Zappo	—	—	—	—	—	—
'Flicted	Released: May 27, 2022; Label: Zappo	—	—	—	—	—	—
Indigo Park	Released: April 3, 2026; Label: Zappo, Thirty Tigers						
"—" denotes a recording that did not chart or was not released in that territory.

=== with The Noisemakers ===
List of albums, with selected details and chart positions
Title	Album details	Peak chart positions			
Title	Album details	US	US Rock	US Folk	GER
Big Swing Face	Released: June 25, 2002; Label: RCA Records	—	—	—	—
Halcyon Days	Released: August 17, 2004; Label: Columbia Records	86	—	—	92
Levitate	Released: September 15, 2009; Label: Verve Records	116	47	—	—
Rehab Reunion	Released: June 17, 2016; Label: 429 Records	—	30	13	—
"—" denotes a recording that did not chart or was not released in that territory.

=== Other collaborations ===
- Piano Jazz (2005), Marian McPartland
- Ricky Skaggs & Bruce Hornsby (2007) US (SonyBMG/Legacy), with Ricky Skaggs
- Camp Meeting (2007) with Christian McBride and Jack DeJohnette
- Cluck Ol' Hen (2014), with Ricky Skaggs
- "Voyager One" (2019) with yMusic (single)

=== Compilations ===
- Greatest Radio Hits (2003)
- Playlist: The Very Best of Bruce Hornsby (2010)
- The Essential Bruce Hornsby (2015)

== Live albums ==
List of albums, with selected details and chart positions
Title	Album details	Peak chart positions			Sales
Title	Album details	US	US Rock	US Indie	Sales
The Way It Is Tour (1986-1987) (Japan)	Released: 1987; Label: RCA	—	—	—	
Here Come the Noise Makers (with the Noisemakers)	Released: October 24, 2000; Label: RCA	167	—	—	
Bride of the Noisemakers (with the Noisemakers)	Released: June 7, 2011; Label: 429 Records	125	33	17	US: 16,000
Solo Concerts	Released: August 25, 2014; Label: Vanguard	—	—	47	
"—" denotes a recording that did not chart or was not released in that territory.

=== Live releases ===
A number of recordings of live shows have been made available:

Dagle's Choice

- Dagle's Choice, Volume 1 (2010)
- Dagle's Choice, Volume 2 (2010)
- Dagle's Choice, Volume 3 (2010)
- Dagle's Choice, Volume 4 (2011)

Bruce Hornsby Live releases

- Britt Pavilion, Jacksonville OR - July 6, 2002
- Red Butte Garden, Salt Lake City UT - July 11, 2002
- State Theatre, Kalamazoo MI - July 21, 2002
- Westbury Music Fair, Westbury NY - July 24, 2002
- South Shore Music Circus, Cohasset MA - July 25, 2002
- Wolf Trap, Vienna VA - July 29, 2002
- Biltmore Estates, Asheville NC - August 2, 2002
- Chastain Park, Atlanta GA - August 3, 2002
- Bloomsbury Theatre, London U.K. - September 13, 2004 (solo)
- Muffathalle, Munich Germany - September 15, 2004 (solo)
- Jazzhouse, Copenhagen Denmark - September 22, 2004 (solo)
- Ovens Auditorium, Charlotte NC - October 9, 2004
- Harbor Center Pavilion, Portsmouth VA - October 15, 2004
- Ridgefield Opera House, Ridgefield CT - October 19, 2004
- State University, Buffalo NY - November 1, 2004
- Orpheum Theatre, Boston MA - November 5, 2004
- Kimmel Center, Philadelphia PA - November 6, 2004
- Moore Theater, Seattle WA - November 19, 2004
- Aladdin Theater, Portland OR - November 20, 2004
- McDonald Theatre, Eugene OR - November 22, 2004
- The Vic, Chicago IL - December 2, 2004
- Orpheum Theatre, Madison WI - December 6, 2004
- Fine Arts Center, Grand Rapids MI - December 12, 2004
- Broward Center for the Performing Arts, Ft. Lauderdale FL - February 11, 2005
- Davis Theater, Montgomery AL - February 16, 2005
- House of Blues, New Orleans LA - February 18, 2005
- Paramount Theatre, Austin TX - February 19, 2005
- House of Blues, Anaheim CA - July 20, 2005
- Stewart Park, Roseburg OR - July 26, 2005
- Woodland Park Zoo, Seattle WA - July 27, 2005
- Oregon Zoo, Portland OR - July 29, 2005
- Red Butte Garden, Salt Lake City UT - July 31, 2005
- Tivoli Theatre, Chattanooga TN - August 18, 2005
- Biltmore Estates, Asheville NC - August 20, 2005
- Mann Center, Philadelphia PA - August 30, 2005
- Meadowbrook Arts Center, Gilford NH - September 2, 2005
- William & Mary Hall, Williamsburg VA - December 3, 2005
- Chateau Ste. Michelle, Woodinville WA - July 15, 2006
- Konocti Harbor Resort, Kelseyville CA - July 19, 2006
- Mountain Winery, Saratoga CA - July 20, 2006
- McGlohon Theater, Charlotte NC - August 13, 2006
- Boarding House Park, Lowell MA - August 26, 2006

== DVDs and box sets ==
- A Night on the Town, Bruce Hornsby (w/ guests), (1990)
- Rockpalast Live, Bruce Hornsby and the Range, (1991)
- Bruce Hornsby & Friends, Performance film, (2004)
- Three Nights on the Town, Bruce Hornsby and the Noise Makers, (2005)

Box set

- Intersections (1985-2005) (2006) Legacy Recordings

== Albums with associated acts ==
=== With the Grateful Dead ===
- Infrared Roses (1991)
- Grayfolded (1994,1995)
- Dick's Picks Volume 9 (1997)
- So Many Roads (1965–1995) (1999)
- Dick's Picks Volume 17 (2000)
- View from the Vault, Volume Two (2001), also released as DVD
- Grateful Dead Download Series Volume 11 (2006)
- Road Trips Volume 2 Number 1 (2008)
- 30 Trips Around the Sun (2015)
- 30 Trips Around the Sun: The Definitive Live Story 1965–1995 (2015)
- Robert F. Kennedy Stadium, Washington, D.C., July 12 & 13, 1989 (2017)
- Giants Stadium 1987, 1989, 1991 (2019)
- Saint of Circumstance (2019)
- Enjoying the Ride (2025)
- The Music Never Stopped (2025)
- Dave's Picks Volume 55 (2025)
- Dave's Picks Volume 59 (2026)

=== With the Other Ones ===
- The Strange Remain (1999)

=== Grateful Dead-related album contributions ===
- Deadicated: A Tribute to the Grateful Dead, various artists, (1991)
- The Concert for the Rock and Roll Hall of Fame, various artists, (1996)
- Mickey Hart's Mystery Box, Mickey Hart, (1996)
- Furthur, various artists, (1997)
- Furthur More, various artists, (1997)
- Furthur Most, various artists, (2000)
- Over the Edge and Back, Mickey Hart, (2002)
- Gilford, NH, September 2, 2005, Ratdog, (2005)
- Atlantic City, NJ, September 4, 2005, Ratdog, (2005)
- Pure Jerry: Coliseum, Hampton, VA, November 9, 1991, Jerry Garcia Band, (2006)

== Singles ==
Year	Single	Peak chart positions												Certification	Album
Year	Single	US	US Main	US AC	US Adult Pop	US Triple A	AUS	BEL (Fl)	CAN	GER	NED	NZ	UK	Certification	Album
1986	"Every Little Kiss"	72	18	37	X	X	75	30	—	—	32	—	—		The Way It Is
1986	"The Way It Is"	1	3	1	X	X	12	3	1	16	1	23	15	BPI: Platinum	The Way It Is
1986	"On the Western Skyline"	—	6	—	X	X	—	—	—	—	—	—	—		The Way It Is
1986	"Mandolin Rain"	4	2	1	X	X	84	—	14	—	—	—	70		The Way It Is
1987	"Every Little Kiss" (re-release)	14	—	3	X	X	—	—	36	—	—	—	—		The Way It Is
1988	"The Valley Road"	5	1	1	X	X	36	23	2	20	27	—	44		Scenes from the Southside
1988	"Look Out Any Window"	35	5	7	X	X	—	—	7	—	—	—	88		Scenes from the Southside
1988	"Defenders of the Flag"	—	11	—	X	X	—	—	—	—	—	—	—		Scenes from the Southside
1990	"Across the River"	18	1	8	X	X	110	—	1	—	69	—	85		A Night on the Town
1990	"Lost Soul"	84	—	16	X	X	—	—	47	—	—	—	—		A Night on the Town
1990	"A Night on the Town"	—	4	—	X	X	—	—	54	—	—	—	—		A Night on the Town
1990	"Fire on the Cross"	—	50	—	X	X	—	—	—	—	—	—	—		A Night on the Town
1991	"Set Me in Motion"	—	26	25	X	X	—	—	44	—	—	—	—		Backdraft (soundtrack)
1993	"Harbor Lights"	—	38	13	X	X	180	—	14	—	—	—	—		Harbor Lights
1993	"Fields of Grey"	69	—	7	X	X	—	—	16	67	—	—	—		Harbor Lights
1994	"Rainbow's Cadillac"	121	—	27	X	X	—	—	49	—	—	—	—		Harbor Lights
1995	"Walk in the Sun"	54	—	10	15	—	—	—	4	68	—	—	—		Hot House
1995	"Cruise Control"	—	—	—	—	—	—	—	45	—	—	—	—		Hot House
1996	"Swing Street"	—	—	—	—	—	—	—	31	—	—	—	—		Hot House
1998	"Great Divide"	—	—	—	33	6	—	—	—	—	—	—	—		Spirit Trail
2004	"Gonna Be Some Changes Made"	—	—	35	—	1	—	—	—	—	—	—	—		Halcyon Days
2005	"Dreamland"	—	—	23	—	—	—	—	—	—	—	—	—		Halcyon Days
2019	"Voyager One" (featuring yMusic)	—	—	—	—	—	—	—	—	—	—	—	—		Absolute Zero
2019	"Cast-Off" (featuring Justin Vernon)	—	—	—	—	—	—	100	—	—	—	—	—		Absolute Zero
2020	"My Resolve" (featuring James Mercer)	—	—	—	—	—	—	—	—	—	—	—	—		Non-Secure Connection
2020	"Bright Star Cast" (featuring Jamila Woods and Vernon Reid)	—	—	—	—	—	—	—	—	—	—	—	—		Non-Secure Connection
2020	"Anything Can Happen" (featuring Leon Russell)	—	—	—	—	—	—	—	—	—	—	—	—		Non-Secure Connection
2026	"Indigo Park"	—	—	—	—	34	—	—	—	—	—	—	—		Indigo Park
"—" denotes releases that did not chart

== Miscellaneous Tracks ==
- "Heartbreak Town", from the film Twice Upon a Time (1983)
- "Something to Believe In", with Clannad, from Sirius (1987)
- "Two Kinds of Love", with Stevie Nicks, from The Other Side of the Mirror (1989)
- "The End of the Innocence", with Don Henley, from The End of the Innocence (1989)
- "I Can't Make You Love Me", with Bonnie Raitt, from Luck of the Draw (1991)
- "Madman Across the Water" from Two Rooms: Celebrating the Songs of Elton John & Bernie Taupin (1991)
- "The Star-Spangled Banner", with Branford Marsalis. First performed publicly during the 1991 NBA All-Star Game, later recorded for the documentary Baseball (1994)
- "Love Me Still", with Chaka Khan, Clockers Original Soundtrack (1995)
- "Shadowlands", from the film Bamboozled (2000)
- "Between Me and You" and "Never Get You Right," with Brandon Flowers, The Desired Effect (2015)
