= Greatest Radio Hits =

Greatest hits album by Bruce Hornsby
- Released: 2003
- Recorded: 1986–2003
- Genres: Rock, Pop
- Length: 76:44
- Labels: RCA; Legacy
- Producers: Bruce Hornsby, Steve Strauss

Bruce Hornsby chronology
Big Swing Face (2002)	Greatest Radio Hits (2003)	Halcyon Days (2004)

Professional ratings
Review scores
Source	Rating
AllMusic	4.5/5 stars
The Music Box	4/5 stars

Greatest Radio Hits is a compilation album by Bruce Hornsby. The album was released in Australia on September 8, 2003, and in the United States on January 13, 2004.

Tracks 1 to 5 and 8 to 10 are recordings from Hornsby's time with his band, The Range. Tracks 11 to 15 are from Hornsby's period as a solo artist; tracks 6 and 7 are solo performances, recorded live in August 2002. The album's liner notes advise that tracks 6, 7 and 15 are previously unreleased versions.

== Track listing ==
No.	Title	Notes	Length
1.	"The Way It Is"	From The Way It Is (1986)	4:57
2.	"Mandolin Rain"	From The Way It Is	5:17
3.	"Every Little Kiss"	From The Way It Is	5:48
4.	"The Valley Road"	From Scenes from the Southside (1988)	4:42
5.	"Look Out Any Window"	From Scenes from the Southside	5:28
6.	"Jacob's Ladder" (Live version)	Previously unreleased	4:34
7.	"The End of the Innocence" (Live version)	Previously unreleased	7:18
8.	"Across the River"	From A Night on the Town (1990)	5:11
9.	"Lost Soul" (Single edit)	From A Night on the Town	5:18
10.	"Set Me in Motion"	From soundtrack to 1991 film Backdraft	4:33
11.	"Fields of Gray"	From Harbor Lights (1993)	4:51
12.	"Walk in the Sun" (Single edit)	From Hot House (1995)	4:42
13.	"See the Same Way"	From Spirit Trail (1998)	5:36
14.	"The Good Life"	From Big Swing Face (2002)	3:43
15.	"Go Back to Your Woods"	Previously unreleased; cover of song from 1991 Robbie Robertson album Storyville	4:46
