= Intersections (1985–2005) =

Box set by Bruce Hornsby
- Released: July 25, 2006
- Genres: Rock; Jam band Jazz; Bluegrass
- Label: Legacy Recordings
- Producers: Wayne Pooley, Bruce Hornsby

Bruce Hornsby chronology
Halcyon Days (2004)	Intersections (1985–2005) (2006)	Ricky Skaggs & Bruce Hornsby (2007)

Professional ratings
Review scores
Source	Rating
AllMusic	link

Intersections (1985–2005) is a 4-CD and DVD retrospective boxed set by Bruce Hornsby. The tracks are a mixture of previously unreleased live recordings, unreleased studio recordings, and album cuts. The boxed set's title emphasizes the large number of musical collaborations Hornsby has embarked upon during his career, as evidenced by the list of collaborators below.

The discs are thematically broken into three categories: "Top 90 Time", "Solo Piano, Tribute Records, Country-Bluegrass, Movie Songs," and "By Request (Favorites and Best Songs)" (two CDs). A full third of the music is previously unreleased; many familiar tracks are presented as unreleased live versions rather than the original studio recordings, and the majority of the remaining tracks are from single b-sides, collaborations and/or tribute albums and movie soundtracks.

Some noteworthy collaborations include a piano-and-saxophone duet with Ornette Coleman and a performance with Roger Waters of Pink Floyd's "Comfortably Numb." The set also offers a number of excellent examples of Hornsby's re-inventiveness with his own compositions, particularly in a live setting, for instance three different versions of “The Valley Road” are included—a live "bluesy funk" version with the Noise Makers, a Grammy-winning bluegrass version with the Nitty Gritty Dirt Band, and "a loose and sloppy but totally grooving boogie" take with the Grateful Dead. Critics have said that Hornsby's particular integrations of different musical genres, and his passion for reinventing his own compositions, create a kind of music many might "never hear" otherwise as it is "a kind of music no one else is making."

"Song H" was a new composition that was nominated for Best Pop Instrumental at the 2007 Grammy Awards.

== Track listing ==
All songs written by Bruce Hornsby, except where noted.
(*) denotes previously unreleased live version
(**) denotes previously unreleased track

=== Disc one: "Top 90 Time"' ===
1. "The Way It Is" *
2. "Mandolin Rain" (w/ J. Hornsby) *
3. "The Valley Road" (w/ J. Hornsby) *
4. "Jacob's Ladder" (w/ J. Hornsby) *
5. "Nobody There But Me" (w/ Haden / J. Hornsby) *
6. "The End of Innocence" (w/ Henley) *
7. "Look out Any Window" (w/ J. Hornsby) *
8. "Across the River" (w/ J. Hornsby) *
9. "Lost Soul" *
10. "Fields of Gray" > "That's Where It's At" (Alexander / Cooke) *
11. "Walk in the Sun"
12. "Gonna Be Some Changes Made" *
13. "Dreamland"

=== Disc two: "Solo Piano, Tribute Records, Country-Bluegrass, Movie Songs" ===
1. "Song A"
2. "Song B"
3. "Song C"
4. "Song D"
5. "Variations on Swan Song & Song D"
6. "Song F"
7. "Song H" **
8. "Barcelona Mona"
9. "Backhand" (Jarrett)
10. "Jack Straw" (Hunter, Weir)
11. "Madman Across the Water" (Elton John, Bernie Taupin)
12. "Darlin' Cory" (traditional)
13. "The Valley Road" (w/ J. Hornsby) – bluegrass version
14. "Crown of Jewels" *
15. "Big Stick"
16. "The Valley Road" (w/ J. Hornsby) – performed live with the Grateful Dead *
17. "Hop / Skip and Jump" (Coleman) **
18. "Love Me Still" (w/ Stevens) *
19. "Shadowland"

=== Disc three: "By Request" (Favorites and Best Songs) ===
1. "The Show Goes On" *
2. "Barren Ground" (w/ J. Hornsby)
3. "A Night on the Town" (w/ J. Hornsby) *
4. "Talk of the Town" *
5. "Rainbow's Cadillac"
6. "Pastures of Plenty"
7. "Spider Fingers" > "Tempus Fugit" (Powell) *
8. "White Wheeled Limousine" > "Long Black Veil" (Dill / Wilkin) *
9. "King of the Hill" > "Twelve Tone Tune" (Evans) > "Mystery Train" (Parker / Phillips) *

=== Disc four: "By Request" Part 2 ===
1. "Resting Place"
2. "Preacher in the Ring, Part I"
3. "Preacher in the Ring, Part II"
4. "Fortunate Son" > "Comfortably Numb" (David Gilmour, Roger Waters)" *
5. "Sneaking Up on Boo Radley" *
6. "Shadowhand" *
7. "Sticks & Stones" *
8. "The Chill"
9. "The Good Life"
10. "What the Hell Happened"
11. "Hooray for Tom"
12. "Candy Mountain Run" *

=== DVD ===
1. "The Way It Is" music video
2. "The Valley Road" music video
3. "Look out Any Window" music video
4. "Defenders of the Flag" music video
5. "Across the River" music video
6. "Talk of the Town" music video
7. "Fields of Gray" music video
8. "Walk in the Sun" music video
9. "Swing Street" music video
10. "Go Back to Your Woods w/Robbie Robertson
11. "Barcelona Mona" w/Branford Marsalis
12. "Love Me Still" w/Chaka Khan
13. "The Valley Road" w/Nitty Gritty Dirt Band
14. "The Mighty Quinn" (Bob Dylan) w/B. B. King & Lou Reed
15. "They Love Each Other" (Garcia, Hunter) (as Grateful Dead)
16. "Comfortably Numb" (Gilmour, Waters) w/Roger Waters
17. "Imagine" (John Lennon)
18. "Another Day"
19. "The Tide Will Rise" w/Pat Metheny & Bonnie Raitt
20. "Talk of the Town" w/Gregory Hines
21. "Star-Spangled Banner (Key)" w/Branford Marsalis
22. "Gonna Be Some Changes Made"
23. "Candy Mountain Run"

== "Cast of Characters" ==
- Bruce Hornsby
- Ornette Coleman
- Shawn Colvin
- Bill Evans
- Jerry Garcia
- Grateful Dead
- Big Chief Bo Dollis
- Levon Helm
- Gregory Hines
- David Hollister
- Elton John
- Chaka Khan
- Steve Kimock
- Spike Lee
- Levi Little
- Branford Marsalis
- The Meters
- Pat Metheny
- Nitty Gritty Dirt Band
- The Noise Makers
- Bonnie Raitt
- The Range
- Robbie Robertson
- Ricky Skaggs
- Frank Vincent
- Roger Waters

=== Musicians ===
- Bruce Hornsby
- John "J. T." Thomas
- Bobby Read
- J. V. Collier
- Doug Derryberry
- Sonny Emory
- R. S. Hornsby
- George Marinelli
- John Molo
- Joe Puerta
- Jerry Garcia
- Shawn Murphy
- Laura Creamer-Dunville
- Shawn Colvin
- Jimmy Haslip
- Pat Metheny
- Levi Little
- David Hollister
- John Paris
- Robert Brookins
- Elton John
- Lloyd Jones
- Woody Green
- Ralph Payne
- Branford Marsalis
- Theodore 'Bo' Dollis
- Tim Green
- Clarence Johnson
- Reginald Houston
- Craig Klein
- Jason Marsalis
- Percy Miller
- Joshua Paxton
- Matt Perrine
- Stuart Duncan
- Mark Fain
- Kim Fleming
- Bob Bailey
- Vickie Hampton
- Clay Hess
- Jim Mills
- Ricky Skaggs
- Jeff Hanna
- Jimmy Ibbotson
- Jimmie Fadden
- Bob Carpernter
- Jerry Douglas
- Roy Huskey Jr.
- Bernie Leadon
- Mark O'Conner
- Randy Scruggs
- Terry Burell
- Rodney Denton
- John Tracy
- Mickey Hart
- Bill Kreutzmann
- Phil Lesh
- Bob Weir
- Vince Welnick
- Ornette Coleman
- Bonny Bonaparte
- John Bigham
- Jean McClain
- John D'earth
- Glen Wilson
- Bonnie Raitt
- Debbie Henry
- Matt Chamberlain
- Kyle Davis
- John Leventhal
- John Pierce
- Michael Baker
- David Bendeth
- Steve Kimock
