= Here Come the Noise Makers =

Live album by Bruce Hornsby
- Released: October 24, 2000
- Genre: Rock; Jam band Jazz; Bluegrass
- Length: 2:15:52
- Label: RCA
- Producer: Bruce Hornsby; Wayne Pooley

Bruce Hornsby chronology
Spirit Trail (1998)	Here Come the Noise Makers (2000)	Big Swing Face (2002)

Professional ratings
Review scores
Source	Rating
Allmusic	3/5 stars

Here Come the Noise Makers was the first live album by American singer and pianist Bruce Hornsby. It is a double album comprising songs recorded between 1998 and New Year's Eve 1999/2000. It was Hornsby's first album with his touring act the Noisemakers.

The album not only captures the ambience of one of Hornsby’s concerts, but also reflects the vibrant temperament and true stylistic diversity with which he approaches his craft, treating the live performance like a journey in search of the perfect musical moment.

With this album, Hornsby is determined to create a hybrid style that encompasses rock, jazz, and classical music within a jam band mentality. The concert musical experience captured on the album embodied the gestures towards complete improvisatory musical spontaneity and towards recasting old songs as unrecognizably new that so much of Hornsby's solo work had been forecasting, this time in a full band setting. The album covers pieces by many of Hornsby's musical influences, George Gershwin, Samuel Barber, Bill Evans, Bud Powell and Bob Dylan among them. Hornsby directly acknowledges the influence of the Grateful Dead by performing their songs "Lady with a Fan" and "Black Muddy River" and by including a version of "The Valley Road" that seems to have "emerged from the Grateful Dead's "Wharf Rat."

== Track listing ==
All songs by Bruce Hornsby, except where noted.

Disc 1

1. "Piano Intro"/"Great Divide" - 7:47
2. "Long Tall Cool One" - 7:54
3. "The Red Plains" (Bruce Hornsby, John Hornsby) - 5:58
4. "The Road Not Taken" - 7:22
5. "Lady with a Fan" (Garcia, Hunter) - 5:24
6. "Stander on the Mountain" - 7:51
7. "Jacob's Ladder"/"Blackberry Blossom" (Bruce Hornsby, John Hornsby/Traditional) - 4:31
8. Piano Intro/"I Loves You Porgy"/"Nocturne" (Gershwin, Gershwin, Heyward/Barber) - 4:22
9. "The Way It Is" - 7:01
10. "Twelve Tone Tune"/"King of the Hill" (Evans/Hornsby) - 11:44

Disc 2

1. "Spider Fingers"/"Tempus Fugit" (Powell) - 10:25
2. "Sneaking Up on Boo Radley" - 5:38
3. "Fortunate Son" - 4:47
4. "The Valley Road" (Bruce Hornsby, John Hornsby) - 7:13
5. "The End Of The Innocence" (Don Henley, Bruce Hornsby) - 8:41
6. "Sunflower Cat"/"It Takes a Lot to Laugh, It Takes a Train to Cry" (Garcia, Hunter, Mangini/Bob Dylan) - 9:23
7. "Rainbow's Cadillac" - 7:23
8. "Mandolin Rain"/"Black Muddy River" (Bruce Hornsby, John Hornsby/Garcia, Hunter) - 12:30

== Personnel ==
The Noisemakers

- Bruce Hornsby – lead vocals, acoustic piano, accordion
- John "J.T." Thomas – keyboards, organ, vocals
- Doug Derryberry – guitars, mandolin, vocals
- J. V. Collier – bass
- Michael Baker – drums, vocals
- Bobby Read – bass clarinet, saxophone, vocals

Additional musicians

- Debbie Henry – vocals (1)
- John D'Earth – trumpet (2, 11, 12)
- Steve Kimock – guitar (15)
- Land Richards – drums (4, 6, 7, 14, 16)
- Bonny Bonaparte – drums (15)

== Production ==
- David Bendeth – A&R
- Bruce Hornsby – producer, mixing, liner notes
- Wayne Pooley – producer, mixing
- Bobby Hornsby – associate producer
- Ted Jensen – mastering at Sterling Sound (New York City, New York)
- Melissa Reagan – production assistant
- Henry Marquez and X-Out – art direction, design
- David Halliburton – cover photography
- Carey Wilhelm – all other photography
- Andy Martin and Deep South Entertainment – management

Road crew

- Gary Crosniak
- Caldwell Gray
- Gary Grimm
- Alan Miller
- Georg Slejko
