= Over the Rise =

Over the Rise may refer to:

- "Over the Rise", a song by Big Audio on their 1994 album Higher Power
- "Over the Rise", a song by Bruce Hornsby and the Noisemakers on their 2016 album Rehab Reunion
- "Over the Rise", a song by Bruce Springsteen on his 1998 album Tracks
