= Kobe Doin' Work =

American 2009 documentary film

- Directed by: Spike Lee
- Starring: Kobe Bryant
- Narrated by: Kobe Bryant and Spike Lee
- Composer: Bruce Hornsby
- Country of origin: United States
- Original language: English

Production
- Producers: Spike Lee; Butch Robinson
- Cinematography: Matthew Libatique
- Editor: Barry Alexander Brown
- Running time: 84 minutes
- Production companies: 40 Acres and a Mule Filmworks; ESPN Films

Original release
- Network: ESPN
- Release: May 16, 2009

Kobe Doin' Work is a 2009 documentary film directed by Spike Lee. It focuses on then-NBA basketball player Kobe Bryant before, during, and immediately after one game of the 2007–08 Los Angeles Lakers season against the San Antonio Spurs. Bryant granted filmmaker Spike Lee and 30 cameras total access to his life for one day. Bryant agreed to wear a microphone throughout the day capturing in-game, bench, and locker room conversations. Lee's cameras were also given unprecedented access to the Laker locker room. Kobe: Doin' Work premiered on ESPN on May 16, 2009.

== Plot ==
Kobe Doin’ Work is an 84-minute exploration of Kobe Bryant's work ethic, his in game mentality, and the bluntness that made Bryant a great competitor. Lee uses multiple cameras, sound from the in-game broadcast, the Staples Center, a microphone worn by Kobe himself, and a follow-up narration while he watched the footage to illustrate every detail of Kobe's performance, strategy, and inner thoughts.

Bryant shot 6 of 14 from the field, scored 20 points, and played 32 minutes. The game was a crucial game in the end of the regular season, as the Los Angeles Lakers hoped to keep first place in the Western Conference with a record of 55–25. In an NBA.com 2009 Q&A (now archived) Spike Lee explained in an interview why he chose Kobe Bryant as the subject for this documentary: "I'm a big basketball fan. It was obvious. He was having an MVP-type year, in which he did win the MVP. Also the Lakers looked like they were going to take it to the Finals. And I wanted them to beat the Celtics. I hate the Celtics. But the Celtics won. But I don't think I was taking a gamble by choosing Kobe." Also, according to Spike Lee, "He (Kobe) said several times how much fun it was just doing it."

The 84-minute documentary ran on ESPN commercial free. The documentary also focuses on Bryant and the team in huddles and during time-outs. The cameras also get full access of coach Phil Jackson in the locker room with the team during half-time. Bryant provided the voice-over for the documentary on February 2, 2009, hours after he scored 61 points against the New York Knicks at Madison Square Garden, (then a single-game record at the arena, which has been broken since). Spike Lee said that he was excited for Bryant to do the commentary following a game at Madison Square Garden, but no one expected a 61-point performance from Bryant. "I know that if he had a terrible game the commentary would not have been the same. Guaranteed. But Kobe said he made a point to make sure not to lose the game or he would hear it from me." Bryant indeed said in an after game interview that he was going to give the game his all in order to show Spike Lee a thing or two about Bryant's skills on the court against the Knicks. "On a lighter note, I'm going to review this documentary I'm doing with Spike Lee tonight after the game and I didn't feel like sitting next to him and hearing him talking trash about the Knicks, so that was added incentive as well. Seriously. He's going to get an earful tonight."

== Reception ==
Ryan Cracknell writing for movieviews.ca appreciated the insight into Kobe's game but criticized the "angle switches, speed changes and repetition" as "distracting".

== Similar sports documentaries ==
Kobe Doin' Work is in the same genre as the 2006 sports documentary Zidane: A 21st Century Portrait, as well as the film Football As Never Before (German: Fußball wie noch nie), a documentary made in 1970 by German filmmaker Hellmuth Costard about Manchester United footballer George Best.

== See also ==
- List of basketball films
