= Absolute Zero (Bruce Hornsby album) =

Studio album by Bruce Hornsby
- Released: April 12, 2019
- Genre: Folk, rock
- Length: 42:02
- Label: Zappo
- Producer: Bruce Hornsby: Brad Cook; Justin Vernon; Tony Berg

Bruce Hornsby chronology
Rehab Reunion (2016)	Absolute Zero (2019)	Non-Secure Connection (2020)

Absolute Zero is an album by American singer-songwriter and pianist Bruce Hornsby, released on April 12, 2019 by Zappo Productions. This is Hornsby's sixth solo studio album credited only to his name, the first since Halcyon Days in 2004, and his thirteenth overall album. It features a wide array of guest musicians, including Justin Vernon of Bon Iver, jazz drummer Jack DeJohnette, and the ensemble yMusic. It also features a lyrical contribution from Grateful Dead lyricist Robert Hunter on the closing track, "Take You There (Misty)".

== Composition and lyrics ==
Hornsby cited a plethora of literary and musical inspiration for the music and lyrics of Absolute Zero. When discussing the album in an interview with the Guardian, he said, "There are some minimalist composers that influenced me on this record – Steve Reich, Philip Glass, John Adams – and that tends to be a less chromatic, dissonant area of music." He also cited passages written by authors Don DeLillo and David Foster Wallace as inspiration for the lyrics of the title track and "White Noise", respectively. In an interview with Stereogum, Hornsby said that most of the tracks on Absolute Zero had stemmed from film scoring projects for Spike Lee. "I've been scoring movies for [Lee] and his Netflix series She's Gotta Have It. I've written about 230-plus pieces of music for these many projects. These pieces can range from one minute long to four or five minutes long, and through the years I would always earmark certain cues as being special in the sense that they sounded like they wanted to become songs."

== Critical reception ==
The album received largely positive reviews. Writing for Pitchfork, Stephen Thomas Erlewine awarded the album a score of 7.4 out of 10, writing: "Hornsby writes with elegance, at ease with both his traces of hipness and essential squareness." Jason Heller, writing for NPR, was even more complimentary, writing: "Far from a conventional Hornsby album, Absolute Zero is the sound of an artist subverting expectations and pulling it off brilliantly. At this point in his career, Hornsby could easily coast on writing cozy songs and settling for that. Thankfully for us, he's still up for an adventure." Jon Pareles, writing for The New York Times, named the album a Critic's Pick, praising its ambition and complexity. and describing it as "one more daring, rewarding turn" in Hornsby’s catalog. The album was also awarded a score of 80% by AllMusic, and a score of 82% by Metacritic.

== Track listing ==
No.	Title	Writer(s)	Length
1.	"Absolute Zero" (featuring Jack DeJohnette)	Bruce Hornsby	3:11
2.	"Fractals"	Hornsby	2:33
3.	"Cast-Off" (featuring Justin Vernon)	Hornsby, Vernon	5:16
4.	"Meds" (featuring Vernon, Blake Mills & Rob Moose)	Hornsby	6:34
5.	"Never in This House" (featuring yMusic)	Hornsby, Chip DeMatteo	3:33
6.	"Voyager One" (featuring yMusic)	Hornsby, DeMatteo	3:39
7.	"Echolocation"	Hornsby	4:19
8.	"The Blinding Light of Dreams" (featuring yMusic)	Hornsby, DeMatteo	4:14
9.	"White Noise"	Hornsby	3:27
10.	"Take You There (Misty)" (featuring yMusic)	Hornsby, Robert Hunter	5:11
Total length:			42:02

== Personnel ==
- Bruce Hornsby – vocals, acoustic piano (1–6, 8, 10), drums (1), orchestration (1), percussion (2, 7), violin (2, 7), bass (4, 6), sampling (4, 9, 10), dulcimer (7), organ (10)
- Sean Carey – keyboards (3), vocals (3)
- John "J.T." Thomas – organ (4, 10)
- Jeremy Ylvisaker – guitars (3)
- Gibb Droll – guitars (4, 7), pedal steel guitar (4)
- Jervonny "JV" Collier – bass (2, 4, 6, 10)
- Blake Mills – bass (2), guitars (4)
- Brad Cook – bass (3)
- Chris Croce – bass (5, 8)
- Jack DeJohnette – drums (1)
- Chad Wright – drums (2, 4, 6)
- J.T. Bates – drums (3, 6)
- Sonny Emory – drums (6, 8, 10)
- Chris Messina – loops (3)
- Michael Lewis – saxophone (3)
- Rob Moose – viola (4), string arrangements (4), orchestration (4–6, 8, 10)
- John Malinder – violin (4)
- Bobby Hornsby – violin (7)
- The Orchestra of St. Hank's-Frost School/IL. of Miami – orchestra (8, 10)
- Howard Drossin – orchestration (1)
- Peter Rotter – orchestra conductor (1)
- Bruce Coughlin – orchestration (8, 10)
- Scott Flavin – orchestra conductor (8, 10)
- Justin Vernon – vocals (3), backing vocals (4)
- The Staves – backing vocals (5, 10)

yMusic (Tracks 5, 6, 8 & 10)

- Hideaki Aomori – clarinet
- Alex Sopp – flute
- C.J. Camerieri – trumpet
- Gabriel Cabezas – cello
- Nadia Sirota – viola
- Rob Moose – violin

Virginia Symphony Orchestra on "White Noise"

- Elizabeth Richards – cello
- Christopher White – double bass
- Matt Umlauf – viola
- John Malinder – violin
- Jonathan Richards – violin
- Elizabeth Vonderheide – violin

== Production ==
- Bruce Hornsby – producer, mixing (1–8)
- Tony Berg – producer (3, 4), associate producer
- Brad Cook – producer (3)
- Justin Vernon – mixing (1), producer (3)
- David Boucher – engineer, mixing (1, 9, 10)
- Pat Dillett – engineer
- Chris Messina – engineer
- Wayne Pooley – engineer, mixing (1–9)
- Huntley Miller – mastering at HM Mastering (Minneapolis, Minnesota)
- Terry Greene – piano technician
- Chip DeMatteo – design, artwork
- Kathy Hornsby – photography
- Marc Allan and Kevin Monty with Red Light Management – management
