= Rehab Reunion =

Studio album by Bruce Hornsby and the Noisemakers
- Released: June 17, 2016
- Studio: Tossington Sound (Williamsburg, Virginia)
- Genre: Rock; Folk
- Label: 429 Records
- Producer: Bruce Hornsby

Bruce Hornsby and the Noisemakers chronology
| Bride of the Noisemakers (2011) | Rehab Reunion (2016) | Absolute Zero (2019) |

Professional ratings
Review scores
| Source | Rating |
|---|---|
| AllMusic | 4/5 stars |

Rehab Reunion is the sixth album (fourth studio album) by Bruce Hornsby with his current touring band, the Noisemakers. Released on June 17, 2016, the album is notable in that Hornsby, widely recognized for his piano capabilities, does not play piano on the album at all. Rather, he plays the dulcimer. The album also marks Hornsby's first release on 429 Records.

Like on many of his previous releases, Rehab Reunion features collaborations with guest artists close to Hornsby. Justin Vernon of Bon Iver sings background vocals on "Over the Rise" and Mavis Staples duets with Hornsby on "Celestial Railroad". Also noteworthy is a folk version of "The Valley Road", originally a hit in 1988 with Hornsby's first backing band, the Range.

== Track listing ==
| No. | Title | Writer(s) | Length |
|---|---|---|---|
| 1. | "Over The Rise" | Bruce Hornsby | 5:13 |
| 2. | "Soon Enough" | Bruce Hornsby; C. DeMatteo | 4:41 |
| 3. | "M.I.A. in MIAMI" | Bruce Hornsby; C. DeMatteo | 4:14 |
| 4. | "Tipping" | Bruce Hornsby; C. DeMatteo | 3:44 |
| 5. | "Rehab Reunion" | Bruce Hornsby; C. DeMatteo | 3:14 |
| 6. | "Hey Kafka" | Bruce Hornsby; C. DeMatteo | 4:18 |
| 7. | "Tropical Cashmere Sweater" | Bruce Hornsby; Robert Hunter | 6:08 |
| 8. | "TSA Man" | Bruce Hornsby | 4:12 |
| 9. | "The Valley Road" | Bruce Hornsby; John Hornsby | 6:45 |
| 10. | "Celestial Railroad" (featuring Mavis Staples) | Bruce Hornsby | 4:08 |
| Total length: | | | 46:37 |

Rehab Reunion – iTunes Deluxe Bonus Edition
| No. | Title | Length |
|---|---|---|
| 11. | "Green, Green Rocky Road" | 3:42 |
| 12. | "The Good Life" | 4:57 |
| 13. | "Shadow Hand" | 4:08 |
| Total length: | | 59:24 |

== Personnel ==
The Noisemakers

- Bruce Hornsby – vocals, dulcimer
- John "J. T." Thomas – organ
- Gibb Droll – electric guitars, acoustic guitars
- Ross Holmes – fiddle, mandolin
- J. V. Collier – bass
- Sonny Emory – drums, washboard, cajón

Guest musicians

- Moyes Lucas – washboard on "The Valley Road"
- Justin Vernon – backing vocals on "Over the Rise"
- Mavis Staples – vocals on "Celestial Railroad"

== Production ==
- Bruce Hornsby – producer, mixing, art direction
- Wayne Pooley – engineer, mixing
- B.J. Burton – session engineer for Justin Vernon at April Base (Fall Creek, Wisconsin)
- Mathieu LeJeune – session engineer for Mavis Staple at Chicago Recording Company (Chicago, Illinois)
- Gavin Lurssen – mastering at Lurssen Mastering (Hollywood, California)
- Patti Oates Martin – production assistant
- Chip DeMatteo – graphic design, inclusion photography
- Kathy Hornsby – cover photography, booklet photography
- Lex Selig – booklet photography
- Sean Smith – booklet photography
- Marc Allan and Kevin Monty for Red Light Management – management

Road crew

- Peter Banta
- Chuck Keith
- Jorge Lazzeri
- Wayne Pooley

== Charts ==
| Chart (2016) | Peak position |
|---|---|
| US Top Rock Albums (Billboard) | 30 |
| US Americana/Folk Albums (Billboard) | 13 |
