= Harbor Lights (Bruce Hornsby album) =

Studio album by Bruce Hornsby
- Released: April 6, 1993
- Studios: Bruce Hornsby's House (Williamsburg, Virginia); Acme Recording Studios (Mamaroneck, New York)
- Genres: Rock; jazz; soft rock
- Length: 52:39
- Label: RCA
- Producer: Bruce Hornsby

Bruce Hornsby chronology
A Night on the Town (1990)	Harbor Lights (1993)	Hot House (1995)

Harbor Lights is the fourth album by Bruce Hornsby and was released by RCA Records in 1993. It was the first album credited solely to Hornsby, without his previous backing band, the Range. It was also his first album released under the management company Q-Prime. The album cover uses Edward Hopper's 1951 painting Rooms By the Sea.

== Background ==
On Harbor Lights, Hornsby set out to create an album that was distinct from his previous releases. He felt that his first two albums had been "70% me and a machine", and that his third album was an attempt to incorporate a greater degree of improvisation, which Hornsby said was not fully achieved. To this end, Hornsby opted to forgo the use of The Range and an outside producer, instead opting to produce the album himself and solicit the help of guest musicians. Hornsby believed that the album marked a departure from his earlier offerings, saying "I'm typecast as a Top-40 cat. But this album should dash anybody's notion about that."

Discussing his use of guest musicians, Hornsby said that he "called whomever I heard in my head for that particular song. They would stay at my house, stay for dinner, work on the record and take a walk in the woods. It was a very relaxed atmosphere". Among the featured musicians on the album were Pat Metheny, Branford Marsalis, Jerry Garcia, Phil Collins and Bonnie Raitt.

Unlike earlier albums, Harbor Lights allowed more space for Hornsby's and guest-players' "extended instrumental" solos to "flow naturally" out of the songs. Pat Metheny played electric sitar and the guitar solos on the title track, which was also released as a single. The album's second track, "Talk of the Town", was written about prejudice exhibited toward an interracial couple from Hornsby's hometown in Virginia. The album closes with "Pastures of Plenty", a collaboration with Garcia, who Hornsby played roughly 100 shows with as a sideman for the Grateful Dead.

The mid-tempo "Fields of Gray", written for Hornsby's twin sons, peaked at No. 69 on the Billboard Hot 100 in November 1993. Hornsby wrote "The Tide Will Rise" about his ancestors who emigrated from England to Virginia and Kentucky starting in the late 18th century, who worked in the Chesapeake Bay in the crab and oyster industry.

Following the release of Harbor Lights, Hornsby embarked on a tour that began in Amsterdam on June 9 and included a date at The Jazz Cafe in London.

== Critical reception ==
Professional ratings
Review scores
Source	Rating
AllMusic	4/5 stars
Entertainment Weekly	B-

Billboard wrote that Harbor Lights "presents a wider musical range than [Hornsby's] previous work, and shows a deeper involvement in jazz modes". Music & Media thought that Hornsby "opted for a far more jazzy flavour" on Harbor Lights.

Writing for Entertainment Weekly, Dave DiMartino said that Harbor Lights "exudes the same warmth, the same sense of every note being in the right place as, say, James Taylor's Gorilla — and unfortunately, in 1993, most people may want to hear it about as often." J. D. Considine of Musician magazine believed that Hornsby placed more of an emphasis on songwriting with Harbor Lights, where he decided on "casting each arrangement in terms of what the song needs, not what the players want."

Stereo Review thought that the differences between Harbor Lights and Hornsby's previous works "aren't monumental...but they're the signs of a restless musical mind", adding "Where he once played piano with a new-agey jazz accent, you can hear a number of different dialects here, from Keith Jarrett to Vince Guaraldi." AllMusic praised Harbor Lights for its "cooler, jazzier sound" and its "affinity for sincere portraits of American life, love, and heartache."

== Track listing ==
All music and lyrics by Bruce Hornsby, except where noted.

No.	Title	Lyrics	Length
1.	"Harbor Lights"		7:11
2.	"Talk of the Town"		5:11
3.	"Long Tall Cool One"		4:59
4.	"China Doll"		5:16
5.	"Fields of Gray"		4:52
6.	"Rainbow's Cadillac"		4:37
7.	"Passing Through"		5:58
8.	"The Tide Will Rise"	B. Hornsby, John Hornsby	3:55
9.	"What a Time"	J. Hornsby	4:03
10.	"Pastures of Plenty"		6:37

== Personnel ==
=== On all tracks ===
- Bruce Hornsby – vocals, grand piano, organ, accordion, synthesizers
- Jimmy Haslip – bass
- John Molo – drums

=== Additional personnel, by track ===
"Harbor Lights"

- Pat Metheny – guitar solo, sitar
- John Bigham – rhythm guitar
- Laura Creamer-Dunville – backing vocals
- Jean McClain – backing vocals
- Dave Duncan – MIDI man
- Jeff Lorber – loops

"Talk of the Town"

- Branford Marsalis – soprano saxophone
- Jeff Lorber – programming
- Will Ross – rhythm guitar
- Pat Metheny – guitar
- Phil Collins – bongos

"Long Tall Cool One"

- Branford Marsalis – soprano saxophone
- Phil Collins – backing vocals

"China Doll"

- Pat Metheny – guitar solo
- Phil Collins – backing vocals
- Tony Berg – guitar chords
- Wayne Pooley – guitar chords

"Fields of Gray"

- Phil Collins – tambourine, backing vocals
- John McLaughlin Williams – violin
- Laura Roelofs Park – violin
- Beverly K. Baker – viola
- William Conita – cello
- Lamont Coward – percussion

"Rainbow's Cadillac"

- John Bigham – lead and rhythm guitars
- Bonnie Raitt – backing vocals
- Laura Creamer-Dunville – backing vocals
- Jean McClain – backing vocals
- John D'earth – trumpet
- Glenn Wilson – horns
- Branford Marsalis – saxophone

"Passing Through"

- John Bigham – guitar
- Laura Creamer-Dunville – backing vocals
- Jean McClain – backing vocals
- Jerry Garcia – guitar

"The Tide Will Rise"

- Pat Metheny – rhythm guitar and guitar solo
- Bonnie Raitt – backing vocals
- Debbie Henry – backing vocals
- Laura Creamer-Dunville – backing vocals
- Jean McClain – backing vocals
- Bona Cheri Williams – backing vocals
- John D'earth – trumpet
- Glenn Wilson – horns
- George Gailes III – horns
- Roy Muth – horns
- Tim Streagle – horns
- George Harple – French horn
- Philip Koslow – French horn
- Adam Lesnick – French horn
- Alan Peterson – French horn

"What A Time"

- Debbie Henry – backing vocals
- Bona Cheri Williams – backing vocals
- John D'earth – trumpet
- Glenn Wilson – horns
- George Gailes III – horns
- Roy Muth – horns
- Tim Streagle – horns

"Pastures of Plenty"

- Jerry Garcia – guitar
- John McLaughlin Williams – violin
- Laura Roelofs Park – violin
- Beverly Baker – viola
- William Comita – cello

== Production ==
- Bruce Hornsby – producer, horn charts
- Wayne Pooley – engineer, mixing (1, 3–5, 7, 8, 10)
- Steve Strassman – engineer
- Eddie King – additional engineer
- Keith Cohen – mixing (2)
- David Leonard – mixing (2, 6, 9)
- Bob Ludwig – mastering at Gateway Mastering (Portland, Maine) and Masterdisk (New York City, New York)
- John McLaughlin Williams – string quartet charts
- Sharona Sabbag – production assistant
- Shamina Singh – production assistant
- Amy Wenzler – production assistant
- Norman Moore – art direction, design
- Edward Hopper – cover and inside artwork
- Greg Gorman – back cover photography
- Carey Wilhelm – inside photography
- Q-Prime, Inc. – management
- Leo Schatzel – piano tuning and service
- Carolyn Chrzan – guitar technician for Pat Metheny
- Danny Gillen – tambourine technician

== Charts ==
Weekly chart performance for Harbor Lights
Chart (1993)	Peak position
Dutch Albums (Album Top 100)	70
German Albums (Offizielle Top 100)	54
UK Albums (Official Charts)	32
US Billboard 200	46
