= Across the River (song) =

1990 single by Bruce Hornsby and the Range

Single by Bruce Hornsby and the Range

from the album A Night on the Town
- B-side: "Fire on the Cross"
- Released: June 1990
- Genre: Heartland rock
- Length: 5:10
- Label: RCA
- Songwriters: Bruce Hornsby; John Hornsby
- Producers: Bruce Hornsby; Don Gehman

Bruce Hornsby and the Range singles chronology
"Look Out Any Window" (1988)	"Across the River" (1990)	"Lost Soul" (1990)

"Across the River" is a song by American musical group Bruce Hornsby and the Range. The song was co-written by Bruce Hornsby and his brother John and was the first single released from the band's studio album, A Night on the Town. The single charted in several countries, including the United States, United Kingdom, Canada, the Netherlands, and Germany.

== Background ==
Jerry Garcia, a member of The Grateful Dead had contributed lead guitar to the song. Hornsby began playing with the band in 1988 and later accumulated around 100 performances with them. "Across the River" was one of two songs Garcia played on that reached the US top 40, with the other being "Touch of Grey". Hornsby discussed "Across the River" in an interview published in Musician magazine.

That song is really about me. I just made it about the girl so it wouldn't be an ' I' song. It's about someone who has ambitions to do something out of the ordinary—something that doesn't fit the norm of this very conservative area.

"Across the River" was the highest debuting song on the US Billboard Hot 100 and the Canadian RPM 100 singles chart for the week ending June 23, 1990, where it entered at number 63 and number 51 respectively. It later peaked at No. 18 on the Billboard Hot 100, becoming Hornsby's final top twenty hit on that chart. "Across the River" also reached number one on Canada's RPM 100 Singles chart and topped the US Album Rock Tracks chart.

== Critical reception ==
Billboard said that "Across the River" had a "harder rock edge than in the past" and was "sure to be a multiformat success." RPM magazine called "Across the River" "a powerful track destined to be a hit".

Writing for Entertainment Weekly, Greg Sandow referred to "Across the River" as the "most satisfying song on the album", A Night on the Town. Jon Smith of Musician magazine identified "Across the River" as one of the songs on A Night on the Town that "depict quieter desperation, namely, the struggle to reconcile callow dreams and adult disappointments."

== Track listings ==
7-inch and cassette single

1. "Across the River" (single edit) – 4:43
2. "Fire on the Cross" – 4:38

12-inch and CD single

1. "Across the River" (single edit) – 4:43
2. "Fire on the Cross" – 4:38
3. "Mandolin Rain" (live version) – 6:31

Japanese mini-CD single

1. "Across the River" – 5:13
2. "Fire on the Cross" – 4:37

== Charts ==
=== Weekly charts ===
Chart (1990)	Peak position
Canada Top Singles (RPM)	1
Canada Adult Contemporary (RPM)	2
European Airplay (Music & Media)	7
Netherlands (Dutch Top 40 Tipparade)	17
Netherlands (Single Top 100)	69
UK Singles (Official Charts)	85
US Billboard Hot 100	18
US Adult Contemporary (Billboard)	8
US Album Rock Tracks (Billboard)	1
US Cash Box Top 100	16

=== Year-end charts ===
Chart (1990)	Position
Canada Top Singles (RPM)	14
Canada Adult Contemporary (RPM)	28
US Album Rock Tracks (Billboard)	15

== Release history ==
Region	Date	Format(s)	Label(s)	Ref.
United States	June 1990	7-inch vinyl; cassette	RCA	
Australia	July 2, 1990	7-inch vinyl; cassette	RCA	
Japan	July 4, 1990	Mini-CD	RCA	
United Kingdom	July 9, 1990	7-inch vinyl; 12-inch vinyl; CD	RCA	
Australia	July 30, 1990	CD	RCA	
