= Scenes from the Southside =

Studio album by Bruce Hornsby and the Range
- Released: May 3, 1988
- Recorded: 1987–1988
- Studios: A&M Studios (Hollywood); Rumbo Recorders (Canoga Park); Kingsound Studios (Hollywood); Capitol Studios (Hollywood); Ignited Production (Los Angeles)
- Genres: Rock; soft rock
- Length: 48:30
- Label: RCA
- Producers: Neil Dorfsman; Bruce Hornsby

Bruce Hornsby chronology
The Way It Is (1986)	Scenes from the Southside (1988)	A Night on the Town (1990)

Professional ratings
Review scores
Source	Rating
AllMusic	4.5/5 stars
Robert Christgau	C

Scenes from the Southside is the second album by Bruce Hornsby and the Range. The single "The Valley Road" was Hornsby's third (and last) Top 10 U.S. hit, peaking at number five on the Billboard Hot 100, and also his first number one on the Billboard Album Rock Tracks chart. It became his third chart-topper on the Billboard adult contemporary chart, following "The Way It Is" and "Mandolin Rain".

Other notable tracks on the record were the single "Look Out Any Window", which reached the top 40 in the United States; "The Show Goes On", which was featured in Ron Howard's 1991 film Backdraft, as well as the pilot episode of Baywatch; and "Jacob's Ladder", which was written by Bruce and John Hornsby and became number-one hit for Huey Lewis and the News in March 1987. In addition, in 2023, "The Show Goes On" was used in The Bear season two premiere episode, "Beef."

== Background ==
Following the commercial success of Bruce Hornsby and the Range's debut album, The Way It Is, Hornsby felt obligated to follow this up with a stronger album. He mentioned that his record label, RCA, gave him space to record Scenes from the Southside unimpeded. Hornsby wrote "The Valley Road" as a critique about his perception of people in Williamsburg, Virginia romanticizing the past, expressing his belief that "it's a place that looks back a lot." "The Road Not Taken" was inspired by Lee Smith's book Oral History. Hornsby described it as "a very folky song" that transitions into a jazzier section with more of a groove. All of the lyrics for "Defenders of the Flag" were written by Hornsby's brother, John Hornsby.

Billboard announced that Scenes From the Southside would be released by RCA Records on March 28, 1988 and that "The Valley Road" would be the album's first single. RCA later pushed the album's release date back to April 21, 1988. Music & Media said that the album would receive a release date of May 3, 1988 in Europe. Prior to its release, Hornsby also previewed songs from Scenes From the Southside at the 1988 NARM best-sellers awards banquet. By August 1988, Scenes from the Southside had sold more than one million units.

== Critical reception ==
In their review of Scenes from the Southside, Billboard wrote that the album's "batch of songs-steeped with multiformat appeal underlines the formidable writing talents that his debut album promised." Cashbox characterized Hornsby's songs as "vivid stories" and compared them to the work of John Mellencamp. They also highlighted Hornsby's piano playing on the album, particularly on "The Valley Road" and "Look Out Any Window". Music Week said that the album "continues Hornsby's trademark piano-based sound" with a focus on issues related to "ecology, TV preachers, hypocrisy, etc." and "high class instrumental backing unlike any other competitor in the chart race." The Chicago Tribune felt that the material on Scenes from the Southside bore a close resemblance to his song "The Way It Is".

== Track listing ==
All tracks are written by Bruce Hornsby and John Hornsby, except where noted.

No.	Title	Writer(s)	Length
1.	"Look Out Any Window"		5:28
2.	"The Valley Road"		4:43
3.	"I Will Walk with You"		4:36
4.	"The Road Not Taken"	Bruce Hornsby	7:07
5.	"The Show Goes On"	Bruce Hornsby	7:30
6.	"The Old Playground"		4:27
7.	"Defenders of the Flag"		4:28
8.	"Jacob's Ladder"		4:37
9.	"Till the Dreaming's Done"	Bruce Hornsby	5:12

== Personnel ==
=== The Range ===
- Bruce Hornsby – lead vocals, piano, synthesizer, accordion
- George Marinelli – guitar, mandolin, backing vocals
- Peter Harris – guitar, mandolin
- Joe Puerta – bass, backing vocals
- John Molo – drums

==== Additional musicians ====
- Huey Lewis – harmonica (7)
- Jeff Gerson – percussion
- Steve Watson – guitar consultant
- Jimmy Bralower – drum programming
- David Roitstein – synthesizer programming

=== Technical ===
- Produced by Neil Dorfsman and Bruce Hornsby
- Engineered and mixed by Neil Dorftsman and Eddie King at The Grey Room (Hollywood, CA)
- Additional engineers – Rob Jacobs, Brian Schueble, Julian Stoll, Andrew Udoff, Jim Dineen, Steve "Sound" Cormier, and Greg Bartheld
- Digital editing – Bill Dooley at A&M Studios
- Mastered by Bob Ludwig at Masterdisk (New York, NY)
- A&R direction – Paul Atkinson
- Production coordinator – Sharona Sabbag
- Art direction – Ria Lewerke and Norman Moore
- Cover photography – Dennis Keeley
- Liner and inner sleeve photography – Robert Llewellyn
- Design – Norman Moore
- Management – Tim Neece

== Charts and certifications ==
=== Weekly charts ===
Chart (1988)	Peak position
Australian Albums (ARIA)	11
Austrian Albums (Ö3 Austria)	27
Canada Top Albums/CDs (RPM)	6
Dutch Albums (Album Top 100)	26
European Albums (Music & Media)	21
German Albums (Offizielle Top 100)	12
New Zealand Albums (RMNZ)	19
Norwegian Albums (VG-lista)	15
Swedish Albums (Sverigetopplistan)	15
Swiss Albums (Schweizer Hitparade)	19
UK Albums (Official Charts)	18
US Billboard 200	5

=== Year-end charts ===
Chart (1988)	Position
Canadian Albums (RPM)	25
German Albums (Offizielle Top 100)	44
US Billboard 200	38

=== Certifications ===
Region	Certification	Certified units/sales
Canada (Music Canada)	Platinum	100,000^{^}
United Kingdom (BPI)	Gold	100,000^{^}
United States (RIAA)	Platinum	1,000,000^{^}
^{^} Shipments figures based on certification alone.
