= Bride of the Noisemakers =

Live album by Bruce Hornsby & the Noisemakers
- Released: June 7, 2011
- Recorded: 2007–2009
- Genres: Rock, jazz
- Length: 1:57:07
- Label: 429 Records
- Producers: Wayne Pooley; Bruce Hornsby

Bruce Hornsby & the Noisemakers chronology
Levitate (2009)	Bride of the Noisemakers (2011)	Rehab Reunion (2016)

Professional ratings
Review scores
Source	Rating
AllMusic	3.5/5 stars

Bride of the Noisemakers is the fifteenth album—and second live album—by Bruce Hornsby with his touring band the Noisemakers. The double album, released in 2011, consists of 25 songs recorded between 2007 and 2009.

The album debuted on Billboard 200 at No. 125, selling around 4,000 copies in the first week. It has sold 16,000 copies as of May 2016.

== Track listing ==
All songs by Bruce Hornsby, except where noted.

Disc one

1. "Cyclone" (Robert Hunter, Hornsby) – 5:40
2. "Country Doctor" – 7:59
3. "Funhouse" – 7:45
4. "This Too Shall Pass" – 5:03
5. "Circus on the Moon" – 7:09
6. "Defenders of the Flag" (John Hornsby, Bruce Hornsby) – 5:03
7. "Intro/Variation II (excerpt)/Catenaires (excerpt)" (Bobby Read/Anton Webern/Elliott Carter) – 2:04
8. "Talk of the Town/Charlie, Woody 'n' You" (Hornsby/Charles Ives, Hornsby) – 6:17
9. "What the Hell Happened" – 3:38
10. "Fortunate Son/Comfortably Numb" (Hornsby/Roger Waters, David Gilmour) – 10:20
11. "Levitate" (Thomas Newman, Hornsby) – 4:58
12. "Little Sadie/White Wheeled Limousine/Just One More" (Traditional/Hornsby/George Jones) – 13:08

Disc two

1. "The Wind Up/Big Rock Candy Mountain/Candy Mountain Run" (Keith Jarrett/Traditional/Hornsby) – 7:36
2. "Line in the Dust" – 5:43
3. "Shadow Hand" – 4:16
4. "Tango King" – 7:11
5. "Resting Place" – 10:16
6. "Michael Raphael" (Chip deMatteo, Hornsby) – 3:36
7. "Sonata, Movement IV (excerpt)" (Samuel Barber) – 2:18
8. "Gonna Be Some Changes Made" – 5:48
9. "Dreamland" – 8:22
10. "The Good Life" – 4:26
11. "Cartoons & Candy" – 2:54
12. "Swan Song" – 6:42
13. "Standing on the Moon/Halcyon Days" (Jerry Garcia, Robert Hunter/Hornsby) – 8:55

== Personnel ==
The Noisemakers

- Bruce Hornsby – lead vocals, acoustic piano, accordion, dulcimer
- John "J. T. " Thomas – keyboards, organ, backing vocals
- Doug Derryberry – electric guitars, acoustic guitars, mandolin, backing vocals
- J. V. Collier – bass
- Sonny Emory – drums
- Bobby Read – saxophones, EWI, bass clarinet, backing vocals

Guest musician

- R. S. Hornsby – guitar ("Standing on the Moon")

== Production ==
- Bruce Hornsby – producer, mixing
- Wayne Pooley – producer, mixing
- Tossington Sound (Williamsburg, Virginia) – mixing location
- Randy Merrill – mastering at Masterdisk (New York City, New York)
- Pat Martin – cover photography
- Katherine Fisher – booklet photography
- Sean Smith – booklet photography
- Carey Wilhelm – booklet photography
- WFN Productions – graphic design
- Marc Allan for Red Light Management – management
- Dan Weiner for Paradigm Talent – booking

Road crew

- Reggie Bankston
- Peter Banta
- Vic Goel
- Caldwell Gray
- Jeremaine Israel
- Mo Jackson
- Charles Keith
- Wayne Pooley

== Charts ==
Chart (2011)	Peak position
US Billboard 200	125
US Independent Albums (Billboard)	17
US Top Rock Albums (Billboard)	33
