= Lost Soul (song) =

1990 single by Bruce Hornsby and the Range

Single by Bruce Hornsby and the Range

from the album A Night on the Town
- B-side: "Stander on the Mountain"
- Released: October 1990
- Length: 5:45 (album version); 5:12 (single mix)
- Label: RCA
- Songwriter: Bruce Hornsby
- Producers: Bruce Hornsby; Don Gehman

Bruce Hornsby and the Range singles chronology
"Across the River" (1990)	"Lost Soul" (1990)	"Set Me in Motion" (1991)

"Lost Soul" is a song by the American musical group Bruce Hornsby and the Range. It was written by Bruce Hornsby about one of his family members who had committed suicide while Bruce was playing in his hometown. Hornsby sang the "Lost Soul" as a duet with the American singer-songwriter Shawn Colvin. "Lost Soul" was also released as the second single from the band's third studio album, A Night on the Town. The single reached the top 100 in both Canada and the United States, with it performing the best on both countries' respective adult contemporary charts.

== Background ==
Hornsby wrote "Lost Soul" about his cousin, Eddie Hornsby. In an interview with Musician magazine, Hornsby said that he generally refrained from talking about the song's subject matter saying: "Usually, I tend to be very open about my songs and they're very personal, but that one's a little too personal and hard-hitting to my family."

Hornsby told The Roanoke Times that Eddie Hornsby had committed suicide the same evening that Bruce had returned to his hometown in October 1988 to play at William and Mary Hall, a venue located one mile away from Eddie's house. Discussing "Lost Soul" with The Denver Post, Hornsby said that the first few verses of the song consisted of dialogue from "a bunch of people talking about a guy", with the individual in question providing their perspective on the final verse.

Hornsby initially had Emmylou Harris in mind when selecting a vocalist to duet with him on "Lost Soul". The vocals were out of Harris' range, so Shawn Colvin recorded the part instead. Hornsby said that the song "Barbara Allen" informed some of the melodic decisions made on "Lost Soul". He called "Lost Soul" his favorite song on A Night on the Town adding that it was "the one that means the most to me".

After the song's release, Hornsby recalled being approached by Vietnam veterans, informing him that they particularly related to the song. Elton John, who performed "Lost Soul" with Hornby twice in 1992, told him that the song "changed his life". In 1999, Hornsby performed the "Lost Soul" live at the Red Rocks Amphitheatre, during which Jackson Browne sang the first verse, Bonnie Raitt sang the first part of the second verse, Colvin covered the second half of the second verse, and Hornsby handled the third verse. Hornsby said that this was the approach he conceived of for "Lost Soul", commenting "finally, we are doing it the way it was written."

== Release ==
"Lost Soul" was first serviced to adult contemporary radio stations. It was initially added to 44 adult contemporary radio stations across the United States, which amounted to 54 percent of all radio stations in that format by the week of October 12, 1990. Two weeks later, the Gavin Report said that 65% of its adult contemporary panel had included "Lost Soul" on their playlists.

For the week ending November 10, 1990, "Lost Soul" debuted at No. 63 on the Canadian singles chart, making it the highest debut on that listing. That same week, a music video for "Lost Soul" was launched on VH1.

== Critical reception ==
Billboard said that "Lost Soul" contained Horsby’s "trademark philosophical lyrics and lush piano interludes. They also believed that Hornsby and Colvin had "a measured and natural vocal compatibility" on the song. Reviewing "Lost Soul" for the Gavin Report, Diane Rufer and Ron Fell wrote that "the song recalls the brilliance of the Peter Gabriel/Kate Bush epic, 'Don't Give Up'". In the same publication, Dave Sholin praised "Lost Soul" as "a stunning duet" that "deserve(d) special recognition" with a "touching lyric" and "a sweet melody". Jon Young of Musician magazine was more critical of the song, saying that it was "more patronizing than perceptive".

== Chart performance ==
Chart (1990)	Peak position
Canada Top Singles (RPM)	47
Canada Adult Contemporary Singles (RPM)	10
US Billboard Hot 100	84
US Adult Contemporary (Billboard)	16
