= Levitate (Bruce Hornsby album) =

Studio album by Bruce Hornsby & the Noisemakers
- Released: September 15, 2009
- Studios: Tossington Sound (Williamsburg, Virginia); Zeitgeist Studios (Los Angeles, California)
- Genres: Rock; Jazz
- Length: 50:57
- Label: Verve
- Producers: Bruce Hornsby; Tony Berg; Wayne Pooley

Bruce Hornsby & the Noisemakers chronology
Camp Meeting (2007)	Levitate (2009)	Bride of the Noisemakers (2011)

Professional ratings
Review scores
Source	Rating
Allmusic	3.5/5 stars

Levitate is the tenth studio album by Bruce Hornsby. It was Hornsby's third studio album with his touring band, Bruce Hornsby and the Noisemakers, and was his first release with Verve Records.

Somewhat a musical departure for Hornsby and the Noisemakers, Levitate features no piano solos. Many of the songs also feature lyrical motifs of science and nature. Several songs were co-written with Chip DeMatteo for a stage musical titled SCKBSTD.

The title track was used in Spike Lee's documentary Kobe Doin' Work. Invisible was featured in the Bobcat Goldthwait movie World's Greatest Dad, in which Hornsby also made a cameo appearance as himself.

Much like the 2004 release Halcyon Days, Levitate features guest artists and those close to Hornsby, most notably Eric Clapton, Hornsby's twin sons Russell and Keith, Grateful Dead lyricist Robert Hunter, and Hornsby's nephew R.S. Hornsby, who was killed in a car accident less than a week after recording a memorable guitar solo on "Continents Drift." The album has been dedicated to his memory.

== Track listing ==
1. "The Black Rats of London" (B.R. Hornsby) - 4:16
2. "Prairie Dog Town" (B.R. Hornsby, Pharrell Williams, Calvin Broadus, Chad Hugo) - 4:14
3. "Cyclone" (B.R. Hornsby, Robert Hunter) - 4:45
4. "Continents Drift" (B.R. Hornsby, Chip DeMatteo) - 7:22
5. "Paperboy" (B.R. Hornsby, Chip DeMatteo) - 5:04
6. "Invisible" (B.R. Hornsby) - 3:36
7. "Levitate" (B.R. Hornsby, Thomas Newman (Score from The Shawshank Redemption)) - 3:36
8. "Here We Are Again" (B.R. Hornsby, Chip DeMatteo) - 3:55
9. "Space is the Place" (Sonny Emory, J.V. Collier, B.R. Hornsby) - 4:24
10. "Michael Raphael" (B.R. Hornsby, Chip DeMatteo) - 2:54
11. "Simple Prayer" (B.R. Hornsby, Chip DeMatteo) - 4:04
12. "In The Low Country" (B.R. Hornsby) - 4:38
13. "I Truly Understand" [Bonus Track] (B.R. Hornsby) - 2:07

== Personnel ==
The Noisemakers

- Bruce Hornsby – vocals, acoustic piano, keyboards, dulcimer
- John "J. T." Thomas – keyboards, organ, guitars
- Doug Derryberry – guitars
- J. V. Collier – bass
- Sonny Emory – drums
- Bobby Read – reeds

Guest musicians

- Keefus Ciancia – new sounds (7)
- Blake Mills – guitars (1, 3, 9, 10, 12)
- R. S. Hornsby – guitar solo (4)
- Eric Clapton – guitar solo (9)
- Andy Leftwich – fiddle (1)
- Floyd Hill Jr. – vocals (1, 2)
- Eric Jackson – vocals (2)
- Tim Smith – vocals (2)
- Z Berg – vocals (6)
- 12-year-old Keith and Russell Hornsby – vocals and rap (9)

== Production ==
- Bruce Hornsby – producer
- Tony Berg – producer
- Wayne Pooley – producer (7), engineer, mixing
- Shawn Everett – engineer, mixing
- Stephen Marcussen – mastering at Marcussen Mastering (Hollywood, California)
- Patti Oates Martin – production assistant
- Moonie Geiger – production attendant
- Leonard Grapple – production attendant
- Evelyn Morgan – A&R administrator
- Lisa Hansen – release coordinator
- Andy Kman – release coordinator
- John Newcott – release coordinator
- Hollis King – art direction
- Sachico Asano – graphic design
- Kathy Hornsby – cover art
- Katherine Fisher – photography
- Sean Smith – photography
- Carey Wilheim – photography
- John Scher for Metropolitan Talent Management – management

Road crew

- Reggie Bankstown
- Peter Banta
- Caldwell Gray
- Chuck Keith
- Wayne Pooley

== Charts ==
Chart (2009)	Peak position
US Billboard 200	116
US Top Rock Albums (Billboard)	47
