= Hot House (Bruce Hornsby album) =

Studio album by Bruce Hornsby
- Released: July 18, 1995
- Recorded: Bruce Hornsby's House Virginia, Club Front Marin County, California, Soundmasters Los Angeles, California
- Genre: Jazz rock
- Length: 59:11
- Label: RCA
- Producer: Bruce Hornsby

Bruce Hornsby chronology
Harbor Lights (1993)	Hot House (1995)	Spirit Trail (1998)

Professional ratings
Review scores
Source	Rating
Allmusic	3.5/5 stars

Hot House is a 1995 album by American musician Bruce Hornsby. It is Hornsby's second solo album and his fifth overall studio release (three previously with The Range). "Walk in the Sun" and "Cruise Control", from the album, were released as singles (with radio edits).

The album's cover art, featuring an imagined jam session between bluegrass legend Bill Monroe and jazz legend Charlie Parker, served as an apt metaphor for the rich fusion of musical styles Hornsby was developing and expanding.

The album found Hornsby expanding upon the foray into jazz sound from Harbor Lights, this time reintroducing elements of bluegrass from A Night On The Town and his earlier collaborations. Much like the socially conscious lyrics of his earlier work, the underlying messages behind the catchy tunes are often very dark, such as on "Country Doctor", "Hot House Ball" and "White Wheeled Limousine", where story-telling lyrics build around spousal murder, nuclear disaster, and wedding-day adultery, respectively.

The album featured many of Harbor Lights' guests, such as Pat Metheny and Jimmy Haslip. Béla Fleck also collaborates again on banjo. The album's closing track, "Cruise Control," is the last Hornsby song on which Jerry Garcia played guitar; at a concert he performed in Buffalo, New York, in August 2008 on the anniversary of Garcia's death, Hornsby said Garcia had wanted to play on "Country Doctor", but was given an easier tune to play because of his poor health.

"White Wheeled Limousine" had debuted five years earlier as an encore to Branford Marsalis's opening act for the Grateful Dead's New Year's Concert on December 31, 1990, when Marsalis and Rob Wasserman joined Hornsby in the performance. The Hot House version of "White Wheeled Limousine" pairs Pat Metheny's guitar with Fleck's banjo for a blisteringly intricate call-and-response alongside Hornsby's piano runs. Hot House also makes an homage to Hornsby's years with the Dead via his recasting of the chorus/bridge of the Dead's song "Estimated Prophet" as the newly lyricized Hornsby tune "Tango King." The album also boasts a more prominent role for Harbor Lights alum John D'earth on trumpet and introduces Bobby Read on woodwinds and J. V. Collier on bass. Read and Collier continue to perform with Hornsby.

== Track listing ==
All songs written by Bruce Hornsby.

1. "Spider Fingers" – 6:44
2. "White Wheeled Limousine" – 5:28
3. "Walk in the Sun" – 4:58
4. "The Changes" – 5:49
5. "The Tango King" – 5:48
6. "Big Rumble" – 4:40
7. "Country Doctor" – 5:57
8. "The Longest Night" – 5:22
9. "Hot House Ball" – 4:41
10. "Swing Street" – 4:36
11. "Cruise Control" – 5:03

== Personnel ==
- Bruce Hornsby – vocals, grand piano, synthesizers, accordion
- J.T. Thomas – organ
- J. V. Collier – bass (1, 6, 10)
- Jimmy Haslip – bass (2–5, 7–9)
- John Molo – drums
- Ornette Fogelberg – tambourine
- Bobby Read – alto saxophone, tenor saxophone
- John D'Earth – trumpet
- Debbie Henry – backing vocals

Additional personnel, by track

2. "White Wheeled Limousine"

- Béla Fleck – banjo
- Debbie Henry – lead vocal
- Pat Metheny – guitar

3. "Walk In The Sun"

- David Hollister – backing vocals
- Levi Little – backing vocals
- Pat Metheny – guitar
- John Paris – programming
- Robert Brookins – programming

4. "The Changes"

- Pat Metheny – guitar

6. "Big Rumble"

- Joe White – lead vocals
- Glenn Wilson – baritone saxophone

7. "Country Doctor"

- Derwin "Stump" Cox – percussion
- Randy Jacobs – melody guitar
- Chaka Khan – backing vocals
- Pat Metheny – guitar solos
- Larry "Egg" Sears – percussion

8. "The Longest Night"

- Randy Jacobs – rhythm guitar
- Pat Metheny – sitar
- Louis Price – backing vocals
- John Paris – programming
- Robert Brookins – programming

10. "Swing Street"

- David Hollister – backing vocals
- Levi Little – backing vocals
- Stephen Lipson – programming

11. "Cruise Control"

- Jerry Garcia – lead guitar
- David Hollister – backing vocals
- Levi Little – backing vocals
- Randy Jacobs – rhythm guitar

== Production ==
- Bruce Hornsby – producer, additional mixing
- Wayne Pooley – engineer, mixing
- J.T. Thomas – mixing
- Brad Madix – second engineer
- Keno "Keanu" Snyder – second engineer
- John Cutler – additional engineer
- Tom Mahn – additional engineer
- Heff Moraes – additional engineer
- Jeff "Nik" Norman – additional engineer
- John Molo – additional mixing
- Bobby Read – additional mixing
- Ted Jensen – mastering at Sterling Sound (New York City, New York)
- Melissa Reagan – production assistant
- Kathy Hornsby – production coordinator, all other photography
- Amanda Armstrong – RCA liaison
- Sherry Rettig – RCA liaison
- Ria Lewerke – art direction, design
- Norman Miller – art direction, design
- Gary Kelly – cover illustration
- William Claxton – back cover photography
- Leo Schatzel – piano and tuning service
- Steve Parish – guitar technician for Jerry Garcia
- Carolyn Chrzan – guitar technician for Pat Methany
- Q-Prime, Inc. – management
