= Indigo Park =

Studio album by Bruce Hornsby
- Released: April 3, 2026
- Studios: Sound City Studios (Los Angeles); The Large Clothed-Eared Collider (Williamsburg, Virginia)
- Length: 43:18
- Labels: Zappo Productions; Thirty Tigers
- Producers: Bruce Hornsby; Tony Berg; Will Maclellan

Bruce Hornsby chronology
Deep Sea Vents (2024)	Indigo Park (2026)

Indigo Park is an album by the American singer-songwriter Bruce Hornsby. It was released on April 3, 2026, by Zappo Productions with distribution helmed by Thirty Tigers. The album was co-produced by Hornsby, Tony Berg, and Will Maclellan, and recorded at Sound City Studios in Los Angeles and The Large Clothed-Eared Collider in Williamsburg, Virginia.

== Background ==
Hornsby began work on the album in 2024 following an experience of burnout in which he initially intended to take a break from writing before reversing course. The album's title and cover artwork were announced on January 20, 2026; additionally, Hornsby supported the album with a tour which ran from February to April 2026.

== Composition ==
In press releases relating to the album, Hornsby was quoted as saying that the album's songs "oscillate between extremes—light and dark, memory and fantasy, calm and rage, doubt and certainty."

== Promotion ==
The album's lead single, the album's title track, was released on February 4, 2026 in tandem with the unveiling of the album's full track listing. The album's second single, "Ecstatic" (featuring Bonnie Raitt), was released on March 4, 2026. A music video for the song was released the same day; it features appearances from members of the Louisiana State University Tigers women's basketball team.

== Track listing ==
All tracks are written by Bruce Hornsby; "Alabama" and "Might as Well Be Me, Florinda" written with Robert Hunter.

Indigo Park track listing
No.	Title	Length
1.	"Indigo Park"	4:57
2.	"Memory Palace" (featuring Ezra Koenig)	2:52
3.	"Entropy Here (Rust in Peace)"	3:32
4.	"Silhouette Shadows"	5:43
5.	"Ecstatic" (featuring Bonnie Raitt)	2:51
6.	"Alabama"	3:46
7.	"North Dakota State Roof"	4:38
8.	"Sliver of Time"	3:54
9.	"Might as Well Be Me, Florinda" (with Bob Weir and Blake Mills)	7:12
10.	"Take a Light Strain"	3:53
Total length:		43:18

== Personnel ==
Credits and personnel for Indigo Park adapted from the album's liner notes and Tidal.

=== Musicians ===
- Bruce Hornsby - vocals, composition, piano (all tracks)
- Ezra Koenig - vocals (2)
- Bonnie Raitt - vocals (5)
- Bob Weir - vocals (9)
- Blake Mills - vocals (9)

=== Technical and visuals ===
- Bruce Hornsby - production
- Tony Berg - production
- Will Maclellan - production
- Brian Lee - mastering, mastering engineering, mixing
- Bob Jackson - mastering, mixing
- Wayne Pooling - recording, engineering
- Ariel Rechtshaid - engineering on "Memory Palace"
- Joel Jaffe - additional engineering on "Ecstatic"
- Eric Corson - horn recording on "Might as Well Be Me, Florinda"
- Scott Gordon - recording programming on "Might as Well Be Me, Florinda"
- Brandon Duncan - recording assistance
- Sebastian Basti - recording assistance
- Baz Reunert - recording assistance
- Sebastian Cabot - recording assistance
- Edward Hopper - cover artwork
- Marc Finkelstein - photography

== Charts ==
Chart performance for Indigo Park
Chart (2026)	Peak position
UK Albums Sales (OCC)	91
UK Americana Albums (Official Charts)	14
UK Independent Albums (Official Charts)	39
