= Spirit Trail =

Studio album by Bruce Hornsby
- Released: October 13, 1998
- Studio: Bruce Hornsby's house (Williamsburg, Virginia); Kingsway Studios (New Orleans, Louisiana); The Cutting Room and 12th Street Studio (New York City, New York)
- Genre: Rock; Jazz; Bluegrass
- Length: 90:29
- Label: RCA
- Producer: Bruce Hornsby / Michael Mangini and Hornsby (tracks 3 and 14)

Bruce Hornsby chronology
Hot House (1995)	Spirit Trail (1998)	Here Come The Noise Makers (2000)

Professional ratings
Review scores
Source	Rating
Allmusic	2.5/5 stars

Spirit Trail is the sixth studio album by American pianist and singer Bruce Hornsby, released by RCA Records as a double CD in 1998. The cover artwork depicts Hornsby's uncle, Charles Hornsby.

The album blended instrumental tracks with the story-telling, rock, jazz, and other musical forms Hornsby had delved into over his career. Over the two discs, Hornsby wove a tapestry of varied textures, from the fervent spirituality and almost gospel dirge of "Preacher in the Ring, parts I & II," to the catchy chord progressions of "Sad Moon."

Spirit Trail has been often mentioned to be one of Bruce Hornsby's best albums. Several tracks, notably "Fortunate Son", have since become fan favorites and staples at Hornsby's concerts.

Among other homages, the song "Sunflower Cat (Some Dour Cat) (Down With That)" sampled and looped the main lick from the Grateful Dead song "China Cat Sunflower." Spirit Trail considered "very Southern" themes with "songs about race, religion, judgment and tolerance" and "struggles with these issues"—notably on "Sneaking Up on Boo Radley," which references the character from Harper Lee's Pulitzer Prize-winning novel To Kill a Mockingbird.

== Track listing ==
All songs by Bruce Hornsby, except where noted.

Disc 1
No.	Title	Writer(s)	Length
1.	"King of the Hill"		6:17
2.	"Resting Place"		4:44
3.	"Preacher in the Ring, Part I"		5:02
4.	"Preacher in the Ring, Part II"		4:46
5.	"Song C"		2:46
6.	"Sad Moon"		6:33
7.	"Pete and Manny"	Hornsby, John Hornsby	3:14
8.	"Fortunate Son"		4:14
9.	"Sneaking Up on Boo Radley"		5:15
10.	"Great Divide"		5:01

Disc 2
No.	Title	Writer(s)	Length
1.	"Line in the Dust"		4:42
2.	"See the Same Way"		5:36
3.	"Shadow Hand"		4:16
4.	"Sunlight Moon"	Hornsby, Keith Hornsby, Michael Mangini, Russell Hornsby	4:20
5.	"Listen to the Silence"		4:34
6.	"Funhouse"		4:22
7.	"Sunflower Cat (Some Dour Cat) (Down With That)"	Hornsby, Jerry Garcia, Michael Mangini, Robert Hunter	3:55
8.	"Song D"		2:03
9.	"Swan Song"		4:56
10.	"Variations on Swan Song and Song D"		3:53

Lost and Found on the Spirit Trail (25th Anniversary Edition)
No.	Title	Length
1.	"Living In The Sunshine"	6:04
2.	"Groove Infatuation"	3:49
3.	"Evening Sun"	4:37
4.	"Clown's Tambourine"	6:17

Live Trail (25th Anniversary Edition)
No.	Title	Length
1.	"King Of The Hill"	6:42
2.	"Resting Place (Boulder, CO 8/17/19)"	11:22
3.	"Preacher In The Ring, Pt. 1 / Variation II (Webern) / Catenaires (Carter)"	8:11
4.	"Fortunate Son"	5:14
5.	"Sneaking Up On Boo Radley"	5:38
6.	"See The Same Way"	6:50
7.	"Shadow Hand"	4:55
8.	"Funhouse"	7:39
9.	"Sunflower Cat (Some Dour Cat) (Down With That) (Dillon, CO 8/19/19)"	7:50
10.	"Swan Song (taken from Bride Of The Noisemakers)"	6:12

In territories other than the US, the album was released as a single disc, omitting the tracks "Sunlight Moon", "Listen To The Silence" and "Funhouse", and with a different running order.

No.	Title	Writer(s)	Length
1.	"Line in the Dust"		4:42
2.	"See the Same Way"		5:36
3.	"Shadow Hand"		4:16
4.	"King of the Hill"		6:17
5.	"Resting Place"		4:44
6.	"Preacher in the Ring, Part I"		5:02
7.	"Preacher in the Ring, Part II"		4:46
8.	"Song C"		2:46
9.	"Sad Moon"		6:33
10.	"Pete and Manny"	Hornsby, John Hornsby	3:14
11.	"Fortunate Son"		4:14
12.	"Sneaking up on Boo Radley"		5:15
13.	"Great Divide"		5:01
14.	"Sunflower Cat (Some Dour Cat) (Down With That)"	Hornsby, Jerry Garcia, Michael Mangini, Robert Hunter	3:55
15.	"Song D"		2:03
16.	"Swan Song"		4:56
17.	"Variations on Swan Song and Song D"		3:53

== Musicians ==
- Bruce Hornsby – vocals, bass vocals, grand piano, Wurlitzer electric piano, Korg Wavestation, Casio keyboards, Minimoog, dulcimer, organ (7, 13)
- J.T. Thomas – organ
- John Leventhal – guitars, bouzouki
- David Bendeth – guitar
- Adam Larrabee – guitar
- Michael Mangini – guitar
- Wayne Pooley – guitar
- Matt Scannell – guitar, mandolin
- Jerry Garcia, on guitar, is sampled, posthumously, on Disc 2, track 7.
- J. V. Collier – bass
- Skoti Alain Elliott – bass
- John Pierce – bass
- Matt Chamberlain – drums, percussion
- John Molo – drums, percussion
- Shawn Pelton – drums, percussion
- Bobby Hornsby – shaker
- Ernesto Laboy – congas
- Bobby Read – clarinet, flute, saxophones
- Tim Streagle – trombone
- John D'Earth – trumpet
- Ashley MacIsaac – violin
- David Mansfield – violin
- Colette Coward – backing vocals
- Kyle Davis – backing vocals
- Debbie Henry – backing vocals
- Joe Lee – backing vocals

== Production ==
- David Bendeth – A&R
- Bruce Hornsby – producer, art direction, design
- Michael Mangini – producer (3, 14)
- Dennis Herring – additional production (4, 6)
- Wayne Pooley – engineer (1, 2, 4–13, 15–17), mixing (1–13, 15–17)
- Skoti Alain Elliot – engineer (3, 14), mixing (14)
- Mark Needham – engineer (4–7, 11, 12)
- Sharon Kearney – second engineer (3, 14)
- Serban Ghenea – additional programming, additional mixing
- Tom Coyne – mastering at Sterling Sound (New York City, New York)
- Leo Schatzel – piano tuning and service
- Melissa Reagan – production assistant
- Angel Barnard – production coordinator
- Laurie Marks – production coordinator
- Sue Tropio – production coordinator
- Kim Biggs – art direction, design
- Danny Clinch – photography
- Carey Wilhelm – live photography
- Ann Hornsby – photo of Bobby Hornsby
- Chip DeMatteo – liner notes
- Q-Prime, Inc. – management
