= Jacob's Ladder (Huey Lewis and the News song) =

1987 single by Huey Lewis and the News

Single by Huey Lewis and the News

from the album Fore!
- B-side: "The Heart of Rock & Roll" (live)
- Released: January 1987
- Genre: Rock
- Length: 3:33
- Label: Chrysalis
- Songwriters: Bruce Hornsby; John Hornsby
- Producers: Huey Lewis and the News

Huey Lewis and the News singles chronology
"Hip to Be Square" (1986)	"Jacob's Ladder" (1987)	"I Know What I Like" (1987)

"Jacob's Ladder" is a song written by Bruce Hornsby and his brother John Hornsby first recorded by American rock band Huey Lewis and the News. The song spent one week at No. 1 on the US Billboard Hot 100 chart in 1987, becoming the band's third and final number-one hit.

== Writing and recording ==
Set in Birmingham, Alabama, the song marries the Biblical image of Jacob's Ladder to someone who rejects proselytizing evangelists (first, an obese street preacher, followed by a televangelist claiming to need money or be forced off the airwaves) and is instead struggling to get through life one day at a time:

Step by step, one by one, higher and higher
Step by step, rung by rung, climbing Jacob's ladder.

The song was originally meant for Hornsby's debut album, The Way It Is, which Lewis was co-producing. Hornsby gave the song to Lewis and it appeared on the group's 1986 album Fore!. It was the third single released from the album, and topped the Billboard Hot 100 chart for a week in March 1987.

== Critical reception ==
Billboard magazine wrote that the song is "insightful" and "wrestles with spiritual issues." Cash Box praised the "soaring chorus" and "powerful arrangement."

== Music video ==
A music video of the band performing the song live was filmed during their concert at the Oakland Coliseum on December 31, 1986.

== Later versions ==
Bruce Hornsby later recorded his own rendition of the song for his 1988 album, Scenes from the Southside, although it had already become part of his concert repertoire since 1986. A bluegrass-influenced live version (very different from the version on Scenes from the Southside) appears on the 2006 album Intersections (1985–2005), which Hornsby performed with his brother John.

== Charts ==
=== Weekly charts ===
Chart (1987)	Peak position
Australia (Kent Music Report)	48
Canada Top Singles (RPM)	16
Canada Adult Contemporary (RPM)	2
Canada Retail Singles (The Record)	27
Israel (IBA)	22
New Zealand (Recorded Music NZ)	50
US Billboard Hot 100	1
US Adult Contemporary (Billboard)	17
US Mainstream Rock Airplay (Billboard)	10
West Germany (GfK)	65

=== Year-end charts ===
Chart (1987)	Position
US Billboard Hot 100	41

== See also ==
- List of Billboard Hot 100 number ones of 1987
