= Bruce Hornsby =

American musician (born 1954)

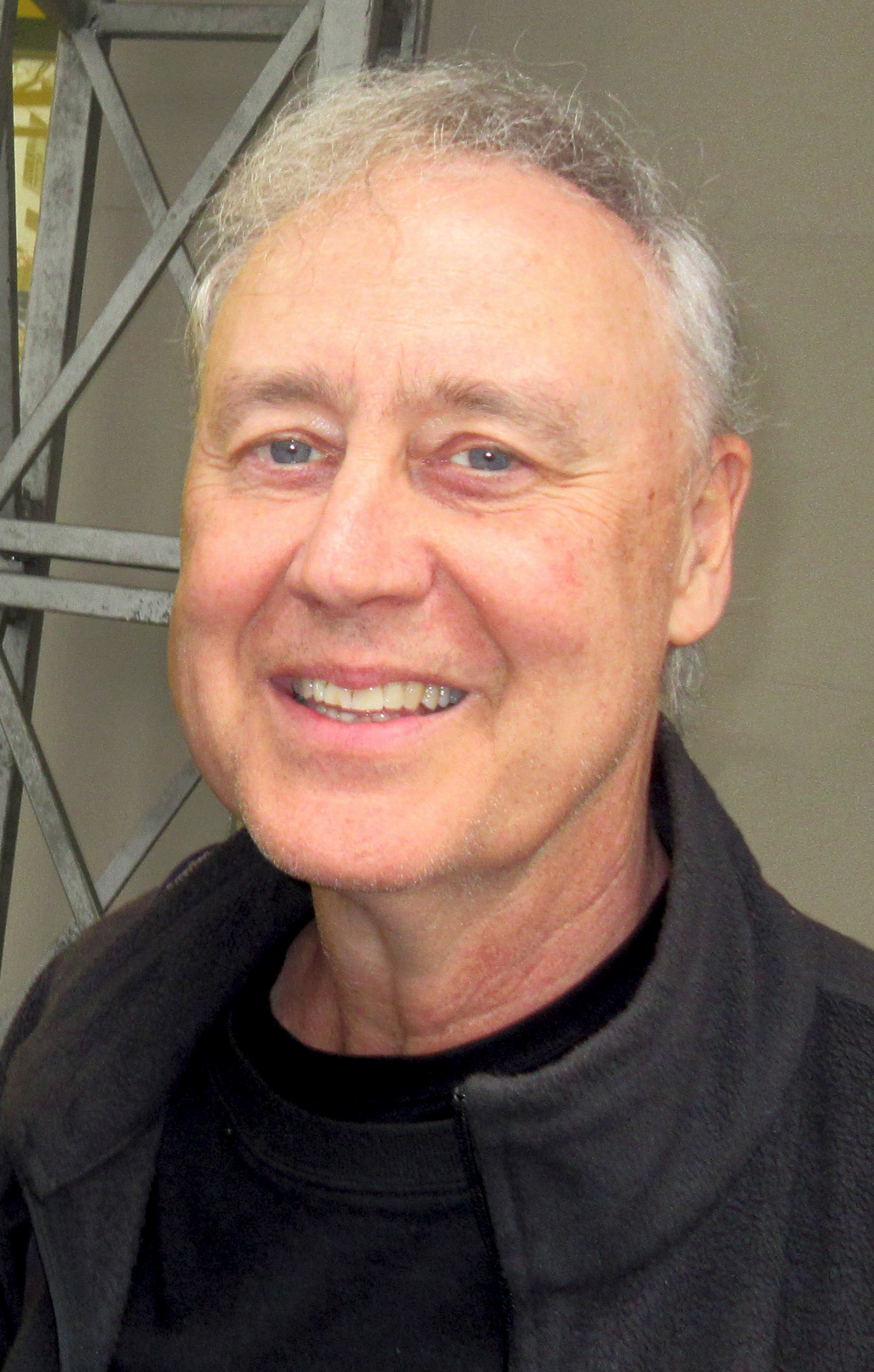
- Hornsby in 2019

Background information
- Born: Bruce Randall Hornsby; November 23, 1954 (age 71); Williamsburg, Virginia, U.S.
- Genres: Soft rock; gospel; heartland rock; jazz; bluegrass; blues rock
- Occupations: Singer; musician
- Instruments: Vocals; piano; keyboards; dulcimer; accordion
- Years active: 1974–present
- Labels: RCA; CBS/Sony; Sony BMG; Vanguard; Sire
- Spouse: Kathy Yankovich (m. 1983)
- Website: brucehornsby.com

Bruce Randall Hornsby (born November 23, 1954) is an American singer-songwriter and pianist. His music draws from a wide range of traditions – folk, jazz, modern classical, bluegrass, rock, and jam band styles.

Hornsby has won three Grammy Awards: a 1987 Grammy Award for Best New Artist with Bruce Hornsby and the Range, a 1990 Grammy Award for Best Bluegrass Recording, and a 1994 Grammy Award for Best Pop Instrumental Performance.

Hornsby has worked with his touring band Bruce Hornsby and the Noisemakers, his bluegrass project with Ricky Skaggs, and as a session and guest musician. He was a touring member of the Grateful Dead from September 1990 through March 1992, playing over 100 shows with the band.

== Early life and education ==
Bruce Randall Hornsby was born in Williamsburg, Virginia, to Robert Stanley Hornsby (1920–1998), an attorney, real-estate developer and former musician, and Lois Hornsby (née Saunier), a piano player and church community liaison who had a local middle school named after her. He has two brothers, Robert Saunier "Bobby" Hornsby, a realtor with Hornsby Realty and locally known musician, and John Hornsby, a lawyer, with whom he has collaborated in songwriting. They are cousins of actor David Hornsby. While raised in the church of Christian Science, Hornsby went to doctors and dentists as needed. He had a politically liberal upbringing.

Hornsby graduated from James Blair High School in Williamsburg in 1973, where he played on the basketball team and was chosen by his senior class as most likely to succeed.

Hornsby studied music at the University of Richmond for a year, at the Berklee College of Music for two semesters, and then at the University of Miami, where he graduated in 1977.

== Career ==
In 1974, Hornsby's older brother Bobby, who attended the University of Virginia, formed the band "Bobby Hi-Test and the Octane Kids" to play fraternity parties, featuring Bruce on Fender Rhodes and vocals. The band, which is listed in Skeleton Key: A Dictionary for Deadheads, performed covers of the Allman Brothers Band, the Band, and predominantly Grateful Dead songs.

Bobby Hornsby's son, Robert Saunier Hornsby, was a recurring guest-guitarist with Hornsby's band and periodically toured with his uncle and played on his records until his death on January 15, 2009, in a car accident near Crozet, Virginia at age 28.

Following his graduation from the University of Miami in 1977, Hornsby returned to his hometown of Williamsburg, and played in local clubs and hotel bars. In 1980, he and his younger brother and songwriting partner John Hornsby moved to Los Angeles, where they spent three years writing for 20th Century Fox. Before moving back to his native Hampton Roads, he also spent time in Los Angeles as a session musician. There, Hornsby became friends with members of Ambrosia and later he and Ambrosia bassist Joe Puerta performed as members of the touring band for Sheena Easton. In 1984, Hornsby appeared in the music video for Easton's singles "Strut" and “Sugar Walls".

Hornsby made a solo demo recording of “Mandolin Rain,” “The Way It Is,” and “The Red Plains” which led to him being signed by RCA in 1985.

=== The Range ===
Bruce Hornsby and the Range
- Bruce Hornsby and the Range, 1990, L-R: George Marinelli, Bruce Hornsby, John Molo, Joe Puerta

Background information
- Origin: Los Angeles, California; Williamsburg, Virginia, United States
- Genres: Rock, pop rock, soft rock
- Years active: 1984–1991
- Label: RCA Records
- Past members: Bruce Hornsby; David Mansfield; George Marinelli; Joe Puerta; John Molo

In 1984, Hornsby formed Bruce Hornsby and the Range, who were signed to RCA Records in 1985. Besides Hornsby, Range members were David Mansfield (guitar, mandolin, violin), George Marinelli (guitars and backing vocals), former Ambrosia member Joe Puerta (bass guitar and backing vocals), and John Molo (drums).

"The Way It Is" (1986)
The song's discussion of the troubled economy and race relations resonated with the American public and it remains Hornsby's best known song.

Hornsby's recording career started with the biggest hit he has had to date, "The Way It Is". It reached number one on the Billboard Hot 100 in December 1986. The song described aspects of homelessness, the American civil rights movement and institutional racism. It has since been sampled by at least six rap artists, including Tupac Shakur, E-40, and Mase.

With the success of the single, the album The Way It Is received the RIAA certification of multi-platinum. It included "Mandolin Rain" (co-written, as many of Hornsby's early songs were, with his brother John), another top-five hit. "Every Little Kiss" peaked at number 14 on the Billboard Hot 100 in July 1987. Other tracks on the album helped establish what some labeled the "Virginia sound", a mixture of rock, jazz, and bluegrass. Bruce Hornsby and the Range won the Grammy Award for Best New Artist in 1987, defeating Glass Tiger, Nu Shooz, Simply Red, and Timbuk3.

Hornsby and the Range's sound was distinctive for its use of syncopation in Hornsby's piano solos, a bright piano sound and an extensive use of synthesizers as background for Hornsby's solos, and on all the hits, a Linn drum machine and Oberheim OB-X for bass. They are typical double-time beats, which allowed Hornsby and the rest of the band to do more with their solos.

Bruce Hornsby timeline
1984–1991	Bruce Hornsby and the Range
1990–1992	Grateful Dead
1993–1995	Solo Albums: Harbor Lights & Hot House
1996–1998	Furthur Festivals & The Other Ones, Solo Album: Spirit Trail
1998–present	Bruce Hornsby and the Noise Makers
2007–present	Ricky Skaggs & Bruce Hornsby
2007–2025	The Bruce Hornsby Trio (with Christian McBride & Jack DeJohnette)

Hornsby and the Range's second album, Scenes from the Southside (on which Peter Harris replaced Mansfield), was released in 1988. It included "Look Out Any Window" and "The Valley Road" which many critics noted for their "more spacious" musical arrangements, allowing for "more expressive" piano solos from Hornsby. It also included "Jacob's Ladder", which the Hornsby brothers wrote for musician friend Huey Lewis; Lewis's version became a number one hit from his album Fore!. Scenes offered further slices of "Americana" and "small-town nostalgia".

During the late 1980s and early 1990s, Hornsby worked extensively as a producer and sideman, producing a comeback album Anything Can Happen for Leon Russell. In 1987, Hornsby collaborated with Irish group Clannad, playing and lending vocals to their single "Something to Believe In". Hornsby also appears on the official music video release for the track. In 1989, Hornsby co-wrote and played piano on Don Henley's hit "The End of the Innocence". In 1991, he played piano on Bonnie Raitt's hit "I Can't Make You Love Me". He also appeared on albums by Bob Dylan, Robbie Robertson, Crosby Stills and Nash, Stevie Nicks and Squeeze.

Hornsby slowly began to introduce jazz and bluegrass elements into his music, first in live performance settings and later on studio work. In 1989, he first performed at the Telluride Bluegrass Festival. He also reworked his hit "The Valley Road" with the Nitty Gritty Dirt Band for their album Will the Circle Be Unbroken: Volume Two. In February 1990, the song won Best Bluegrass Recording at the 32nd Annual Grammy Awards.

In May 1990, Hornsby released A Night on the Town, on which he teamed up with jazz musicians Wayne Shorter (tenor saxophone) and Charlie Haden (double bass) as well as bluegrass pioneer Bela Fleck (banjo). A change in style became apparent as the album was much more rock and guitar driven, making use of Jerry Garcia's guitar work on several tracks, including prominently on the single "Across the River".

In concert, Hornsby and the Range began to stretch out their songs, incorporating more and more "freewheeling musical exchanges". Critics praised the album for its production, its political relevance, and Hornsby's gestures toward expanding out of a strictly pop sound by incorporating jazz and bluegrass. Ultimately, though, the core "rock band" sound of the Range limited Hornsby's aspirations, and after a final three-week tour in 1991, Hornsby disbanded the Range to enter a new phase of his career. Drummer John Molo continued to perform regularly with Hornsby for another few years, although other members pursued separate musical endeavors. Following Hornsby's and Molo's involvement with the Other Ones, Molo left Hornsby to become the primary drummer with bass guitarist Phil Lesh and Friends.

=== Grateful Dead ===
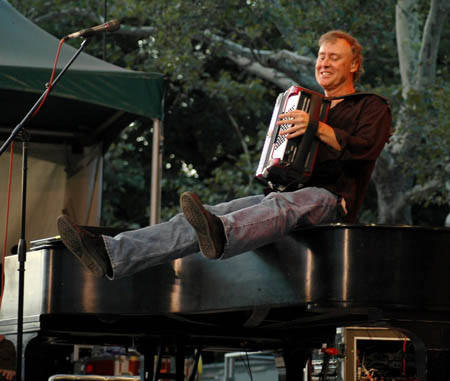
Hornsby playing accordion in Central Park in New York City

In 1988, Hornsby first appeared on stage with the Grateful Dead, a recurring collaboration that continued until the band's dissolution. Hornsby was a frequent guest before becoming a regular fixture in the touring lineup for the Grateful Dead a few years later.

From 1988 until Jerry Garcia's death in 1995, Hornsby played more than 100 shows with the Grateful Dead. At some shows in 1988 and 1989, he joined the band as a special guest and played accordion or synthesizer. Following the death of Grateful Dead keyboardist Brent Mydland in July 1990, Hornsby played piano (and frequently accordion) at many gigs. Mydland's place was filled in September 1990 by Vince Welnick, who became the sole keyboardist by March 1992, although Hornsby still sat in with the band on occasion.

Hornsby's own music evolved significantly during this time period. Critics have suggested that the Dead's tradition of melding folk music and the blues with psychedelic rock in "loose-knit expressions" and extended jamming "further pushed [Hornsby] outside the confines of mainstream pop". Critics have also commented upon the close musical connection formed between Hornsby and Jerry Garcia, suggesting that Hornsby's particular style of jazz-fueled improvisation added to the band's repertoire and helped to revitalize and refocus Garcia's guitar solos in the band's sound. Hornsby's friendship with Garcia continued, both inside and outside the band, as the two "challenged" each other to expand their musicianship through several other album and live collaborations. Above all, Hornsby's musical versatility and ability to slip in and out of extended free-form jams won over longtime Grateful Dead fans.

Since his first involvement with the Grateful Dead, Hornsby's live shows have drawn Deadheads and Hornsby has commented: "I've always liked the group of fans that we've drawn from the Grateful Dead time, because those fans are often adventurous music listeners." He has performed several of their songs at his concerts and as homages on studio and live albums, while Hornsby originals "The Valley Road" and "Stander on the Mountain" appeared several times in the Dead's setlists. Hornsby also co-performed the improvisation "Silver Apples of the Moon" for the Grateful Dead's Infrared Roses (1991).

Hornsby was the presenter when the Grateful Dead were inducted into the Rock and Roll Hall of Fame in 1994 and in 2005 he participated in "Comes a Time", a tribute concert to Jerry Garcia. He continues to work with Dead-related projects, such as Bob Weir's Ratdog and Mickey Hart's solo projects. He performed as part of the Other Ones in 1998 and 2000, and on occasion sat in with the Dead. Hornsby continues to be involved in the Grateful Dead and Furthur community. He played at the All Good Music Festival in 2012 with Weir on rhythm guitar. In mid-2013, Hornsby performed with Grateful Dead-influenced bluegrass group Railroad Earth. Hornsby reunited with surviving members of the Grateful Dead along with Trey Anastasio from Phish and Jeff Chimenti at Levi's Stadium in Santa Clara, California, and later at Soldier Field in July 2015.

=== Solo ===
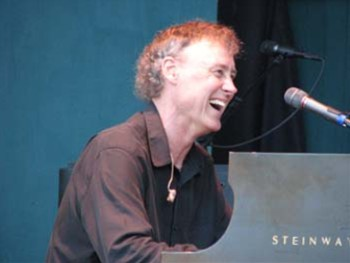
Hornsby in Portland, Oregon, 2006

Hornsby released his first solo album, Harbor Lights, in 1993. The record showcased him in a more jazz-oriented setting and featured a lineup that included Pat Metheny, Branford Marsalis, Jerry Garcia, Phil Collins and Bonnie Raitt. Hornsby secured his third Grammy in 1993 for Best Pop Instrumental for "Barcelona Mona" (composed with Branford Marsalis for the Barcelona Olympics).

In 1995, Hot House was released, its cover art featuring an imagined jam session between bluegrass musician Bill Monroe and jazz saxophonist Charlie Parker. Hornsby expanded into the jazz sound from Harbor Lights, this time reintroducing elements of bluegrass from A Night on the Town and his earlier collaborations. "Walk in the Sun" reached number 54 on the Billboard Hot 100.

"To be creative, spontaneous in the moment and make music in the present tense, that's what we're all about live. I write the songs, we make the records and then the records become a departure point, the basic blueprint, the basic arrangement. I'm fairly restless creatively. I was never a very good Top 40 band guy because I never liked to play the same thing every time. Too often songwriters approach their songs like museum pieces. I don't subscribe to that. I think of my songs as living beings that evolve and change and grow through the years."
—Bruce Hornsby

During this time period, "even his concerts conveyed a looser, more playful mood, and Hornsby began taking requests from the audience". Hornsby's concerts became "departure points" for his album compositions, which would be blended with and reworked into "lengthy spontaneous medleys". Both in terms of audience requests and in terms of spontaneous on-stage decisions, Hornsby's performances became opportunities for him to challenge himself by trying to "find a way to seamlessly thread these seemingly disparate elements together".

Hornsby next worked with several Grateful Dead reformation projects, including several Furthur Festivals and the Other Ones, which resulted in the release of a live album, The Strange Remain. As part of the Other Ones, Hornsby performed Grateful Dead tunes "Jack Straw" and "Sugaree" (which features Hornsby on lead vocal, in Jerry Garcia's absence), as well as Hornsby-originals "White-Wheeled Limousine" and "Rainbow's Cadillac".

In 1998, three years after Hot House, Hornsby released a double album, Spirit Trail. Featuring a picture of his uncle on the cover, the collection blended instrumental tracks with the story-telling, rock, jazz, and other musical forms Hornsby had delved into over his career. The album considered "very Southern" themes with "songs about race, religion, judgment and tolerance" and "struggles with these issues". An example is "Sneaking Up on Boo Radley", which references the character from Harper Lee's Pulitzer Prize-winning novel To Kill a Mockingbird.

Throughout the sequence of Harbor Lights, Hot House, and Spirit Trail, Hornsby's piano playing steadily gained further complexity, taking on a more varied array of musical styles and incorporating more difficult techniques, as evidenced by his two-hand-independence on Spirit Trail's "King of the Hill". During this same span of solo album years, Hornsby made several mini-tours playing solo piano gigs for the first time in his career. The shows allowed Hornsby additional possibilities for segueing songs into other songs, often blurring lines between classical compositions, jazz standards, traditional bluegrass, folk, and fiddle tunes, Grateful Dead songs, as well as reworkings of Hornsby originals. Hornsby reflected on these periods of intensive solo performances, stating that the solo tours helped him "recommit [himself] to the study of piano" and "take [his] playing to a whole new level", explorations and improvisations that would not be possible in a band setting.

In August 2014, Hornsby released his first entirely live solo album, Solo Concerts.

In April 2019, Hornsby's 21st album, Absolute Zero, was released. It features collaborations with Justin Vernon and Sean Carey of Bon Iver, Jack DeJohnette, Blake Mills, yMusic, the Staves, and Brad Cook.

=== The Noisemakers ===
Hornsby's touring band lineup underwent extensive changes between 1998 and 2000, with longtime drummer John Molo joining former Grateful Dead bassist Phil Lesh in his band Phil Lesh & Friends. A set of twenty consecutive shows performed by Hornsby and his band at Yoshi's Jazz Club in Oakland, California included much spontaneity and taking requests from the audience, a form that he continues at live shows to this day. As Hornsby experimented with a different sound, ushering in frequent collaborations with musicians such as Steve Kimock on guitar and Bobby Read on heavily effects-driven electronic woodwinds, a new band, dubbed the Noisemakers, took shape. In 2000, Hornsby chronicled this journey with a compilation live album entitled Here Come the Noise Makers, and did extensive touring with his new band featuring John "J.T." Thomas (keyboards, organ), Bobby Read (saxophones, woodwinds, flute), J.V. Collier (bass), Doug Derryberry (guitar, mandolin), and several different drummers before Sonny Emory took over full-time.

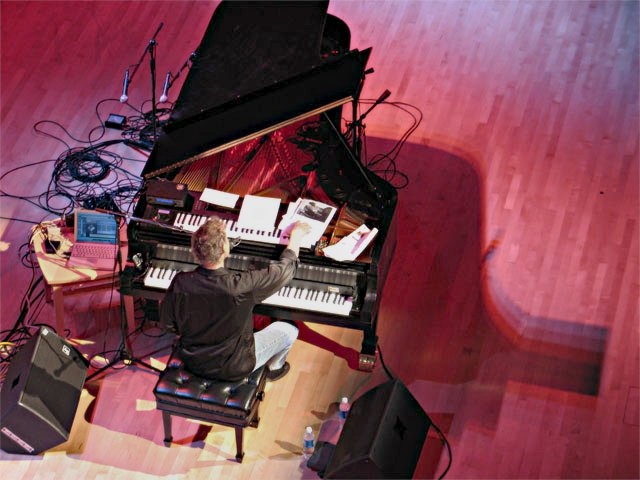
Hornsby performing a solo piano show June 21, 2005, in North Bethesda, Maryland, audience requests visible across keyboard

In 2002, Hornsby released Big Swing Face. The album was Hornsby's most experimental effort to date. It was the only album on which Hornsby barely plays any piano and relied heavily on post-electronica beats, drum loops, Pro Tools editing, and dense synthesizer arrangements. Big Swing Face received mixed reviews, ranging from "a new and improved Bruce Hornsby" to being called one of the "strangest records of 2002".

In 2004, after 19 years on RCA Records, Hornsby signed with Columbia Records and returned to a more acoustic, piano-driven sound on his debut album for Columbia, Halcyon Days, released in June 2004. Guests included Sting, Elton John and Eric Clapton.

In July 2006, Hornsby released a four-CD/DVD box set titled Intersections (1985–2005). The discs are thematically broken into three categories: "Top 90 Time", "Solo Piano, Tribute Records, Country-Bluegrass, Movie Scores", and "By Request (Favorites and Best Songs)". A full third of the music is previously unreleased; many familiar tracks are presented as unreleased live versions rather than the original studio recordings, and the majority of the remaining tracks are from single B-sides, collaborations or tribute albums, and movie soundtracks. One song, "Song H", a new composition, was nominated for Best Pop Instrumental in 2007 at the 49th Annual Grammy Awards.

In 2007, Hornsby began more regularly playing classical music: at a concert in St. Louis, Missouri, during Hornsby's improvisational session in "The Way It Is", he began playing J.S. Bach's Goldberg Variations along with the drums. In a different city, he played five straight Goldberg Variations over the drum intro of "Gonna Be Some Changes Made".

On September 15, 2009, Bruce Hornsby and the Noisemakers released their fourth album, Levitate; it included new solo material with several songs co-written with Chip DiMatteo for the Broadway play SCKBSTD.

In May 2011, the band released a live album, Bride of the Noisemakers.

On June 17, 2016, Bruce Hornsby and the Noisemakers released their sixth album and fourth studio album, Rehab Reunion. Hornsby only plays the dulcimer on the album and does not play piano. The album was also Hornsby's first release on 429 Records. Like many of his previous releases, Rehab Reunion features collaborations with guest artists. Justin Vernon of Bon Iver sings background vocals on "Over the Rise". Mavis Staples duets with Hornsby on "Celestial Railroad". Also noteworthy is a folk version of "The Valley Road", originally a hit in 1988 with Hornsby's first backing band, the Range.

=== Skaggs & Hornsby/The Bruce Hornsby Trio ===
In March 2007, Hornsby teamed with bluegrass player Ricky Skaggs to produce a bluegrass album, Ricky Skaggs & Bruce Hornsby, followed by a tour. In 2000, the pair had collaborated on "Darlin' Cory", a track on the Big Mon Bill Monroe bluegrass music. Ricky Skaggs & Bruce Hornsby, featuring the duo backed by Skaggs's band Kentucky Thunder, combined bluegrass, traditional country music, jazzy piano and a splash of humor on a spectrum of songs from the traditional to new compositions such as the opening track, "The Dreaded Spoon", a humorous tale of a youthful ice cream heist. The pair also reinvented Hornsby's hit "Mandolin Rain" as a minor key acoustic ballad and give his cautionary tale of backwoods violence, "A Night on the Town", a treatment highlighting the "Appalachian storytelling tradition that was always at the song's heart".

The album ended with a cover of Rick James's funk hit "Super Freak" in a bluegrass arrangement. The album peaked at number one on the Billboard Bluegrass Albums list; it was on the charts for 52 weeks. With the album, Hornsby disproved the notion that the piano is not compatible with "string-oriented" bluegrass. The duo released the live album Cluck Ol' Hen in September 2013.

Concurrently with the bluegrass project, Hornsby recorded a jazz album, Camp Meeting with Christian McBride (bass) and Jack DeJohnette (drums). Alongside original compositions by Hornsby, the trio delivered newly reharmonized versions of tunes by John Coltrane, Miles Davis, Thelonious Monk and Bud Powell, a previously unrecorded Ornette Coleman work ("Questions and Answers") and an early Keith Jarrett composition ("Death and the Flower"). The trio made a series of appearances in the summer of 2007, including the Playboy Jazz Festival, the Newport Jazz Festival and at the Hollywood Bowl.

On January 4, 2007, former Grateful Dead members Bob Weir, Bill Kreutzmann and Mickey Hart reunited along with Hornsby, Mike Gordon (of Phish and the Rhythm Devils) and Warren Haynes to play two sets, including Dead classics, at a post-inauguration fundraising party for Speaker of the United States House of Representatives Nancy Pelosi.

Hornsby wrote songs for SCKBSTD, a Broadway Musical; one song from this project, a playful biographical tune about real-estate tycoon Donald Trump titled "The Don of Dons", was played often at Hornsby's solo piano performances in early 2007. In 2009, he composed the score for Spike Lee's ESPN documentary, Kobe Doin' Work, about NBA star Kobe Bryant and his MVP season. He played himself in a cameo role in the Robin Williams film World's Greatest Dad, in which Williams' character is a Bruce Hornsby fan.

Hornsby invested in Williamsburg area radio station "The Tide" WTYD 92.3 FM. He has endowed the Bruce Hornsby Creative American Music Program at the Frost School of Music of University of Miami.

=== Album trilogy (2019–2022) ===
In 2019, Hornsby began a trilogy of albums developed from film cues he composed for director Spike Lee, comprising Absolute Zero (2019), Non-Secure Connection (2020), and 'Flicted (2022).

Absolute Zero features contributions from yMusic, Justin Vernon, Blake Mills, and Jack DeJohnette and marked a stylistic turn noted by critics. The track “Voyager One” was named among The New York Times best songs of 2019.

Non-Secure Connection followed in 2020 and again drew positive notices. The single “My Resolve,” a duet with James Mercer, was included in The New York Times list of the best songs of 2020.

Released in May 2022, 'Flicted completed the trilogy and includes collaborations with Ezra Koenig and Danielle Haim; contemporaneous coverage reiterated the trilogy’s basis in Hornsby’s film-cue writing for Lee.

=== BrhyM (with yMusic) and Deep Sea Vents (2024) ===
In March 2024, Hornsby and yMusic released Deep Sea Vents under the name BrhyM: a ten-song project developed largely during the pandemic with contributions from Branford Marsalis and Chad Wright. The record opened at No. 1 on ''Billboard'''s Classical Crossover Albums chart. Coverage spanned the UK and U.S., with a full ''New Statesman'' review and mention on a ''New York Times'' playlist.

== Additional collaborations ==
On July 10, 1990, Hornsby made a guest appearance with the Grateful Dead onstage at Carter-Finley Stadium in Raleigh, NC, playing accordion during portions of the first and second sets. Grateful Dead keyboardist Brent Mydland died just over two weeks later, and Hornsby was summoned as a temporary replacement. The Grateful Dead released this concert on YouTube in its entirety on July 10, 2020, the 30th anniversary of the performance.

On October 18, 1991, Hornsby joined Pink Floyd co-founder Roger Waters on stage at Auditorio de la Cartuja in Seville, Spain, playing keyboards and singing the choruses of "Comfortably Numb".

On September 6, 1995 at Oriole Park at Camden Yards in Baltimore, Hornsby and Branford Marsalis performed the national anthem before Cal Ripken Jr. played in his 2,131st consecutive game, breaking Lou Gehrig's all-time Major League Baseball record.

In 2014, Hornsby toured selected dates with Pat Metheny Unity Group.

In 2016, Hornsby performed on a track, "Black Muddy River", along with indie folk band (and Justin Vernon's former band) DeYarmond Edison on Day of the Dead, a Grateful Dead cover album, benefiting the Red Hot Organization, an international charity dedicated to raising funds and awareness for HIV and AIDS. Hornsby performed the song alongside Vernon that same year in Eau Claire, Wisconsin. Hornsby performed alongside Vernon at Coachella in 2017, performing he Henley-Hornsby song “The End Of The Innocence”, the performance also featured Jenny Lewis. In 2019, Hornsby co-wrote “U (Man Like)” for Bon Iver’s album *i,i* and also contributed piano and vocals to the track.

At Bonnaroo’s Virtual ROO-ALITY (24-26 September 2020), Hornsby presented a collaborative set with Polo G, whose 2020 song “Wishing for a Hero” (from The Goat) was inspired by Tupac Shakur’s “Changes” and interpolates elements of Hornsby’s “The Way It Is.”

Hornsby has composed and performed for many projects with filmmaker Spike Lee, including end-title songs for two films, Clockers (1995) with Chaka Khan and Bamboozled (2001). He contributed music for If God Is Willing and da Creek Don't Rise (2010), Old Boy (2013) and Chi-Raq (2015), and full film scores for Lee's Kobe Bryant documentary for ESPN: Kobe Doin' Work (2009), Red Hook Summer (2012), Da Sweet Blood of Jesus (2015), and Lee's film for the NBA 2K16 video game (2015). He scored Lee's Netflix production She's Gotta Have It (2017, 2019). Hornsby wrote and performed new music for Lee's film BlacKkKlansman (2018). in 1993, Lee directed the video for Hornsby's song "Talk Of The Town".

On July 3, 2023, Hornsby appeared with the Doobie Brothers in Portsmouth, Virginia during their extended 50th anniversary tour, where he performed on keyboards and soloed on several songs.

On December 9, 2023, Hornsby appeared with Goose in Hampton, Virginia during their Goosemas run, where he performed "The Way It Is" on keyboards.

== Equipment ==
Hornsby uses a Steinway & Sons concert grand piano. With the Range and up until 1995, he used a Baldwin concert grand piano. He currently uses a Korg M1 synthesizer. With the Range, Hornsby used an Oberheim OB-X synthesizer.

Hornsby selected ten Model B Steinway Grands to be featured in its Limited Edition Signature Piano Series, each one personalized with his signature. Hornsby owns three 9 ft (2.7 m) Model D Steinway Grands.

For his 2016 album Rehab Reunion, he played Appalachian dulcimer made by BlueLion.

== Personal life ==
Hornsby and his wife Kathy have twin sons, born in 1992: Russell, who ran for the Oregon Ducks track and field team at the University of Oregon, and Keith, who played Division I basketball for the University of North Carolina Asheville Bulldogs from 2011 to 2013, transferred to Louisiana State University and played for LSU from 2014 to 2016, followed by a brief professional basketball career. They were named after musicians Leon Russell and Keith Jarrett, respectively.

Hornsby is a regular basketball player and an avid fan of the sport. He can frequently be seen at college basketball games throughout Virginia.

== Awards and nominations ==
Award	Year	Nominee(s)	Category	Result	Ref.
ASCAP Pop Music Awards	1988	"The Way It Is"	Most Performed Songs	Won	
ASCAP Pop Music Awards	1990	"The End of the Innocence"	Most Performed Songs	Won	
ASCAP Pop Music Awards	1991	"The End of the Innocence"	Most Performed Songs	Won	
Grammy Awards	1987	Bruce Hornsby & the Range	Best New Artist	Won	
Grammy Awards	1990	"The Valley Road"	Best Bluegrass Recording	Won	
Grammy Awards	1990	"The End of the Innocence"	Song of the Year	Nominated	
Grammy Awards	1990	"The End of the Innocence"	Record of the Year	Nominated	
Grammy Awards	1991	"Across the River"	Best Pop Performance by a Duo or Group with Vocal	Nominated	
Grammy Awards	1994	"Barcelona Mona"	Best Pop Instrumental Performance	Won	
Grammy Awards	1995	"The Star Spangled Banner"	Best Pop Instrumental Performance	Nominated	
Grammy Awards	1996	"Song B"	Best Pop Instrumental Performance	Nominated	
Grammy Awards	1996	"Love Me Still"	Best Song Written for Visual Media	Nominated	
Grammy Awards	2000	"Song C"	Best Pop Instrumental Performance	Nominated	
Grammy Awards	2005	"Song F"	Best Pop Instrumental Performance	Nominated	
Grammy Awards	2007	"Song H"	Best Pop Instrumental Performance	Nominated	
Grammy Awards	2009	"Is This America?"	Best Country Instrumental Performance	Nominated	
MTV Video Music Awards	1987	"The Way It Is"	Best New Artist in a Video	Nominated	
Pollstar Concert Industry Awards	1987	Bruce Hornsby & the Range	Next Major Arena Headliner	Nominated	
Pollstar Concert Industry Awards	1988	Bruce Hornsby & the Range	Next Major Arena Headliner	Nominated	
Pollstar Concert Industry Awards	1988	Tour	Small Hall Tour Of The Year	Won	

== Discography ==
- The Way It Is (1986)
- Scenes from the Southside (1988)
- A Night on the Town (1990)
- Harbor Lights (1993)
- Hot House (1995)
- Spirit Trail (1998)
- Here Come the Noisemakers (2000) (live album)
- Big Swing Face (2002)
- Halcyon Days (2004)
- Greatest Radio Hits (2004) (compilation)
- Intersections (2006)
- Camp Meeting (2007)
- Ricky Skaggs & Bruce Hornsby (2007)
- Levitate (2009)
- Bride of the Noisemakers (2011) (live album)
- Red Hook Summer (2012)
- The Essential Bruce Hornsby (2015)
- Ricky Skaggs & Bruce Hornsby, Cluck Ol’ Hen (2013)
- Solo Concerts (2014) (live album)
- Rehab Reunion (2016)
- Absolute Zero (2019)
- Non-Secure Connection (2020)
- 'Flicted (2022)
- BrhyM, Deep Sea Vents (2024)
- Indigo Park (2026)
