= A Night on the Town (Bruce Hornsby album) =

Studio album by Bruce Hornsby and the Range
- Released: June 19, 1990
- Recorded: 1989–1990
- Studios: Record One (Los Angeles); Kingsound Studios (Hollywood); Larrabee Studios (North Hollywood); Chapel Studios (Los Angeles)
- Genres: Rock, soft rock
- Length: 55:07
- Label: RCA
- Producers: Don Gehman; Bruce Hornsby

Bruce Hornsby chronology
Scenes from the Southside (1988)	A Night on the Town (1990)	Harbor Lights (1993)

Professional ratings
Review scores
Source	Rating
AllMusic	4/5 stars
CD Review	7/10

A Night on the Town is the third and final studio album by Bruce Hornsby and the Range. Following albums would be credited to Hornsby alone. A Night on the Town features Hornsby's last significant hit single, "Across the River", which spent one week at the top of the Billboard Album Rock Tracks chart and peaked at number 18 on the Billboard Hot 100. Bruce Hornsby chose Laurelle Brooks as the female lead in the music video for "Across the River".

== Background ==
Following the conclusion of his tour promoting Scenes from the Southside, which spanned 123 shows over ten months, Hornsby returned to Williamsburg, Virginia, where he spent ten days in his attic attempting to write material for his third solo album. Hornsby was dissatisfied with the results, so he took a break by driving down U.S. Route 58 down to Cumberland Gap with the intention of clearing his head. From April-August 1989, Hornsby wrote 14 songs, including "Set Me in Motion", which according to Hornsby, was "about people who can't dance – like me." "Set Me in Motion" was ultimately included on the 1991 Backdraft soundtrack. In November 1989, the working title for Hornsby's album was Here Come the Noisemakers.

Hornsby, who described his first two studio releases as "solo records with sprinklings of the band here in there", wanted his third album to feature his band, The Range, to a greater extent. He described A Night on the Town as being "harder, more immediate and aggressive – how people say we sound live." To that end, the piano playing that had been heavily featured on Hornsby's first two releases was made less prominent, and in some cases such as "Barren Ground", entirely absent. Hornsby selected Don Gehman to produce A Night on the Town, which Hornsby said resulted in a positive working environment.

== Songs ==
Hornsby wrote the title track about an event that occurred at a restaurant located near Williamsburg, Virginia called the Midway Diner. Commenting on the title track, Hornsby said that "it's just a song saying that these people are just doing what they were always told to do and what they were taught. It follows up a tradition – we beat up these guys because our fathers beat up these guys." The title track received airplay on over 100 Album-oriented rock radio stations across the United States and peaked at No. 4 on the Billboard Album Rock Tracks chart.

Hornsby wrote "Lost Soul" with his cousin Eddie in mind; Hornsby said that the song was "too personal and hard-hitting to my family" to discuss it any further. He sang "Lost Soul" as a duet with Shawn Colvin after reaching the conclusion that the vocal range was too high for Emmylou Harris. Hornsby wrote "Fire on the Cross" about the Ku Klux Klan, saying that it was "certainly not a light-hearted song". He commented that Wayne Shorter's saxophone playing on "Fire on the Cross" was meant to evoke "the angry cry against Klan violence".

"Stander on the Mountain" was written about a basketball player reminiscing about their old games at a reunion, with its instrumentation including an acoustic bass melody played by Charlie Haden. Hornsby compared the Haden's bass playing on bridge and ending of "Stander on the Mountain" to Haden's work with Keith Jarrett, adding that "It was always one of my fantasies to play that groove with Charlie on a record and have that very distinctive acoustic-bass style of his playing behind the piano."

Bruce Hornby's brother John Hornsby wrote all of the lyrics to "Stranded on Easy Street". According to Bruce, John based the song on his personal experiences. "Another Day" was tracked live in one take by Hornsby's backing band before they had fully familiarized themselves with the arrangement. Hornsby called out cues to provide his band with more context on what to play, including the phrase "Let it ring George", which indicated that he wanted a guitar solo. "Carry the Water" was recorded after Bruce Springsteen told Hornsby that the album needed a song with prominent piano playing.

== Critical reception ==
Billboard believed that A Night on the Town was "much more focused and tighter than 1988's Scenes from the Southside", Hornsby's previous studio album. They found that the album continued in the tradition of Bruce Hornsby and the Range's previous albums with "thoughtful lyrics around gentle and skillful melodies", albeit with "a harder edge".

Writing for Entertainment Weekly, Greg Sandow thought that the album carried a grittier and more rock oriented sound, saying that "Hornsby has been known to play more assertive rock in his concerts, and now he brings the rougher sound of those stage performances to the recording studio." He opined that Hornsby's vocal delivery was too similar throughout the album and felt that the album was embellished by the presence of multiple guest performers, particularly highlighting Wayne Shorter's saxophone playing during "Fire on the Cross".

Writing for Musician magazine, Jon Young wrote that the album "boasts truly inspired moments", specifically citing the album's "dramatic arrangements and beefy choruses" on certain songs such as the title track and "Fire on the Cross". He felt that the album possessed some "overwrought and glib" moments, criticizing "Lost Soul" for sounding "more patronizing than perceptive" and comparing "Barren Ground" to a public service ad. Young also believed that Don Gehman, the album's co-producer, could have infused more of a "rural rasp" akin his work with John Couger Mellencamp, expressing his belief that A Night on the Town was "too smooth to consistently support (Hornsby's) passions."

== Track listing ==
All tracks are written by Bruce Hornsby, with additional writers noted.

A Night on the Town track listing
No.	Title	Writer(s)	Length
1.	"A Night on the Town"	John Hornsby	4:26
2.	"Carry the Water"		5:09
3.	"Fire on the Cross"	J. Hornsby	4:39
4.	"Barren Ground"	J. Hornsby	5:29
5.	"Across the River"	J. Hornsby	5:10
6.	"Stranded on Easy Street"	J. Hornsby	3:54
7.	"Stander on the Mountain"		6:10
8.	"Lost Soul"		5:45
9.	"Another Day"		4:24
10.	"Special Night"		4:11
11.	"These Arms of Mine"		5:53

== Personnel ==
=== Bruce Hornsby & The Range ===
- Bruce Hornsby – lead vocals, piano, accordion, synthesizers
- George Marinelli – guitars, mandolin, backing vocals
- Joe Puerta – bass, backing vocals
- John Molo – drums, percussion

==== Additional musicians ====
- Phil Shenale – percussion and keyboard programming
- Béla Fleck – banjo (3, 4)
- Wayne Shorter – tenor saxophone (3)
- Jerry Garcia – guitar (4, 5)
- David Mansfield – guitar (6), violin (7)
- Jimmie Wood – harmonica (6)
- Charlie Haden – acoustic bass (7)
- Laura Creamer – backing vocals (2, 5)
- Shaun Murphy – backing vocals (2, 5)
- Shawn Colvin – backing vocals (4, 7, 10), vocals (8)
- Arnold McCuller – backing vocals (9, 11)
- David Lasley – backing vocals (9, 11)
- Fred White – backing vocals (11)
- Bridgette Bryant – backing vocals (11)

=== Technical ===
- Produced by Don Gehman and Bruce Hornsby
- Engineered and mixed by Ed Thacker (1, 3–11) and Eddie King (2)
- Additional engineers – Eddie King, Steve "Sound" Cormier, and Don Gehman
- Assistant engineers – Don Bosworth, Ted Pattison, Chris Winter, Robin Laine-Levine, John "Chamberlin" Pilatus, Neal Pogue
- Mastered by Stephen Marcussen at Precision Mastering (Hollywood, CA)
- Production coordinator – Sharona Sabbag
- Keyboard technician – Paul "Fuel" Johnson
- Art direction – Ria Lewerke and Norman Moore
- Photography – Peter Miller
- Design – Norman Moore
- Management – Tim Neece

== Charts and certifications ==
=== Weekly charts ===
Weekly chart performance for A Night on the Town
Chart (1990)	Peak position
Australian Albums (ARIA Charts)	59
Canada Top Albums/CDs (RPM)	14
Dutch Albums (Album Top 100)	45
European Albums (Music & Media)	55
German Albums (Offizielle Top 100)	36
Swedish Albums (Sverigetopplistan)	39
Swiss Albums (Schweizer Hitparade)	29
UK Albums (Official Charts)	23
US AOR (Radio & Records)	1
US Billboard 200	20

=== Year-end charts ===
1990 year-end chart performance for A Night on the Town
Chart (1990)	Position
Canada Top Albums/CDs (RPM)	69
US Billboard 200	95

=== Certifications ===
Certifications and sales for A Night on the Town
Region	Certification	Certified units/sales
United Kingdom (BPI)	Silver	60,000^{^}
United States (RIAA)	Gold	500,000^{^}
^{^} Shipments figures based on certification alone.
