= The Valley Road =

Single by Bruce Hornsby and the Range

from the album Scenes from the Southside
- B-side: "The Long Race"
- Released: April 1988
- Genre: Pop rock; heartland rock
- Length: 4:42
- Label: RCA Records
- Songwriters: Bruce Hornsby; John Hornsby
- Producers: Bruce Hornsby; Neil Dorfsman

Bruce Hornsby and the Range singles chronology
"Mandolin Rain" (1986)	"The Valley Road" (1988)	"Look Out Any Window" (1988)

"The Valley Road" is a song recorded by Bruce Hornsby and the Range. Hornsby co-wrote the song with his brother John Hornsby and co-produced it with Neil Dorfsman. The song is included on Bruce Hornsby and the Range's 1988 album, Scenes from the Southside. It is written in the key of A major.

Released as the lead single from the album, "Scenes from the Southside" it reached the top ten on the Billboard Hot 100 chart in June 1988, peaking at number 5 the week of July 2. It also spent a week atop the Billboard adult contemporary chart in mid-June. This was the group's third song to reach number 1 on the adult contemporary chart, following "The Way It Is" from 1986 and "Mandolin Rain" from 1987. The single spent three weeks at the summit on the Billboard mainstream rock chart, becoming the first of the group's two chart-toppers on that list. Roughly around the same time, the song reached number 44 on the UK Singles Chart.

== Background ==
Hornsby was quoted in an interview with the Chicago Tribune saying that the song was inspired by observations he made growing up in Virginia. "Every year, some rich girl would get involved with some country guy, and they would act irresponsibly and have to deal with the ramifications." He said that "The Valley Road" was about his belief that certain people in Virginia had a tendency to cling onto the past, explaining that "I'm afraid it's very much a place that looks back a lot".

When asked why many of his band's songs dealt with socio-political issues, Hornsby replied that "there are some issues that we feel are important, so we write about them... we also like to tell a story, like in 'The Valley Road', or paint a picture." In contrast to the real Valley Road in the Shenandoah Valley of Virginia, Hornsby said that his version of The Valley Road was "a place where people go parking to make out. It's a little stab at this reverence for the past."

"The Valley Road" was released as a single by RCA Records with "The Long Race" as the B-side. The twelve-inch single also included a live recording of "Mandolin Rain". A music video was created for the song, which was directed by Gary Weis and produced by Katherine Ireland. The music video includes footage of Hornsby's father playing the clarinet, an instrument he did not have any training on, despite the song not featuring any clarinet playing. There are also other scenes of Hornsby's friends walking around; Hornsby explained his approach to music videos, saying that "our videos have tended to be an excuse for getting our friends on TV."

== Critical reception ==
In their review of the single, Cashbox called it a "worthy successor to his last radio tunes", further calling the music "gently rock-country-ish" and the vocal delivery "compassionate". Music Week felt that the song was lacking in comparison to one of his earlier singles, "The Way It Is". Music & Media designated "The Valley Road" as their single of the week, calling it steady and direct piece of uptempo pop. They said that the production was "straight to the point" and that the "sharp, extended piano solo in the middle is another strong asset."

== Re-recorded version ==
In 1989, Hornsby re-recorded "The Valley Road" with the Nitty Gritty Dirt Band, which was included on the Dirt Band album Will the Circle Be Unbroken: Volume Two. Hornsby and the Dirt Band won a Grammy Award for this recording in 1990 in the category Best Bluegrass Recording. This version of the song was more in the country-bluegrass style of recording, inspired by Leon Russell and his collaborations with the New Grass Revival. The version with the Nitty Gritty Dirt Band was recorded live, an approach that Hornsby sought to recreate on his 1990 album, A Night on the Town.

Responding to some of the backlash he received from the bluegrass community on his Grammy win, Hornsby stated: "I won the bluegrass Grammy. It pissed off all the purists. And I understand their feeling about this. Here's this pop guy, and he's making this quasi-bluegrass. I totally understood the purists' protest." In an interview published in the January 1991 edition of Musician magazine, Hornsby called it "the most enjoyable record I'd done up to that time".

== Charts ==
=== Weekly charts ===
Chart (1988)	Peak position
Australia (ARIA)	36
Belgium (Ultratop 50 Flanders)	23
Canada Top Singles (RPM)	2
Canada Adult Contemporary (RPM)	1
European Airplay (Music & Media)	2
Netherlands (Dutch Top 40)	27
New Zealand (Recorded Music NZ)	20
South African Top 20	9
UK Singles (Official Charts)	44
US Billboard Hot 100	5
US Mainstream Rock (Billboard)	1
US Adult Contemporary (Billboard)	1

=== Year-end charts ===
Chart (1988)	Position
Canada Top Singles (RPM)	35
US Billboard Hot 100	78
