= Halcyon Days (Bruce Hornsby album) =

Studio album by Bruce Hornsby
- Released: August 17, 2004
- Studio: Tossington Sound (Williamsburg, Virginia); Right Track Recording (New York City, New York); Silent Sound Studios (Atlanta, Georgia); Olympic Studios (London, UK)
- Genre: Rock; Jazz
- Length: 55:48
- Label: Columbia
- Producer: Wayne Pooley; Bruce Hornsby

Bruce Hornsby chronology
Big Swing Face (2002)	Halcyon Days (2004)	Intersections (1985-2005) (2006)

Professional ratings
Review scores
Source	Rating
Rolling Stone	3/5 stars

Halcyon Days is the eighth studio album by American singer and pianist Bruce Hornsby. The album, recorded with his touring band the Noisemakers, was released in 2004. It was Hornsby's first release with Columbia Records. One song, "What The Hell Happened", has been described as a rare example of the use of bitonality in a pop piece.

The album marked a return to a more acoustic, piano-driven sound that reviewers described as "pure Hornsby". Guests included Sting, Elton John and Eric Clapton. The tracks "Gonna Be Some Changes Made," "Candy Mountain Run," "Dreamland," and "Circus On The Moon" became concert staples, each showcasing the diversity of Hornsby's improvisations and the Noisemakers' live sound. Notably, Halcyon Days also includes a suite of solo piano songs—"What The Hell Happened," "Hooray For Tom," and "Heir Gordon"—which all have a "Randy Newman pastiche." Although the album was markedly less-risk-taking than Big Swing Face, it would be well-received as a "winning balance of [Hornsby's] tuneful and adventurous sides."

"Gonna Be Some Changes Made" was used in several Lowe's commercials from 2006.

== Track listing ==
All songs written by Bruce Hornsby.

1. "Gonna Be Some Changes Made" - 5:18
2. "Candy Mountain Run" (with Eric Clapton) - 5:15
3. "Dreamland" (duet with Elton John) - 5:05
4. "Circus on the Moon" - 6:32
5. "Halcyon Days" (duet with Sting) - 5:57
6. "What the Hell Happened" - 4:22
7. "Hooray for Tom" - 3:56
8. "Heir Gordon" - 4:24
9. "Mirror on the Wall" - 5:41
10. "Song F" - 4:13
11. "Lost in the Snow" - 5:08

== Musicians ==
- Bruce Hornsby – vocals, acoustic piano, keyboards
- Eric Clapton – guitar (1, 2, 5), vocals (2)
- R. S. Hornsby – guitar (2, 9)
- Doug Derryberry – guitar (4)
- Wayne Pooley – guitar (5, 9)
- J. V. Collier – bass
- Sonny Emory – drums
- Bonny Bonaparte – percussion (4)
- Bobby Read – clarinet (4, 6, 8, 11)
- Sting – vocals (1, 5)
- Elton John – vocals (3)
- Lloyd Johns – backing vocals (3)
- Woody Green – backing vocals (3)
- Ralph Payne – backing vocals (3)
- Donnie Struckey – backing vocals (3)

Orchestra (on "Dreamland", "Hooray for Tom" and "Lost in the Snow")

- Peter Harris – orchestra arrangements (3, 7)
- John "J. T." Thomas – orchestra arrangements (11)
- Kurt Muroki and Satosh Okamoto – double bass
- Elizabeth Dyson, Jeanne LeBlanc, Elieen Moon and Sarah Seiver – cello
- David Creswell, Karen Dreyfus, Dawn Hannay, Vivek Kamath, Sue Prey and Robert Reinhart – viola
- Duoming Ba, Maryia Borozina, Jeanne Ingraham, Lisa Kim, Myung-Hi Kim, Sarah Kim, Soohyun Kwon, Matt Lehmann, Ayano Ninomiya, Suzanne Ornstein, Sandra Park, Dan Reed, Michael Roth, Laura Seaton, Fiona Simon, Paul Woodiel, Sharon Yamada and Jung Sun Yoo – violin

== Production ==
- Lennie Meat – A&R
- Bruce Hornsby – producer, mixing
- Wayne Pooley – producer, engineer
- Dagle – mixing
- Simon Climie – Pro Tools, additional engineer
- Alan Douglas – additional engineer
- Brian Garten – additional engineer
- Kevin Halpin – additional engineer
- Matt Still – additional engineer
- Tony Maserati – additional mixing (1)
- Mastered by Ted Jensen at Sterling Sound (New York City, NY).
- Moonie Geiger – production coordinator
- Patti Oates Martin – production assistant
- Melissa Reagan – CFO
- Dave Bett – art direction
- Jay Flom – logo design
- Sean Smith – photography
- Circus World Museum (Baraboo, Wisconsin) – front cover illustration
- John Scher for Metropolitan Talent Management – management
- Al Hilbert – enthusiast

Road crew

- Peter Banta
- Gary Crosniak
- Caldwell Gray
- Wayne Pooley

== Charts ==
Chart (2004)	Peak position
German Albums (Offizielle Top 100)	92
US Billboard 200	86
