= John Hornsby =

American composer, musician and actor (born 1956)

Jonathan Bigelow Hornsby (born June 13, 1956, Williamsburg, Virginia) is an American composer, musician and actor. He is the brother of musician and composer Bruce Hornsby, and the two have collaborated often.

Hornsby co-wrote seven of nine songs on the multi-platinum album The Way It Is, including the top-five hit "Mandolin Rain". Other tracks on the album helped establish what some labeled the "Virginia sound", a mixture of rock, jazz, and bluegrass, with an observational Southern feel. Bruce Hornsby's group, Bruce Hornsby and the Range, would go on to win the Grammy Award for Best New Artist in 1986. The Hornsby brothers co-wrote "Jacob's Ladder", which became a #1 hit for Huey Lewis and the News in 1987, and "The Valley Road", for the group's 1988 follow-up album Scenes from the Southside.

Hornsby contributed to six film soundtracks and was an actor in A Place to Grow in 1998, playing one of the "Centennial Singers."

He is a graduate of the University of Virginia Law School, class of 1987.

He lives in Charlottesville, Virginia, with his wife, Paige, and daughters Charlotte, Emily, Jane and son Nathan.
