= Musician (magazine) =

Music magazine published in the United States

- Categories: Music magazine
- Frequency: Monthly
- Founder: Sam Holdsworth, Gordon Baird
- First issue: October 1976
- Final issue: 1999
- Country: United States
- Language: English
- ISSN: 0733-5253

Musician was a monthly magazine that covered news and information about American popular music. First called Music America, it was founded in 1976 by Sam Holdsworth and Gordon Baird. The two friends borrowed $20,000 from relatives and started the publication in a barn in Colorado.

Subtitled "The Art, Business and Technology of Making Music", it became known for its extended and thorough articles about the stars of rock music. It was not intended as a fan magazine, but as a publication about the musician's craft, and as a result, it earned it the respect of people in the music business. As Holdsworth told an interviewer in 2003, the magazine "created a level of trust that made the musicians feel they were talking with peers". In the same article, he said that Musician was also known for unearthing details that the average magazine did not—such as why a musician chose a particular brand of instrument, or what was the inspiration for a certain song.

Musician never gained a wide following, although it had a devoted readership. It was respected by critics for the quality of its writers; among the best-known writers for Musician were rock critic Lester Bangs and soon-to-be film director Cameron Crowe. It was later renamed Musician, Player & Listener and was headquartered in Gloucester, Massachusetts.

Holdsworth and Baird sold it in January 1981 to the company that owned Billboard magazine. Holdsworth and another company executive bought it back in 1985, and ran it until selling it again in 1987. The magazine folded in 1999.
