= Mandolin Rain =

Single by Bruce Hornsby and the Range

from the album The Way It Is
- B-side: "The Red Plains"; "Every Little Kiss"
- Released: December 1986
- Recorded: 1985
- Genre: Heartland rock
- Length: 5:19 (album version); 4:45 (single mix)
- Label: RCA
- Songwriters: Bruce Hornsby; John Hornsby
- Producers: Bruce Hornsby; Elliot Scheiner

Bruce Hornsby and the Range singles chronology
"The Way It Is" (1986)	"Mandolin Rain" (1986)	"The Valley Road" (1988)

"Mandolin Rain" is the third track from The Way It Is, the debut album for Bruce Hornsby and the Range. The song was co-written by Bruce Hornsby and his brother John, and featured Range member David Mansfield on the title instrument.

Cashbox called "Mandolin Rain" an "inspired song" with "emotional acoustic-flavored production". They also predicted that the song would replicate the commercial success of "The Way It Is".

== Background ==
Co-writer of the song John Hornsby said the song is about missing someone badly: "it's about trying to pull through when so many things remind you of her – a tune, a ferry whistle, mainly a summer storm."

== Charts ==
The song, released in late 1986, peaked at number four on the Billboard Hot 100 in March 1987, following on the success of their previous single, the #1 hit and title track to their debut album, "The Way It Is". It also reached number one on the adult contemporary chart for three weeks, and number two on the Mainstream Rock Tracks chart for two weeks, also in early 1987. The song peaked at number 38 on the country chart.

Chart (1987)	Peak position
Canada Top Singles (RPM)	14
Canada Adult Contemporary (RPM)	1
Canada Country Singles (RPM)	49
UK Singles (Official Charts Company)	70
US Billboard Hot 100	4
US Mainstream Rock (Billboard)	2
US Adult Contemporary (Billboard)	1
US Hot Country Songs (Billboard)	38

Year-end chart (1987)	Position
Canada Top Singles (RPM)	99
US Top Pop Singles (Billboard)	65
