= Sick Wid It's Greatest Hits =

Greatest hits album by Sick Wid It Records
- Released: November 9, 1999
- Recorded: 1991–1996
- Genres: West Coast hip hop, Rap, Hyphy
- Length: 70:09
- Labels: Sick Wid It, Jive
- Producers: D-Shot, Femi Ojetunde, Kevin Gardner, Mike Mosley, Redwine, Roger Troutman, Sam Bostic, Studio Ton, Tone Capone

Sick Wid It Records chronology
| Southwest Riders (1997) | Sick Wid It's Greatest Hits (1999) | Fedi Fetchin (2005) |

Sick Wid It's Greatest Hits is a compilation album presented by American rap label Sick Wid It Records. It was released on November 9, 1999, on Sick Wid It and Jive Records. The album was produced by D-Shot, Femi Ojetunde, Kevin Gardner, Mike Mosley, Redwine, Roger Troutman, Sam Bostic, Studio Ton and Tone Capone. It features performances by Spice 1, Too Short, Kurupt, Daryl Hall, E-40, B-Legit, Celly Cel, Levitti, Bo–Roc, Roger Troutman and Mac Shawn.

== Critical reception ==
Professional ratings
Review scores
| Source | Rating |
|---|---|
| Allmusic | 4/5 stars |

Allmusic – "Sick Wid It...albums sold steadily throughout the...'90s, mainly because the label offered straight-up West Coast gangsta with no muss, fuss, or apologies. Released in the waning months of the decade, Sick Wid It's Greatest Hits compiles the label's best-known singles and R&B/Rap chart hits, which mainly breaks down to three songs from E-40, three songs from Click, three songs from B-Legit, two from D-Shot, two from Celly Cel, and one from Suga T...it's not bad and certainly the cream of the Sick Wid It crop, which makes it a good choice for aficionados of the style or to anyone looking to dig a little deeper than Death Row and No Limit."

== Track listing ==
1. "Sprinkle Me" (E-40 featuring Suga-T) – 4:10 (from the album In a Major Way)
2. "Hurricane" (The Click) – 4:21 (from the album Game Related)
3. "City 2 City" (B-Legit featuring Levitti) – 3:49 (from the album The Hemp Museum)
4. "The Worldwide Playaz" (D-Shot featuring Spice 1, Too Short & Bo–Roc) – 4:34 (from the album Six Figures)
5. "Hustlas and Tendas" (Suga-T featuring B-Legit, Mac Shawn & G-Note) – 3:38 (from the album Paper Chasin')
6. "Captain Save a Hoe" (E-40 featuring The Click) – 4:50 (from the album The Mail Man)
7. "It's Goin' Down" (Celly Cel) – 5:19 (from the album Killa Kali)
8. "Mr. Flamboyant" (E-40) – 6:01 (from the album Mr. Flamboyant)
9. "Check It Out" (B-Legit featuring Kurupt & E-40) – 5:20 (from the album The Hemp Museum)
10. "(I'll Be Yo') Huckleberry" (D-Shot featuring E-40, Levitti & Saulter Twins) – 4:33 (from the album Booty Call)
11. "Ghetto Smile" (B-Legit featuring Daryl Hall) – 4:14 (from the album Dangerous Ground)
12. "Scandalous" (The Click featuring Roger Troutman) – 5:06 (from the album Game Related)
13. "Things'll Never Change" (E-40 featuring Bo–Roc) – 5:03 (from the album Tha Hall of Game)
14. "Heat 4 Yo Azz" (Celly Cel) – 4:20 (from the album Heat 4 Yo Azz)
15. "Way Too Vicious" (B-Legit featuring E-40) – 4:51 (from the album Tryin' to Get a Buck)

== Personnel ==
- B-Legit – Performer
- Sam Bostic – Producer
- Celly Cel – Performer
- The Click – Performer
- D-Shot – Producer, Performer
- E-40 – Vocals, Performer
- G-Note – Performer
- Kevin Gardner – Producer
- Daryl Hall – Performer
- Kerry – Background Vocals
- Kurupt – Performer
- Levitti - Performer
- Mac Shawn – Performer
- Mike Mosley – Producer
- Femi Ojetunde – Producer
- One Drop Scott – Drum Programming, Mixing Engineer
- Redwine – Producer
- Bo–Roc – Background Vocals, Performer
- Spice 1 – Performer
- Studio Ton – Producer, Mixing Engineer, Keyboards, Drum Programming
- Suga-T – Performer
- Tone Capone – Keyboards, Producer
- Too Short – Performer
- Marvin Whitemon – Performer
