= The Best of E-40: Yesterday, Today & Tomorrow =

Greatest hits album by E-40
- Released: August 24, 2004
- Recorded: 1992–2003
- Genre: Hip-hop
- Length: 1:05:53
- Labels: Sick Wid' It; Jive
- Producers: Ant Banks; Avery Johnson; Bosko; E-40; Funk Daddy; Jake One; Mike Mosley; Rick Rock; Sam Bostic; Studio Ton; Supa Dave West

E-40 chronology
Breakin' News (2003)	The Best of E-40: Yesterday, Today & Tomorrow (2004)	My Ghetto Report Card (2006)

Professional ratings
Review scores
Source	Rating
AllMusic	4/5 stars
RapReviews	7/10

The Best of E-40: Yesterday, Today & Tomorrow is the first greatest hits album by American rapper E-40. It was released on August 24, 2004, via Sick Wid' It/Jive Records. The album peaked at number 133 on the Billboard 200 and number 43 on the Top R&B/Hip-Hop Albums charts in the United States. A companion DVD was released in 2007, featuring fifteen E-40 music videos.

== Track listing ==
No.	Title	Writer(s)	Producer(s)	Length
1.	"Intro"			0:35
2.	"Da Bumble"	Earl Stevens; Sam Bostic; Mike Mosley	Sam Bostic; Mike Mosley	4:11
3.	"Flashin'"	E. Stevens; Marvin Whitemon	Studio Ton	4:56
4.	"Zoom"	E. Stevens; Bosko Kante; Lionel Richie; Ronald LaPread	Bosko	4:10
5.	"Sideways" (featuring B-Legit and Mac Shawn)	E. Stevens; Brandt Jones; Gregory Buren	Funk Daddy	4:25
6.	"Carlos Rossi"	E. Stevens; Whitemon	Studio Ton	4:45
7.	"Rapper's Ball" (featuring Too $hort and K-Ci)	E. Stevens; Todd Shaw; Cedric Hailey; Anthony Banks	Ant Banks	5:27
8.	"Captain Save a Hoe"	E. Stevens	Studio Ton; E-40	4:49
9.	"Hope I Don't Go Back"	E. Stevens; Banks; Maurice White; Jon Lind	Ant Banks	4:39
10.	"Sprinkle Me" (featuring Suga-T)	E. Stevens; Tenina Stevens; Bostic; Mosley	Sam Bostic	4:10
11.	"Automatic" (featuring Fabolous)	E. Stevens; John Jackson; Ricardo Thomas; Harold Edward Davis; Donald Fletcher; Weldon Dean Parks; Kenneth Gamble; Leon Huff; Anthony Jackson	Rick Rock	4:42
12.	"Gas, Break, Dip" (featuring the Federation)	E. Stevens; Marvin Selmon; Anthony Caldwell; Thomas Jackson; Thomas	Rick Rock	5:05
13.	"It's On" (featuring Bone Crusher and Cotton Mouf)	E. Stevens; Wayne Hardnett; J. Anderson; Avery Johnson	Avery Johnson	4:05
14.	"Thick & Thin" (featuring Lil' Mo)	E. Stevens; Cynthia Loving; David West	Supa Dave West	4:52
15.	"Bust Yo Shit" (featuring B-Legit and Rankin' Scroo)	E. Stevens; Jones; Harold Johnson; Jacob Dutton	Jake One	5:02
Total length:				1:05:53

Sample credits

- Track 7 contains portions of the composition "Playboy Short" written by Todd Shaw.
- Track 9 contains a portion of the composition "Sun Goddess" written by Maurice White and Jon Lind.
- Track 11 contains a portion of the composition "Dancing Machine" written by Harold Edward Davis, Donald Fletcher and Weldon Dean Parks and a portion of the composition "For the Love of Money" written by Kenneth Gamble, Leon Huff and Anthony Jackson.

== Music Video DVD ==
The Best of E-40: Yesterday, Today and Tomorrow - The Videos is a compilation of music videos, released July 17, 2007 on DVD.

=== Track listing ===
1. "Captain Save a Hoe" (featuring The Click) - (from the EP The Mail Man)
2. "Practice Lookin' Hard" - (from the EP The Mail Man)
3. "1-Luv" (featuring Levitti) - (from the album In a Major Way)
4. "Sprinkle Me" (featuring Suga-T) - (from the album In a Major Way)
5. "Dusted 'N' Disgusted" (Video Version) (featuring Spice 1, Mac Mall, Celly Cel & Levitti) (from the album In a Major Way)
6. "Things'll Never Change" (featuring Bo-Roc) - (from the album Tha Hall of Game)
7. "Rapper's Ball" (featuring Too $hort & K-Ci) - (from the album Tha Hall of Game)
8. "Yay Deep" (featuring B-Legit & Richie Rich) - (from the album Southwest Riders)
9. "From the Ground Up" (featuring Too $hort, K-Ci & JoJo) - (from the album The Element of Surprise)
10. "Big Ballin' with My Homies" - (from the album Charlie Hustle: The Blueprint of a Self-Made Millionaire)
11. "Earl That's Yo' Life/L.I.Q." (featuring Too $hort, Otis & Shug) - (from the album Charlie Hustle: The Blueprint of a Self-Made Millionaire)
12. "Nah, Nah..." (featuring Nate Dogg) - (from the album Loyalty and Betrayal)
13. "Automatic" (featuring Fabolous) - (from the album Grit & Grind)
14. "One Night Stand" (featuring DJ Kayslay) - (from the album Breakin' News)
15. "Quarterbackin'" (featuring Clipse) - (from the album Breakin' News)

== Charts ==
Chart (2004)	Peak position
US Billboard 200	133
US Top R&B/Hip-Hop Albums (Billboard)	43
