= Six Figures =

Studio album by D-Shot
- Released: July 29, 1997
- Recorded: 1996–1997
- Studios: The Mob Shop (Vallejo, CA); Boss Studios (San Francisco Bay Area, CA); K-Lou Studios (Richmond, CA)
- Genres: West Coast hip hop; gangsta rap
- Length: 49:43
- Labels: Shot; Jive
- Producers: D-Shot (also exec.); Femi Ojetunde; Levitti; Studio Ton

D-Shot chronology
| The Shot Calla (1993) | Six Figures (1997) | Money, Sex & Thugs (2001) |

Singles from Six Figures
- 1. "True Worldwide Playaz" Released: 1997

Professional ratings
Review scores
| Source | Rating |
|---|---|
| AllMusic | 3/5 stars |
| RapReviews | 7/10 |
| The Source | 2.5/5 stars |

Six Figures is the second solo studio album by American rapper D-Shot. It was released on July 29, 1997, via Shot Records/Jive Records. Recording sessions took place at The Mob Shop in Vallejo, Boss Studios in San Francisco Bay Area and K-Lou Studios in Richmond. Production was handled by Femi Ojetunde, Levitti, Studio Ton, and D-Shot himself, who also served as executive producer. It features guest appearances from E-40, Levitti, B-Legit, Bo-Roc, Celly Cel, Kaveo, Mac Shawn, Mr. Malik, Spice 1 and Too $hort. The album debuted at number 81 on the Billboard 200 and number 21 on the Top R&B/Hip-Hop Albums in the United States.

The album spawned two singles: "(I'll Be Yo') Huckleberry" and "True Worldwide Playaz". The song "(I'll Be Yo') Huckleberry" was originally heard in the 1997 film Booty Call, and was also released as a single to promote the film's soundtrack album. Both singles were later included on the 1999 compilation album Sick Wid It's Greatest Hits.

== Critical reception ==
AllMusic – "...Six Figures, offers enough straight hardcore dope to make it worthwhile for any gangsta aficionado. D-Shot's rhyming is deft, and even if he simply recycles gangsta themes, he does it well... it's still a strong listen, filled with hard grooves and harder rhyming".

Rap Pages – "...Not only does D-Shot raise his own status and that of some lesser known Bay Area rappers, he corrals some of the Bay's best R&B voices..."

== Track listing ==
| No. | Title | Writer(s) | Length |
|---|---|---|---|
| 1. | "They Call Him Shot" | Danell Stevens; Femi Ojetunde; Marvin Whitemon; Billie Rae Calvin | 1:30 |
| 2. | "Duck" (featuring E-40 and B-Legit) | D. Stevens; Brandt Jones; Whitemon | 4:19 |
| 3. | "Out Tha' Pen" | D. Stevens; Ojetunde; Whitemon | 3:13 |
| 4. | "Great Britain International...Head/Lee/Own" (featuring Levitti) | D. Stevens; Lewis King; Kenneth M. Hairston; Richard P. Hazard; Ram Ramakar | 4:40 |
| 5. | "I'll Be Your Friend" | D. Stevens; Ojetunde | 4:45 |
| 6. | "One More Shot" (featuring Mr. Malik and Mac Shawn) | D. Stevens; Larry Blackmon | 5:09 |
| 7. | "True Worldwide Playaz" (featuring Too $hort and Spice 1) | D. Stevens; Todd Shaw; Robert Lee Greene Jr.; Ojetunde; Whitemon; Gerald Edward Levert; Edwin L. Nicholas | 4:37 |
| 8. | "It's Ma Thang" (featuring Kaveo and Bo-Roc) | D. Stevens; Whitemon | 4:02 |
| 9. | "Six Figures" (featuring Celly Cel) | D. Stevens; Marcellus McCarver | 3:47 |
| 10. | "Huckleberry Hotline" | D. Stevens; Whitemon | 1:17 |
| 11. | "(I'll Be Yo') Huckleberry" (featuring E-40 and Levitti) | D. Stevens; Earl Stevens; Ojetunde; Whitemon; Felton C. Pilate II | 4:38 |
| 12. | "Is It Cool to Fuck" | D. Stevens | 4:45 |
| 13. | "Reversal Interlude" | D. Stevens; Ojetunde; Whitemon; Calvin | 3:01 |
| Total length: | | | 49:43 |

== Charts ==
| Chart (1997) | Peak position |
|---|---|
| US Billboard 200 | 81 |
| US Top R&B Albums (Billboard) | 21 |
