= Little Bruce =

American rapper

- Also known as: Lil Bruce
- Origin: Vallejo, California, United States
- Genres: West Coast hip hop; Hip hop; Gangsta rap
- Occupation: Rapper
- Years active: 1989–2008
- Labels: Thizz; Sick Wid It; Jive
- Website: Little Bruce on Myspace

Little Bruce, is an American rapper from Vallejo, California, best known for this 1994 debut album released on Sick Wid It, now known as Heavy on the Grind Entertainment, and Jive Records, XXXtra Manish.

== Background ==
Little Bruce began rapping in 1989 and had a feud with Mac Dre from then until 1991, where the two rappers made several diss tracks towards each other. He was signed to Sick Wid' It in 1990 and released his debut album in 1994. Before releasing it Little Bruce appeared on several Sick Wid It Records releases, including: Tryin' to Get a Buck, Federal and Down and Dirty. His debut album was released October 11, 1994, on Sick Wid It and Jive Records, titled: XXXtra Manish. The album was produced by Mike Mosley, Sam Bostic and Studio Ton, and executive produced by B-Legit and E-40. It peaked at number 60 on the Billboard Top R&B/Hip-Hop Albums. The album features guest performances by Kaveo, Levitti, P-Dub and Funk Mobb (G-Note, K-1 & Mac Shawn). To promote the album, a single and a music video were released for the song, "Mobbin' in My Old School".

After releasing his debut album, he was dropped from the label because of tensions between fellow label-mates, in 1995. Little Bruce then left the music business to pursue pimping, although he occasionally made guest appearances on other Bay Area rappers albums, including: The Hogg in Me, It Ain't 4 Play, The Hemp Museum, Mash Confusion, Rapper Gone Bad and Hempin' Ain't Easy. In 2000 he returned to the music business with his second studio album, Give It To Me Baby! The album features guest appearances by B-Legit, Big Syke, Outlawz, Mac Shawn, Lil Italy and Miami.

Little Bruce was a frequent collaborator with Mac Dre and performed on several of the releases. He released albums of his own, including: Base Rock 2 Pimp Socks, The Liquid Assets Deal and a greatest hits collection, Triple X Classics. The compilation, Mac Dre Presents Little Bruce, features previously released music from, Give It to Me Baby! and some new material. The album, The Supa Sig Tapes, is collection of early material recorded by Mac Dre and Little Bruce, from 1989–1991.

== Discography ==
=== Studio albums ===
- XXXtra Manish (1994)
- Give It To Me Baby! (2000)
- Base Rock 2 Pimp Socks (2005)
- The Liquid Assets Deal (2007)
- Uncorrectable (2010)
- New Mobb Era (with C-Dubb) (2023)

=== Compilation albums ===
- The Supa Sig Tapes (with Mac Dre) (2003)
- The XXX Classics (2003)
- Mac Dre Presents: Little Bruce (2003)

=== Mixtapes ===
- The Truth (2006)

=== Extended plays ===
- Free (with Dubee) (2014)

=== Guest appearances ===
- 1992: "Fuck and Get Up" (from the B-Legit album Tryin' to Get a Buck)
- 1992: "Let Him Have It" (from the E-40 album Federal)
- 1992: "Old School" (from The Click album Down and Dirty)
- 1995: "It's Time to Mobb" (from the Sick Wid It compilation The Hogg in Me)
- 1995: "The Zone" (from the Funk Mobb album It Ain't 4 Play)
- 1996: "Gotta Buy Your Dope From Us" (from the B-Legit album The Hemp Museum)
- 1996: "Hennessey" (from the Potna Deuce album Heron Soup)
- 1998: "Major League" (from the D-Shot compilation Boss Ballin' 2: The Mob Bosses)
- 1998: "Where the Weed at" and "Chips" (from the Marvaless album Fearless)
- 1999: "Mathematics" (from the A-1 album Mash Confusion)
- 1999: "Valley Joe" (from the Mac Dre album Rapper Gone Bad)
- 2000: "Rap Star" and "The World Is a Mutha" (from the B-Legit album Hempin' Ain't Easy)
- 2001: "Have You Eva" and "Chevs and Fords" (from the Mac Dre album It's Not What You Say... It's How You Say It)
- 2002: "Pimpin' Appealin'" (from the Miami compilation Collection of Dope)
- 2008: "Livin' N Da City" (from the Mac Dre compilation Dre Area)
