= XXXtra Manish =

Studio album by Little Bruce
- Released: October 11, 1994
- Recorded: 1993–1994
- Genre: West Coast hip hop; gangsta rap
- Length: 53:17
- Label: Sick Wid It, Jive
- Producer: B-Legit (exec.); E-40 (exec.); Mike Mosley; Sam Bostic; Studio Ton

Little Bruce chronology
XXXtra Manish (1994)	Give It to Me Baby! (2000)

Singles from XXXtra Manish
- 1. "Mobbin' In My Old School" Released: 1996

XXXtra Manish is the debut album by American rapper Little Bruce, released October 11, 1994, on Sick Wid It and Jive Records. The album was produced by Mike Mosley, Sam Bostic and Studio Ton, and executive produced by B-Legit and E-40. The album peaked at number 60 on the Billboard Top R&B/Hip-Hop Albums chart. It features guest performances by Kaveo, Levitti, P-Dub and Funk Mobb.

Along with a single, a music video was released for the song, "Mobbin' In My Old School".

== Track listing ==
1. "Intro" – 3:05
2. "Raw Deal" (featuring Kaveo) – 4:42
3. "Mobbin' In My Old School" – 4:36
4. "I Love a Tramp" (featuring Mac Shawn) – 4:21
5. "Somethin' Terrible" – 4:07
6. "Funk Mobb Niggaz" (featuring Funk Mobb & P-Dub) – 5:16
7. "Fuck Little Bruce" – 4:23
8. "Lite Samethin'" – 4:58
9. "Now Like This" (featuring G-Note) – 4:15
10. "FootLocka Crew" – 3:56
11. "Cognac Killa" – 4:51
12. "Keep a Tre' 8" (featuring G-Note & Levitti) – 4:46

== Charts ==
Chart (1994)	Peak position
U.S. Billboard Top R&B/Hip-Hop Albums	60

== Personnel ==
- B-Legit – rap
- Sam Bostic – guitar
- G-Note – rap
- K1 – rap
- Kaveo – rap
- Levitti – rap
- Mac Shawn – rap
- P-Dub – rap
- Studio Ton – guitar, bass guitar
