= Deep Conversation =

Studio album by Celly Cel
- Released: June 20, 2000
- Recorded: 2000
- Genre: Gangsta rap Hardcore rap West Coast rap
- Label: Realside Records
- Producer: Celly Cel; Bosko; Charlie Doyle; G-Man Stan; DJ Fingaz

Celly Cel chronology
The Best of Celly Cel (1999)	Deep Conversation (2000)	Song'z U Can't Find (2002)

Professional ratings
Review scores
Source	Rating
Allmusic	4/5 stars

Deep Conversation is the fourth studio album by Vallejo, California rapper, Celly Cel. The album was released in 2000 for Realside Records and was produced by Celly Cel and Bosko. The album was not a commercial success, only making it to #94 on the Top R&B/Hip-Hop album chart, however the album spawned two singles, "The Return of the Real Niggaz" and "Which One Is U?". Guests included on the album are Kurupt, WC and Young Bleed.

== Track listing ==
1. "I'm Back" (Keith, Marceles McCarver) - 2:34
2. "Return of the Real Niggaz" feat. WC (Doyle, McCarver, W.C.) - 4:17
3. "The Game Ain't Blind" (Doyle, McCarver) - 4:02
4. "You Know Me" (Doyle, McCarver) - 4:19
5. "Stressin'" (D.J. Fingaz, McCarver) - 3:47
6. "When Yo Man Get Sleepy" (Doyle, J.R., McCarver) - 4:03
7. "What U Need" (Doyle, McCarver) - 4:12
8. "The Dog in Me" feat. Kurupt (Brown, Kante, McCarver) - 3:52
9. "Which One Is U?" (Keith, McCarver) - 4:49
10. "Nasty" feat. Grip (Doyle, Grip, McCarver) - 4:22
11. "Make Um Bounce" feat. Young Bleed () - 3:54
12. "Broken Home" (J.R., Keith, McCarver) – 4:39
13. "Listen to My 9" (Doyle, McCarver) - 4:25

== Personnel ==
- Bosko – producer
- Celly Cel – executive producer
- WC – performer
- Young Bleed – performer
