= The G Filez =

Studio album by Celly Cel
- Released: July 14, 1998
- Recorded: 1997–98
- Genres: West Coast hip hop; gangsta rap; hardcore hip hop
- Length: 1:15:32
- Labels: Sick Wid' It; Jive
- Producers: B-Legit (exec.); E-40 (exec.); Celly Cel; C-Funk; G-Man Stan; K-Lou; Mark D; Mike Mosley; QDIII; Rick Rock; Sam Bostic; Sean T; Spliff; Studio Ton; Tone Capone

Celly Cel chronology
Killa Kali (1996)	The G Filez (1998)	The Best of Celly Cel (1999)

Professional ratings
Review scores
Source	Rating
AllMusic	3/5 stars

The G Filez is the third solo studio album by American rapper Celly Cel. It was released on July 14, 1998 through Sick Wid It/Jive Records. Production was handled by G-Man Stan, Sam Bostic, Spliff, Studio Ton, Tone Capone, K-Lou, Mark D, Mike Mosley, ProHoeZak, Quincy Jones III, Rick Rock, Sean T and Celly Cel himself, with co-producer Don Juan, and executive producers E-40 and B-Legit. It features guest appearances from E-40, B-Legit, C-Bo, Chill, Keak da Sneak, L.I.T., Mac Reese, Mack 10, Messy Marv, Mugzi, Rappin' 4-Tay, San Quinn, Silkk the Shocker, UGK, Miss Mocha, Otis & Shug. The album peaked at number 53 on the Billboard 200 and number 17 on the Top R&B/Hip-Hop Albums chart. The album spawned three singles, "Fuck tha World", "Get a Real Job" and "Pop the Trunk".

== Track listing ==
No.	Title	Writer(s)	Producer(s)	Length
1.	"Why Must I Be Like That?" (featuring E-40)	Marcellus McCarver; Earl Stevens; Stan Keith; George Clinton, Jr.; Garry Shider; David Spradley	G-Man Stan; Celly Cel (co.)	4:40
2.	"Fuck tha World" (featuring Silkk the Shocker)	M. McCarver; Vyshonn Miller; Ricardo Thomas	Rick Rock	4:08
3.	"Every Day Is tha Weekend" (featuring Otis & Shug)	M. McCarver; Sam Bostic	Sam Bostic	4:00
4.	"The G Filez" (featuring L.I.T.)	M. McCarver; T. McCarver; M. Parker; William Collins; Joel Johnson	Spliff; Celly Cel (co.)	3:50
5.	"Don't Wanna See Us" (featuring San Quinn, Messy Marv, Black Nate and Kaveo)	M. McCarver; Quincy Brooks; Marvin Watson; N. Barnett; Brandt Jones; Kevin Davis; Sean Thompson	Sean T	4:28
6.	"Can I Kick It?" (featuring Keak da Sneak and Young Mugzi)	M. McCarver; Charles Williams; Dulon J. Stevens; Anthony Gilmour	Tone Capone	4:27
7.	"Get a Real Job"	M. McCarver; Ken Franklin	K-Lou	4:39
8.	"Ride" (featuring C-Bo)	M. McCarver; Shawn Thomas; Mike Mosley	Mike Mosley	3:50
9.	"All I Know"	M. McCarver; M. Parker	Spliff	3:52
10.	"Pop the Trunk" (featuring UGK)	M. McCarver; Bernard Freeman; Chad Butler; Marvin Whitemon	Studio Ton	4:04
11.	"Get It Crackin'" (featuring Otis & Shug)	M. McCarver; Bostic	Sam Bostic	4:00
12.	"It's Goin' Down (Remix)" (featuring Rappin' 4-Tay, E-40, B-Legit and Mack 10)	M. McCarver; Anthony Forté; E. Stevens; B. Jones; Dedrick Rolison; Gilmour	Tone Capone	5:35
13.	"Eternal Life" (featuring Mocha)	M. McCarver; Marigetta Griffin; Keith; Michael Jones; Nick Trevisick	G-Man Stan; Celly Cel (co.)	4:04
14.	"Sick Wid It Party" (featuring Mocha)	M. McCarver; Keith; Charlie Wilson; Ronnie Wilson; Lonnie Simmons; Rudy Taylor	G-Man Stan	4:03
15.	"You Neva Know"	M. McCarver; Whitemon	Studio Ton	3:43
16.	"In the Traffic" (featuring Mac Reese and Chill)	M. McCarver; C. Heard; Simon McKinley	C-Funk	4:09
17.	"The Bay"	M. McCarver; M. White	Mark D	3:42
18.	"The Function" (featuring E-40 and Shay Jones)	M. McCarver; E. Stevens; Shay Jones; Quincy Jones III; Dajuan Cayson	QD3; Don Juan (co.)	4:18
Total length:				1:15:32

== Charts ==
Chart (1998)	Peak position
US Billboard 200	53
US Top R&B/Hip-Hop Albums (Billboard)	17
