= The Hemp Museum (album) =

Studio album by B-Legit
- Released: November 26, 1996
- Recorded: 1996
- Genres: West Coast hip hop; G-funk; gangsta rap
- Length: 57:48
- Labels: Sick Wid It; Jive
- Producers: B-Legit (also exec.); Emgee; Femi Ojetunde; Funk Daddy; Kevin Gardner; Mike Mosley; Redwine; Studio Ton; Tone Capone; K-Lou

B-Legit chronology
Tryin' to Get a Buck (1993)	The Hemp Museum (1996)	Hempin' Ain't Easy (1999)

Singles from The Hemp Museum
- 1. "Check It Out" / "Gotta Buy Your Dope From Us" Released: 1996; 2. "Ghetto Smile" Released: 1997

The Hemp Museum is the second solo studio album by American rapper B-Legit. It was released on November 26, 1996, through Sick Wid It/Jive Records. The album was produced by Studio Ton, Mike Mosley, Kevin Gardner, Redwine, Femi Ojetunde, Emgee, Tone Capone, and B-Legit, who also served as executive producer. It features guest appearances from C-Bo, Levitti, Celly Cel, Daryl Hall, E-40, Kurupt, A-1, and Funk Mobb.

The album peaked at number 55 on the Billboard 200 and number 15 on the Top R&B/Hip-Hop Albums in the United States.

"Can My Nine Get Ate" originally appeared on the 1995 compilation album, The Hogg in Me. "My Flow of Cash", is a bonus track exclusive to the CD release.

== Music videos ==
Along with singles, music videos were released for the songs "Check It Out" featuring E-40 and Kurupt, and "Ghetto Smile" featuring Daryl Hall.

The chorus of Hall's classic song, "Sara Smile" was reworked into "Ghetto Smile". Hall recorded new vocals for the song. The track was produced by Redwine and B-Legit and features guitars by Thaddeus Turner.

The song was later used in the 1997 film Dangerous Ground and was released as a single and a music video to promote the film's soundtrack. The music video features the clean version of the song and has B-Legit rapping and Hall and guitarist Turner performing on a separate set interspersed with scenes from the film.

== Critical reception ==
Professional ratings
Review scores
Source	Rating
AllMusic	4/5 stars
The Source	3/5 stars

AllMusic's Leo Stanley wrote: "when the thick-tongued rapper cuts "Check It Out" with E-40 and Tha Dogg Pound's Kurupt, he demonstrates his true skills". The Source reviewer stated that the album "may be the lick if you understand the science behind the Sick Wid It sound, or know the Vallejo flavor". Gabriel Alvarez of Vibe found B-Legit's "badass Bay Area baritone is as distinguishable as a Picasso brush stroke".

== Track listing ==
No.	Title	Writer(s)	Producer(s)	Length
1.	"Intro" (featuring Gail Lee Brown and Nicole Ladner)	Brandt Jones; Marvin Whitemon	Studio Ton	1:14
2.	"City 2 City" (featuring Levitti)	B. Jones; Lewis King; Whitemon	Studio Ton	3:49
3.	"For So Long" (featuring Dionne Jackson)	B. Jones; Mike Mosley	Mike Mosley; Femi Ojetunde (co.)	4:42
4.	"Check It Out" (featuring E-40 and Kurupt)	B. Jones; Earl Stevens; Ricardo Brown; Whitemon	Studio Ton	5:20
5.	"Gotta Buy Your Dope From Us" (featuring Little Bruce, C-Bo, Redwine, Francci Richard and J-Nyce)	B. Jones; Bruce Thurman; Shawn Thomas; Kevin Gardner; John Deacon	Kevin Gardner; Redwine	3:48
6.	"The Hemp Museum" (featuring Emgee and Suga-T)	B. Jones; Marcus Gore; Femi Ojetunde	Emgee; Femi Ojetunde	4:03
7.	"Neva Bite" (featuring Kaveo)	B. Jones; Whitemon	Studio Ton	4:39
8.	"Ghetto Smile" (featuring Daryl Hall)	B. Jones; Daryl Hall; Gardner; John Oates	Kevin Gardner; Redwine; B-Legit (co.)	4:15
9.	"Don't Do It (Interlude)" (featuring G-Note)	B. Jones		0:18
10.	"Can My Nine Get Ate" (featuring Mac Shawn)	B. Jones; Whitemon	Studio Ton	4:15
11.	"Niggaz Get They Wig Split" (featuring Celly Cel and C-Bo)	B. Jones; Marcellus McCarver; Thomas; Mosley	Mike Mosley	4:08
12.	"Rollin' Wit Hustlers" (featuring Harm)	B. Jones; Rodney Waller; Anthony Gilmour	Tone Capone	3:56
13.	"Get's Down Like That" (featuring A-1)	B. Jones; Dantre Jones; Tyrone Langford	B-Legit; K-Lou (co.)	5:07
14.	"D-Boy Blues" (featuring Levitti)	B. Jones; Whitemon; Isaac Hayes	Studio Ton	4:23
15.	"My Flow of Cash" (featuring Funk Mobb)	B. Jones; Clifton Dickson; DeShawn Dawson; K. Morris; Gregory Buren	Funk Daddy	3:51
Total length:				57:48

Sample credits

- Track 5 contains a portion of the composition "Another One Bites the Dust" written by John Deacon
- Track 6 contains a sample of "Learn About It" written by Earl Stevens, Brandt Jones and Mike Mosley and performed by the Click
- Track 8 contains a portion of the composition "Sara Smile" written by Hall & Oates
- Track 14 contains a portion of the composition "Do Your Thing" written by Isaac Hayes

== Personnel ==
Vocalists

- Brandt "B-Legit" Jones – vocals
- Gail Lee Brown – vocals (track 1)
- Nicole Ladner – vocals (track 1)
- Lewis "Levitti" King – vocals (tracks: 2, 14)
- Dionne Jackson – vocals (track 3)
- Earl "E-40" Stevens – vocals (track 4)
- Ricardo "Kurupt" Brown – vocals (track 4)
- "Little Bruce" Thurman – vocals (track 5)
- Shawn "C-Bo" Thomas – vocals (tracks: 5, 11)
- Robert Redwine – vocals (track 5)
- Francci Richard – vocals (track 5)
- Jnyce – vocals (track 5)
- Marcus "Emgee" Gore – vocals (track 6)
- Tenina "Suga-T" Stevens – vocals (track 6)
- Kevin "Kaveo" Davis – vocals (track 7)
- Daryl Hall – vocals (track 8)
- Clifton "G-Note" Dickson – vocals (tracks: 9, 15)
- DeShawn "Mac Shawn" Dawson – vocals (tracks: 10, 15)
- Marcellius "Celly Cel" McCarver – vocals (track 11)
- Rodney "Harm" Waller – vocals (track 12)
- Big Bone – vocals (track 13)
- D-Day – vocals (track 13)
- K. "K-1" Morris – vocals (track 15)

Instrumentalists

- Marvin "Studio Ton" Whitemon – keyboards & drum programming (tracks: 1, 2, 4, 7, 10, 14), guitar (track 10), horns programming (track 14)
- Mike Mosley – keyboards & drum programming (tracks: 3, 11)
- Femi Ojetunde – keyboards (track 3), guitar (track 6)
- Kevin Gardner – keyboards & drum programming (tracks: 5, 8)
- Thaddeus Turner – guitar (tracks: 5, 8)
- Emgee – keyboards & drum programming (track 6)
- Stan "The Guitar Man" Jones – guitar (track 6)
- James 'Flat Top' Jones – guitar (track 11)
- Ken "Squirt" Parker – scratches (track 11)
- Anthony "Tone Capone" Gilmour – drums, strings programming & keyboards (track 12)
- Antoine – guitar (track 12)
- B-Legit – keyboards & drum programming (track 13)
- Ken "K-Lou" Franklin – drum programming (track 13)
- Greg "Funk Daddy" Buren – keyboards & drum programming (track 15)

Production

- Studio Ton – producer (tracks: 1, 2, 4, 7, 10)
- Mike Mosley – producer (tracks: 3, 11)
- Kevin Gardner – producer (tracks: 5, 8)
- Redwine – producer (tracks: 5, 8)
- Femi Ojetunde – producer (track 6), co-producer (track 3)
- Emgee – producer (track 6)
- Tone Capone – producer (track 12)
- B-Legit – producer (track 13), co-producer (track 8), executive producer
- K-Lou – co-producer (track 13)
- Funk Daddy – producer (track 15)

Technical

- Studio Ton – engineering (tracks: 1, 2, 7, 10), mixing (tracks: 2, 4, 10), recording (track 14)
- K-Lou – mixing (tracks: 3, 11, 13, 15), engineering (tracks: 13, 15)
- Mike Mosley – recording (tracks: 3, 11)
- B-Legit – mixing (tracks: 3, 11), art direction
- Kevin Gardner – engineering (tracks: 5, 8)
- Samuel Stevens – engineering (tracks: 5, 8)
- Stan "The Guitar" Man – mixing & engineering (track 6)
- Emgee – mixing & engineering (track 6)
- Peter Moshay – mixing & vocal recording (track 8)
- Michael Denten – engineering (track 12)
- Tone Capone – mixing (track 12)
- Tom Coyne – mastering
- Khan aka The Guru – art direction, design
- Keba Konte – photography
- Mike Wasco – photography

== Charts ==
Chart (1996)	Peak position
US Billboard 200	55
US Top R&B Albums (Billboard)	15
