= The Best of Celly Cel =

Greatest hits album by Celly Cel
- Released: May 18, 1999
- Recorded: 1993–1998
- Genre: Gangsta rap Hardcore rap West Coast rap
- Length: 60:44
- Label: Jive Records
- Producer: Celly Cel; Studio Ton; Sam Bostic; C-Funk

Celly Cel chronology
The G Filez (1998)	The Best of Celly Cel (1999)	Deep Conversation (2000)

Professional ratings
Review scores
Source	Rating
Allmusic	Link

The Best of Celly Cel is the first greatest hits album by Vallejo, California rapper, Celly Cel. The album was released in 1999 and was Celly Cel's last project for Jive Records.

== Track listing ==
1. "It's Goin' Down" (Remix) feat. Rappin' 4-Tay, E-40, B-Legit, & Mack 10 – 5:35
2. "Pop the Trunk" feat. UGK – 4:04
3. "Heat 4 Yo Azz" – 4:22
4. "Fuck tha World" feat. Silkk the Shocker – 4:08
5. "Red Rum" feat. Spice 1 – 4:26
6. "Get a Real Job" – 4:39
7. "Hot Sunny Day" feat. Levitti & Marjuna Mitchell – 5:58
8. "4 tha Scrilla" feat. E-40, T-Bone & B-Legit – 4:09
9. "Tha Bullet" – 4:44
10. "Ride" feat. C-Bo – 3:50
11. "Remember Where You Came From" – 4:10
12. "How to Catch a Bitch" feat. E-40, Mugzi & T-Pup – 4:22
13. "Can't Tell Me Shit" – 5:18
14. "It's Goin' Down" – 5:25
