= Things'll Never Change =

1996 single by E-40 featuring Bo-Roc

Single by E-40 featuring Bo-Roc

from the album Tha Hall of Game
- Released: 1996
- Genre: Conscious hip hop
- Length: 5:06
- Label: Sick Wid It; Jive
- Songwriter(s): Earl Stevens; Mike Mosley; Femi Ojetunde; Bruce Hornsby
- Producer(s): Mosley; Ojetunde

E-40 singles chronology
| "Rapper's Ball" (1996) | "Things'll Never Change" (1996) | "Check It Out" (1996) |

Music video
- "Things'll Never Change" on YouTube

"Things'll Never Change" is a song by American rapper E-40 and the second single from his third studio album Tha Hall of Game (1996). It features American rapper Bo-Roc of The Dove Shack. The song contains a sample of "The Way It Is" by Bruce Hornsby and the Range and was produced by Mike Mosley and Femi Ojetunde. It peaked at number 26 on the Billboard Hot 100.

== Critical reception ==
Jason Birchmeier of AllMusic considered the song a "clear standout" on Tha Hall of Game, alongside "Rapper's Ball". In a November 1996 review of the album, El Surround of RapReviews predicted the song "will catch attention next month".

== Charts ==
| Charts (1996) | Peak position |
|---|---|
| UK Singles (OCC) | 98 |
| US Billboard Hot 100 | 29 |
| US Hot R&B/Hip-Hop Songs (Billboard) | 19 |
| US R&B/Hip-Hop Airplay (Billboard) | 59 |
| US Hot Rap Songs (Billboard) | 4 |
| US Dance Singles Sales (Billboard) | 26 |
