= Hempin' Ain't Easy =

Hempin' Aint Easy

Studio album by B-Legit
- Released: September 12, 2000
- Studios: The Studio Spot; Uppa Level; Live Oak (Berkeley, CA); The Orange Room (Danville, CA); Sin's Crib (Houston, TX); Boskos Chicken and Beats (Los Angeles, CA); Dollars and Spence
- Genres: West Coast hip hop; hyphy; gangsta rap; hardcore hip hop
- Length: 1:13:25
- Labels: Koch; Sick Wid It
- Producers: Ant Banks; Big Time Swisher Productions; Bosko; Clint "Payback" Sands; Daz Dillinger; Keith Clizark; Meech Wells; Sam Bostic; Sin; Studio Ton; Tone Capone

B-Legit chronology
The Hemp Museum (1996)	Hempin' Aint Easy (2000)	Hard 2 B-Legit (2002)

Professional ratings
Review scores
Source	Rating
AllMusic	3/5 stars
HipHopDX	2.5/5

Hempin' Aint Easy is the third solo studio album by American rapper B-Legit. It was released on September 12, 2000, via Koch Records. The album was produced by Studio Ton, Keith Clizark, Meech Wells, Clint "Payback" Sands, Sam Bostic, Ant Banks, Big Time Swisher Productions, Bosko, Daz Dillinger, Sin, and Tone Capone. It features guest appearances from E-40, Archie Lee, Big Remy, D-Shot, Harm, Kurupt, Levitti, Lil' Keke, Little Bruce, Mac Shawn, Mack 10, Mr. Clean, Otis & Shug, Richie Rich, Ronnie Spencer, Shortyega, Snoop Dogg, and the Mossie.

The album peaked at No. 64 on the Billboard 200, No. 13 on the Top R&B/Hip-Hop Albums and No. 21 on the Independent Albums in the United States.

== Track listing ==
No.	Title	Writer(s)	Producer(s)	Length
1.	"Intro"	Brandt Jones; Queen Jenny; Shane Cherry; Geoff Brown; Clinton Sands	Mr. Payback	0:51
2.	"Blaze It"	B. Jones; Marvin Whitemon	Studio Ton	4:27
3.	"Rap Star" (featuring Little Bruce & Levitti)	B. Jones; Bruce Thurman; Sands	Mr. Payback	4:46
4.	"What They Talkin' About"	Charlie Wilson; Lonnie Simmons; Ronnie Wilson; Rudy Taylor	Sam Bostic	3:56
5.	"Destiny" (featuring Levitti)	B. Jones; Lewis King; Whitemon	Meech Wells; Keith Clizark	4:37
6.	"The Game Is Cold" (featuring Snoop Doggy Dogg)	B. Jones; Calvin Broadus; Cecil Demetrius Womack Jr.; Keith Clark	Meech Wells; Keith Clizark	4:09
7.	"Hood Ratz & Knuckle Heads" (featuring D-Shot, E-40, Otis & Shug)	B. Jones; Glenn Grainger	Ant Banks	3:17
8.	"I'm Dyin' with Mine" (featuring Lil' Keke & Archie Lee)	B. Jones; Sinclair Ridley	Sin	4:08
9.	"It's in the Game"	B. Jones; Bosko Kante	Bosko	3:42
10.	"Hard Head Nigga"	B. Jones; Sam Bostic	Sam Bostic	5:00
11.	"Keep It P.I." (featuring Mac Shawn)	B. Jones; DeShawn Dawson; Whitemon	Studio Ton	4:45
12.	"Where the Gangstas At" (featuring Kurupt & Mack 10)	B. Jones; Ricardo Brown; W. Calhoun; Womack Jr.; Clark	Meech Wells; Keith Clizark	3:04
13.	"Grape Wine"	B. Jones; Whitemon	Studio Ton	3:56
14.	"Touch You There" (featuring Harm)	B. Jones; Rodney Waller; Anthony Gilmour	Tone Capone	3:58
15.	"Gold Ones" (featuring Richie Rich)	B. Jones; Richard Serrell; Whitemon	Studio Ton	4:41
16.	"Scared Man" (featuring E-40 & the Mossie)	B. Jones; Earl Stevens; M. Taplin; Dulon Stevens; Kevin Davis; Whitemon	Studio Ton	4:29
17.	"The World Is a Mutha"		Daz Dillinger	4:47
18.	"To All My Playaz" (featuring Big Remy, Shortyega, Ronnie Simpson & Mr. Clean)	Franne Golde; Dennis Lambert; Duane Hitchings	Big Time Swisher Productions	4:52
Total length:				1:13:25

Sample credits

- Track 4 contains elements from "Humpin'" written by Charlie Wilson, Lonnie Simmons, Ronnie Wilson and Rudy Taylor and performed by the Gap Band
- Track 7 contains elements from "Shine Your Light" written by Glenn Grainger
- Track 18 contains replayed elements from "Don't Look Any Further" written by Franne Golde, Dennis Lambert and Duane Hitchings

== Charts ==
Chart (2000)	Peak position
US Billboard 200	64
US Top R&B/Hip-Hop Albums (Billboard)	13
US Independent Albums (Billboard)	21
