= It Ain't 4 Play =

Studio album by Funk Mobb
- Released: July 15, 1996
- Recorded: 1995–96
- Genre: West Coast hip hop; gangsta rap
- Length: 1:04:23
- Label: Sick Wid' It; Jive
- Producer: B-Legit (exec.); E-40 (exec.); Funk Mobb; Kevin Gardner; K-Lou; Levitti; Redwine; Stevie D.; Studio Ton

Singles from It Ain't 4 Play
- 1. "I Wanna See Ya" Released: 1996

Professional ratings
Review scores
Source	Rating
AllMusic	4/5 stars

It Ain't 4 Play is the only studio album released by American hip hop group Funk Mobb. It was released July 15, 1996 via Sick Wid It/Jive Records. Production was handled by K-Lou, Studio Ton, LeVitti, Kevin Gardner, Redwine, Stevie Dee, and Funk Mobb, with E-40 and B-Legit serving as executive producers. It features guest appearances from B-Legit, Little Bruce, Smitty, Levitti, Double OJK, Gangsta P, and Poo-Miller. The album peaked at number 46 on the Billboard Top R&B/Hip-Hop Albums and at number 28 on the Billboard Top Heatseekers. The song "It's Time to Mobb" originally appeared on the Sick Wid' It Records 1995 compilation The Hogg in Me. The album was supported with the single "I Wanna See Ya".

== Track listing ==
No.	Title	Producers(s)	Length
1.	"I Wanna See Ya" (featuring Pleasure)	Kevin Gardner; Redwine; Mac Shawn (co.); D-Shot (co.)	3:52
2.	"Traffickin' & Smugglin'"	Studio Ton	3:58
3.	"I'm That Nigga" (featuring B-Legit)	Studio Ton	4:46
4.	"Let 'Em Know" (featuring B-Legit)	Mac Shawn	3:46
5.	"Give It to 'Em"	K-Lou	4:13
6.	"Rockafello"	K-Lou	3:59
7.	"Ain't No Love in the Drought" (featuring LeVitti)	Levitti; G-Note (co.)	5:04
8.	"Pimps up, Those Down"	Studio Ton	4:15
9.	"The Zone" (featuring Little Bruce)	K-Lou	4:11
10.	"That's What We Do" (featuring Smitty)	Stevie D.; K-Lou (co.)	4:13
11.	"Ya'll Know the Deal" (featuring B-Legit)	Kevin Gardner; Redwine	2:54
12.	"We Gettin' Stronger" (featuring Smitty, Gangsta P, Double OJK and Poo-Miller)	K-Lou; Mac Shawn (co.)	5:35
13.	"Millasville Playa" (featuring LeVitti)	Levitti	4:52
14.	"It's Time to Mobb" (featuring Little Bruce and LeVitti)	Levitti; Mac Shawn (co.)	4:45
15.	"Mr. Bubble" (Bonus Track)	K-Lou; Funk Mobb (co.)	4:00
Total length:			1:04:23

Sample credits

- Track 1 contains an interpolation of "8th Wonder" written by Ronald LaPread and Cheryl Cook
- Track 14 contains a portion of the composition "Bustin' Out" written by Rick James
- Track 15 contains a portion of the composition "Jam on It" written by Maurice Benjamin Cenac

== Personnel ==
- DeShawn "Mac Shawn" Dawson – vocals, keyboards, drum programming, producer, mixing
- Clifton "G-Note" Dickson – vocals, co-producer, mixing
- K-1 – vocals, co-producer
- Brandt "B-Legit" Jones – vocals, executive producer
- "Little Bruce" Thurmon – vocals
- Smitty – vocals
- Anton "Gangsta P" Barrett Sr. – vocals
- Double OJK – vocals
- Poo-Miller – vocals
- Lewis "Levitti" King – backing vocals, keyboards, drum programming, producer, mixing
- Pleasure – backing vocals
- Ken "K-Lou" Franklin – keyboards, drum programming, producer, mixing, engineering
- Marvin "Studio Ton" Whitemon – keyboards, drum programming, producer, mixing, engineering
- Kevin Gardner – keyboards, drum programming, producer
- Robert Redwine – producer
- Steve Davison – keyboards, drum programming, producer
- Dannell "D-Shot" Stevens – co-producer
- Tom Brick – mastering
- Earl "E-40" Stevens – executive producer
- Keba Konte – photography
- Phunky Phat Graph-X – design

== Charts ==
Chart performance for It Ain't 4 Play
Chart (1996)	Peak position
US Top R&B/Hip-Hop Albums (Billboard)	46
US Heatseekers Albums (Billboard)	28
