= Game Related =

Studio album by The Click
- Released: November 7, 1995
- Recorded: 1994–1995
- Genres: West Coast hip hop; gangsta rap
- Length: 63:06
- Labels: Sick Wid' It; Jive
- Producers: Kevin Gardner; Mike Mosley; Roger Troutman; Studio Ton; Tone Capone

The Click chronology
Down and Dirty (1992)	Game Related (1995)	Money & Muscle (2001)

Singles from Game Related
- 1. "Hurricane" Released: August 23, 1995; 2. "Scandalous" Released: March 11, 1996

Professional ratings
Review scores
Source	Rating
AllMusic	3.5/5 stars
Muzik	0.5/5 stars
Rap Pages	8/10
The Source	3.5/5 stars

Game Related is the second studio album by American hip hop quartet The Click. It was released on November 7, 1995, via Sick Wid' It/Jive Records. Production was handled by Studio Ton, Mike Mosley, Kevin Gardner, Tone Capone and Roger Troutman. The album peaked at number 21 on the Billboard 200 and number 3 on the Top R&B/Hip-Hop Albums in the United States. It was certified Gold by the Recording Industry Association of America on December 9, 1998, for selling 500,000 copies in the US alone.

Two singles with accompanying music videos were released for "Hurricane" and "Scandalous", with its lead single reaching number 63 on the US Billboard Hot 100. Music video for "Scandalous" features a cameo from Boots Riley. Both "Hurricane" and "Scandalous" were later included on the 1999 compilation album Sick Wid It's Greatest Hits. The song "Hot Ones Echo Thru the Ghetto", was originally heard in the 1995 film Tales from the Hood, as well as released on the film's soundtrack album.

== Track listing ==
No.	Title	Writer(s)	Producer(s)	Length
1.	"Wolf Tickets"	Earl Stevens; Brandt Jones; Danell Stevens; Tenina Stevens; Marvin Whitemon	Studio Ton	4:32
2.	"Hurricane"	E. Stevens; Jones; D. Stevens; T. Stevens; Whitemon	Studio Ton	4:21
3.	"Out My Body"	E. Stevens; Jones; Mike Mosley	Mike Mosley	3:55
4.	"World Went Crazy"	E. Stevens; Whitemon	Studio Ton	4:40
5.	"Actin' Bad"	E. Stevens; Jones; D. Stevens; Kevin Gardner	Kevin Gardner	4:24
6.	"Get Chopped"	E. Stevens; D. Stevens; Mosley	Mike Mosley	4:26
7.	"We Don't Fuck Wit' Dat"	Jones; Whitemon	Studio Ton	4:44
8.	"Be About Yo' Paper"	E. Stevens; Jones; D. Stevens; Whitemon	Studio Ton	4:36
9.	"Boss Baller"	D. Stevens; Whitemon	Studio Ton	3:58
10.	"Scandalous"	E. Stevens; Jones; D. Stevens; T. Stevens; Roger Troutman; Larry Troutman; Shirley Murdock	Roger Troutman	5:07
11.	"Learn About It"	E. Stevens; Jones; Mosley	Mike Mosley	4:24
12.	"If I Took Your Boyfriend"	T. Stevens; Anthony Gilmour; Prince Rogers Nelson	Tone Capone	3:57
13.	"Rock up My Birdie"	E. Stevens; Jones; D. Stevens; Whitemon	Studio Ton	5:24
14.	"Hot Ones Echo Thru the Ghetto"	E. Stevens; Jones; D. Stevens; T. Stevens; Whitemon	Studio Ton	4:38
Total length:				1:03:06

Sample credits

- Track 10 contains a portion of the composition "Computer Love" written by Roger Troutman, Larry Troutman and Shirley Murdock.
- Track 12 contains a portion of the composition "If I Was Your Girlfriend" written by Prince Rogers Nelson.

== Personnel ==
- Earl "E-40" Stevens – lead vocals (tracks: 1–6, 8, 10, 11, 13, 14), mixing (tracks: 3, 5, 11), executive producer
- Brandt "B-Legit" Jones – lead vocals (tracks: 1–3, 5, 7, 8, 10, 11, 13, 14), mixing (tracks: 3, 5, 11), executive producer
- Danell "D-Shot" Stevens – lead vocals (tracks: 1, 2, 5, 8–10, 13, 14), backing vocals (track 6)
- Tenina "Suga-T" Stevens – lead vocals (tracks: 1, 2, 10, 12, 14)
- Kevin "Kaveo" Davis – backing vocals (track 1)
- Thomas "T-Pup" Hudson – backing vocals (track 1)
- Lewis "Levitti" King – backing vocals (tracks: 8, 14)
- Marvin "Studio Ton" Whitemon – keyboards, drum programming, producer (tracks: 1, 2, 4, 7–9, 13, 14), mixing (track 6), engineering (tracks: 1, 2, 4, 6–9, 13, 14)
- Mike Mosley – keyboards, drum programming, producer (tracks: 3, 6, 11), guitar (tracks: 3, 11), mixing (track 6)
- Kevin Gardner – drum programming & producer (track 5)
- Roger Troutman – talkbox, keyboards, guitar, bass, drum programming, producer (track 10)
- Anthony "Tone Capone" Gilmour – guitar, drum programming, engineering, producer (track 12)
- Femi Ojetunde – keyboards (track 3)
- Ken "K-Lou" Franklin – keyboards & guitar (track 5), mixing & engineering (tracks: 3, 5, 11)
- Lester Troutman – engineering (track 10)
- J. Lane – keyboards (track 12)
- Tom Coyne – mastering
- Chaz Hayes – executive producer, management
- Phunky Phat Graph-X – artwork & design
- Keba Konte – photography

== Charts ==
=== Weekly charts ===
Chart (1995)	Peak position
US Billboard 200	21
US Top R&B Albums (Billboard)	3

=== Year-end charts ===
Chart (1996)	Position
US Top R&B/Hip-Hop Albums (Billboard)	54

== Certifications ==
Region	Certification	Certified units/sales
United States (RIAA)	Gold	500,000^{^}
^{^} Shipments figures based on certification alone.
