= It'z Real Out Here =

Studio album by Celly Cel
- Released: March 8, 2005
- Recorded: 2004
- Genre: Gangsta rap, hardcore rap, West Coast hip hop
- Label: 33rd Street Records
- Producer: Celly Cel (exec.), Hobo Tone, Sam Bostic

Celly Cel chronology
Song'z U Can't Find (2002)	It'z Real Out Here (2005)	The Wild West (2006)

It'z Real Out Here is the fifth studio album by Vallejo, California rapper, Celly Cel. The album was released in 2005, for 33rd Street Records and was produced by Celly Cel and Sam Bostic. The album was not a commercial success and featured no charting singles. Guests include WC, E-40, Juvenile and Jay Tee of N2Deep.

== Track listing ==
No.	Title	Length
1.	"Neva Leave You Again (Intro)"	2:41
2.	"Thugged Out"	3:53
3.	"Whatugonedo?" (featuring Stressmatic)	4:23
4.	"Jealous"	4:28
5.	"Who Iz That?"	4:20
6.	"I Told Yall"	4:09
7.	"No Tomorrow"	4:32
8.	"It'z Real Out Here" (featuring Hobo Tone, Young Kev & Mo. Cheez)	4:08
9.	"Scrape Wit Me" (featuring Juvenile & The Federation)	3:57
10.	"D-Boyz" (featuring E-40)	4:03
11.	"Seniorita" (featuring Jay Tee)	4:03
12.	"Real Niggaz" (featuring WC)	3:30
13.	"They Go 2 Wayz"	4:11
14.	"When I Ride" (featuring Mac Reese & Protajay)	4:31
15.	"I Want You" (featuring Art n' Soul)	4:05
16.	"Not Tha Average"	4:27
17.	"Keep It Real"	4:17
Total length:		73:57
