= The Way It Is (Bruce Hornsby album) =

- Album cover on the reissue

Studio album by Bruce Hornsby and the Range
- Released: April 24, 1986 (original release); December 20, 1986 (reissue)
- Recorded: 1985–1986
- Studios: Rumbo Recorders (Canoga Park); Ocean Way Recording (Hollywood); Studio D (Sausalito); Kingsound Studios (Hollywood); Village Recorder (Los Angeles); Capitol Studios (Hollywood); The Complex (Los Angeles); Conway Studios (Hollywood); Fantasy Studios (Berkeley)
- Genres: Rock; soft rock
- Length: 43:12
- Label: RCA
- Producers: Bruce Hornsby; Elliot Scheiner; Huey Lewis

Bruce Hornsby chronology
The Way It Is (1986)	Scenes from the Southside (1988)

Original release cover

The Way It Is is the debut album by Bruce Hornsby and the Range, released by RCA Records in 1986. Led by its hit title track, the album achieved multi-platinum status and contributed to the group winning the Grammy Award for Best New Artist. Other notable tracks from the album include "Mandolin Rain" and "Every Little Kiss". Huey Lewis appears on harmonica and provides vocals on "Down the Road Tonight." Lewis also co-produced this track, along with "The Long Race" and "The River Runs Low."

== Background ==
Bruce Hornsby formed The Range in 1984 while in Los Angeles, having previously spent time as a session musician for Sheena Easton and a songwriter for 20th Century Studios' music publishing company. The band sent a series of demo tapes to various record companies, initially with no success. Huey Lewis, who had befriended Hornsby a few years prior to the creation of The Range, advocated on Hornsby's behalf by encouraging record labels to sign the band.

Windham Hill Records offered to sign Hornsby after he sent them a four-song demo tape that included "The Way It Is". The tape then leaked to other record labels, who then also expressed interest in signing the artist. Hornsby's lawyer encouraged him to submit the tape to a few other labels, although Hornsby was initially hesitant as he was tired of being rejected. Hornsby ultimately declined to sign with Windham Hill Records over his belief that they were not interested in the rock music that The Range's offered. He instead went with RCA Records, saying that "with RCA, I was able to make the total record I wanted to make. They were interested in all of me, not just one side."

Some of the material written for The Way It Is related to Hornsby's home state of Virginia. The 'roadside shack' referenced in "Down the Road Tonight" related to a location near Williamsburg, Virginia. "The Wild Frontier" relates to Hornsby's desire to escape from Los Angeles and return to Virginia. He explained that "L.A. is okay but not great. I just have an overall feeling of 'Well, this place really isn't for me...I don't think anybody out there really likes breathing the air or dealing with the traffic. That's where I live, but Virginia is my home."

Hornsby found the recording process for The Way It Is to be a departure from the session work he had previously done in Los Angeles based on the additional responsibilities associated with making a solo album, including decisions relating to mixing and mastering.

== Releases ==
The original release of the album featured an impressionistic photograph on the cover of Bruce Hornsby playing an accordion. It was initially aimed at the New Age music market and included slightly different versions of the songs "Down the Road Tonight" and "The River Runs Low."

As the album's tracks began to receive regular airplay on pop music stations in late 1986, it was remixed and subsequently re-released on December 20, 1986, with a new sepia-toned cover featuring a photograph of the band superimposed over an image of the Chesapeake Bay Bridge–Tunnel in Virginia.

== Critical reception ==
Professional ratings
Review scores
Source	Rating
AllMusic	4.5/5 stars
Robert Christgau	B−

In their review of The Way It Is, Billboard said that its songs "recall the melodic flow and western imagery that reached a peak with the Eagles", adding that the music "laces these elements with a canny mix of acoustic and electric accents." Reviewing the album for The Village Voice, Robert Christgau felt that Hornsby's piano playing bore of a resemblance to Elton John than Floyd Domino. He said that the title track was his "guilty pleasure of 1986", but he was less impressed with the remainder of the album.

== Track listing ==
All tracks are written by Bruce Hornsby and John Hornsby, except where noted.

No.	Title	Writer(s)	Length
1.	"On the Western Skyline"		4:42
2.	"Every Little Kiss"	Bruce Hornsby	5:48
3.	"Mandolin Rain"		5:19
4.	"The Long Race"		4:26
5.	"The Way It Is"	Bruce Hornsby	4:58
6.	"Down the Road Tonight"		4:26
7.	"The Wild Frontier"		4:04
8.	"The River Runs Low"		4:28
9.	"The Red Plains"		5:01

The track times listed are for the current release of the album. The opening of "Every Little Kiss" features an extended quotation from the beginning of Movement III, "The Alcotts", from Charles Ives's Piano Sonata No. 2.

=== Live: The Way It Is Tour 1986–87 ===
No.	Title	Length
1.	"Every Little Kiss"	6:27
2.	"The Long Race"	6:02
3.	"The Way It Is (Solo Piano Intro)"	7:07
4.	"The Way It Is"	6:25
5.	"Mandolin Rain"	6:31
6.	"The Red Plains"	6:44
7.	"On the Western Skyline"	6:19

Produced by DIR Broadcasting for the King Biscuit Flower Hour. Recorded live at The Ritz, New York City, February 2, 1987 by Effanel Music.

== Personnel ==
=== Bruce Hornsby and The Range ===
- Bruce Hornsby – lead vocals, piano, accordion, synthesizer, hammered dulcimer, OB-X, LinnDrum
- David Mansfield – guitar, mandolin, violin
- George Marinelli – electric and acoustic guitars, backing vocals
- Joe Puerta – bass, backing vocals
- John Molo – drums, percussion

==== Additional musicians ====
- Huey Lewis – harmonica (6), backing vocals (6)
- Sean Hopper – synthesizer consultant
- Jon Gilutin – synthesizer consultant
- Jeff Gerson – enforcement

=== Technical ===
- Produced by Bruce Hornsby (1–3, 5, 7, 9), Elliot Scheiner (1–3, 5, 7, 9), and Huey Lewis (4, 6, 8)
- Executive producer – Paul Atkinson
- Engineered by Elliot Scheiner (1–3, 5, 7, 9) and Jim Gaines (4, 6, 8)
- Additional engineers – Eddie King and Jeff "Nik" Norman
- Mixed by Elliot Scheiner, Don Smith, Eddie King, and David Luke
- Digital editing – Bob Harlan
- Mastered by Stephen Marcussen at Precision Lacquer (Hollywood, CA)
- Production assistant – Ivy Skoff
- A&R coordination – Marge Meoli
- Art direction and design – Ted Raess
- Art consultant – Kathy Hornsby
- Photography – Aaron Rapoport
- Inner sleeve photography – Robert Llewellyn
- Management – Tim Neece

== Charts and certifications ==
=== Weekly charts ===
Weekly chart performance for The Way It Is
Chart (1986)	Peak position
Australian Albums (Kent Music Report)	20
Canada Top Albums/CDs (RPM)	2
Dutch Albums (Album Top 100)	3
German Albums (Offizielle Top 100)	10
New Zealand Albums (RMNZ)	7
Swedish Albums (Sverigetopplistan)	25
Swiss Albums (Schweizer Hitparade)	16
UK Albums (Official Charts)	16
US Billboard 200	3
US Top Catalog Albums (Billboard)	38

=== Year-end charts ===
Year-end chart performance for The Way It Is
Chart (1987)	Position
Canada Top Albums/CDs (RPM)	5
New Zealand Albums (RMNZ)	40
US Billboard 200	4

=== Certifications ===
Certifications for The Way It Is
Region	Certification	Certified units/sales
Australia (ARIA)	Platinum	70,000^{^}
Canada (Music Canada)	2× Platinum	200,000^{^}
United Kingdom (BPI)	Silver	60,000^{^}
United States (RIAA)	3× Platinum	3,000,000^{^}
^{^} Shipments figures based on certification alone.
