= 1-Luv =

Single by E-40 featuring Leviti

Single by E-40 featuring Leviti

from the album In a Major Way
- Released: February 25, 1995
- Genre: West Coast hip-hop
- Length: 5:08
- Label: Jive; Sick Wid It
- Songwriters: Earl Stevens; Louis King; Marvin Whitemon; Darryl Cash
- Producer: Studio Ton

E-40 singles chronology
"Captain Save a Hoe" (1994)	"1-Luv" (1995)	"Sprinkle Me" (1995)

Leviti singles chronology
"1-Luv" (1995)	"Get Right" (1996)

Music video
- "1-Luv" on YouTube

"1-Luv" is a song by American rapper E-40, and was released in February 1995 as the second single from his second studio album, In a Major Way (1995). It features R&B artist Leviti and interpolates "One Love" by Whodini. The song charted at number 71 on both the US Billboard Hot 100 and Cash Box Top 100.

== Background ==
A phone call is heard in the beginning of the song. In an interview with Complex, E-40 revealed that it was an actual call, from his cousin Kaveo, who had been telling E-40 about his time in penitentiary. E-40 dedicated the song to "the struggle and all the people that's incarcerated", and used it to explain the hard times in his life.

== Charts ==
Chart (1995)	Peak position
US Billboard Hot 100	71
US Hot R&B/Hip-Hop Songs (Billboard)	51
US Hot Rap Songs (Billboard)	4
US Cash Box Top 100	71
