= Every Little Kiss =

Single by Bruce Hornsby and the Range

from the album The Way It Is
- B-side: "The Red Plains" (NA); "The River Runs Low" (EU)
- Released: May 1986
- Recorded: 1985
- Genre: Rock; heartland rock
- Length: 5:48 (album version); 4:29 (1986 single edit); 5:10 (1987 single remix)
- Label: RCA Records
- Songwriter: Bruce Hornsby
- Producers: Bruce Hornsby; Elliot Scheiner

Bruce Hornsby and the Range singles chronology
"Every Little Kiss" (1986)	"The Way It Is" (1986)

Music video
- "Every Little Kiss" on YouTube

"Every Little Kiss" is a song recorded by Bruce Hornsby and the Range. It was first released in May 1986 as the lead single from the band's 1986 album The Way It Is. It was re-released as a single after the success of two other singles from the album, and became a Top 20 hit in July 1987.

== Background ==
Bruce's brother John Hornsby recounted that "the premise of this song is how poorer families are broken up when the husband or father has to get a job far away in another town because there are no opportunities at home." He noted that "Bruce came up with this idea in the summer of '85 when there were a lot of stories in the news about steel mills and shipyards shutting down" and that the song's theme is "the basic longing and about how it gets more intense when you have less control over your life thanks to hard economic times".

Like other songs from Hornsby's debut album, "Every Little Kiss" was composed and initially recorded with him on piano accompanied by an Oberheim OB-X analog synthesizer and a LinnDrum drum machine. The introductory solo piano passage of the song quotes "The Alcotts" movement from Charles Ives' Concord Sonata.

== Release ==
The song was originally released by RCA Records as the band's debut single along with the album The Way It Is in 1986. "Every Little Kiss" entered the US Billboard Hot 100 singles chart on July 26 at number 93, peaked at number 72 on August 23, and remained in the Hot 100 for a total of nine weeks through September 20, the week that "The Way It Is" debuted. It also hit number 18 on the Album Rock Tracks chart on July 26 and number 37 on the Hot Adult Contemporary chart on August 16.

Following the number one success of "The Way It Is" in December 1986, the band's winning of the Grammy Award for Best New Artist in February 1987 and a Top 10 showing by "Mandolin Rain" in March, RCA decided to re-release "Every Little Kiss". RCA executive vice-president Butch Waugh said "we knew it was a hit to start with" but that "it was just the new-artist syndrome" that held it back when it was initially released.

A 5:10 remix of the song was prepared by Los Angeles producer Eddie King for the new single, (Note: A 4:40 edit of this remix without the piano intro appeared on some European single releases.) and the song was chosen by RCA as a test release of the new cassette single format. On May 16, 1987, this version debuted on the Hot 100 at number 61, above its original peak position and proceeded to climb the chart, topping out at number 14 on July 11. The accompanying music video went into heavy rotation on MTV. Its 15-week second run on the singles chart ended on August 22. The song also re-entered the Hot Adult Contemporary chart, reaching number three on July 11 and making it the band's third Top 5 A/C hit.

== Reception ==
Richard Harrington of The Washington Post called the song "catchy but traditional, while Billboard declared it "upbeat American rock" and "a Jackson Browne/Bob Seger hybrid". A rock radio programmer for WHJY radio said that it "has a synthesizer that helps me bring my core audience up to 1986", but upon its first release, some radio programmers called it "too country", "too Southern" and "too mellow" for pop radio. Before the single's 1987 re-release, Hornsby himself said the single "sort of set the album up on rock radio, though it didn't cross over into the Hot 100" [sic].

== Charts ==
Chart (1986)	Peak position
Netherlands (Dutch Top 40)	32
US Billboard Hot 100	72
US Mainstream Rock Tracks (Billboard)	18
US Adult Contemporary (Billboard)	37

Chart (1987)	Peak position
Canada Top Singles (RPM)	36
Canada Adult Contemporary (RPM)	9
US Billboard Hot 100	14
US Adult Contemporary (Billboard)	3
