= Funk Mobb =

American hip hop group

- From left to right: G-Note, K-1 and Mac Shawn in the studio. From the album's liner notes.

Background information
- Origin: Vallejo, California, U.S.
- Genres: West Coast hip hop; gangsta rap
- Years active: 1994–1998
- Labels: Sick Wid It; Jive
- Members: K-1; G-Note; Mac Shawn

Funk Mobb was an American, short-lived rap group composed of Bay Area rappers, K-1, G-Note and Mac Shawn who were signed by Sick Wid It and Jive Records. They were active from 1994 to 1998, first appearing on Little Bruce's debut album, XXXtra Mannish and then releasing their one and only album in 1996, It Ain't 4 Play. It peaked at number 46 on the Billboard Top R&B/Hip-Hop Albums and at number 28 on the Billboard Top Heatseekers. After the album the group would disband with Mac Shawn releasing two albums, 1997's Music fo' the Mobb and 2001's Worldwide Bosses and Playas and even joining Death Row Records for a short while. In 1999 G-Note joined No Limit Records and changed his name to Lil Italy. There he released his debut solo album, On Top of da World.

== Discography ==
=== Studio albums ===
- It Ain't 4 Play (1996)

=== Solo projects ===
- Mac Shawn – Music fo' tha' Mobb (1997)
- G-Note – On Top of da World (1999)
- G-Note – Full Blown (2001)
- Mac Shawn Presents – Worldwide Bosses and Playas (2001)

=== Guest appearances ===
Year	Album	Song
1992	Tryin' to Get a Buck	"Just Living" (B-Legit featuring Mac Shawn)
1994	XXXtra Manish	"Funk Mobb Niggaz" (Little Bruce featuring Funk Mobb)
1994	Heat 4 Yo Azz	"Pimp's, Playa's and Hustla's" (Celly Cel featuring Funk Mobb)
1995	In a Major Way	"Sideways" (E-40 featuring B-Legit, Mac Shawn)
1995	The Hogg in Me	"Time to Mobb" (Funk Mobb featuring Levitti, Little Bruce)
1996	Paper Chasin'	"Hustlas and Tendas" (Suga-T featuring B-Legit, Funk Mobb)
1996	The Hemp Museum	"My Flow of Cash" (B-Legit featuring Funk Mobb)
1998	The Golden Bay compilation	"The Akadomma Family" (B-Legit, Funk Mobb, Levitti)
1998	3 Beam Circus compilation	"Get Yo' Wig Split" (Funk Mobb)
1998	The Rumble	"Bay Area Playaz" (N2Deep featuring Mac Shawn, Taydatay, Cougnut, Da' Unda' Dogg, Kaveo, Baby Beesh, Don Cisco, J Sweets)
1999	Hempin' Ain't Easy	"Keep It P.I." (B-Legit featuring Mac Shawn)
1999	Suge Knight Represents: Chronic 2000	"I Thought You Knew" (Mac Shawn featuring E-40, Daz Dillinger)
1999	Suge Knight Represents: Chronic 2000	"It's Goin' Down" (Mac Shawn featuring Daz Dillinger, Tha Realest)
2000	Too Gangsta for Radio	"Real Type Gangsta" (Mac Shawn)
2000	707 compilation	"From the Wrist" (Funk Mobb, B-Legit, Little Bruce)
2001	2002	"Your Gyrlfriend 2" (Tha Dogg Pound featuring Mac Shawn, Soopafly)
