= The Way It Is (Bruce Hornsby song) =

1986 single by Bruce Hornsby and the Range

- UK and European picture sleeves

Single by Bruce Hornsby and the Range

from the album The Way It Is
- B-side: "The Wild Frontier"
- Released: July 1986
- Studio: Studio D (Sausalito, California)
- Genre: Soft rock; heartland rock; pop
- Length: 4:58
- Label: RCA
- Songwriter: Bruce Hornsby
- Producers: Bruce Hornsby; Elliot Scheiner

Bruce Hornsby and the Range singles chronology
| "Every Little Kiss" (1986) | "The Way It Is" (1986) | "Mandolin Rain" (1986) |

Music video
- "The Way It Is" on YouTube

"The Way It Is" is a song by American rock group Bruce Hornsby and the Range. It was released in July 1986 as the second single from their debut album, The Way It Is. The song topped the charts of Canada, the Netherlands, and the United States while entering the top 20 in at least eight other countries, including Australia, Ireland, Switzerland, and the United Kingdom. Written by Bruce Hornsby, it made explicit reference to the Economic Opportunity Act, also known as the 1964 Poverty Act, as well as the Civil Rights Act of 1964. Hornsby referred to it as a "song about racism."

== Background ==
In 1985, working by himself in his garage in Van Nuys, California, Hornsby wrote the lyrics for "The Way It Is" first, after which he developed the song's music and created the song's piano lick. The song later appeared on a demo recording made by Hornsby that included "Mandolin Rain" and "The Red Plains". This tape led to him being signed by RCA Records in 1985.

The song documents racism that Hornsby encountered in the American South growing up in Williamsburg, Virginia. He said that the song was "about growing up in the sixties in a small town with narrow-minded, provincial attitudes." He specifically cited memories of individuals in the town disparaging Martin Luther King Jr., saying "not everyone in Williamsburg felt like that, of course – certainly my parents didn't - but it was the prevailing attitude."

The song features a 50 second intro, lyrics referencing the Equal Employment Opportunity Act and two piano solos. Speaking to Rolling Stone in 2020, Hornsby provided his perspective on the song, saying that it was "a wonderful accident, a great fluke. A song about racism with two improvised solos is hardly the formula for pop success then or at any time."

When discussing the song with Steve Pond in a different interview published in Rolling Stone, Hornsby expressed his belief that "The Way It Is" was not conventionally commercial, adding that it was "a very even-running song" that "doesn't reach the highs and lows that I think of as desirable". He later described "The Way It Is" as "a novelty record" that connected with people "even if it was totally uncommercial", and said that it "sounded so different than anything else".

== Release ==
"The Way It Is" initially attained commercial success in the United Kingdom. Prior to its official release as a single, BBC Radio 1 had played the song 22 times and was placed on the station's A list. British DJ Gary Davies had referred to the song as "the best record I've heard in yonks". It was officially released as a single in July 1986 by RCA Records. All editions of the UK single included "The Red Plains", with the twelve-inch single also featuring "The Wild Frontier". Commenting on the song's popularity in the United Kingdom, Hornsby mentioned that "Everyone thought it should have been a B side, but then BBC Radio 1 played it and, boom, there it went. The last place it hit was in the United States."

In the United States, "The Way It Is" initially broke on album-oriented rock radio stations. By September 12, 1986, 63% of all album-oriented rock stations reporting to Radio & Records had included the song on their playlists. The following month, a music video was released to accompany the single. It was filmed on a London rehearsal stage and was directed by Gerard de Thame and produced by Helen Langridge.

== Critical reception ==
Andy Gill wrote in New Musical Express that the song was "one of those rare cases where melancholia and euphoria shift subtly back and forth in constant elision, complementing the blend of hope and resignation in the lyrics." Billboard said that the song combined roots rock with "articulate commentary". Cashbox called the song "sensitive and wonderfully produced" and thought that it "should bring attention to Hornsby’s overlooked but worthy debut LP of the same name." The Chicago Tribune labeled it as "a moody pop/rock song with a social message as powerful as its melodic line."

== Sampling and other usage ==
The song has been sampled by various rappers such as E-40 for his song "Things'll Never Change", by Tupac for "Changes", by DJ Don Diablo for his song "Never Change", and Polo G for "Wishing for a Hero" in 2020. According to Hornsby, Polo G had planned on booking an airplane to meet with him and ask for permission to sample "The Way it Is". After hearing the sampled track from Polo G's management, Hornsby reached out to the artist and authorized him to use the song in "Wishing for a Hero".

A few years after the release of Hornsby's original version, Coretta Scott King asked permission from Hornsby to use the song for the King Center for Nonviolent Social Change. A parody version of the song using new lyrics was featured with Hornsby's permission in the Community episode "Advanced Criminal Law".

== Charts ==
=== Weekly charts ===
Weekly chart performance for "The Way It Is"
| Chart (1986–1987) | Peak position |
|---|---|
| Australia (Kent Music Report) | 12 |
| Belgium (Ultratop 50 Flanders) | 3 |
| Canada Retail Singles (The Record) | 4 |
| Canada Top Singles (RPM) | 1 |
| Europe (European Hot 100 Singles) | 13 |
| European Airplay (Music & Media) | 2 |
| Ireland (IRMA) | 8 |
| Netherlands (Dutch Top 40) | 1 |
| Netherlands (Single Top 100) | 2 |
| New Zealand (Recorded Music NZ) | 23 |
| Spain (AFYVE) | 6 |
| South Africa (Springbok Radio) | 13 |
| Switzerland (Schweizer Hitparade) | 15 |
| UK Singles (Official Charts) | 15 |
| US Billboard Hot 100 | 1 |
| US Adult Contemporary (Billboard) | 1 |
| US Album Rock Tracks (Billboard) | 3 |
| US Top 100 Singles (Cash Box) | 1 |
| West Germany (GfK) | 16 |

=== Year end charts ===
1986 year-end chart performance for "The Way It Is"
| Chart (1986) | Position |
|---|---|
| Belgium (Ultratop 50 Flanders) | 77 |
| Canada Top Singles (RPM) | 74 |
| Europe (European Hot 100 Singles) | 99 |
| Netherlands (Dutch Top 40) | 27 |
| Netherlands (Single Top 100) | 23 |

1987 year-end chart performance for "The Way It Is"
| Chart (1987) | Position |
|---|---|
| Canada Top Singles (RPM) | 56 |
| US Billboard Hot 100 | 8 |
| US Adult Contemporary (Billboard) | 19 |

== Certifications ==
Certifications for "The Way It Is"
| Region | Certification | Certified units/sales |
|---|---|---|
| United Kingdom (BPI) Sales since 2004 | Platinum | 600,000^{‡} |
^{‡} Sales+streaming figures based on certification alone.

== See also ==
- Civil rights movement in popular culture
