= Rapper's Ball =

"Rappers' Ball"

Single by E-40 featuring Too $hort and K-Ci

from the album Tha Hall of Game
- Released: September 18, 1996
- Recorded: 1996
- Studio: Pajama Studios (Oakland, CA)
- Genre: West Coast hip-hop; R&B
- Length: 5:27
- Label: Sick Wid' It; Jive
- Songwriters: Earl Stevens; Todd Shaw; Cedric Hailey; Anthony Banks
- Producer: Ant Banks

E-40 singles chronology
"Scandalous" (1996)	"Rappers' Ball" (1996)	"Things'll Never Change" (1997)

Too $hort singles chronology
"Gettin' It" (1996)	"Rappers' Ball" (1996)	"Call Me" (1997)

K-Ci singles chronology
"How Could You" (1996)	"Rappers' Ball" (1996)	"You Bring Me Up" (1997)

Music video
- "Rapper's Ball" on YouTube

"Rappers' Ball" is a song co-written and performed by American rappers E-40 and Too $hort and American R&B singer K-Ci. It was released on September 18, 1996 via Sick Wid' It/Jive Records as the lead single from E-40's third full-length solo studio album Tha Hall of Game. Co-written and produced by Ant Banks, the song contains a portion of Too $hort's 1985 composition "Playboy Short".

Charting in the United States as a b-side of the album's second single "Things'll Never Change", "Rappers' Ball" peaked at number 29 on the Billboard Hot 100, number 19 on the Hot R&B/Hip-Hop Songs, number 40 on the R&B/Hip-Hop Airplay, number 4 on the Hot Rap Songs and number 26 on the Dance Singles Sales charts.

An accompanying music video was filmed on July 13, 1996 by Eric Haywood. Beside E-40, Too $hort and K-Ci, B-Legit, Joe Clair, Mack 10 and Richie Rich among others provided cameo appearances. 2Pac also makes a cameo appearance in the music video. The music video was released for the week ending on September 1, 1996.

== Track listing ==
No.	Title	Length
1.	"Rappers' Ball" (Radio Version)
2.	"Rappers' Ball" (Instrumental)
3.	"Rappers' Ball" (LP Version)
4.	"Rappers' Ball" (Acappella)

== Personnel ==
- Earl "E-40" Stevens – lead vocals, executive producer
- Todd "Too $hort" Shaw – lead vocals
- Cedric "K-Ci" Hailey – background vocals, vocal arrangement
- Anthony "Ant" Banks – keyboards, drum programming, producer, recording, mixing
- Ryan Arnold – recording
- Eric Janko – recording
- Carlos Warlick – mixing
- Tom Coyne – mastering
- Pen & Pixel – artwork
- Chaz Hayes – management

== Charts ==
Chart (1997)	Peak position
US Billboard Hot 100	29
US Hot R&B/Hip-Hop Songs (Billboard)	19
US R&B/Hip-Hop Airplay (Billboard)	40
US Hot Rap Songs (Billboard)	4
US Dance Singles Sales (Billboard)	26
