= Tha Hall of Game =

Studio album by E-40
- Released: October 29, 1996
- Studios: Cosmic Slop Shop – Oakland, CA; Dollars & Spence; Larrabee North – Toluca Lake, CA; Pajama Studios – Oakland, CA; Spark Studio – San Diego, CA; The Mob Shop – Ojai, CA
- Genre: West Coast hip-hop
- Length: 70:28
- Labels: Sick Wid It; Jive
- Producers: Ali Malik; Ant Banks; E-40; Femi Ojetunde; Kevin Gardner; Mike Mosley; Redwine; Rick Rock; Studio Ton; Tone Capone

E-40 chronology
In a Major Way (1995)	Tha Hall of Game (1996)	The Element of Surprise (1998)

Singles from Tha Hall of Game
- 1. "Things'll Never Change"/"Rapper's Ball" Released: June 16, 1996

Professional ratings
Review scores
Source	Rating
AllMusic	4/5 stars
RapReviews	7/10
The Source	4/5 stars

Tha Hall of Game is the third album by the American rapper E-40. It was released on October 29, 1996, by Sick Wid It Records and Jive Records. The album features production by Ant Banks, Mike Mosley, Rick Rock, Studio Ton and Tone Capone. It peaked at number 2 on the Billboard Top R&B/Hip-Hop Albums and at number 4 on the Billboard 200. One single, "Things'll Never Change"/"Rapper's Ball", peaked at number 19 on the Billboard Hot R&B/Hip-Hop Songs. and performed well on several other charts. The album was certified Gold in 1997 by the RIAA. It features guest performances by fellow Click members B-Legit, D-Shot and Suga-T, as well as 2Pac, Luniz, Cold 187um, Kokane, Keak da Sneak and Levitti.

Along with the single, a music video was produced for the song, "Rapper's Ball", featuring Too Short and K-Ci and features cameo appearances by 2Pac, Ice-T and Mack 10. A second single, "Things'll Never Change", was also released as a music video, featuring Bo-Roc of the Dove Shack.

== Track listing ==
No.	Title	Writer(s)	Producer(s)	Length
1.	"Record Haters (Rasheed Wallace & AZ Diss)"	Earl Stevens; Ricardo Thomas	Rick Rock	4:38
2.	"Rapper's Ball" (featuring Too Short & K-Ci)	E. Stevens; Todd Shaw; Anthony Banks; K-Ci Hailey	Ant Banks	5:27
3.	"Growing Up"	E. Stevens; Marvin Whitemon	Studio Ton	3:52
4.	"Million Dollar Spot" (featuring 2Pac, B-Legit & Emgee)	E. Stevens; Brandt Jones; Mike Mosley; Tupac Shakur	Mike Mosley; Femi Ojetunde (co.)	4:07
5.	"Mack Minister (Skit)"			2:33
6.	"I Wanna Thank You" (featuring Suga-T)	Kevin McCord; E. Stevens (ad.); Tenina Stevens (ad.); Ali Maliek (ad.)	Ali Maliek	5:17
7.	"The Story"	E. Stevens; Mosley; Femi Ojetunde; Ephriam Galloway; Joseph Simmons; Darryl McDaniels; Rick Rubin	Mike Mosley; Femi Ojetunde (co.)	4:55
8.	"My Drinking Club" (featuring Young Mugzi & Levitti)	E. Stevens; Kevin Gardner; Lewis King; Dulon Stevens	Kevin Gardner; Redwine	4:59
9.	"Ring It" (featuring Spice 1, Keak da Sneak & Harm)	E. Stevens; Robert Lee Greene, Jr.; Anthony Gilmour; Charles Williams; Rodney Waller	Tone Capone	4:48
10.	"Pimp Talk (Skit)"			0:50
11.	"Keep Pimpin'" (featuring D-Shot)	E. Stevens; Whitemon; Danell Stevens	Studio Ton	4:13
12.	"I Like What You Do to Me" (featuring B-Legit)	Blackmon; Anthony Lockett	Studio Ton	4:00
13.	"Things'll Never Change" (featuring Bo-Roc)	E. Stevens; Mosley; Ojetunde; Bruce Hornsby	Mike Mosley; Femi Ojetunde	5:06
14.	"Circumstances" (featuring Luniz, Cold 187um, Kokane, Celly Cel & T-Pup)	Stevens; Maurice McCarver; Thomas Hudson; Thomas; Garrick Husband; Jerold Ellis II; Cold 187um; Kokane	Rick Rock	5:29
15.	"It Is What It Is" (featuring Kaveo)	Stevens; Whitemon	Studio Ton	4:47
16.	"Smebbin'"	Stevens; Whitemon	Studio Ton	3:53

Samples

- "Ring It" contains sample of "Telephone Bill" by Johnny Guitar Watson and "187 Proof" by Spice 1.
- "I Wanna Thank You" contains sample of "I Want to Thank You" by Alicia Myers and "Ready for Your Love" by Mtume.
- "Rapper's Ball" contains sample of "Playboy Short" by Too Short.
- "The Story" contains sample of "Friends" by Whodini and "Paul Revere" by Beastie Boys.
- "Things'll Never Change" contains sample of "Here We Go (Live at the Funhouse)" by Run-DMC and "The Way It Is" by Bruce Hornsby and the Range.
- "Smebbin'" contains sample of "Da Bumble" by E-40 and "Learn About It" by The Click.

== Charts ==
=== Weekly charts ===
Chart (1996–1997)	Peak position
US Billboard 200	4
US Top R&B/Hip-Hop Albums (Billboard)	2

=== Weekly charts ===
Chart (1996)	Position
US Top R&B/Hip-Hop Albums (Billboard)	66

== Certifications ==
Region	Certification	Certified units/sales
United States (RIAA)	Gold	500,000^{^}
^{^} Shipments figures based on certification alone.
