= Tryin' to Get a Buck =

Studio album by B-Legit
- Released: 1993
- Recorded: 1992–1993
- Studio: K-Lou
- Genre: Gangsta rap
- Length: 57:54
- Label: Sick Wid' It
- Producer: Studio Ton

B-Legit chronology
| Tryin' to Get a Buck (1993) | The Hemp Museum (1996) |

Professional ratings
Review scores
| Source | Rating |
|---|---|
| AllMusic | 4/5 stars |
| RapReviews | 6.5/10 |

Tryin' to Get a Buck is the debut studio album by the American rapper B-Legit, released in 1993 via Sick Wid' It Records. Recorded at K-Lou Studios, it was produced by Studio Ton. It features guest appearances from E-40, Little Bruce, Kaveo, Levitti, and Mac Shawn. In the United States, the album peaked at number 41 on the Top R&B/Hip-Hop Albums and number 26 on the Heatseekers Albums charts. Jive Records reissued the album in 1994, omitting the song "Fuck and Get Up".

== Track listing ==
All lyrics are written by Brandt Jones; all music is composed by Marvin Whitemon.

| No. | Title | Length |
|---|---|---|
| 1. | "Way Too Vicious" (featuring E-40) | 4:51 |
| 2. | "Can't Fuck W'it Me" | 5:26 |
| 3. | "The Savage" | 3:56 |
| 4. | "Tryin' to Get a Buck" (featuring Kaveo) | 3:57 |
| 5. | "Fuck and Get Up" (featuring Lil' Bruce) | 4:34 |
| 6. | "Dank Game" | 2:00 |
| 7. | "Dank Room" (featuring Lil' Bruce) | 5:26 |
| 8. | "Can't Stop Me" (featuring Levitti) | 4:24 |
| 9. | "Brought Us Back Chablis" | 1:27 |
| 10. | "Later Nighter" (featuring E-40) | 4:43 |
| 11. | "B-Legit" | 4:41 |
| 12. | "Just Living" (featuring Mac Shawn) | 4:24 |
| 13. | "Daily Routine" | 3:53 |
| 14. | "Smob Out" | 4:12 |
| Total length: | | 57:54 |

== Charts ==
| Chart (1993) | Peak position |
|---|---|
| US Top R&B/Hip-Hop Albums (Billboard) | 41 |
| US Heatseekers Albums (Billboard) | 26 |
