= Killa Kali =

Studio album by Celly Cel
- Released: April 30, 1996
- Recorded: 1995–1996
- Studios: K-Lou Studios (Richmond, CA); The Mob Shop (Vallejo, CA)
- Genres: West Coast hip hop; gangsta rap; hardcore hip hop; g-funk
- Length: 56:13
- Labels: Sick Wid' It; Jive
- Producers: Celly Cel (also exec.); Emgee; Kevin Gardner; K-Lou; Redwine; Sean T; Studio Ton; Tone Capone

Celly Cel chronology
Heat 4 Yo Azz (1994)	Killa Kali (1996)	The G Filez (1998)

Professional ratings
Review scores
Source	Rating
AllMusic	3/5 stars

Killa Kali is the second solo studio album by American rapper Celly Cel. It was released in 1996 through Sick Wid It/Jive Records. Recording sessions took place at K-Lou Studios in Richmond and at the Mob Shop in Vallejo. Production was handled by K-Lou, Kevin Gardner, Redwine, Emgee, Sean T, Studio Ton, Tone Capone, and Celly Cel himself, who also served as executive producer. It features guest appearances from B-Legit, E-40, Spice 1, Felisha, Kerry, and L.I.T. The album peaked at number 26 on the Billboard 200 and number 4 on the Top R&B/Hip-Hop Albums chart. The album featured three singles, "4 tha Scrilla", "It's Goin' Down" and "Can't Tell Me Shit". On April 15, 2026, the Recording Industry Association of America gave the single "It's Goin' Down" a Gold certification.

== Track listing ==
No.	Title	Writer(s)	Producer(s)	Length
1.	"Round 2 (Intro)"	Marcellus McCarver; Ken Franklin	K-Lou; Celly Cel	1:47
2.	"What U Niggaz Thought"	McCarver; Kevin Gardner	Kevin Gardner; Redwine	4:44
3.	"4 tha Scrilla" (featuring E-40 and B-Legit)	McCarver; Earl Stevens; Brandt Jones	Sean T	4:09
4.	"It's Goin' Down" (featuring Kerry)	McCarver; Anthony Gilmour	Tone Capone; One Drop Scott (co.)	5:25
5.	"Can't Tell Me Shit" (featuring L.I.T.)	McCarver; Franklin	K-Lou; Celly Cel	5:18
6.	"Tha Bullet"	McCarver; Franklin	K-Lou; Celly Cel	4:44
7.	"Red Rum" (featuring Spice 1)	McCarver; Robert Lee Green Jr.; Franklin	K-Lou; Celly Cel	4:27
8.	"Skanlezz Call" (featuring Felisha)	McCarver; Franklin	K-Lou; Celly Cel	0:45
9.	"Skanlezz Azz Bytchez"	McCarver; Marcus Gore	Emgee	5:16
10.	"Remember Where You Came From"	McCarver; Gardner	Kevin Gardner; Redwine	4:16
11.	"Killa Kali"	McCarver; Franklin	K-Lou; Celly Cel	5:02
12.	"Playerizm"	McCarver; Marvin Whitemon	Studio Ton	5:03
13.	"Funk Season"	McCarver; Franklin	K-Lou; Celly Cel	5:17
Total length:				56:13

== Charts ==
=== Weekly charts ===
Chart (1996)	Peak position
US Billboard 200	26
US Top R&B/Hip-Hop Albums (Billboard)	4

=== Year-end charts ===
Chart (1996)	Position
US Top R&B/Hip-Hop Albums (Billboard)	53
