= Heat 4 Yo Azz =

Studio album by Celly Cel
- Released: 1994
- Recorded: 1993–1994
- Studios: The Mob Shop (Vallejo, CA); K-Lou Studios (Richmond, CA)
- Genre: Hip-hop
- Length: 57:50
- Label: Sick Wid' It
- Producers: Mike Mosley; Sam Bostic; Studio Ton

Celly Cel chronology
| Heat 4 Yo Azz (1994) | Killa Kali (1996) |

Professional ratings
Review scores
| Source | Rating |
|---|---|
| AllMusic | 3/5 stars |

Heat 4 Yo Azz is the debut studio album by American rapper Celly Cel. It was released in 1994 via Sick Wid' It Records. Recording sessions took place at The Mob Shop in Vallejo and at K-Lou Studios in Richmond. Production was handled by Studio Ton, Mike Mosley and Sam Bostic. It features guest appearances from E-40, Levitti, B-Legit, Kaveo, Kim Larson, Mac Shawn, Marjuna, Mugzi and T-Pup.

In the United States, the album peaked at number 34 on the Top R&B/Hip-Hop Albums chart. It was re-released through Jive Records the same year without the track "Zig Zags & Body Bags".

== Track listing ==
| No. | Title | Producer(s) | Length |
|---|---|---|---|
| 1. | "Heat 4 Yo Azz" | Mike Mosley; Sam Bostic | 4:22 |
| 2. | "Bailin' Thru My Hood" (featuring B-Legit) | Mike Mosley; Sam Bostic | 4:29 |
| 3. | "What Am I Supposed to Do" | Mike Mosley; Sam Bostic | 4:29 |
| 4. | "How to Catch a Bitch" (featuring E-40, Mugzi and T-Pup) | Studio Ton | 4:21 |
| 5. | "Funk 4 Life" (featuring Levitti) | Studio Ton | 4:34 |
| 6. | "Gin Wit No Juice" | Studio Ton | 5:20 |
| 7. | "Retalliation" (featuring E-40) | Studio Ton | 5:09 |
| 8. | "Tha Body Shop" | Mike Mosley; Sam Bostic | 3:18 |
| 9. | "Pimp's, Playa's and Hustla's" (featuring Kaveo and Mac Shawn) | Mike Mosley; Sam Bostic | 5:29 |
| 10. | "Hot Sunny Day" (featuring Levitti, Marjuna and Kim Larson) | Studio Ton | 4:57 |
| 11. | "Nuthin' But Dick" | Studio Ton | 5:37 |
| 12. | "Zig Zags and Body Bag's" | Mike Mosley; Sam Bostic | 3:58 |
| 13. | "Empty tha Clip" | Studio Ton | 4:30 |

== Personnel ==
- Maurice "Celly Cel" McCarver – vocals
- Brandt "B-Legit" Jones – vocals (track 2), executive producer
- Earl "E-40" Stevens – vocals (tracks: 4, 7), executive producer
- Dulon "Mugzi" Stevens – vocals (track 4)
- Thomas "T-Pup" Hudson – vocals (track 4)
- Lewis "Levitti" King – vocals (tracks: 5, 10)
- Kevin "Kaveo" Davis – vocals (track 9)
- DeShawn "Mac Shawn" Dawson – vocals (track 9)
- Marjuna – vocals (track 10)
- Kim Larson – vocals (track 10)
- Mike Mosley – producer (tracks: 1–3, 8, 9, 12)
- Sam Bostic – guitar & producer (tracks: 1–3, 8, 9, 12)
- Marvin "Studio Ton" Whitemon – guitar, bass guitar, producer, engineering, recording, mixing (tracks: 4–7, 10, 11, 13)
- E-Way – guitar & bass guitar (tracks: 4–7, 10, 11, 13)
- Al Eaton – mastering
- Keba Konte – photography

== Charts ==
| Chart (1994) | Peak position |
|---|---|
| US Top R&B/Hip-Hop Albums (Billboard) | 34 |
| US Heatseekers Albums (Billboard) | 26 |
