= Hurricane (The Click song) =

Single by The Click

Single by The Click

from the album Game Related
- B-side: "Actin' Bad"
- Released: August 23, 1995
- Recorded: 1995
- Genre: Hip hop
- Length: 4:21
- Label: Sick Wid It, Jive
- Songwriters: Earl Stevens, Dannell Stevens, Tenina Stevens, Brandt Jones
- Producer: Studio Ton

The Click singles chronology
"Captain Save a Hoe" (1994)	"Hurricane" (1995)	"Scandalous" (1995)

"Hurricane" is a song by American hip hip group The Click. It is the lead single released from their second album, Game Related. Produced by Studio Ton, the song became The Click's most successful single, peaking at number 63 on the US Billboard Hot 100 and number four on the Billboard Hot Rap Singles. The song's title comes from the alcoholic drink of the same name.

== Track listing ==
=== A-Side ===
1. "Hurricane" (LP Version) - 4:21
2. "Hurricane" (Instrumental) - 4:18
3. "Hurricane" (Acapella) - 4:19

=== B-Side ===
1. "Hurricane" (Remix) - 4:24
2. "Hurricane" (Remix Instrumental) - 4:23
3. "Actin' Bad" - 4:26

== Charts ==
=== Weekly charts ===
Chart (1995/1996)	Peak position
US Billboard Hot 100	63
US Hot R&B/Hip-Hop Singles & Tracks (Billboard)	31
US Hot Rap Singles (Billboard)	4
US Hot Dance Music/Maxi-Singles Sales (Billboard)	33
US Rhythmic Top 40 (Billboard)	40
US Cash Box Top 100	81

=== Year-end charts ===
Chart (1996)	Position
US Hot Rap Singles (Billboard)	48
