= On Top of da World =

Studio album by Lil Italy
- Released: August 3, 1999
- Recorded: 1998–99
- Studios: K-Lou Studios (Richmond, CA); No Limit Studios (Baton Rouge, LA)
- Genre: Hip hop
- Length: 1:04:23
- Labels: No Limit; Priority
- Producers: Master P (exec.); K-Lou (also assoc.); Carlos "C-Los Beats" Stephens; Charles Doyle Leonard; KLC; Poorman Dre; Rick "Gold Fingers" Rivera

Lil Italy chronology
On Top of da World (1999)	Full Blown (2001)

Professional ratings
Review scores
Source	Rating
AllMusic	2/5 stars

On Top of da World is the debut solo studio album by American rapper Lil Italy. It was released on August 3, 1999, via No Limit Records. Recording sessions took place at K-Lou Studios in Richmond, California and at No Limit Studios in Baton Rouge, Louisiana. Production was handled by K-Lou, KLC, Ricky "Gold Fingers" Rivera, Carlos "C-Los Beats" Stephens, Charles Doyle Leonard and Poorman Dre, with Master P serving as executive producer. This is the last no limit album with any production from beats by the pound. They would leave in July 1999

The record was a commercial disappointment, peaking at No. 99 on the Billboard 200 and #20 on Top R&B/Hip-Hop Albums, and resulted in Lil Italy being dropped from the label. The album was also a critical disappointment, with Michael Gallucci of AllMusic rated the album two out of five stars, writing that it "has no personality, not one distinguishing mark to separate it from the rest of the [No Limit] army."

== Track listing ==
1. "Ghetto Fame" – 4:36 (featuring Silkk the Shocker)
2. "Come and Get It" – 3:47 (featuring Master P)
3. "Doggs Ride" – 3:36 (featuring Don P & Snoop Dogg)
4. "We Riderz" – 3:55 (featuring Magic & Don P)
5. "Power" – 2:47 (featuring Ghetto Commission)
6. "On Top of da World" – 2:41
7. "Game from Pops" – :30
8. "Fake Ass Friends" – 3:56 (featuring Don P)
9. "Hoez and Tramps" – 2:42 (featuring Fiend)
10. "Game Tight" – 3:14 (featuring Dionne Austin)
11. "We Ain't Hard 2 Find" – 3:32 (featuring Snoop Dogg & Mystikal)
12. "7 Dayz a Week" – 3:33
13. "Down-N-Dirty" – 4:33 (featuring Don P)
14. "Fuck Barney" – :23
15. "What U Gone Do" – 2:07 (featuring Buddah Mack)
16. "Fo' the Love of Money" – 3:07
17. "Bodicussy" – 2:44
18. "Suck It" – :36
19. "Oh! U Don't Know" – 4:03 (featuring Buddah Mack)
20. "I Can't Believe" – 3:38
21. "Killafornia" – 4:23 (featuring Mr. Ropa Dope)

== Charts ==
Chart (1999)	Peak position
US Billboard 200	99
US Top R&B/Hip-Hop Albums (Billboard)	20
