= Captain Save a Hoe =

1994 single by E-40 featuring The Click

Single by E-40 featuring the Click

from the EP The Mail Man
- Released: July 27, 1994
- Recorded: 1993
- Genre: Hip hop
- Length: 4:47
- Label: Sick Wid It
- Songwriters: Earl Stevens; Brandt Jones; Dannell Stevens; Tanina Stevens
- Producer: Studio Ton

E-40 singles chronology
"Captain Save a Hoe" (1994)	"1-Luv" (1995)

The Click singles chronology
"Let's Side" (1989)	"Captain Save a Hoe" (1994)	"Hurricane" (1995)

Music video
- "Captain Save a Hoe" on YouTube

"Captain Save a Hoe" (clean version titled "Captain Save Them Thoe") is a single by American rapper E-40 featuring hip hop group the Click. It is the lead single from E-40's EP The Mail Man (1993). It is E-40's breakthrough hit and one of his most well-known songs. It has been featured in the soundtrack of the video game Grand Theft Auto V.

== Background ==
The slang phrase "captain save a hoe" has come to mean a man who spends an excessive amount of time and money trying to please a woman, usually a promiscuous one. According to E-40, his inspiration for writing the song was that a lot of his friends were acting like that. Producer Studio Ton produced a "heavy mobbed out baseline" for the track, while E-40 came up with the idea and title. D-Shot of The Click thought of the hook, which was inspired by the song "Double Dutch Bus" by Frankie Smith.

The song criticizes a man who tries to "save" and impress women, especially when their help is unneeded. It ironically depicts this man as a superhero-like character called "Captain Save A Hoe".

The single was released through E-40's independent record label Sick Wid It Records. The song became more successful than expected and a clean version of the song was subsequently made, with the title "Captain Save Them Thoe". Following its regional popularity, E-40 signed to Jive Records. The label re-released the single on 12". The song also popularized the phrase used in the title.

== Critical reception ==
The song was praised by music critics for its 1970s-sounding "radio-friendly, laid-back groove".

Some feminists critiqued the song. Historian and cultural critic Davarian Baldwin notes that it portrays black women as gold-diggers who use their sexuality to take black men's meager earnings.

== Other versions ==
The song "Saved", by American singer Ty Dolla Sign featuring E-40, interpolates and pays homage to "Captain Save a Hoe". In 2020, American musician Fantastic Negrito reinvented the song in a track called "Searching for Captain Save a Hoe", which also features a verse from E-40.

== Charts ==
Chart (1994)	Peak position
US Billboard Hot 100	94
US Hot R&B/Hip-Hop Songs (Billboard)	63
US Hot Rap Songs (Billboard)	12
