= In a Major Way =

Studio album by E-40
- Released: March 14, 1995
- Recorded: 1994
- Genre: West Coast hip-hop
- Length: 58:37
- Labels: Sick Wid It; Jive
- Producers: E-40 (also exec.); Funk Daddy; Kevin Gardner; Mike Mosley; Redwine; Sam Bostic; Studio Ton

E-40 chronology
The Mail Man (1993)	In a Major Way (1995)	Tha Hall of Game (1996)

Singles from In a Major Way
- 1. "1-Luv" Released: February 25, 1995; 2. "Dusted 'n' Disgusted" Released: 1995; 3. "Sprinkle Me" Released: May 20, 1995

Professional ratings
Review scores
Source	Rating
AllMusic	4.5/5 stars
laut.de	5/5 stars
The Source	3.5/5 stars

In a Major Way is the second studio album by American rapper E-40. It was released on March 14, 1995, by Sick Wid It Records and Jive Records. Production on the album was handled by Studio Ton, Mike Mosley, Sam Bostic, Funk Daddy, Kevin Gardner, Redwine, and E-40 himself, who also served as executive producer. It features guest appearances from Levitti, 2Pac, Celly Cel, Mac Mall, Mac Shawn and Spice 1, as well as fellow The Click groupmates B-Legit and Suga-T, and his son Droop-E.

The album peaked at number 13 on the Billboard 200 and number two on the Top R&B/Hip-Hop Albums chart. It was certified Platinum by the Recording Industry Association of America (RIAA), selling 1,000,000 copies in the United States alone, as of June 3, 2002. In 2022, Rolling Stone placed In a Major Way at number 178 on their list of the 200 Greatest Hip-Hop Albums of All Time.

== Dusted 'N' Disgusted ==
Three music videos were produced to promote the album, including a clean video remix version of "Dusted 'n' Disgusted", which features rap verses from E-40, Spice 1, Mac Mall and Celly Cel. The chorus features vocals from Levitti and Suga-T. Celly Cel's verse replaces 2Pac's in the video version of the song as 2Pac was in jail at the time of filming. Richie Rich makes a cameo appearance and says a few words in the early part of the song and is seen wearing a T-shirt that clearly reads: "Free 2Pac". 187 Fac, B-Legit, D-Shot, JT The Bigga Figga, Captain Save 'Em and Funk Mobb also make cameo appearances in the video. The video version of the song is only available on the single release and does not appear on the album.

Along with singles, music videos were also produced for the songs such as "1-Luv" (featuring Levitti) and "Sprinkle Me" (featuring Suga-T).

== Track listing ==
No.	Title	Writer(s)	Producer(s)	Length
1.	"Intro"	Earl Stevens; Mike Mosley; Sam Bostic	Mike Mosley; Sam Bostic	1:44
2.	"Chip in da Phone"	E. Stevens	E-40	0:14
3.	"Da Bumble"	E. Stevens; Mosley; Bostic	Mike Mosley; Sam Bostic	4:11
4.	"Sideways" (featuring B-Legit and Mac Shawn)	E. Stevens; Brandt Jones; Gregory Buren	Funk Daddy	4:25
5.	"Spittin'"	E. Stevens; Marvin Whitemon	Studio Ton	4:41
6.	"Sprinkle Me" (featuring Suga-T)	E. Stevens; Tenina Stevens; Mosley; Bostic	Mike Mosley; Sam Bostic	4:10
7.	"Outta Bounds"	E. Stevens	E-40	0:41
8.	"Dusted 'n' Disgusted" (featuring 2Pac, Spice 1, Mac Mall, and Levitti)	E. Stevens; Tupac Shakur; Robert L. Green Jr.; Jamal Rocker; Mosley; Bostic	Mike Mosley; Sam Bostic	4:30
9.	"1-Luv" (featuring Levitti)	E. Stevens; Lewis King; Whitemon; Darryl Cash	Studio Ton	5:08
10.	"Smoke 'n Drank" (featuring Levitti)	E. Stevens; King; Kevin Gardner	Kevin Gardner; Redwine; Samuel Stephens (co.)	4:17
11.	"Dey Ain't No"	E. Stevens; Whitemon	Studio Ton	4:31
12.	"Fed" (featuring Suga-T)	E. Stevens; Buren; Randy Muller	Funk Daddy	5:12
13.	"H.I. Double L." (featuring Celly Cel and B-Legit)	E. Stevens; Marcellus McCarver; Jones; Whitemon	Studio Ton	4:43
14.	"Bootsee"	E. Stevens; Whitemon	Studio Ton	4:16
15.	"It's All Bad" (featuring Lil E)	E. Stevens; Earl Stevens, Jr.; Buren	Funk Daddy	3:28
16.	"Outro" (featuring B-Legit)	E. Stevens; Jones; Whitemon	Studio Ton	2:26
Total length:				58:37

== Charts ==
=== Weekly charts ===
Chart (1995)	Peak position
US Billboard 200	13
US Top R&B/Hip-Hop Albums (Billboard)	2

=== Year-end charts ===
Chart (1995)	Position
US Billboard 200	153
US Top R&B/Hip-Hop Albums (Billboard)	24

== Certifications ==
Region	Certification	Certified units/sales
United States (RIAA)	Platinum	1,000,000^{^}
^{^} Shipments figures based on certification alone.
