= Sprinkle Me =

1995 single by E-40 featuring Suga-T

Single by E-40 featuring Suga-T

from the album In a Major Way
- Released: May 20, 1995
- Genre: West Coast hip hop
- Length: 4:10
- Label: Sick Wid It; Jive Records
- Songwriters: Earl T. Stevens; Tanina Stevens; Michael Mosley; Sam Bostic
- Producers: Mike Mosley, Sam Bostic

E-40 singles chronology
"1-Luv" (1995)	"Sprinkle Me" (1995)	"I Got 5 On It (Remix)" (1995)

Suga-T singles chronology
"Sprinkle Me" (1995)

Music video
- "Sprinkle Me ft. Suga-T" on YouTube

"Sprinkle Me" is a song by American rapper E-40 featuring American rapper and E-40s' younger sister Suga-T. The single was released on May 20, 1995, as the third single from E-40's second studio album, In a Major Way (1995). Produced by Mike Mosley and Sam Bostic, it reached number 44 on both the US Billboard Hot 100 and Cash Box Top 100.

== Charts ==
Chart (1995)	Peak position
US Billboard Hot 100	44
US Hot R&B/Hip-Hop Songs (Billboard)	24
US Hot Rap Songs (Billboard)	5
US Rhythmic Airplay (Billboard)	27
US Cash Box Top 100	44
