= Celly Cel =

American rapper

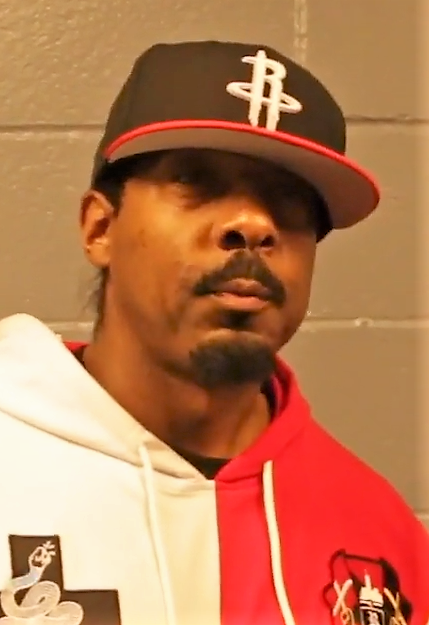
- Celly Cel in 2018

Background information
- Born: Maurice James McCarver; December 1, 1970 (age 55)
- Origin: Vallejo, California, U.S.
- Genre: Hip-hop
- Occupations: Rapper; songwriter
- Years active: 1990–present
- Labels: 33rd Street; Realside; Real Talk; Sick Wid It; Jive
- Member of: Criminalz

Maurice "Marcellus" James McCarver, better known by his stage name Celly Cel, is an American rapper from Vallejo, California. He released his first single, "Lifestyle of a Mack", on his independent record label Realside Records in 1992. He released his debut studio album, Heat 4 Yo Azz, in 1994, and released a second album, Killa Kali, two years later.

In 1996, he appeared on the Red Hot Organization's compilation album, America is Dying Slowly, alongside Biz Markie, Wu-Tang Clan, and Fat Joe, among many other prominent hip-hop artists. The album, meant to raise awareness of the AIDS epidemic among African American men, was heralded as "a masterpiece" by The Source magazine.

His next appearance wasn't until 1998, with his third album: The G Filez. Deep Conversation followed in mid-2000.

Celly has collaborated with fellow Bay Area rappers E-40 and B-Legit on several occasions.

== Discography ==
=== Studio albums ===
Title	Release	Peak chart positions	
Title	Release	US	US R&B
Heat 4 Yo Azz	1994	—	34
Killa Kali	1996	26	4
The G Filez	1998	53	17
Deep Conversation	2000	—	94
It'z Real Out Here	2005	—	—
Slaps, Straps and Baseball Hats	2006	—	—
Morphine X	2013	—	—
Dirty Mind	2017	—	—
Focused	2020	—	—

=== Collaboration albums ===
- Criminal Activity (with Criminalz) (2001)
- Bad Influence (with The Hillside Stranglaz) (2006)
- Bay Waters Run Deep (with San Quinn & Cuddy) (2018)

=== Compilation albums ===
- The Best Of Celly Cel (1999)
- Live From The Ghetto (2001)
- Song'z U Can't Find (2002)
- The Wild West (2006)
- The Wild West (Special Edition) (2006)
- The Gumbo Pot (2006)
- Cali Luv (2007)
- Best Of Celly Cel 2: Tha Sick Wid It Dayz (2007)
- The Lost Tapes (2016)

=== Extended plays ===
- Big Faces EP (2012)

=== Soundtrack appearances ===
Title	Release	Other artist(s)	Soundtrack
"The Only Way"	1997		Dangerous Ground
"Ghetto Celebrity"	1999	E-40, Suga-T	Charlie Hustle: The Blueprint of a Self-Made Millionaire
"The Bullet"	1999		Everybody Loves Sunshine
"Holla"	2000	Rappin' 4-Tay, 2-Ton	Held Up
"Time to Ball"	2006		NBA 2K7

=== Guest appearances ===
Title	Release	Other artist(s)	Album
"Dusted 'N' Disgusted" (Video Version)	1995	E-40, Spice 1, Mac Mall, Levitti	In a Major Way
"H.I. Double L."	1995	E-40, B-Legit	In a Major Way
"Beware of Those"	1995	JT Tha Bigga Figga, E-40	Dwellin' in tha Labb
"Check Ya Self"	1996	Spice 1, 187 Fac, Ant Banks, Gangsta P	America Is Dying Slowly
"Circumstances"	1996	E-40, Luniz, Cold 187um, Kokane, T-Pup	Tha Hall of Game
"Niggaz Get They Wig Split"	1996	B-Legit, C-Bo	The Hemp Museum
"Bayriders"	1996	William Floyd	NFL Jams
"I'll Be Your Friend"	1997	D-Shot, Mississippi, Levitti	Six Figures
"Six Figures"	1997	D-Shot, Levitti	Six Figures
"Respect It"	1997		Southwest Riders
"N.S.R."	1997	The Mossie	Have Heart Have Money
"Game Tight"	1997	Latino Velvet	Latino Velvet Project
"Cali Players"	1998	Marvaless, Killa Tay, Lunasicc, Big Note, Mississippi	Fearless
"Check Ya Self"	2010	Tha Dogg Pound, Butch Cassidy, LaToiya Williams	100 Wayz
"The Other Day Ago"	2012	E-40, Spice 1	The Block Brochure: Welcome to the Soil 2
