= Lil Italy =

American rapper

- Also known as: G-Note
- Born: Clifton Ray Dixon; September 8, 1973 (age 52)
- Origin: Vallejo, California
- Genres: Hip hop, West Coast hip hop
- Occupation: Rapper
- Years active: 1994–2011
- Labels: No Limit; Priority

Lil Italy is an American rapper who began his career as G-Note of California rap group Funk Mobb, who were signed to E-40's label Sick Wid It Records from 1994 to 1998, when the group disbanded.

He joined No Limit Records in 1998 under the new stage name of Lil Italy, and released his first and only album with No Limit, On Top of da World, in 1999. The record peaked at #99 on the Billboard 200 and #20 on the Top R&B/Hip-Hop Albums chart, and featured guest appearances from the likes of Silkk the Shocker, Snoop Dogg, and Magic, but Lil Italy was soon dropped from the label due to poor sales.

Lil Italy's second album, Full Blown, was distributed by independent label K-Lou in 2001, but it did not chart. In 2011, he returned after a decade-long hiatus with the new release My Life, which is only available as an MP3 download.

He was born to American parents.

== Discography ==
=== Studio albums ===
Title	Release	Peak chart positions	
Title	Release	US	US R&B
On Top of da World	Released: August 3, 1999; Label: No Limit, Priority; Format: CD, digital download, LP	99	20
Full Blown	Released: November 13, 2001; Label: K-Lou; Format: CD, digital download, LP	—	—
My Life	Released May 2011; Label: Bungalow; Format: digital download, LP	—	—
"—" denotes a recording did not chart.

=== Collaboration albums ===
- It Ain't 4 Play with Funk Mobb (1996)

=== Singles ===
Title	Release	Album
"Ghetto Fame" (featuring Silkk The Shocker)	1999	On Top of da World
"All About You"	2011	My Life
