= Salt-N-Pepa discography =

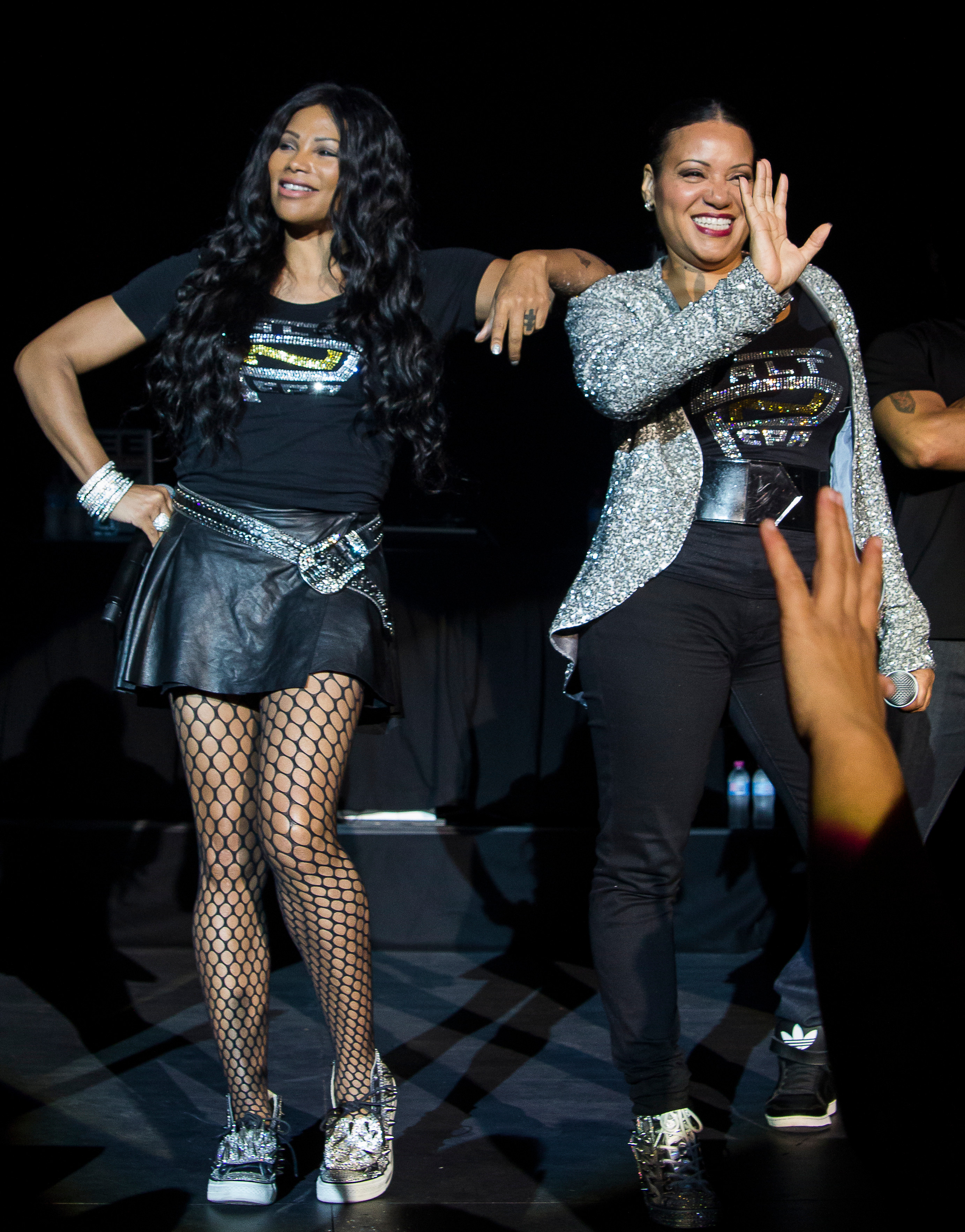
- Salt-N-Pepa performing at the Canberra Theatre in 2013
- Studio albums: 5
- Compilation albums: 6
- Singles: 27
- Music videos: 29

This is the discography of Salt-N-Pepa, an American hip hop trio.

== Albums ==
=== Studio albums ===
Year	Album details	Peak chart positions										Certifications
Year	Album details	US	US R&B	AUS	CAN	GER	NLD	NZ	NOR	SWI	UK	Certifications
1986	Hot, Cool & Vicious: Released: December 8, 1986; Label: Next Plateau	26	7	83	27	63	—	41	—	—	—	RIAA: Platinum; MC: Gold
1988	A Salt with a Deadly Pepa: Released: July 26, 1988; Label: Next Plateau	38	8	126	—	40	21	—	—	16	19	RIAA: Gold; BPI: Gold
1990	Blacks' Magic: Released: March 19, 1990; Label: Next Plateau	38	15	149	—	—	65	—	—	—	70	RIAA: Platinum
1993	Very Necessary: Released: October 12, 1993; Label: Next Plateau/London	4	6	5	13	51	66	27	19	—	36	RIAA: 5× Platinum; ARIA: Platinum; MC: 4× Platinum
1997	Brand New: Released: October 21, 1997; Label: Red Ant/London	37	16	186	—	64	—	—	—	23	—	RIAA: Gold
"—" denotes a recording that did not chart or was not released in that territory.

=== Compilation albums ===
Year	Album details	Peak chart positions										Certifications
Year	Album details	US R&B	AUS	AUT	CAN	GER	NLD	NZ	SWE	SWI	UK	Certifications
1990	A Blitz of Salt-n-Pepa Hits: The Hits Remixed: Released: November 20, 1990; Label: Next Plateau, London	63	104	—	23	—	—	—	—	—	70	MC: Platinum
1991	The Greatest Hits: Released: October 7, 1991; Label: Next Plateau, London	—	2	7	—	10	20	6	44	13	6	ARIA: Platinum; BPI: Platinum; IFPI AUT: Gold; IFPI SWI: Gold; RMNZ: Gold
1992	Rapped in Remixes: The Greatest Hits Remixed: Released: April 1992; Label: Next Plateau, London	34	—	—	—	—	—	—	—	—	37	
1999	The Best of Salt-N-Pepa: Released: November 15, 1999; Label: London	28	13	—	—	—	—	—	—	—	—	ARIA: Gold
2008	20th Century Masters: The Millennium Collection: Released: February 5, 2008; Label: Next Plateau	75	—	—	—	—	—	—	—	—	—	
2011	Icon: Released: March 1, 2011; Label: Island	14	—	—	—	—	—	—	—	—	—	
"—" denotes a recording that did not chart or was not released in that territory.

== Singles ==
=== As lead artist ===
List of singles, with selected chart positions
Title	Year	Peak chart positions										Certifications	Album
Title	Year	US	US R&B	US Rap	AUS	CAN	GER	IRE	NLD	NZ	UK	Certifications	Album
"The Show Stoppa (Is Stupid Fresh)" (Note: Published as "Súper Nature".)	1985	—	46	—	—	—	—	—	—	—	—		Hot, Cool & Vicious
"My Mic Sounds Nice"	1987	—	41	—	—	—	—	—	—	—	85		Hot, Cool & Vicious
"Tramp"	1987	—	21	—	—	—	—	—	—	—	2		Hot, Cool & Vicious
"Push It"	1987	19	28	—	3	7	9	6	1	4	2	RIAA: Platinum; BPI: Platinum; MC: Gold	The House That Rap Built and Hot, Cool & Vicious
"Chick on the Side"	1987	—	55	—	—	—	—	—	—	—	—		Hot, Cool & Vicious
"Shake Your Thang" (featuring E.U.)	1988	—	4	—	47	—	29	29	9	—	22		Livin' Large and A Salt with a Deadly Pepa
"Get Up Everybody (Get Up)"	1988	—	14	—	111	—	—	—	—	—	4		A Salt with a Deadly Pepa
"Twist and Shout"	1989	—	45	18	111	—	37	18	5	—	4		A Salt with a Deadly Pepa
"Expression"	1989	26	8	1	141	—	—	—	76	—	40	RIAA: Platinum	Blacks' Magic
"Independent" (featuring Sybil)	1990	—	18	—	—	—	—	—	—	—	—		Blacks' Magic
"Do You Want Me"	1991	21	32	7	19	—	49	22	16	49	5	RIAA: Gold	Blacks' Magic
"Let's Talk About Sex"	1991	13	51	12	1	24	1	4	1	4	2	RIAA: Gold; ARIA: Platinum; BPI: Silver; NVPI: Gold	Blacks' Magic
"You Showed Me"	1991	47	68	—	24	—	13	7	5	12	15		Blacks' Magic
"Expression (Hard Ecu Edit)"	1992	—	—	—	—	—	—	23	—	—	23		Rapped in Remixes: The Greatest Hits Remixed
"Start Me Up"	1992	—	84	—	—	—	44	—	23	—	39		Stay Tuned OST
"Shoop"	1993	4	3	1	2	—	46	—	19	31	13	RIAA: Gold; ARIA: Platinum	Very Necessary
"Whatta Man" (with En Vogue)	1993	3	3	1	2	13	39	12	3	10	7	RIAA: Platinum; ARIA: Platinum; BPI: Silver; RMNZ: Gold	Very Necessary
"None of Your Business"	1994	32	—	10	53	—	82	26	40	—	19		Very Necessary
"Heaven 'n Hell"	1994	32	—	—	21	—	—	—	—	27	—		Very Necessary
"Ain't Nuthin' But a She Thing"	1995	38	32	15	63	—	—	—	—	—	—		Ain't Nuthin' But a She Thing
"Champagne"	1996	—	— (Note: "Champagne" did not enter the Hot R&B/Hip-Hop Songs, but peaked at number 37 on the R&B/Hip-Hop Airplay.)	—	68	—	98	—	69	15	23		Bulletproof OST
"R U Ready"	1997	— (Note: "R U Ready" did not enter the Billboard Hot 100, but peaked at number 61 on the Hot 100 Airplay.)	— (Note: "R U Ready" did not enter the Hot R&B/Hip-Hop Songs, but peaked at number 26 on the R&B/Hip-Hop Airplay.)	—	—	—	35	—	—	—	24		Brand New
"Gitty Up"	1997	50	31	9	—	—	—	—	—	22	—		Brand New
"Push It (Again)"	1999	—	—	—	—	—	26	—	—	—	—		The Best of Salt-n-Pepa
"The Brick Track Versus Gitty Up"	1999	—	—	—	16	—	64	—	—	4	22	ARIA: Gold; RMNZ: Gold	The Best of Salt-n-Pepa
"—" denotes a recording that did not chart or was not released in that territory.

=== As featured performer ===
Year	Single	Artist	Peak chart positions						Album
Year	Single	Artist	US	US R&B	AUS	NLD	NZ	UK	Album
1990	"Crazy 4 U"	Sybil	—	19	147	30	26	71	Sybil
1991	"Backyard"	Pebbles	73	4	—	—	—	—	Always
2022	"Bring Back the Time" (with Rick Astley and En Vogue)	New Kids on the Block	—	—	—	—	—	—	Non-album single
"—" denotes a recording that did not chart or was not released in that territory.

== Music videos ==
Year	Single	Album
1986	"Tramp"	Hot, Cool & Vicious
1987	"Push It"	Hot, Cool & Vicious
1988	"Shake Your Thang"	A Salt with a Deadly Pepa
1988	"Get Up Everybody (Get Up)"	A Salt with a Deadly Pepa
1989	"Twist and Shout"	A Salt with a Deadly Pepa
1989	"Expression"	Blacks' Magic
1989	"Expression" ('92 Remix)	Blacks' Magic
1990	"Independent"	Blacks' Magic
1991	"Do You Want Me"	Blacks' Magic
1991	"Do You Want Me" (London Remix)	Blacks' Magic
1991	"Let's Talk About Sex"	Blacks' Magic
1991	"Let's Talk About Sex" (Luv Bug Remix)	Blacks' Magic
1991	"Let's Talk About AIDS"	Blacks' Magic
1991	"You Showed Me"	Blacks' Magic
1991	"You Showed Me" (London Remix)	Blacks' Magic
1992	"Start Me Up"	Very Necessary
1993	"Shoop"	Very Necessary
1994	"Whatta Man" (featuring En Vogue)	Very Necessary
1994	"Heaven 'n Hell"	Very Necessary
1994	"None of Your Business"	Very Necessary
1994	"None of Your Business" (Remix)	Very Necessary
1995	"Ain't Nuthin' But a She Thing"	Ain't Nuthin' But a She Thing OS
1996	"Champagne"	Bulletproof OST
1996	"Champagne (JD radio remix)"	
1997	"R U Ready"	Brand New
1997	"R U Ready" (Remix)	Brand New
1997	"Gitty Up"	Brand New
1997	"Gitty Up" (Remix)	Brand New
1997	"Imagine" (featuring Sheryl Crow)	Brand New
2022	"Bring Back the Time" (New Kids on the Block featuring Salt-N-Pepa, Rick Astley, and En Vogue)	Non-album single
