= The Best of Salt-N-Pepa =

The Best of Salt 'n Pepa

Greatest hits album by Salt-N-Pepa
- Released: November 15, 1999
- Recorded: 1985–1999
- Genre: Electronic; hip hop; house; pop-rap
- Length: 56.14
- Label: London

Salt-N-Pepa chronology
Brand New (1997)	The Best of Salt 'n Pepa (1999)	20th Century Masters: The Millennium Collection (2008)

The Best of Salt 'n Pepa is a greatest hits album by American hip hop trio Salt-N-Pepa, released in November 1999. The album featured tracks from their five studio albums, Hot, Cool & Vicious, A Salt with a Deadly Pepa, Blacks' Magic, Very Necessary and Brand New. A remixed version of their 1998 song "The Brick Track Versus Gitty Up", "Gitty Up" was released as a single and charted in the top 20 in Australia, United States and New Zealand in 2000.

== Critical reception ==
AllMusic rated the album 4 out of 5 stars. Reviewer Steve Huey described it as "an excellent 15-track overview of the groundbreaking female rap group's career", featuring all their major hits from their early days to their platinum success in the '90s. He noted the inclusion of alternate mixes such as the video version of "Whatta Man" and two different versions of "Push It," but there are no glaring omissions or substitutions. It might have been nice if the tracks were ordered chronologically, so that the group's development from cover-happy dance-rappers to sexy crossover hit makers could be traced more readily. But their assertive self-confidence and underlying feminism hold everything together, and the best singles here rank as influential hip-hop classics."

== Track listing ==
1. "Push It (Again)" (DJ Tonka Remix Edit) – 5:19
2. "The Brick Track Versus Gitty Up" (Rickidy Raw Hide Radio Mix) – 3:11
3. "Whatta Man" (featuring En Vogue; video remix) – 4:28
4. "Shake Your Thang" (It's Your Thing) – 3:57
5. "Tramp" – 3:19
6. "Let's Talk About Sex" – 3:31
7. "Do You Want Me" – 3:18
8. "Shoop" (original version) – 4:01
9. "Expression" (Hard ECU Edit) – 4:05
10. "You Showed Me" (The Born Again Mix) – 3:25
11. "None of Your Business" (Perfecto Radio Mix) – 3:22
12. "R U Ready" (E.E.C Radio Edit) – 3:32
13. "Start Me Up" (radio edit) – 3:37
14. "Twist and Shout" – 3:48
15. "Push It" (radio version) – 3:27

== Charts ==
Chart performance for The Best of Salt-N-Pepa
Chart (2000)	Peak position
Australian Albums (ARIA)	28

== Certifications ==
Certifications for The Best of Salt-N-Pepa
Region	Certification	Certified units/sales
Australia (ARIA)	Gold	35,000^{^}
^{^} Shipments figures based on certification alone.
