= Chad James Elliott =

American R&B and Soul songwriter and record producer

- Also known as: Dr. Ceuss, Big Chad
- Genres: R&B; soul
- Occupations: Songwriter; record producer; multi-instrumentalist; audio engineer
- Years active: 1988- present

Chad James Elliott, also known by his stage name Dr. Ceuss, is an American songwriter, record producer, and audio engineer. He is best known for co-writing and co-producing Destiny's Child's 2000 single "Jumpin', Jumpin'", as well as Salt-N-Pepa's "Gitty Up", Marc Nelson's "15 Minutes", and 702's "Steelo", among others.

== Career ==
=== Early career ===
In 1988, while on a promotional tour for rapper Jaz-O, Elliott met fellow record producer Irv Gotti. Elliott later introduced Gotti to DMX and the founders of Ruff Ryders Entertainment, the Dean brothers. In 1989, Gotti and Elliott produced the beat Born Loser for rapper DMX, which was one of DMX's earliest demos.

Elliott became a member of Swing Mob, a prolific collective of artists, songwriters, instrumentalists, and producers that converged in Teaneck, New Jersey and Rochester, New York during the mid-1990s, and was reportedly an early mentor of producer Jermaine Dupri. Elliott became a producer and instrumentalist for American R&B quartet Jodeci, while also frequently writing for other artists alongside fellow Swing Mob member Missy Elliott, including debut Raven-Symoné single "That's What Little Girls Are Made Of". In 1997, Elliott would contribute five songs to Salt-N-Pepa's fifth album Brand New, including lead single "R U Ready". He would also oversee the A&R direction of R&B girl-group Shades' eponymous debut album for Motown Records. In 1999, Elliott produced major single "15 Minutes" for former Az Yet member Marc Nelson, reaching the top 30 on the Billboard Hot 100, and #4 on the R&B charts.

=== Jumpin', Jumpin' ===
Elliott received a phone call from Columbia Records A&R Teresa LaBarbera Whites, who wanted him to meet "this great group in Houston" prior to the release of their debut album. He flew to Houston and met for dinner with the group (Destiny's Child) and their manager Mathew Knowles, but was unable to send any productions in time for their album. Elliott, alongside co-writer Rufus Moore and co-producer Jovonn Alexander, subsequently sent a disc of written tracks for potential inclusion on their second album. Elliott was compiling productions for his own rap project at the time, and accidentally sent one of his songs (with no lyrics attached) on the same disc. Beyoncé heard the song, began writing to it, and Mathew Knowles sent a rough draft to Elliott, who was impressed with the melodic, syncopated-rap delivery, and the "democratic" message addressed to both men and women. "Jumpin', Jumpin'", the completed product, would secure a placement on blockbuster album The Writing's on the Wall alongside another co-written Elliott song ("If You Leave"), was selected as the fourth and final single of the campaign, and would ultimately become Elliott's highest-peaking and highest-selling song in multiple global markets.

=== Later career ===
Elliott became an A&R for Sony Music Urban / Columbia Records, coordinating Jagged Edge's eponymous fifth album (2006), Noel Gourdin's 2008 debut album After My Time, Lyfe Jennings' 2008 album Lyfe Change, as well as "I'm Grown", the second single from Star Search winner Tiffany Evans' 2008 eponymous debut album.

In 2022, Elliott sold the production rights of his 2-song Destiny's Child catalog to royalty asset management company ICM for an undisclosed sum.

== Selected songwriting and production credits ==
Credits are courtesy of Discogs, Tidal, Apple Music, and AllMusic.

Title	Year	Artist	Album
"A Groove (This Is What U Rap 2)"	1990	Jaz-O	To Your Soul
"I'll Smoke You"	1990	Jaz-O	To Your Soul
"Flag of the Mahdi"	1990	Jaz-O	To Your Soul
"Black Man in Charge"	1990	Jaz-O	To Your Soul
"I Love Your Smile (Hakeem's Mix)"	1991	Shanice	Inner Child
"You Can't See What I Can See"	1992	Heavy D & The Boys	Heavy Hitz
"That's What Little Girls Are Made Of" (Featuring Missy Elliott) (#68 US, #47 R&B)	1993	Raven-Symoné	Here's to New Dreams
"Let's Go Through the Motions" (#65 US, #31 R&B)	1993	Jodeci	Who's the Man? (soundtrack)
"Candy Man"	1994	LL Cool J	Jason's Lyric (soundtrack)
"Rodeo Style" (#55 R&B)	1994	Jamecia Bennett & Mike Jackson	Jason's Lyric (soundtrack)
"You Are The Best"	1994	Smoothe Sylk	Smoothe Sylk
"Can I Make It Up To You"	1994	Groove U	Tender Love
"Don't Let It Slip Away"	1994	Groove U	Tender Love
"Dance 4 Me" (#25 R&B)	1995	Christopher Williams	Not A Perfect Man
"This Is Not A Goodbye" (#85 R&B)	1995	Subway	Good Times
"No Airplay"	1995	LL Cool J	Mr. Smith
"Steelo" (Featuring Missy Elliott) (#32 US, #12 R&B, #41 UK, #23 NZ)	1996	702	No Doubt
"Intro" (Featuring Puff Daddy)	1996	Total	Total
"Whose Is It? (Interlude)"	1996	Total	Total
"Definition of a Bad Girl (Interlude)"	1996	Total	Total
"Why Why Why"	1996	Horace Brown	Horace Brown
"Ooh, Ooh Baby" (Featuring Missy Elliott) (#81 R&B)	1996	Taral Hicks	This Time
"Get U Open"	1996	Skin Deep	Get U Open
"Sleep Over Friend"	1996	Skin Deep	Get U Open
"Farewell"	1996	Assorted Phlavors	Assorted Phlavors
"Champagne" (#23 UK, #68 AUS, #15 NZ, #98 GER, #15 SWE)	1996	Salt-N-Pepa	Bulletproof (soundtrack)
"R U Ready" (#24 UK, #35 GER)	1997	Salt-N-Pepa	Brand New
"Good Life"	1997	Salt-N-Pepa	Brand New
"Say Ooh"	1997	Salt-N-Pepa	Brand New
"Gitty Up" (#50 US, #31 Rap)	1997	Salt-N-Pepa	Brand New
"Boy Toy"	1997	Salt-N-Pepa	Brand New
"Why"	1997	Shades	Shades
"Love Never Dies"	1997	Shades	Shades
"Last to Know"	1997	Shades	Shades
"I Believe"	1997	Shades	Shades
"What Are We Gonna Do?" (#102 R&B)	1997	Ronnie Henson	Ronnie Henson
"Come On"	1997	Boyz II Men	Evolution
"Out Of Sight (Yo)" (#97 US, #52 R&B)	1998	Rufus Blaq	Credentials
"Tell Me, Tell Me" (Featuring Before Dark)	1998	Tyrese Gibson	Tyrese
"What'cha Gonna Do?"	1998	Monifah	Mo'hogany
"You And Me"	1998	Miss Jones	The Other Woman
"Need Somebody"	1998	Miss Jones	The Other Woman
"Raindown"	1998	Miss Jones	The Other Woman
"Turn You On"	1998	Queen Latifah	Order in the Court
"15 Minutes" (#27 US, #4 R&B)	1999	Marc Nelson	Chocolate Mood
"If You Leave" (Featuring Next)	1999	Destiny's Child	The Writing's on the Wall
"Jumpin', Jumpin'" (#3 US, #8 R&B, #4 UK, #2 AUS, #6 NZ, #31 GER, #41 FR)	1999	Destiny's Child	The Writing's on the Wall
"The Brick Track Versus Gitty Up" (#22 UK, #16 AUS, #4 NZ, #64 GER, #85 FR)	1999	Salt-N-Pepa	The Best of Salt-N-Pepa
"Dear Diary"	2000	3LW	3LW
"Freak In Me" (Hidden Track)	2000	Next	Welcome II Nextasy
"Fix Me" (With Parle & Eve)	2000	Jadakiss	Shaft (soundtrack)
"Hater"	2002	Isyss	The Way We Do
"Make U Wanna Stay" (Featuring Joe Budden)	2002	Kelly Rowland	Simply Deep
"Sickalicious" (Featuring Missy Elliott)	2003	Fabolous	Street Dreams
"Good Luck Charm" (#73 US, #13 R&B)	2006	Jagged Edge	Jagged Edge
"Dog Love" (Featuring Amerie & Janyce)	2006	DMX	Year of the Dog... Again
"On My Mind" (With Sidepiece) (#17 US Dance, #57 UK)	2022	Diplo	Diplo

=== Executive-produced projects ===
Albums with more than 90% Chad Elliott production/songwriting credits, showing year released and album name
Album	Artist	Year	Label
Credentials	Rufus Blaq	1998	A&M Records

== Awards and nominations ==
Year	Ceremony	Award	Result	Ref
2001	SESAC Awards	Most Performed R&B/Hip Songs (Jumpin', Jumpin')	Won	
2002	SESAC Awards	Most Performed Pop Songs (Jumpin', Jumpin')	Won	
