= Pepa (rapper) =

Jamaican-born American rapper

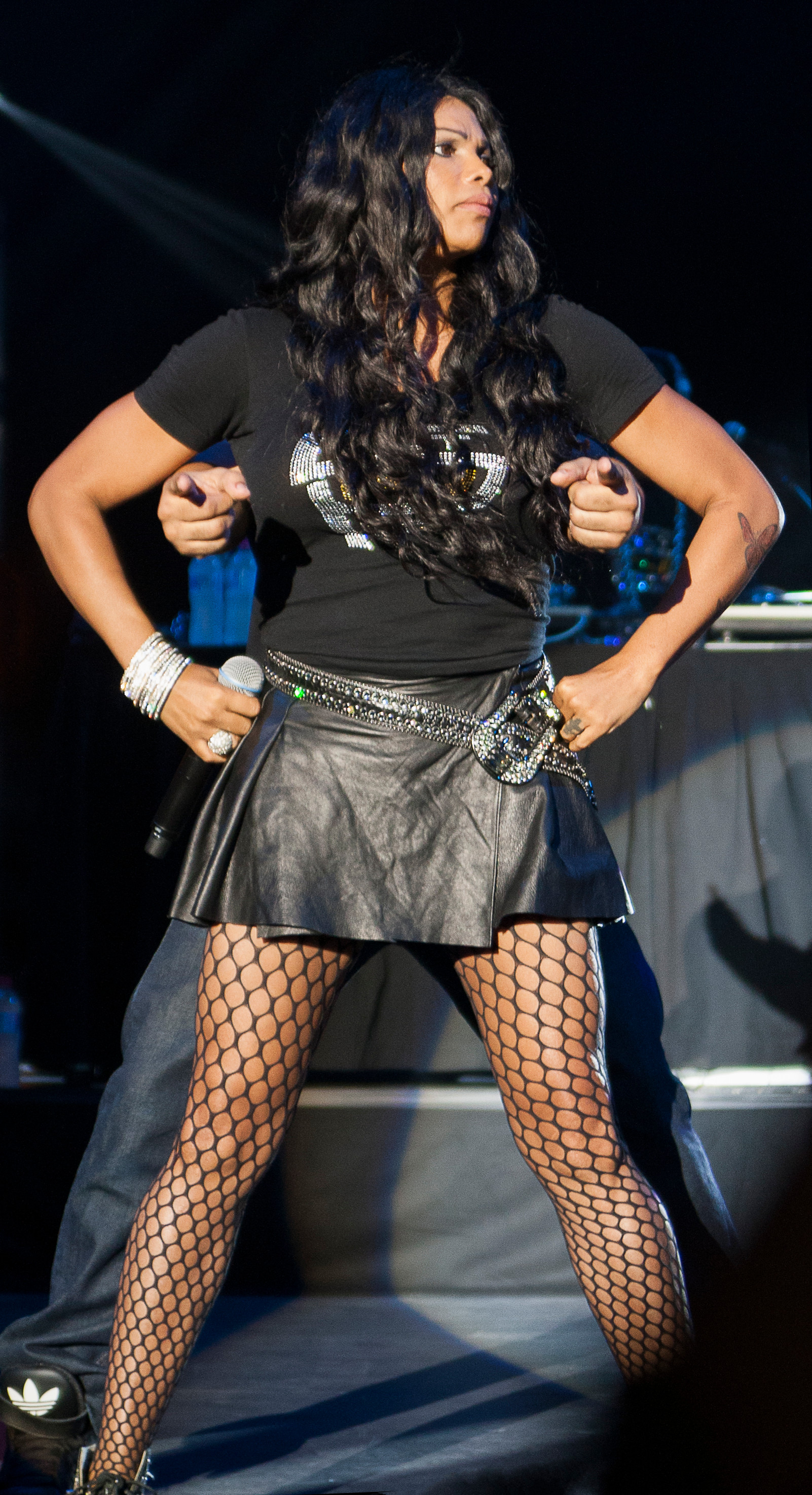
- Pepa performing with Salt-N-Pepa at the Canberra Theatre, Australia, 2013
- Born: Sandra Jacqueline Denton; 9 November 1964 (age 62) or 9 November 1969 (age 57) (sources differ); Kingston, Jamaica
- Other names: Pepa; Sandy Denton; Pep; Sandi
- Occupations: Rapper; singer; actress
- Years active: 1985–present
- Spouse: Treach (m. 1999; div. 2001)
- Children: 2
- Musical career
- Origin: Queens, New York City, U.S.
- Genres: Hip hop; dance; pop
- Instrument: Vocals
- Labels: Next Plateau; London; PolyGram; Red Ant
- Member of: Salt-N-Pepa

Sandra Jacqueline Denton (born 9 November 1964 or 1969), better known by her stage name Pepa or Pep, is a Jamaican-American rapper, best known for her work as a member of the female rap trio Salt-N-Pepa. Denton starred in The Salt-N-Pepa Show, a reality TV series focusing on reforming the group which aired on the VH1 network in 2008. Since January 2016, Denton has appeared as a supporting cast member on the music reality television show Growing Up Hip Hop which airs on We TV.

== Early life ==
Sandra Jacqueline Denton was born in Kingston, Jamaica to Charles and Enid Denton (née Hyacinth), the youngest of eight children. Denton lived on a farm in Jamaica with her grandmother until she was six years old. Denton's family moved to St. Albans, Queens, New York, when she was three; and she later joined them. Denton has been a performer since childhood. Denton was molested as a child. Denton released a book about her life in 2008 entitled Let's Talk About Pep in which she talked about being molested, her many abusive relationships, and how Salt-N-Pepa formed.

In 1979, 15-year-old Denton was sent to live with her elder sister Patsy in Logan, Utah, when her family home in Queens caught fire and so she could have a better life. According to Denton, she was the only Black student attending Logan High School during that time. Denton became inspired by rock music; citing AC/DC and Led Zeppelin as her inspirations during her time in Utah. After a year in Utah, Denton returned to New York, later graduating from Springfield Gardens High School.

Denton worked in a call center at a Sears in College Point. She met Cheryl James in the Sears lunchroom. They both were also enrolled as nursing students at Queensborough Community College.

== Career ==
With the production by Hurby "Luv Bug" Azor whom she and James met while working as customer service representatives at Sears, James and Denton released a single called "The Showstopper" which became a moderate R&B hit in late 1985. They were joined with Latoya Hanson who was the original DJ of the group. Shortly after in 1986, Deidra "Spinderella" Roper joined as the group's DJ as a full-length debut album, Hot, Cool & Vicious, was being released. The trio released a total of five studio albums: Hot, Cool, and Vicious (1986), A Salt with a Deadly Pepa (1988), Blacks' Magic (1990), Very Necessary (1993), and Brand New (1997), plus several greatest hits albums. Salt-N-Pepa disbanded in 2002, several months after their Brand New album was released on Red Ant Records. Denton's co-group member Cheryl James had stated she was ready to leave the music industry. The trio reunited for a performance on VH1's Hip Hop Honors program on 22 September 2005. In 2005, Denton was a cast member of VH1's The Surreal Life (season 5).

Denton's acting credits also include the motion picture Joe's Apartment, an appearance in the HBO movie First Time Felon, and a stint as Officer Andrea Phelan on the HBO drama, Oz. She starred on The Surreal Life: Fame Games.

Salt-N-Pepa reformed in 2008 after disbanding in 2002.

Denton teamed up with James for VH1's The Salt-N-Pepa Show. She starred in her own reality show on the network entitled Let's Talk About Pep, word-play on the group's hit song "Let's Talk About Sex". She can be heard speaking Jamaican Patois in the song "Need U Bad" by Jazmine Sullivan. In August 2008, Denton released her autobiography, which was also entitled Let's Talk About Pep. It was co-written by Karen Hunter, and it offered a look behind the fame, family, failures, and successes of her life in one of hip-hop's most successful groups. It features an introduction by Queen Latifah, and an epilogue by Missy Elliott. To accommodate the book, Pepa launched her own social network for her fans. On 23 October 2008, Salt-N-Pepa performed at the BET Hip Hop Awards. In January 2011, Denton appeared in an episode of the TBS sitcom Are We There Yet? as Tammy, a woman who falls for the Terry Crews character of Nick. Denton joined the reality television show Growing Up Hip Hop as a supporting cast member in January 2016 along with her daughter Egypt (a main cast member) and niece Tahira Francis.

In 2025, Denton was inducted into Rock and Roll Hall of Fame as a member of Salt-N-Pepa.

== Personal life ==
Denton dated and was engaged to rapper Prince Markie Dee sometime during the mid-1980s. She also briefly dated actor Will Smith.

On 6 July 1990, Denton gave birth to her first child, a son she had with New York rapper Tyran "Tah-Tah" Moore whom she named Tyran Denton Jr. She made a guest appearance on Ricki Lake in 1994, teaching teenage girls the responsibilities of being a mother.

Denton was the owner of HollyHood, a retail clothing store in the Buckhead section of Atlanta, Georgia, which opened in November 1995.

On 2 April 1999, Denton married Treach (whose real name is Anthony Criss) of the rap group Naughty by Nature at a Lawrence, Kansas tattoo parlor after dating on and off for seven years. Their "real wedding" was held at their home in Morristown, New Jersey, on 24 July 1999. Denton and Treach had one daughter, Egypt Jahnari Criss (born 2 September 1998). After allegations of physical abuse inflicted by Treach, they divorced in 2001.

== Discography ==
Studio albums

- Hot, Cool & Vicious (1986)
- A Salt with a Deadly Pepa (1988)
- Blacks' Magic (1990)
- Very Necessary (1993)
- Brand New (1997)

== Filmography ==
Year	Title	Role	Notes
1992	Stay Tuned	Herself (with Salt-N-Pepa)	
1993	Who's the Man?	Sherise	
1996	Joe's Apartment	Blank	
1997	First Time Felon	Laverne	
1997	Happily Ever After: Fairy Tales for Every Child	Little Kitten (Voice)	Episode: Mother Goose
2000	Linc's	Herself	Episode: "The Music In Me"
2000–2003	Oz	Officer Andrea Phelan	6 episodes
2001	3 A.M.	Ellen	
2002	Love and a Bullet	Female with cue stick	
2002	Book of Love	Herself	
2007	The Perfect Holiday	V-Jay	
2010	Let's Talk About Pep	Herself	8 episodes
2011	Are We There Yet?	Tammy	Episode: "The Oh No She Di-in't Episode"
2011	Queen of Media	Herself	
2014	Sharknado 2: The Second One	Polly	
2015	Family Time	Herself	Episode: "Salt N' Spice N' Pepa"
2015	Cookin' with Salt-N-Pepa	Herself	7 episodes
2015	Lip Sync Battle	Herself	Episode: "Sandra Denton vs. Cheryl James"
2017	Sandy Wexler	Testimonial	
