= Bulletproof (1996 soundtrack) =

Music From the Motion Picture Bulletproof

Soundtrack album to Bulletproof by various artists
- Released: September 3, 1996
- Recorded: 1995–1996
- Genres: Hip hop; R&B
- Length: 52:25
- Label: MCA Soundtracks
- Producers: Aqil Davidson; Big Dex; Carl Sturken and Evan Rogers; Chucky Thompson; Hurby Azor; I-Roc; Jamey Jaz; Jammin' James Carter; Jon-John Robinson; Kirv; Mario Caldato Jr.; Mickey Petralia; Salt; The Crystal Method

Singles from Bulletproof
- 1. "Champagne" Released: 1996

Professional ratings
Review scores
Source	Rating
AllMusic	2/5 stars

Music From The Motion Picture Bulletproof is the soundtrack to Ernest Dickerson's 1996 action comedy film Bulletproof. It was released on September 3, 1996, through MCA Soundtracks and contained mainly hip hop and R&B music. The album peaked at No. 85 on the Billboard 200 and No. 23 on the Top R&B Albums and featured five charting singles "Champagne", "Where I'm From", "Where You Are", "Until The Day", and "How Could You".

== Track listing ==
No.	Title	Producer(s)	Length
1.	"Champagne" (performed by Salt-N-Pepa)	Hurby Azor; Salt; Dr. Ceuss (co.)	3:19
2.	"Plant a Seed" (performed by Lost Boyz)	Big Dex	3:27
3.	"Where I'm From (Don't Fight The Clean Mix II)" (performed by Passion)	Kirv	4:13
4.	"Tha 2 of Us" (performed by Don't Try To Xerox and Christopher Williams)	I-Roc; Jammin' James Carter	4:05
5.	"Until the Day" (performed by Nonchalant)	Chucky Thompson	4:47
6.	"How Could You" (performed by K-Ci & JoJo)	Jon-John; Joey Elias (co.)	5:02
7.	"I Wanna Know Your Name" (performed by Tasha Holiday)	Carl Sturken and Evan Rogers	4:42
8.	"Where You Are" (performed by Rahsaan Patterson)	Jamey Jaz	5:14
9.	"Chocolate (Cuties and Condoms)" (performed by Cydal and Adina Howard)		4:22
10.	"Tha Show" (performed by Wreckx-n-Effect and Heat)	Aqil Davidson	5:11
11.	"Tres Delinquentes (Rock Mix)" (performed by Delinquent Habits and Sen Dog)	Mario Caldato Jr.; Mickey Petralia	3:32
12.	"Reverend Black Grape (The Crystal Method Remix)" (performed by Black Grape)	The Crystal Method	4:31
Total length:			52:25

== Charts ==
Chart (1996)	Peak position
US Billboard 200	85
US Top R&B Albums (Billboard)	23
