= DJ Spinderella =

American DJ and rapper (born 1970)

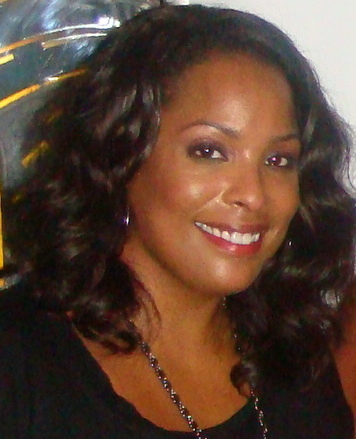
- DJ Spinderella in 2011
- Born: Deidra Muriel Roper; August 3, 1970 (age 56); Brooklyn, New York City, U.S.
- Other names: Dee Dee Roper; DJ Spin; Spin; Spiny
- Occupations: DJ; producer; rapper
- Spouse: Quenton Coleman (m. 2021)
- Children: 1
- Musical career
- Genres: Hip hop; dance; pop
- Instruments: Vocals; turntables
- Years active: 1986–present
- Labels: Next Plateau; London; PolyGram; Red Ant
- Formerly of: Salt-N-Pepa

Deidra Muriel Roper (born August 3, 1970), known professionally as DJ Spinderella or simply Spinderella, is an American DJ, rapper, and producer. She is best known as a member of the hip-hop group Salt-N-Pepa. Roper occasionally appeared on The Salt-n-Pepa Show, a reality TV series that focused on reforming the group, which aired on the VH1 network in 2008.

== Early life ==
Deidra Muriel Roper was born August 3, 1970, (Note: Other sources state 1971.) and raised in Brooklyn, New York City, as one of five children. Her early influence in music began as a child, fascinated by her father's record collection growing up. Roper began her career as a DJ at age 14. During her sophomore year in high school, she began dating a local DJ from whom she learned DJ techniques. Shortly thereafter, she began marketing herself as a DJ in the area around Brooklyn. At age 16, Roper was approached in school by a classmate who asked her if she would be interested in joining an all-female rap group. The classmate knew Hurby "LuvBug" Azor, the producer of the group, and arranged for Roper to audition for him.

== Career ==
Roper was introduced to Salt-N-Pepa producer Hurby Azor just before the group was due to appear at the Westchester Music Festival in 1986. The group's original DJ, Latoya Hanson, had missed several rehearsals and group appearances, and the group was looking for a replacement. Future radio and TV personality Wendy Williams had also auditioned as the DJ. Roper was selected as the group's DJ by Azor (taking the name Spinderella) around the time the group's first album was being released. Since she was 16 at the time of joining, her parents had to permit her to travel around the country. The trio became one of the most successful female hip-hop acts of all time. They released five studio albums and saw several platinum and gold singles, with Spinderella producing several songs on the group's albums as well. In 1992, Spinderella appeared in the film Stay Tuned. In 1993, she was featured as a rapper on Big Daddy Kane's album Looks Like a Job For... on the second single, "Very Special", which would go on to become Big Daddy Kane's only top 40 hit. In 1996, Spinderella appeared in the film Kazaam, which starred Shaquille O'Neal. She opened her own beauty salon on October 21, 1997, the same day that Salt-N-Pepa released their final album Brand New. After this album, Spinderella made plans to release a solo album, which never materialized as Red Ant, the group's record label, ceased operations. Salt-N-Pepa disbanded in 2002 and reformed in 2007, eventually firing Spinderella in 2019.

From 2003 to 2006, Spinderella worked as a radio personality on the now-defunct KKBT 100.3 in Los Angeles, co-hosting The BackSpin, a nationally syndicated weekly radio show featuring old school hip-hop. She appeared in several episodes of the VH1 series The Salt N Pepa Show. From September 2010 to March 2011, she did mid-days at KSOC-94.5 "K-Soul" in Dallas, Texas. Spinderella is part of the American Diabetes Association Celebrity Cabinet, a TV ONE UnSung Ambassador, supporter of Saving Our Daughters Mentoring Program, and founder of the Spinderella DJ Academy. She appeared briefly on VH1's first annual Hip Hop Honors in November 2004, with her group members, but they did not perform. All three members performed on the second Hip Hop Honors on September 22, 2005. This was the trio's first performance as Salt-N-Pepa since 1999. In 2007, she acted as DJ for The Comedy Central Roast of Flavor Flav. In October 2008, the group performed their hit singles "Shoop", "Push It", and "Whatta Man" at the 2008 BET Hip Hop Awards. When the group appeared on The Wendy Williams Show to perform "Push It" on December 18, 2015, host Wendy Williams tried her hand at DJ'ing before Spinderella came out to continue in the role. On May 3, 2019, Spinderella announced in an Instagram post that she had been "terminated" from Salt-N-Pepa as of January 2019, and had broken her silence after the band hadn't made a public announcement regarding their parting of ways.. As of 2026, Spinderella is performing in the It's Iconic Tour along with Salt-N-Pepa, En Vogue and TLC.

Roper was inducted to the Rock and Roll Hall of Fame in 2025 as a member of Salt-N-Pepa, the first female DJ so honored.

== Personal life ==
In 1992, Roper had her first and only child, a daughter named Christy, with NBA player Kenny Anderson. Christy later appeared on an episode of My Super Sweet 16. In May 2021, Roper married her long time boyfriend, Quenton "Q" Coleman, who is a comedian. She is an honorary member of Sigma Gamma Rho sorority.
