= Shoop =

1993 single by Salt-n-Pepa

Single by Salt-N-Pepa

from the album Very Necessary
- Released: September 21, 1993
- Genre: Hip hop
- Length: 4:09
- Label: Next Plateau
- Songwriters: Sandra Denton; Cheryl James
- Producers: Pepa; Salt; Mark Sparks

Salt-N-Pepa singles chronology
"Start Me Up" (1992)	"Shoop" (1993)	"Whatta Man" (1993)

Music video
- "Shoop" on YouTube

"Shoop" is the lead single released from American hip hop group Salt-N-Pepa's fourth studio album, Very Necessary (1993). The song was produced by group members Sandra "Pepa" Denton and Cheryl "Salt" James with Mark Sparks. Released in September 1993, by Next Plateau, the song became one of the group's more successful singles, reaching numbers four and five on the US Billboard Hot 100 and Cash Box Top 100 and topping the Billboard Hot Rap Singles chart. Two months after its release, "Shoop" was certified gold by the Recording Industry Association of America (RIAA); it went on to sell 1.2 million copies. Its accompanying music video was directed by Scott Kalvert. The success of both this single and the follow-up single "Whatta Man" propelled Very Necessary to sell over five million copies in the US, becoming the group's best-selling album.

This song uses a sample of the Sweet Inspirations version of the Ikettes's "I'm Blue (The Gong-Gong Song)", and the line "the voodoo that you do so well" was quoted from Cole Porter's 1929 song "You Do Something to Me".

== Background and composition ==
Pepa stated: "The concept for 'Shoop' started with me chillin' in Queens, riding around in the car and I'm telling the story of how 'I saw a brother, I had to kick it to, I'm not shy so I asked for the digits and that does not make me a hoe.' This story became the song and the inspiration for the first verse." She also commented: "I had to jump through hoops for 'Shoop' to be the first single off the Very Necessary album. The label gave me a lot of push back since Hurby [Luv Bug] didn't produce or write the song. Ultimately, it was an undeniable hit that took Salt-N-Pepa to the next level, and solidified our worth to hip-hop. Such a dope feeling."

Salt stated: "The objective was to turn the tables on men – make them the objects. When writing my verses, I was thinking of tongue in cheek ways to objectify men. When you really like a song, it's easy to record. Fun fact: I had my daughter Corin in my arms while recording 'Shoop.'"

"Shoop" features an uncredited verse by Otwane Roberts.

== Critical reception ==
Larry Flick from Billboard magazine named the song a "funky, funky midtempo jam", noting that it "teases and breezes over sexy, shuffling beats." John Martinucci from the Gavin Report stated, "Over the years they have delivered some cool tracks and "Shoop" is no exception. Laid-back and all, the trio takes control as they scope themselves out a guy and make the moves on him. Refreshing change, `ey, guys?" In his review of Very Necessary, Dennis Hunt from Los Angeles Times wrote, "By far, the best song is the loping "Shoop", which bristles with a swagger missing on the other tracks." Push from Melody Maker praised "Shoop" as "snakey, funky, sexy fun". Pan-European magazine Music & Media felt it has "a spicey poppy rap style we had almost forgotten." Alan Jones from Music Week gave the song a score of four out of five and named it Pick of the Week, declaring it as "a perfect showcase for the rappers, who feed off each other well, and with great humour."

Wendi Cermak from The Network Forty noted that here, "a funky low groove rolls along under smooth rap." Touré from The New York Times called it "a sexy little tribute to the male bodies that drive these rappers crazy", "pulsing with a funky bass line". A reviewer from People magazine wrote that "Shoop" "is a grinding, bluesy come-on that overflows with good-natured lewdness." In a retrospective review, Pop Rescue stated the song has "a wonderful beat vs rap relationship going on here". James Hamilton from the RM Dance Update named it a "Ikettes 'I'm Blue' based (that's Tina you can hear) funkily rolling sexy lurcher" in his weekly dance column. Tom Doyle from Smash Hits also gave it four out of five, describing it as a "stomping rap thing" and "another dance classic". He found that the chorus "simultaneously manages to go 'shoop shoop shoop' and rip off the 'whoah whoah whoah' bit from the Stereo MC's' 'Connected'."

== Music video ==
The song's music video was directed by American director Scott Kalvert. It was filmed at Coney Island and begins with Salt 'N' Pepa driving up in a Mercedes convertible at the beach and later flirting with some men. They also sing on an illuminated set as they dance with dancers which included all costume jewelry by Ziggy Attias, Ziggy Originals, NYC. Charles Aaron from Spin commented on the video, "Flipping the sexist script, the queens of hip hop display their own well-toned talents. While lounging at the beach, they appreciate a plethora of spandex-bottomed fellas. Joyous, equal-opportunity physicality. The butt equivalent of Queen Latifah's 'Ladies First'."

Salt recalled: "When shooting 'Shoop' I was a bit self conscious. It was hard being in a bathing suit and my booty kept falling out of my shorts when we were dancing on stage."

== Impact and legacy ==
In June 1994, "Shoop" won one of ASCAP's R&B Music Awards. In 1999, The Village Voice listed it number 62 on its list of the Top Singles of the 1990s. In 2019, Insider ranked it among the Best Songs from the '90s, stating that "this catchy song helped make Salt-N-Pepa bonafide stars and marked the beginnings of their artistic freedom." In October 2023, Billboard magazine listed it number 239 on their list of the 500 Best Pop Songs of All Time, writing, "We can all decide for ourselves what the word 'Shoop' means here ("It's a whole vibe", Pepa demurred in an interview), but we do know the rap duo flipped the script by lyrically lusting over male bodies instead of the typical female objectification of hip-hop."

The song would gain a renewed popularity with its use as one of the prominent songs in the 2016 film Deadpool (including playing over the film's end credits), to the point the duo would perform the song at the 2016 MTV Movie Awards when lead actor Ryan Reynolds won for Best Comedic Performance. The use was approved by Pepa, as she is a noted comic book fan, and was suggested by the film's executive producer Aditya Sood. Salt and Pepa themselves admitted the use contributed to an increase in 1990s-born followers in their performance audiences.

== Track listing ==
- Maxi single
1. "Shoop" – (LP version)
2. "Shoop" – (Guru's version)
3. "Shoop" – (Danny D's R & B mix)
4. "Let's Talk About AIDS"
5. "Shoop" – (TRUE instrumental)
6. "Shoop" – (a cappella)
7. "Emphatically No"
8. "I've Got AIDS" – (public service announcement)

== Charts ==
=== Weekly charts ===
Chart (1993–1994)	Peak position
Australia (ARIA)	2
Belgium (Ultratop 50 Flanders)	35
Canada Retail Singles (The Record)	2
Canada Dance/Urban (RPM)	5
Denmark (IFPI)	20
Europe (Eurochart Hot 100)	48
Europe (European Dance Radio)	2
France (SNEP)	99
Germany (GfK)	46
Iceland (Íslenski Listinn Topp 40)	16
Ireland (IRMA)	18
Israel (Israeli Singles Chart)	29
Netherlands (Dutch Top 40)	12
Netherlands (Single Top 100)	19
New Zealand (Recorded Music NZ)	31
Scottish Singles Sales (Official Charts)	30
Sweden (Sverigetopplistan)	38
Switzerland (Schweizer Hitparade)	23
UK Singles (Official Charts)	13
UK Airplay (Music Week)	16
UK Dance (Music Week)	4
UK Club Chart (Music Week)	41
US Billboard Hot 100	4
US Hot R&B/Hip-Hop Songs (Billboard)	3
US Pop Airplay (Billboard)	15
US Hot Rap Songs (Billboard)	1
US Maxi-Singles Sales (Billboard)	1
US Rhythmic Airplay (Billboard)	1
US Cash Box Top 100	5

=== Year-end charts ===
Chart (1993)	Position
Australia (ARIA)	69
US Hot R&B Singles (Billboard)	93

Chart (1994)	Position
Australia (ARIA)	15
Brazil (Mais Tocadas)	35
Netherlands (Dutch Top 40)	122
UK Singles (OCC)	132
US Billboard Hot 100	29
US Hot R&B Singles (Billboard)	37
US Hot Rap Singles (Billboard)	18
US Maxi-Singles Sales (Billboard)	32
US Cash Box Top 100	23
US Urban Singles (Cash Box)	45

== Certifications and sales ==
Region	Certification	Certified units/sales
New Zealand (RMNZ)	2× Platinum	60,000^{‡}
United Kingdom (BPI)	Gold	400,000^{‡}
United States (RIAA) physical	Gold	1,200,000
United States digital	—	615,280
^{‡} Sales+streaming figures based on certification alone.

== Release history ==
Region	Date	Format(s)	Label(s)	Ref.
United States	September 21, 1993	7-inch vinyl; 12-inch vinyl; CD; cassette	Next Plateau	
United Kingdom	September 27, 1993	7-inch vinyl; 12-inch vinyl; CD; cassette	FFRR	
Australia	October 11, 1993	CD; cassette	FFRR; Polydor	
Japan	October 25, 1993	Mini-CD	London; FFRR	
United Kingdom (re-release)	May 16, 1994	12-inch vinyl; CD; cassette	FFRR	
