= Start Me Up (Salt-n-Pepa song) =

1992 single by Salt-n-Pepa

Single by Salt-N-Pepa

from the album Stay Tuned: Music from and Inspired by the Motion Picture
- Released: September 21, 1992
- Length: 3:39
- Label: Next Plateau Entertainment; London
- Songwriters: Hurby Azor; Steve Azor; Miguel Angelo Guerrero
- Producer: Hurby Luv Bug

Salt-N-Pepa singles chronology
"Expression (92 remix)" (1992)	"Start Me Up" (1992)	"Shoop" (1993)

"Start Me Up" is a song by American R&B and hip-hop group Salt-N-Pepa, released in 1992 by Next Plateau and London Records. The song is written by Hurby Azor, Steve Azor and Miguel Angelo Guerrero, and produced by Hurby Luv Bug. It is included in the 1992 American film Stay Tuned, starring John Ritter and Pam Dawber, and later appeared on Salt-N-Pepa's 1999 compilation album, The Best of Salt-N-Pepa.

== Track listing ==
- Maxi-CD
1. "Start Me Up" (radio edit) – 3:39
2. "Start Me Up" (alternative edit) – 3:58
3. "Start Me Up" (original version) – 3:48
4. "Start Me Up" (club version) – 5:44
5. "Start Me Up" (DJ's Choice) – 4:28

== Charts ==
Chart (1992)	Peak position
Austria (Ö3 Austria Top 40)	30
Europe (Eurochart Hot 100)	77
Europe (European Dance Radio)	10
Germany (GfK)	44
Netherlands (Dutch Top 40)	24
Netherlands (Single Top 100)	23
UK Singles (Official Charts)	39
UK Airplay (Music Week)	22
UK Dance (Music Week)	24
UK Club Chart (Music Week)	77
US Hot R&B/Hip-Hop Songs (Billboard)	84
