= Let's Talk About Pep =

2013 American reality TV series

- Genre: Reality
- Country of origin: United States
- Original language: English
- No. of seasons: 1
- No. of episodes: 8

Production
- Running time: 60 mins.
- Production company: Left/Right Productions

Original release
- Network: VH1
- Release: January 11 – March 1, 2010

Let's Talk About Pep is an American reality television series that aired for one season, from January 11 until March 1, 2010.

== Premise ==
Sandra "Peppa/Pep" Denton, member of rap hip hop group Salt-n-Pepa, and her friends test the dating scene in New York.

== Cast ==
- Sandra "Pep" Denton
- Joumana Kidd
- Jacque Reid
- Kali Troy

== Episodes ==
No.	Title	Original release date
1	"Episode 1"	January 11, 2010
Pep goes out with an NFL player.
2	"Episode 2"	January 18, 2010
Essence magazine follows Pep on a night out on the town. Joumana's boyfriend takes her on a wild night.
3	"Episode 3"	January 25, 2010
Pep goes out with an actor who reveals that he is still friends with his ex.
4	"Episode 4"	February 1, 2010
Pep spends the night with a man who is a doctor and a gourmet chef. A young NFL player goes after Joumana.
5	"Episode 5"	February 8, 2010
Kittie rescues Joumana from a bad boy. Jacque goes out with a man with a scary past.
6	"Episode 6"	February 15, 2010
Pep introduces Tom to her friends. Joumana goes out with a boxer.
7	"Episode 7"	February 22, 2010
Jacque cyberstalks Joel.
8	"Episode 8"	March 1, 2010
Pep decides to take it to the next step with Tom. Markuann changes his tactics when pursuing Kitty. Joumana has had enough of bad boys.
