= Rufus Blaq =

American singer-songwriter

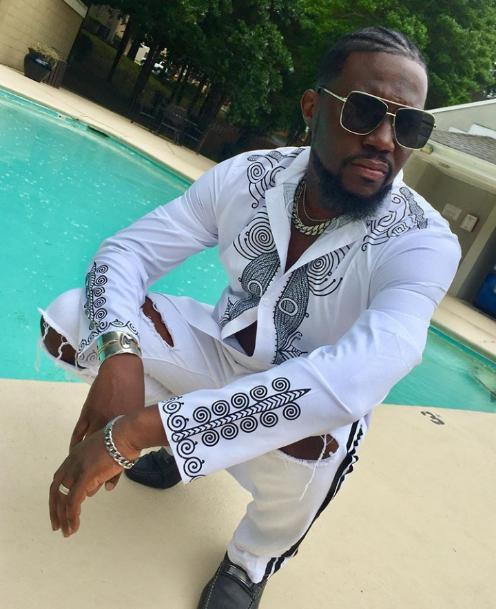

Background information
- Also known as: Peekaboo, Mr. Blaq, Daddy Blaq, Electric Pretty, Blaq The Ripper
- Born: Rufus Tadaryl Moore; August 26, 1972 (age 54); Youngstown, Ohio U.S.
- Origin: Atlanta & Brooklyn, NYC U.S.
- Genres: Hip-Hop, R&B, Pop, Neo-Soul
- Occupations: Rap artist, singer, songwriter, record producer
- Instruments: Vocals, Piano
- Years active: 1993-Present
- Labels: Giant Records, Perspective A&M Records, Kolbalt Music

Rufus Blaq (born Rufus Tadaryl Moore; 1972) is an American rap artist, singer, songwriter and record producer. He has songwriting credits on records for Faith Evans, Angie Stone, Omarion, Queen Latifah, Marques Houston, and Salt-N-Pepa. He is most known for his single "Out of Sight (Yo)." He is also credited as Rufus Moore, Peekaboo, Mr. Blaq, Daddy Blaq, Electric Pretty, and Blaq The Ripper.

== Early life ==
Rufus Blaq (nee Rufus Moore) was born in Youngstown, Ohio, on August 26, 1972.

== Career ==
At the age of 17, Rufus moved from Youngstown to Atlanta. He became a resident act at the nightclub The Phoenix. Producer Dallas Austin introduced him to Erick Sermon.

In 1993, Blaq started writing for rap groups Kronic (signed to RCA Records and Lil Zane was a member) and hip-hop group Another Bad Creation. While writing for Cartoon Kaperz, Rufus was introduced to Chad Elliott. Blaq worked with Elliot on Bobby Brown’s artist, Stylez.

During this time, Rufus Moore transitioned his name to Rufus Blaq. "Blaq" was to pay homage to his people and the "Q" represents quality.

Blaq has worked with a number of artists including Olivia, Angie Stone, Faith Evans, Destiny's Child, Bow Wow, Omarion, Marques Houston, Young Rome, Salt-n-Pepa, Queen Latifah, Tichina Arnold, and B2K.

In 1997, Rufus had success with Salt-n-Pepa's single "Gitty Up" & "R U Ready" as a songwriter and featured artist. "Gitty Up" peaked at 31 on Billboard's Hot 100 Chart. Rufus achieved his first Top 3 Billboard Hot 100 single in 1999 with Destiny Child's "Jumpin Jumpin". He co-wrote the hit song with Chad Elliott and Beyonce.

Rufus worked with Chad Elliott, along with Al West, to help him produce Rufus' single "Out of Sight (Yo)" also known as "Outta Sight", and was featured on the Motion Picture soundtrack Ride in 1998. It peaked at 18 on Billboard's Hot 100. At the time Rufus was signed to Jimmy Jam and Terry Lewis’ label, Perspective/A&M Records and soon after he released his 1st debut album "Credentials". Rufus was a regular performer at club promoter Mark Fleischman's Los Angeles club, Century Club.

In 1998, Rufus's song "Dance For Me" was featured on the motion picture soundtrack How Stella Got Her Groove Back. The Album peaked at #8 on the Billboard 200 Chart.

In 2003, Blaq worked with engineer Chris "Tek" O'Ryan, on the You Got Served soundtrack. Blaq released a mixtape “Electric Pretty”, which was mixed and mastered by Tek's label, Tezenmusic. His follow-up mixtape “Blaq The Ripper” was released in 2015, featuring producers Easy Mo Bee, Andreao “Fanatik” Heard, Michael Angelo, Chad Elliott, Al West, as well as many featured artists including, Mc Lyte, Talib Kweli, Omarion, Young Rome. This mixtape was also mixed and mastered by Chris "Tek" O'Ryan on his label Tezenmusic.

Additionally, Blaq co-wrote and did vocals on the record "Ten Wife Commandments" on Faith Evans' album featuring the Notorious B.I.G. called “The King and I". Faith Evans was also a featured artist on Blaq's single "Show Me."

Blaq has production, writing and artist credits on Angela Bassett's Lifetime Channel bio-pic Whitney, and the motion picture and soundtrack of Total Frat Movie, which he worked on with Myke Groov. Blaq and Groov are co-owners of the production company called Project MojoBotz. In 2020, they released the track 'Medication'.

Blaq's music has also been featured on World of Dance U-Jam, the first format under the World of Dance Fitness umbrella, merging choreography of World of Dance and dance fitness. Blaq's music has been in rotation with DJ Makaio during World of Dance UnityFest 2020.

The soundtrack to the motion picture "A Familiar Lie" featuring producer/actor Omar Gooding features Rufus' song “God's Grace”.

Rufus' next project is Salt-n-Pepa and new single “Flame On” Feat Mad Lion & KRS 1.

Rufus also gives back to his hometown of Youngstown, OH, by providing guidance in entertainment and music to its citizens, co-hosting a variety show and mentoring aspiring hip-hop stars, like YO5.

== Personal life ==
Moore has two children.
