= Gitty Up (song) =

1997 single by Salt-n-Pepa

Single by Salt-N-Pepa

from the album Brand New
- Released: December 1997
- Length: 4:02
- Label: London
- Songwriters: Cheryl James; Rufus Moore; Rick James
- Producers: Al West; Chad "Dr. Ceuss" Elliott

Salt-N-Pepa singles chronology
"R U Ready" (1997)	"Gitty Up" (1997)	"The Brick Track Versus Gitty Up" (1999)

"Gitty Up" is a song by American hip hop girl group Salt-N-Pepa from their fifth studio album, Brand New (1997). It was released as the album's second and final single in December 1997.

== Track listings ==
- CD single
1. "Gitty Up" (Album Version)
2. "Gitty Up" (Bystorm Mix 1)
3. "Gitty Up" (Soul Solution Mix)
4. "Gitty Up" (Bystorm Mix 1 Instrumental)
- 12-inch single

A1. "Gitty Up" (Album Version)
A2. "Gitty Up" (Bystorm Mix 1)
A3. "Gitty Up" (Soul Solution Mix)
A4. "Gitty Up" (Bystorm Mix 1 Instrumental)
B1. "Gitty Up" (Bystorm Mix 2)
B2. "Gitty Up" (Bystorm Mix 2 Instrumental)
B3. "Gitty Up" (Album Instrumental)

== Charts ==
Chart (1997–1998)	Peak position
New Zealand (Recorded Music NZ)	22
US Billboard Hot 100	50
US Hot R&B Singles (Billboard)	31
US Hot Rap Tracks (Billboard)	9

== "The Brick Track Versus Gitty Up" ==
"The Brick Track Versus Gitty Up"

Single by Salt-N-Pepa

from the album The Best of Salt-N-Pepa
- Released: 1999
- Length: 3:13
- Label: London
- Songwriters: Roger Waters, Robert Jazayeri, Cheryl James, Rufus Moore, Rick James
- Producers: Al West, Chad "Dr Ceuss" Elliott

Salt-N-Pepa singles chronology
"Gitty Up" (1998)	"The Brick Track Versus Gitty Up" (1999)

In 1999, "Gitty Up" was remixed by Robert Jazayeri and Sean Mathers and re-released under the title "The Brick Track Versus Gitty Up" (sometimes titled "The Brick Song Versus Gitty Up"). It samples "Another Brick in the Wall Part 2" by Pink Floyd. The song was released as the first single from Salt-N-Pepa's 1999 greatest hits album, The Best of Salt-N-Pepa, and reached number four in New Zealand and number 16 in Australia. It was certified gold in both countries.

=== Track listings ===
Australian CD single

1. "The Brick Track Versus Gitty Up" (Rickidy Raw Hide radio mix) – 3:12
2. "Whatta Man" (radio edit featuring En Vogue) – 4:10
3. "Let's Talk About Sex" – 3:31
4. "Gitty Up" (original version) – 4:02

European CD single

1. "The Brick Track Versus Gitty Up" (Rickidy Raw Hide radio mix) – 3:12
2. "Gitty Up" (original version) – 4:03
3. "Push It (Again)" (DJ Tonka remix edit) – 5:18

=== Charts ===
==== Weekly charts ====
Country (1999–2000)	Peak position
Australia (ARIA)	16
France (SNEP)	85
Germany (GfK)	64
New Zealand (Recorded Music NZ)	4
Scottish Singles Sales (Official Charts)	35
Switzerland (Schweizer Hitparade)	93
UK Singles (Official Charts)	22
UK Hip Hop/R&B (Official Charts)	4

==== Year-end charts ====
Chart (2000)	Position
Australia (ARIA)	71

=== Certifications ===
Region	Certification	Certified units/sales
Australia (ARIA)	Gold	35,000^{^}
New Zealand (RMNZ)	Gold	5,000^{*}
^{*} Sales figures based on certification alone.^{^} Shipments figures based on certification alone.
