= Start Me Up (disambiguation) =

"Start Me Up" is a song by the English rock band The Rolling Stones from their 1981 album Tattoo You.

"Start Me Up" may also refer to:

- "Start Me Up" (Salt-n-Pepa song), a song by Salt-n-Pepa
- "Start Me Up" (Grey's Anatomy), episode of Grey's Anatomy
- "Start Me Up" (Instant Star episode), episode of Instant Star
- "Start Me Up" (Family Guy), an episode of season 18 of Family Guy
