= Champagne (Salt-n-Pepa song) =

1996 single by Salt-N-Pepa

Single by Salt-n-Pepa

from the album Bulletproof (1996 soundtrack)
- Released: 1996
- Genre: Hip hop
- Length: 3:19 (album version)
- Label: MCA Records
- Songwriter: Salt-n-Pepa
- Producers: Hurby Azor; Salt

Salt-n-Pepa singles chronology
"Ain't Nuthin' But a She Thing" (1995)	"Champagne" (1996)	"R U Ready" (1997)

"Champagne" is a song by American hip-hop group Salt-n-Pepa, taken from the soundtrack to the 1996 movie Bulletproof, starring Damon Wayans and Adam Sandler. The song contains elements of "Love Rollercoaster" (J. Williams, C. Satchell, L. Bonner, M. Jones, R. Middlebrooks, M. Pierce, W. Beck) as performed by The Ohio Players. It reached the top 10 in the Netherlands, and was a top-20 hit in Finland, New Zealand and Sweden, while entering the top 30 in the UK.

== Critical reception ==
Larry Flick from Billboard magazine wrote, "Riding a hypnotic guitar lick from 'Love Rollercoaster' by the Ohio Players, the enduring divas of rap return with what they do best—a lip-smacking invitation to party. The track's hook never escapes the brain, and it is strengthened by the pair's flair for cute and clever rhymes." He added that "this will keep the kids bouncing well into the fall, while stirring anticipation for the act's long-promised MCA debut disc." British Music Week rated the song three out of five, adding, "Unmistakably Salt 'N' Pepa, this lively hip hop affair is spruced up by a Seventies-style dance groove and a funky electronic voice last heard on Tupac's 'California Love'."

== Track listing ==
- CD single
1. "Champagne" (Johnny Douglas Radio Mix) – 3:46
2. "Champagne" (Album Version) – 3:19
3. "Champagne" (Johnny Douglas 12" Mix) – 7:02
4. "Champagne" (U.S. Remix) – 3:19

== Charts ==
Weekly chart performance for "Champagne"
Chart (1996–1997)	Peak position
Australia (ARIA)	68
Finland (Suomen virallinen lista)	15
Germany (Media Control)	98
Netherlands (Dutch Top 40 Tipparade)	7
Netherlands (Single Top 100)	69
New Zealand (RIANZ)	15
Scotland (OCC)	46
Sweden (Topplistan)	15
UK Singles (OCC)	23
UK Dance (Official Charts)	4
UK Hip Hop/R&B (Official Charts)	5
UK Pop Tip Club Chart (Music Week)	25
