= R U Ready =

1997 single by Salt-n-Pepa

Single by Salt-N-Pepa

from the album Brand New
- Released: August 29, 1997
- Length: 3:58
- Label: London
- Songwriters: Cheryl James; Sandra Denton; Chad Elliott; Rufus Moore; Al West; Randy Muller
- Producers: Cheryl "Salt" James; Chad "Dr. Ceuss" Elliott; West

Salt-N-Pepa singles chronology
"Champagne" (1996)	"R U Ready" (1997)	"Gitty Up" (1997)

"R U Ready" is a song by American hip hop girl group Salt-N-Pepa from their fifth studio album, Brand New (1997). It was released as the album's lead single. The song contains excerpts from "Watch Out" by Brass Construction.

== Track listings ==
- CD single
1. "R U Ready" (Album Version) – 3:50
2. "R U Ready" (Party Mix) – 3:59
3. "R U Ready" (Album Instrumental Version) – 3:50
4. "R U Ready" (Party Instrumental Mix) – 3:59
- 12-inch single

A1. "R U Ready" (Album Version)
A2. "R U Ready" (Album Instrumental Version)
B1. "R U Ready" (Party Mix)
B2. "R U Ready" (Party Instrumental Mix)
B3. "R U Ready" (Acappella)

== Charts ==
Chart (1997)	Peak position
Canada Dance/Urban (RPM)	10
Germany (GfK)	35
Scottish Singles Sales (Official Charts)	46
Switzerland (Schweizer Hitparade)	26
UK Singles (Official Charts)	24
UK Hip Hop/R&B (Official Charts)	5
US Radio Songs (Billboard)	61
US Rhythmic Airplay (Billboard)	21
