= Jumpin', Jumpin' =

2000 single by Destiny's Child

- US CD single

Single by Destiny's Child

from the album The Writing's on the Wall
- B-side: "Upside Down"
- Released: July 11, 2000
- Studio: 353 (New York); 24/7 (Houston)
- Genre: Pop; dance; R&B
- Length: 3:50
- Label: Columbia
- Songwriters: Rufus Moore; Chad Elliott; Beyoncé Knowles
- Producers: Beyoncé Knowles; Chad Elliott; Jovonn Alexander

Destiny's Child singles chronology
"Say My Name" (1999)	"Jumpin', Jumpin'" (2000)	"Independent Women Part I" (2000)

Music video
- "Jumpin', Jumpin'" on YouTube

"Jumpin', Jumpin'" is a song recorded by American group Destiny's Child for their second studio album, The Writing's on the Wall (1999). The song was co-written and co-produced by Chad Elliott and group member Beyoncé Knowles, with additional writing from Rufus Moore and production assistance from Jovonn Alexander. It was released on July 11, 2000, by Columbia Records, as the fourth and final single from The Writing's on the Wall. It was the last single to feature the vocals of original members LeToya Luckett and LaTavia Roberson. The music video for the song features the group's second lineup consisting of Knowles, Kelly Rowland and replacement members Michelle Williams and Farrah Franklin. In some territories, including the United States, single artwork for the song features the new lineup, while other territories feature older images of the previous lineup.

"Jumpin', Jumpin'" became a commercial success, peaking at number three on the US Billboard Hot 100 and entering the top 10 in Australia, Canada, Iceland, the Netherlands, New Zealand, and the United Kingdom. Critically acclaimed, the song was ranked at number 232 on Pitchfork's "Top 500 Songs of the 2000s".

== Background ==
Producer Chad "Dr. Ceuss" Elliott received a phone call from Columbia Records A&R Teresa LaBarbera Whites, who wanted him to meet "this great group in Houston" prior to the release of its debut album. He flew to Houston and met for dinner with the members of the group (Destiny's Child) and their manager Mathew Knowles, but was unable to send any productions in time for the 1998 album Destiny's Child. Elliott, alongside co-writer Rufus Moore and co-producer Jovonn Alexander, subsequently sent a disc of written tracks for potential inclusion on their second album. Elliott was compiling beats for his own rap project at the time, and accidentally sent one of his beats (with no lyrics attached) on the same disc. Beyoncé heard this song and began writing to it; Mathew Knowles then sent a rough draft of the result to Elliott, who was impressed with the melodic, syncopated-rap delivery and the "democratic" message addressed to both men and women. The completed product secured placement on that second album, The Writing's on the Wall, alongside another co-written Elliott song ("If You Leave"), and would ultimately become Elliott's highest-peaking and biggest-selling song in multiple global markets, as well as the first recording for which Beyoncé received a co-production credit.

== Composition ==
Musically, "Jumpin', Jumpin'" is an upbeat pop- and R&B-styled dance track with influences of melodic rap. Knowles sings the lead vocal in rap-like style, something she is notable for doing in Destiny's Child as well as in her subsequent solo career. Sheet music for the song shows the key of E major with a tempo of 92 beats per minute. Meanwhile, the song's chords alternate between C♯m and G♯, while the vocals span one-and-a-half octaves, from D♯_{3} to G♯_{4}.

== Commercial performance ==
"Jumpin', Jumpin'" peaked at number three on the US Billboard Hot 100 on August 19, 2000, becoming Destiny's Child's fourth top-ten hit, and remained at the position for five non-consecutive weeks. The song peaked at number one on the Hot 100 Airplay for seven consecutive weeks, becoming one of the biggest radio hits of 2000 and the group's second longest run atop the chart behind "Independent Women Part I", which reigned for nine consecutive weeks. Though the song did not reach number one on the Billboard Hot 100, it spent 16 weeks within the top ten, longer than both previous number-one hits "Bills, Bills, Bills" and "Say My Name", as well as any of the songs that prevented it from reaching the top of the chart.

In the United Kingdom, "Jumpin', Jumpin'" was a top-five hit and sold over 195,000 copies. It also achieved success when it charted at number two in Australia. In the Netherlands, "Jumpin', Jumpin'" peaked at number ten on the Dutch Single Top 100, spending a total of 14 weeks on the chart.

== Music video ==
The video for "Jumpin', Jumpin'" was directed by Joseph Kahn, who previously worked with the group on the video for "Say My Name".

The video begins with a timelapse of evening drawing on in a city, intercut with close-up shots of women putting on lip gloss and nail polish. The members of Destiny's Child are at home, getting prepared and dressed up for a night out at the club. Kelly Rowland is seen sitting on a couch, while Farrah Franklin is seen getting her dress zipped up by Michelle Williams. These shots are interspersed with shots of guys somewhere else also getting ready to go to the club; one of these is seen putting shaving cream into his hand. Throughout these interior scenes the camera moves shakily, as if hand-held. The group members get into a car, with Beyoncé behind the wheel, and drive to their destination. They pass a group of guys in a car, who u-turn and follow them until the cars meet at a stop light. Beyoncé challenges their driver to a car race, and wins. The group members arrive at the club during the "bounce" interlude and perform choreography, with the camera movement matching the song lyrics—including momentary usages of a fisheye lens effect that exaggerates the size of Beyoncé, nearest the camera. The video ends with the group dancing with other people on the dance floor.

It premiered on music video stations such as BET, MTV, and VH1 in the week ending June 12, 2000. A video for the So So Def remix began airing on BET on the week ending on July 17, 2000. This was the final music video to feature Farrah Franklin. The original music video is available on the video compilation Video Anthology, while the "So So Def Remix" is available on the video compilation The Platinum's on the Wall.

== Remixes ==
Two official urban remixes for this song exist. The Nitro remix features rapper Mr. Nitro and the So So Def remix features Lil' Bow Wow, Da Brat, and Jermaine Dupri; a music video was filmed for the latter.

The Azza's Remix of "Jumpin', Jumpin'" contains newly recorded vocals. Along with the WNBA version that was made to promote the 2000 WNBA All-Star Game, these versions are the only songs from The Writing's on the Wall that feature Farrah Franklin and Michelle Williams as all other versions of the song feature vocals from former group members LeToya Luckett and LaTavia Roberson.

== Track listings ==
US and Canadian maxi-CD single

1. "Jumpin', Jumpin'" (album version) – 3:47
2. "Jumpin', Jumpin'" (So So Def remix clean version featuring Jermaine Dupri, Da Brat, and Lil Bow Wow) – 3:45
3. "Jumpin', Jumpin'" (Maurice's Jumpin' Retro mix) – 8:20
4. "Jumpin', Jumpin'" (Azza's remix) – 5:15
5. "Upside Down" (live from VH1 Divas 2000: A Tribute to Diana Ross) – 4:09

US 2×12-inch single

A1. "Jumpin', Jumpin'" (Maurice's Jumpin' Retro mix) – 8:20
A2. "Jumpin', Jumpin'" (Azza's remix) – 5:15
B1. "Jumpin', Jumpin'" (Digital Black N Groove club mix) – 7:50
B2. "Upside Down" (live from VH1 Divas 2000: A Tribute to Diana Ross) – 4:09
C1. "Jumpin', Jumpin'" (album version) – 3:47
C2. "Jumpin', Jumpin'" (So So Def remix clean version featuring Jermaine Dupri, Da Brat, and Lil Bow Wow) – 3:45
C3. "Jumpin', Jumpin'" (remix featuring Mr. Nitro) – 4:26
C4. "Jumpin', Jumpin'" (album version instrumental) – 3:47
D1. "Jumpin', Jumpin'" (So So Def remix instrumental) – 3:45
D2. "Jumpin', Jumpin'" (remix featuring Mr. Nitro instrumental) – 4:26
D3. "Jumpin', Jumpin'" (album version a cappella) – 3:47
D4. "Jumpin', Jumpin'" (So So Def remix a cappella) – 3:40

Australian and New Zealand CD single

1. "Jumpin', Jumpin'"
2. "Say My Name" (Timbaland remix)
3. "Say My Name" (Maurice's Last Days of Disco Millennium mix)
4. "Say My Name" (Daddy D remix with rap)
5. "Say My Name" (Digital Black & Groove Club mix)

UK CD1

1. "Jumpin', Jumpin'" (album version) – 3:47
2. "Jumpin', Jumpin'" (Azza's remix) – 5:15
3. "Upside Down" (live from VH1 Divas 2000: A Tribute to Diana Ross) – 4:09

UK CD2

1. "Jumpin', Jumpin'" (Maurice's radio mix) – 4:05
2. "Say My Name" (Maurice's Last Days of Disco Millennium mix) – 7:35
3. "Bills, Bills, Bills" (Maurice's Xclusive Livegig mix) – 7:33

UK cassette single

1. "Jumpin', Jumpin'" (album version) – 3:47
2. "Jumpin', Jumpin'" (So So Def remix clean version featuring Jermaine Dupri, Da Brat, and Lil Bow Wow) – 3:45

European CD1

1. "Jumpin', Jumpin'" (album version) – 3:47
2. "Upside Down" (live from VH1 Divas 2000: A Tribute to Diana Ross) – 4:09

European CD2

1. "Jumpin', Jumpin'" (album version) – 3:47
2. "Jumpin', Jumpin'" (So So Def remix clean version featuring Jermaine Dupri, Da Brat, and Lil Bow Wow) – 3:45
3. "Upside Down" (live from VH1 Divas 2000: A Tribute to Diana Ross) – 4:09
4. "Jumpin', Jumpin'" (Maurice's radio mix) – 4:05

== Credits and personnel ==
Credits are taken from The Writing's on the Wall album booklet.

Studios

- Recorded at 353 Studio (New York City) and 24/7 Studio (Houston, Texas)
- Mixed at Sony Studios (New York City)

Personnel

- Rufus Moore – writing
- Chad Elliott – writing, production, mixing
- Beyoncé Knowles – writing, production
- Byron Rittenhouse – male voice
- Jovonn Alexander – production
- David Donaldson – engineering
- Andre DeBourg – engineering
- Charles Alexander – engineering

== Charts ==
=== Weekly charts ===
Weekly chart performance for "Jumpin', Jumpin'"
Chart (2000)	Peak position
Australia (ARIA)	2
Belgium (Ultratop 50 Flanders)	31
Belgium (Ultratop 50 Wallonia)	25
Canada Top Singles (RPM)	8
Canada Dance/Urban (RPM)	3
Canada (Nielsen SoundScan)	6
Europe (Eurochart Hot 100)	20
France (SNEP)	41
Germany (GfK)	31
Iceland (Íslenski Listinn Topp 40)	5
Ireland (IRMA)	18
Netherlands (Dutch Top 40)	5
Netherlands (Single Top 100)	10
New Zealand (Recorded Music NZ)	6
Scottish Singles Sales (Official Charts)	12
Sweden (Sverigetopplistan)	24
Switzerland (Schweizer Hitparade)	44
UK Singles (Official Charts)	5
UK Hip Hop/R&B (Official Charts)	1
US Billboard Hot 100	3
US Hot R&B/Hip-Hop Songs (Billboard)	8
US Pop Airplay (Billboard)	1
US Rhythmic Airplay (Billboard)	3
US CHR/Pop (Radio & Records)	1
US CHR/Rhythmic (Radio & Records)	4
US Urban (Radio & Records)	4

=== Year-end charts ===
2000 year-end chart performance for "Jumpin', Jumpin'"
Chart (2000)	Position
Australia (ARIA)	17
Belgium (Ultratop 50 Wallonia)	84
France (SNEP)	99
Iceland (Íslenski Listinn Topp 40)	75
Netherlands (Dutch Top 40)	61
Netherlands (Single Top 100)	85
New Zealand (RIANZ)	41
UK Singles (OCC)	96
UK Urban (Music Week)	38
US Billboard Hot 100	13
US Hot R&B/Hip-Hop Singles & Tracks (Billboard)	39
US Mainstream Top 40 (Billboard)	10
US Maxi-Singles Sales (Billboard)	4
US Rhythmic Top 40 (Billboard)	5

2001 year-end chart performance for "Jumpin', Jumpin'"
Chart (2001)	Position
Canada (Nielsen SoundScan)	155
US Maxi-Singles Sales (Billboard)	20

== Certifications ==
Certifications for "Jumpin', Jumpin'"
Region	Certification	Certified units/sales
Australia (ARIA)	Platinum	70,000^{^}
New Zealand (RMNZ)	Platinum	30,000^{‡}
United Kingdom (BPI)	Platinum	600,000^{‡}
United States (RIAA)	Platinum	1,000,000^{‡}
^{^} Shipments figures based on certification alone.^{‡} Sales+streaming figures based on certification alone.

== Release history ==
Release dates and formats for "Jumpin', Jumpin'"
Region	Date	Format(s)	Label(s)	Ref.
United States	April 2000	Promotional recording	Columbia	
Australia	July 11, 2000	Maxi CD	Sony Music	
France	July 17, 2000	12-inch vinyl	Sony Music	
United Kingdom	July 17, 2000	Cassette; two maxi CDs	Columbia	
United States	July 18, 2000	12-inch vinyl; maxi CD	Columbia	
Germany	August 28, 2000	Maxi CD	Sony Music	
France	September 26, 2000	CD	Sony Music	

== See also ==
- List of Billboard Mainstream Top 40 number-one songs of 2000
- List of UK R&B Singles Chart number ones of 2000
