= Brand New (Salt-n-Pepa album) =

Studio album by Salt-N-Pepa
- Released: October 21, 1997
- Studios: Axis (New York City) (Note: Tracks 1, 4, 10 and 11); Quad (New York City) (Note: Track 1); Soundtrack (New York City) (Note: Tracks 1, 5 and 8); The Music Palace (West Hempstead, New York) (Note: Tracks 2, 11 and 13); The Basement, Inc. (Dix Hills, New York) (Note: Tracks 2, 3, 5–7 and 10–13); Tone X Recording (Washington, D.C.) (Note: Tracks 3, 4, 6 and 7); Record Plant (Los Angeles) (Note: Track 4); The Hit Factory (New York City) (Note: Track 6); Chung King (New York City) (Note: Tracks 6 and 12); AMG (New York City) (Note: Track 9); Horizon (Capitol Heights, Maryland) (Note: Tracks 10 and 12); Flyte Tyme (Edina, Minnesota) (Note: Track 13)
- Length: 57:27
- Label: London
- Producers: Cheryl "Salt" James; Sandra "Pepa" Denton; Chad "Dr. Ceuss" Elliott; Esmail; Sean "The Mystro" Mather; Josef Powell; Al West; David "D.J." Wynn

Salt-N-Pepa chronology
Very Necessary (1993)	Brand New (1997)	The Best of Salt-N-Pepa (1999)

Singles from Brand New
- 1. "R U Ready" Released: August 29, 1997; 2. "Gitty Up" Released: December 7, 1997

Brand New is the fifth studio album by American hip hop group Salt-N-Pepa, released on October 21, 1997, by London Records. The group's international label at the time, Red Ant Entertainment, filed for bankruptcy before the album was officially released; aside from a brief tour and some TV and print ads, almost no promotion was available to boost the record. Brand New spawned two singles: "R U Ready" and "Gitty Up". The album was certified gold by the Recording Industry Association of America (RIAA) on November 25, 1997, a sharp decline from the group's previous efforts.

== Production ==
Brand New was the first Salt-N-Pepa album released after the group parted ways with longtime producer, writer, and manager Hurby "Luv Bug" Azor. Instead, Salt took the lead in co-writing and co-produced the album.

== Critical reception ==
Professional ratings
Review scores
Source	Rating
AllMusic	3/5 stars
Robert Christgau	(choice cut)
The Encyclopedia of Popular Music	3/5 stars
Entertainment Weekly	B−
Music Week	4/5 stars
Rolling Stone	3/5 stars
The Source	3/5 stars

Natasha Stovall of Rolling Stone praised the "richer piano-, guitar- and vocal-filled sound, emphasizing gritty soul and sweet, unadulterated funk." Jon Pareles of The New York Times wrote that the group "still juxtapose catchy come-ons ... and determinedly positive messages." Connie Johnson of the Los Angeles Times wrote that "while it's commendable that they're stretching out in a more uplifting, spiritually motivated arena, the group's forte is still worldly, raunchy, of-the-flesh fare." In a review for The Source, Raquel Cepeda described the album as "[m]elodically heavy, but lacking in the lyrical department".

== Track listing ==
No.	Title	Writer(s)	Producer(s)	Length
1.	"R U Ready"	Cheryl James; Sandra Denton; Chad Elliott; Rufus Moore; Al West; Randy Muller	Cheryl "Salt" James; Chad "Dr. Ceuss" Elliott; West	3:58
2.	"Good Life"	C. James; Maurice Scott; Richard Evans; Bernard Grobman; Gavin Wray	C. James; Elliott^{[a]}	3:54
3.	"Do Me Right"	C. James; David Blake; Robert Bacon; George Archie; Wilbert Milow; D.J. Walker	C. James; Josef Powell	4:36
4.	"Friends" (featuring Queen Latifah and Mad Lion)	Denton; Powell; Vanesa Powers; Anthony Criss; Dana Owens	Powell; Sandra "Pepa" Denton	4:42
5.	"Say Ooh"	C. James; Larry Young; Linda Logan; Fernando Saunders	Elliott; C. James^{[b]}	4:09
6.	"Imagine" (featuring Sheryl Crow)	C. James; Powell	C. James; Powell^{[a]}	5:26
7.	"Knock Knock"	Denton; Powell; Earnest Hairston Jr.; David Wynn	Powell; Denton; David "D.J." Wynn	4:32
8.	"Gitty Up"	C. James; Moore; Rick James	Elliott; West	4:00
9.	"Boy Toy"	Denton; Elliott; Norman Whitfield; Otwane Roberts	Elliott; West; Denton^{[b]}	4:24
10.	"Brand New"	C. James; Denton; Gary Wright	C. James; Sean "The Mystro" Mather; Esmail; Powell^{[a]}	4:05
11.	"Silly of You"	C. James; Keef James	C. James	3:52
12.	"The Clock Is Tickin'"	C. James	C. James	4:51
13.	"Hold On" (featuring Kirk Franklin and Sounds of Blackness)	C. James; Powell	C. James; Powell^{[a]}	5:06

=== Notes ===
- ^{^[a]} signifies an additional producer
- ^{^[b]} signifies a co-producer

=== Samples ===
- "R U Ready" contains excerpts from "Watch Out" by Brass Construction.
- "Gitty Up" contains samples from "Give It To Me Baby" by Rick James
- "Say Ooh" contains a sample from "Turn Off the Lights" by Larry Young.
- "Brand New" contains an interpolation of "Love Is Alive" by Gary Wright.

== Personnel ==
- Prince Charles Alexander – mixing
- Eddie Anzueto Jr. – percussion
- Steven Augustine – bass
- Kent Belden – creative director
- Blue Denim – background vocals
- Mike Campbell – guitar
- Melvin Chandler – keyboards
- Lewis Christian – percussion
- Day Ta Day – background vocals
- Andre Debourg – engineer, mixing
- James Denton – photography
- Sandy "Pepa" Denton – producer
- DJ Flexx – background vocals
- Chad "Dr. Ceuss" Elliott – programming, producer, engineer, mixing
- Glenn Ellis – bass
- Esmail – producer
- Alan Forney – photo imaging
- Kirk Franklin – performer
- Wayne Garrick – keyboards
- Khari Green – guitar
- Bernard Grobman – guitar
- Andrew Hellier – guitar, background vocals
- Cheryl "Salt" James – producer
- Jon Jones – guitar
- Gerhard Joost – mixing
- Carol Kirkendall – executive producer
- LaTrece – background vocals
- Michael Lockwood – guitar
- Al (Taz) Machera – mixing
- Sean "Mystro" Mather – producer
- Gary Montoute – synthesizer
- Michael Moore – photography
- Rufus Moore – background vocals, performer
- Joseph Powell – programming, background vocals, producer, engineer, mixing
- Wayne Rickard – guitar
- Alicia Rushing – background vocals
- Ken Schubert – engineer, mixing
- Dawne Shivers – background vocals
- Peggy Sirota – photography
- Sounds of Blackness – performer
- Spinderella – performer
- Kevin Thomas – engineer
- Al West – producer
- Jimmy White – bass
- David Wynn – producer
- George Belton - bass

== Charts ==
Chart performance for Brand New
Chart (1997)	Peak position
Australian Albums (ARIA)	186
German Albums (Offizielle Top 100)	64
Swiss Albums (Schweizer Hitparade)	23
US Billboard 200	37
US Top R&B/Hip-Hop Albums (Billboard)	16

== Certifications ==
Certifications for Brand New
Region	Certification	Certified units/sales
United States (RIAA)	Gold	500,000^{^}
^{^} Shipments figures based on certification alone.
