= Shake Your Thang =

Single by Salt-N-Pepa featuring E.U.

from the album A Salt with a Deadly Pepa
- B-side: "Spinderella's Not a Fella (But a Girl DJ)"
- Released: August 1, 1988
- Recorded: Bayside Sound
- Genre: Hip hop; R&B; go-go
- Length: 3:59
- Label: Next Plateau Entertainment; London
- Songwriters: O'Kelly Isley; Ronald Isley; Rudolph Isley
- Producer: Hurby Luv Bug

Salt-N-Pepa singles chronology
"Chick on the Side" (1987)	"Shake Your Thang" (1988)	"Get Up Everybody (Get Up)" (1988)

"Shake Your Thang" is a song by American R&B and hip hop group Salt-N-Pepa, released by Next Plateau Entertainment and London Records as the first single from their second studio album, A Salt with a Deadly Pepa (1988). The song features the Washington, D.C.–based go-go musical band, E.U. It samples "It's Your Thing" by The Isley Brothers and "Funky President" by James Brown.

The music video features Salt-N-Pepa being arrested for "dirty dancing". At the police station they are questioned by cops played by Hurby Luv Bug and Kid 'n Play. There are scenes of them dancing in an all white room with a crowd and back up dancers, additionally they dance outside on stairs and on the streets. At the end of the video they are released from the police station, this leads into the music video for their next single, "Get Up Everybody (Get Up)".

In an interview, Salt explained she considers herself a feminist "in a way", emphasizing the need for women to avoid complete emotional and financial dependence on men. Songs like "Tramp" and "Shake Your Thang" express these feminist themes of female autonomy.

== Critical reception ==
Ben Thompson from NME wrote, "As usual bits of this were purloined from various sources (Isley Bros etc) but who cares when it's such a belting tune. That all-but-forgotten go-go swing, courtesy of EV [sic], some crappy '70s disco trumpets, an argumentative piano and a fine plucky bass add up to a night of fun for all concerned. The package comes complete with a stern reminder to would-be disco casanovas, "We just met, we can't do that yet." You can't help wanting to enjoy yourself when you hear this, however hard you try, because it is irresistably [sic] wholesome. Shake Your Thang indeed."

== Track listing ==
- 7" single
1. "Shake Your Thang" – 3:59
2. "Spinderella's Not a Fella (But a Girl D.J.)" – 4:27
- 12" vinyl / CD single

A1. "Shake Your Thang" (club mix) – 5:16
A2. "Shake Your Thang" (radio version) – 3:59
A3. "Shake Your Thang" (instrumental) – 4:02
A4. "Shake Your Thang" (acappella) – 0:28
B1. "Spinderella's Not a Fella (But a Girl DJ)" (Vocal) – 4:24
B2. "Spinderella's Not a Fella (But a Girl DJ)" (Instrumental) – 4:17
B3. "Spinderella's Not a Fella (But a Girl DJ)" (Acappella) – 0:36

== Charts ==
Chart performance for "Shake Your Thang"
Chart (1988)	Peak position
Australia (ARIA)	47
Belgium (Ultratop 50 Wallonia)	9
Ireland (IRMA)	29
Netherlands (Dutch Top 40)	8
Netherlands (Single Top 100)	9
UK Singles (Official Charts)	22
US Dance Club Songs (Billboard)	8
US Hot R&B/Hip-Hop Songs (Billboard)	14
West Germany (GfK)	29
