= A Salt with a Deadly Pepa =

Studio album by Salt-N-Pepa
- Released: July 26, 1988
- Recorded: 1987–1988
- Studio: Bayside Sound (New York City)
- Genre: Hip hop
- Length: 43:01
- Labels: London; Next Plateau
- Producers: Hurby Luv Bug; The Invincibles

Salt-N-Pepa chronology
Hot, Cool & Vicious (1986)	A Salt with a Deadly Pepa (1988)	Blacks' Magic (1990)

Singles from A Salt with a Deadly Pepa
- 1. "Shake Your Thang" Released: August 1, 1988

Professional ratings
Review scores
Source	Rating
AllMusic	2.5/5 stars
Robert Christgau	B
The Encyclopedia of Popular Music	3/5 stars
The Rolling Stone Album Guide	3.5/5 stars
Spin Alternative Record Guide	4/10

A Salt with a Deadly Pepa is the second studio album by American hip hop group Salt-N-Pepa, released on July 26, 1988, by London Records and Next Plateau Records. The album reached number 38 on the Billboard 200 and number eight on the Top R&B/Hip-Hop Albums chart. On December 1, 1988, it was certified gold by the Recording Industry Association of America (RIAA). The album spawned three singles, the top-10 R&B entry "Shake Your Thang"; the top-20 R&B entry "Get Up Everybody (Get Up)"; and "Twist and Shout", which peaked at number four on the UK Singles Chart. The album's title is a play on "assault with a deadly weapon".

== Track listing ==
All tracks are written by Fingerprints, except where noted.

No.	Title	Writer(s)	Length
1.	"Intro Jam"		0:40
2.	"A Salt with a Deadly Pepa"		3:29
3.	"I Like It Like That"		4:06
4.	"Solo Power (Let's Get Paid)"		3:30
5.	"Shake Your Thang" (featuring E.U.)	O'Kelly Isley Jr.; Ronald Isley; Rudolph Isley	3:58
6.	"I Gotcha"	Joe Tex	4:09
7.	"Let the Rhythm Run (Remix)"		3:25
8.	"Get Up Everybody (Get Up)"		3:37
9.	"Spinderella's Not a Fella (But a Girl D.J.)"		4:00
10.	"Solo Power (Syncopated Soul)"		3:44
11.	"Twist and Shout"	Bert Russell; Phil Medley	4:54
12.	"Hyped on the Mic"		3:29

== Personnel ==
Credits adapted from the liner notes of A Salt with a Deadly Pepa.

=== Technical ===
- Hurby Luv Bug – production
- The Invincibles – production
- Andre DeBourg – recording
- Herb Powers Jr. – mastering

=== Artwork ===
- Janette Beckman – photography
- Jeff Faville – cover design and concept
- Russ Parr – album title

== Charts ==
=== Weekly charts ===
Weekly chart performance for A Salt with a Deadly Pepa
Chart (1988)	Peak position
Australian Albums (ARIA)	126
Dutch Albums (Album Top 100)	21
European Albums (Music & Media)	46
German Albums (Offizielle Top 100)	40
Swiss Albums (Schweizer Hitparade)	16
UK Albums (Official Charts)	19
US Billboard 200	38
US Top R&B/Hip-Hop Albums (Billboard)	8

=== Year-end charts ===
Year-end chart performance for A Salt with a Deadly Pepa
Chart (1988)	Position
UK Albums (Gallup)	70
US Top R&B/Hip-Hop Albums (Billboard)	58

== Certifications ==
Certifications for A Salt with a Deadly Pepa
Region	Certification	Certified units/sales
United Kingdom (BPI)	Gold	100,000^{^}
United States (RIAA)	Gold	500,000^{^}
^{^} Shipments figures based on certification alone.
