= Hot, Cool & Vicious =

Studio album by Salt-N-Pepa
- Released: December 8, 1986
- Recorded: October 1985 – August 1986
- Studio: Greene St. Recording (New York City)
- Genre: Hip hop
- Length: 41:36
- Label: Next Plateau
- Producers: Hurby Luv Bug; Stephen Keitt

Salt-N-Pepa chronology
Hot, Cool & Vicious (1986)	A Salt with a Deadly Pepa (1988)

Singles from Hot, Cool & Vicious
- 1. "Push It" Released: March 8, 1987

Hot, Cool, & Vicious is the debut studio album by American hip hop trio Salt-N-Pepa. Released by Next Plateau Records on December 8, 1986, it became the first release by a female rap act to be certified gold, then platinum, in the US.

Hot, Cool, & Vicious reached the top 40 on the US Billboard 200 chart. The album included the single "Push It", which reached the top 20 on the US Billboard Hot 100 chart and number two on the UK Singles Chart after being propelled by a remix, and was nominated for Best Rap Performance at the 31st Annual Grammy Awards. The album has sold approximately four million copies worldwide, becoming the first release by a female rap act to attain gold and platinum certification by the Recording Industry Association of America (RIAA).

== Release ==
The album features the songs "The Showstopper" and "I'll Take Your Man", recorded and released prior to the full album's release. It also includes R&B radio favorites "Tramp" and "My Mic Sound Nice". In 1987, the addition of the single "Push It" (US #19, UK #2), along with the replacement of two other tracks with remixed versions, propelled the album to gold, then platinum status in the United States, and made it the first album by a female rap act (or group) to attain gold and platinum certifications from the Recording Industry Association of America. "Push It" was also certified platinum.

== Reception ==
Professional ratings
Review scores
Source	Rating
AllMusic	3.0/5 stars
Robert Christgau	A−

NME placed Hot, Cool & Vicious at number 18 on its list of the best releases of 1987. The album was certified platinum in the US, making the trio the first female hip-hop act to have a gold- or platinum-certified album.

== Track listing ==
No.	Title	Writer(s)	Length
1.	"Push It (Remix)"	Hurby Azor	4:31
2.	"Beauty and the Beat"	Azor	4:39
3.	"Tramp"	Azor; Lowell Fulson; Jimmy McCracklin	3:30
4.	"I'll Take Your Man"	Azor; George Clinton; Bootsy Collins; Bernie Worrell	6:22
5.	"It's Alright"	Azor	3:15
6.	"Chick on the Side (Remix)"	Azor; Anita Pointer; Bonnie Pointer; June Pointer; Ruth Pointer; David Rubinson	4:54
7.	"I Desire"	Azor; Nathaniel Wilson	3:16
8.	"The Showstopper"	Azor	6:22
9.	"My Mic Sounds Nice"	Azor	4:52

=== Notes ===
- “Push It (Remix)” was not part of the original track listing of the 1986 release of Hot, Cool & Vicious, which also included the original unedited and unremixed versions of "Tramp" and "Chick on the Side". The original version of "Push It" was recorded in 1987 and added to later pressings of the album. The original pressing of the album was never released on compact disc.
- “The Showstopper”, an answer record of Doug E. Fresh & Slick Rick’s “The Show,” was originally released in 1985 by Pop Art Records under the artist name Super Nature—Salt-n-Pepa’s original name—as a community-college project.

== Charts ==
=== Weekly charts ===
Weekly chart performance for Hot, Cool & Vicious
Chart (1988)	Peak position
Australian Albums (ARIA)	83
Canada Top Albums/CDs (RPM)	27
German Albums (Offizielle Top 100)	63
New Zealand Albums (RMNZ)	41
US Billboard 200	26
US Top R&B/Hip-Hop Albums (Billboard)	7

=== Year-end charts ===
1987 weekly chart performance for Hot, Cool & Vicious
Chart (1987)	Position
US Top R&B/Hip-Hop Albums (Billboard)	30

1988 weekly chart performance for Hot, Cool & Vicious
Chart (1988)	Position
US Billboard 200	57
US Top R&B/Hip-Hop Albums (Billboard)	18

== Certifications ==
Certifications for Hot, Cool & Vicious
Region	Certification	Certified units/sales
Canada (Music Canada)	Gold	50,000^{^}
United States (RIAA)	Platinum	1,000,000^{^}
^{^} Shipments figures based on certification alone.
