= Whatta Man =

Single by Salt-N-Pepa with En Vogue

from the album Very Necessary and Runaway Love
- A-side: "Shoop" (US)
- B-side: "Push It" (remix); "Let's Talk About Sex"
- Released: December 2, 1993
- Recorded: August 1993
- Genre: R&B; hip hop
- Length: 4:42
- Label: Next Plateau; London
- Songwriters: Cheryl James; Dave Crawford; Hurby Azor
- Producer: Hurby Azor

Salt-N-Pepa singles chronology
"Shoop" (1993)	"Whatta Man" (1993)	"None of Your Business" (1994)

En Vogue singles chronology
"What Is Love" (1993)	"Whatta Man" (1993)	"Don't Let Go (Love)" (1996)

"Whatta Man" is a song by American hip-hop group Salt-N-Pepa featuring American girl group En Vogue. It peaked at number three on the US Billboard Hot 100 and peaked within the top ten in Australia, Canada, New Zealand, and the United Kingdom. It also sampled Linda Lyndell's then-obscure song "What a Man". Its music video won four awards, including three at the 1994 MTV Video Music Awards.

== Production ==
In 1993, American hip-hop trio Salt-N-Pepa recorded "Whatta Man" for Runaway Love, an EP by En Vogue, who is credited as the featured group. Freddy Foxx wrote the rap lyrics and produced the song, with Cheryl James (Salt) also credited as one of the songwriters. Salt-N-Pepa sampled Linda Lyndell's 1968 song "What a Man" and remade the song as a rap song.

En Vogue sings the refrain of the song—"Whatta man, whatta man, whatta mighty good man"—while a pregnant Cindy Herron is featured only on background vocals. Lead vocals are performed by Dawn Robinson, and Maxine Jones on ad-libs during the later part of the song. "Whatta Man" was later included on Salt-N-Pepa's 1993 album, Very Necessary. The male vocals at the beginning of the song were performed by brothers Troy and John Mitchell of the rap group 3 Feet. The music video for the song was directed by Matthew Rolston.

== Critical reception ==
AllMusic editor Stephen Thomas Erlewine called the song "such a wonderful duet", noting that they deliver a song "so sexy it hurts". Larry Flick from Billboard magazine wrote that the "fierce, ruling rap divas dip into their fine Very Necessary album and pull out this wickedly funky hip hop jam." He added further, "Loose and oh-so-appealing harmonies by En Vogue provide a kickin' framework for clever, lip-lickin' rhymes that melt into the track's butt-shaggin' beats. Destined to be an out-of-the-box smasheroo, single further benefits from Danny D's well-conceived remixes." James Earl Hardy from Entertainment Weekly felt in his review of En Vogue's EP, Runaway Love, that the song "prove [that] these divas have more in common with the Emotions and the Sweet Inspirations than with the Supremes." Dave Sholin from the Gavin Report commented, "Whatta concept, pairing these goddesses of hip-hop with a killer track and some of the best lines heard in a long time. Though it was getting a healthy number of spins in several markets late last year, it's now starting to bust big."

James Hamilton from Music Week's RM Dance Update deemed it a "cooing gritty slow rap" in his weekly dance column. Ted Kessler from NME named it Unstoppable Hit Single of the Week, writing, "This takes En Vogue's "My Lovin'", puts it in a car, drives it off somewhere hot, sunny and sexy, slows it down, feeds it loads of funky guitar and sewns in some sassy rapping about how the ideal man treats Salt, Pepa and Spinderella." Gerald Martinez from New Sunday Times felt the song showed that En Vogue "can rap with the best of them." People Magazine described it as "R&B-stoked". Sylvia Patterson from Smash Hits gave it two out of five. James Hunter from Vibe noted that En Vogue are "sounding proud as punch to play second fiddle, furnish Salt-N-Pepa with harmonic backdrops. It's a logical collaboration: En Vogue provide the sound of true romance that the rappers can better state than demonstrate."

== Commercial performance ==
"Whatta Man" was a major hit for Salt-N-Pepa and En Vogue, peaking at number three on the US Billboard Hot 100, number seven on the UK Singles Chart and number six on the UK Dance Singles Chart. In the US, this version was certified platinum. The song was nominated for the Grammy Award for Best R&B Performance by a Duo or Group with Vocals and the American Music Award for Favorite Soul/R&B Single. "Whatta Man" was ranked number 23 on VH1's countdown of the 100 Greatest Songs of the 1990s.

== Lyrics analyses ==
Richard Harrington of The Washington Post interprets the song as "a celebration of strong men who stay home and care for kids." Garth Baker-Fletcher, an Associate Professor of Religion from Texas College, interpreted the version's refrain as "praising a steady-thinking, family-values-yet-sexy man." Writer Keith Boykin described the song portion, "Although most men are hos / He flows on the down low / Cuz I never heard about him with another girl," as if "rather than praise his faithfulness, the artists appreciate his discretion, while tacitly acknowledging his cheating." Moreover, Boykin said that "another girl" refers to Salt-N-Pepa's considerations of "heterosexual infidelity" and as if "some women [...] were publicly excusing their men for their down low behavior."

== Music videos ==
=== Standard version ===
A music video was released to promote the single—it was added to MTV's playlist on the week ending January 2, 1994. Tupac Shakur and Treach from Naughty by Nature make cameo appearances. The video was directed by Matthew Rolston and filmed by cinematographer Derek M. Allen. New York magazine journalist Dinitia Smith wrote about the video: "Salt-N-Pepa have [sic] a warmth and sexual heat that make Madonna seem contrived and mechanical."

=== Monday Night Football version ===
Salt-N-Pepa later recorded a variation on their own, with slightly rewritten lyrics, for another music video as the one-time segment of Monday Night Football. In the Monday music video, the two women wearing tight short-sleeved clothes, including T-shirts containing their respective logos of two opposing teams, are seen in a gym complimenting two football players of their respective teams, one white and one black, for the men's bodies and weight training efforts. In contrast, the lyrics of the Monday Night Football music video say that "their man 'likes pushin'[,] spends quality ball with the fellas,' and 'takes a big hit, 'cause he's a real man.' "

According to academic Nick Trujillo of California State University, Sacramento, the rap song may associate hypermasculinity "with combat sports such as [American] football." He further said that the standard version has the women rather choose men who do not play football but are good parental candidates and are comfortable with their masculinities, while the Monday music video "not only objectifie[s] football players as sex objects but also reinforce[s] stereotypes of black men as sexual performers and white men as loving fathers."

== Impact and legacy ==
NME magazine ranked "Whatta Man" number 34 in their list of the "50 best songs of 1994". The music video won an award in the category for Urban/R&B at the 1994 Music Video Production Awards in Los Angeles. The Village Voice ranked it number 99 in their list of "Top Singles of the 90's" in 1999. Q magazine featured the song in their list of "The 1010 Songs You Must Own" in 2004.

== Awards and nominations ==
Year	Award	Nomination work	Result
1994	MTV Video Music Awards	Best Dance Video, Best R&B Video, and Best Choreography	Won
1994	Music Video Production Award	Best Urban/R&B Video	Won
1995	American Music Award	Favorite Soul/R&B Single	Nominated
1995	Grammy Award	Best R&B Vocal Performance by a Duo or Group	Nominated

== Track listing ==
US maxi-CD single

1. "Whatta Man" (video remix)
2. "Whatta Man" (Luvbug remix)
3. "Whatta Man" (12-inch Danny D remix)
4. "Push It" (remix)
5. "Let's Talk About AIDS"

== Charts ==
=== Weekly charts ===
Chart (1993–1994)	Peak position
Australia (ARIA)	2
Austria (Ö3 Austria Top 40)	27
Belgium (Ultratop 50 Flanders)	34
Canada Retail Singles (The Record)	3
Canada Top Singles (RPM)	13
Canada Dance/Urban (RPM)	4
Denmark (IFPI)	19
Europe (Eurochart Hot 100)	18
Europe (European Dance Radio)	7
Europe (European Hit Radio)	16
France (SNEP)	28
Germany (GfK)	39
Iceland (Íslenski Listinn Topp 40)	40
Ireland (IRMA)	12
Israel (Israeli Singles Chart)	26
Netherlands (Dutch Top 40)	14
Netherlands (Single Top 100)	15
New Zealand (Recorded Music NZ)	10
Scottish Singles Sales (Official Charts)	11
Sweden (Sverigetopplistan)	37
UK Singles (Official Charts)	7
UK Airplay (Music Week)	12
UK Dance (Music Week)	6
UK Club Chart (Music Week)	60
US Billboard Hot 100	3
US Dance Singles Sales (Billboard)	5
US Hot R&B/Hip-Hop Songs (Billboard)	3
US Hot Rap Songs (Billboard)	1
US Pop Airplay (Billboard)	10
US Rhythmic Airplay (Billboard)	1
US Cash Box Top 100	5

=== Year-end charts ===
Chart (1994)	Position
Australia (ARIA)	24
Brazil (Mais Tocadas)	46
Canada Dance/Urban (RPM)	40
Netherlands (Dutch Top 40)	110
New Zealand (RIANZ)	38
UK Singles (OCC)	72
US Billboard Hot 100	14
US Hot R&B Singles (Billboard)	36
US Hot Rap Singles (Billboard)	12
US Maxi-Singles Sales (Billboard)	45
US Cash Box Top 100	28

== Certifications ==
Region	Certification	Certified units/sales
Australia (ARIA)	Platinum	70,000^{^}
New Zealand (RMNZ)	Platinum	30,000^{‡}
United Kingdom (BPI)	Silver	200,000^{‡}
United States (RIAA)	Platinum	1,000,000^{^}
^{^} Shipments figures based on certification alone.^{‡} Sales+streaming figures based on certification alone.

== Release history ==
Region	Date	Format(s)	Label(s)	Ref.
United States	December 2, 1993	12-inch vinyl; CD; cassette	Next Plateau; London	
Australia	February 21, 1994	CD; cassette	Next Plateau; London; Polydor	
United Kingdom	March 7, 1994	7-inch vinyl; 12-inch vinyl; CD; cassette	Next Plateau; FFRR	
Japan	March 25, 1994	Mini-CD	London; FFRR	

== Other cover versions and uses ==
The television show Bill Nye the Science Guy features "Whatta Brain", a parody of this song by En Vogue parody band En Lobe, in the episode "Brain". Australian rock band New Waver covered the song in 1994 and released their cover as a cassingle. Funny or Die released a version of this song with Bruno Mars singing and acting out various scenes.

The Disney rap album Mickey Unrapped features "Whatta Mouse", a parody of the song about Mickey Mouse. The song was also distributed at McDonald's locations in the UK in 1999 as part of an enhanced CD EP.
