= Salt-N-Pepa =

American girl group

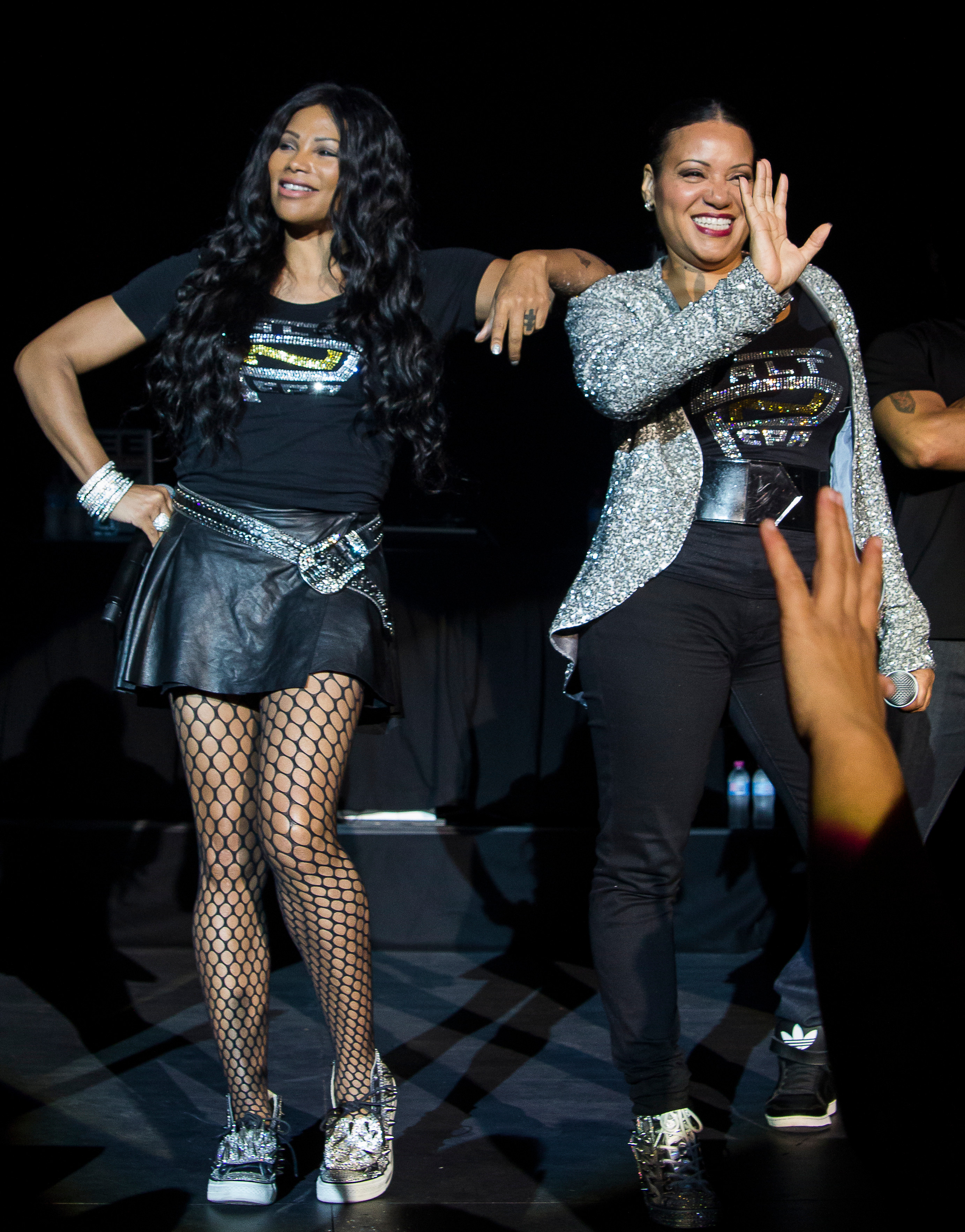
- Salt-N-Pepa performing at the Canberra Theatre in Australia

Background information
- Origin: New York City, U.S.
- Genres: Hip-hop; pop rap; pop
- Years active: 1985–2002; 2005–present
- Labels: Pop Art; Next Plateau; London; Red Ant; FFRR
- Members: Salt; Pepa; Spinderella
- Past members: Latoya Hanson
- Website: saltnpepa.com

Salt-N-Pepa (sometimes stylized as Salt 'N' Pepa) is an American hip-hop group formed in New York City in 1985, that is composed of Salt (Cheryl James), Pepa (Sandra Denton), and DJ Spinderella (Deidra Roper). Their debut album, Hot, Cool & Vicious (1986), sold more than 1 million copies in the US, making them the first female rap act to receive both a gold and platinum certification by the Recording Industry Association of America (RIAA). Its lead single, "Push It", which was released in 1987 as the B-side to their single "Tramp", peaked within the top 20 of the Billboard Hot 100.

Salt-N-Pepa's second album, A Salt with a Deadly Pepa (1988), was certified gold by the RIAA. The trio's third album, Blacks' Magic (1990), featured the singles "Expression" and "Let's Talk About Sex". Their fourth album, Very Necessary (1993), sold more than 5 million copies domestically (7 million worldwide), and remained the highest-selling rap album by a female act (solo or group) until 1998. The album included the hit singles "Shoop" and "Whatta Man" with En Vogue. They won the 1995 Grammy Award for Best Rap Performance by a Duo or Group for their song "None of Your Business", making them one of the first female rap acts to win a Grammy Award, along with Queen Latifah, who won later during the same ceremony. In 2021, they won a Grammy Lifetime Achievement Award. Salt-N-Pepa were inducted into the Rock and Roll Hall of Fame in 2025 for Musical Influence.

Salt-N-Pepa have sold more than 15 million records worldwide, making them one of the best selling rap acts of all time. Their success in rap and hip-hop culture has earned them the honorific title "The First Ladies of Rap".

== History ==
=== 1985–1987: Formation and Hot, Cool & Vicious ===
Sandra Denton worked as a telephone solicitor at a Sears in College Point. She met Cheryl James in the Sears lunchroom. They both were also enrolled as nursing students at Queensborough Community College. The pair became close friends, and also co–workers at Sears, along with future celebrities Kid N' Play and Martin Lawrence. Another co-worker Hurby "Luv Bug" Azor was studying music production at the Center of Media Arts and had his then-girlfriend Cheryl James, and also Sandra Denton, record a song for him as a class project he had to do. This resulted in the song "The Showstopper", an answer record to Doug E. Fresh's hit single "The Show" by the duo, who originally called themselves Super Nature. The song used a melody from the 1984 film Revenge of the Nerds. Azor passed the song along to his friend Marley Marl who hosted a weekend rap show on a New York City radio station. Marl occasionally included the song in his set rotation, and it became so popular that the station received requests to play it during Marl's weekend rap set. The song, however, was not available in stores as it was simply a music school assignment. The independent Pop Art Records stepped in and offered to give the song an official release, and "The Show Stoppa (Is Stupid Fresh)" [sic] became a modest R&B hit, reaching No. 46 on the US Billboard R&B chart.

After finding some success with "The Show Stoppa (Is Stupid Fresh)" [sic], Azor, James, and Denton decided to focus on the group full-time, with Denton and James soon dropping out of nursing school. Azor changed the group's name to Salt-N-Pepa, based on the song's lyrics "Right now I'm gonna show you how it's supposed to be 'Cause we, the salt and pepper MCs", which had resulted in radio stations getting phone calls requesting "The Showstopper" by Salt And Pepper. In September 1985, the group signed to Next Plateau Records, but the label only wanted to release a single at first; James and Denton recorded "I'll Take Your Man", produced by Azor, and the label released it. The song utilized a melody from the hit single "Flash Light" by funk band Parliament. Next Plateau had now requested a full-length album, and Azor felt the group should be a female trio, similar to the male rap trio Run DMC. Before starting work on a full-length album, Azor recruited DJ Latoya Hanson (called Spinderella) into Salt-N-Pepa. The ladies worked on the album and in December 1986 the trio's debut album Hot, Cool & Vicious was released, produced by Azor, Salt's boyfriend at the time and the group's manager. Hanson was in the group for a few months but she and Salt were not on friendly terms and Hanson departed the group after they finished the album, but just before it was distributed to stores. Soon after, in early 1987, 16-year-old high school student Deidra Roper was recruited into the group by Azor and became known as Spinderella, the DJ in the group.

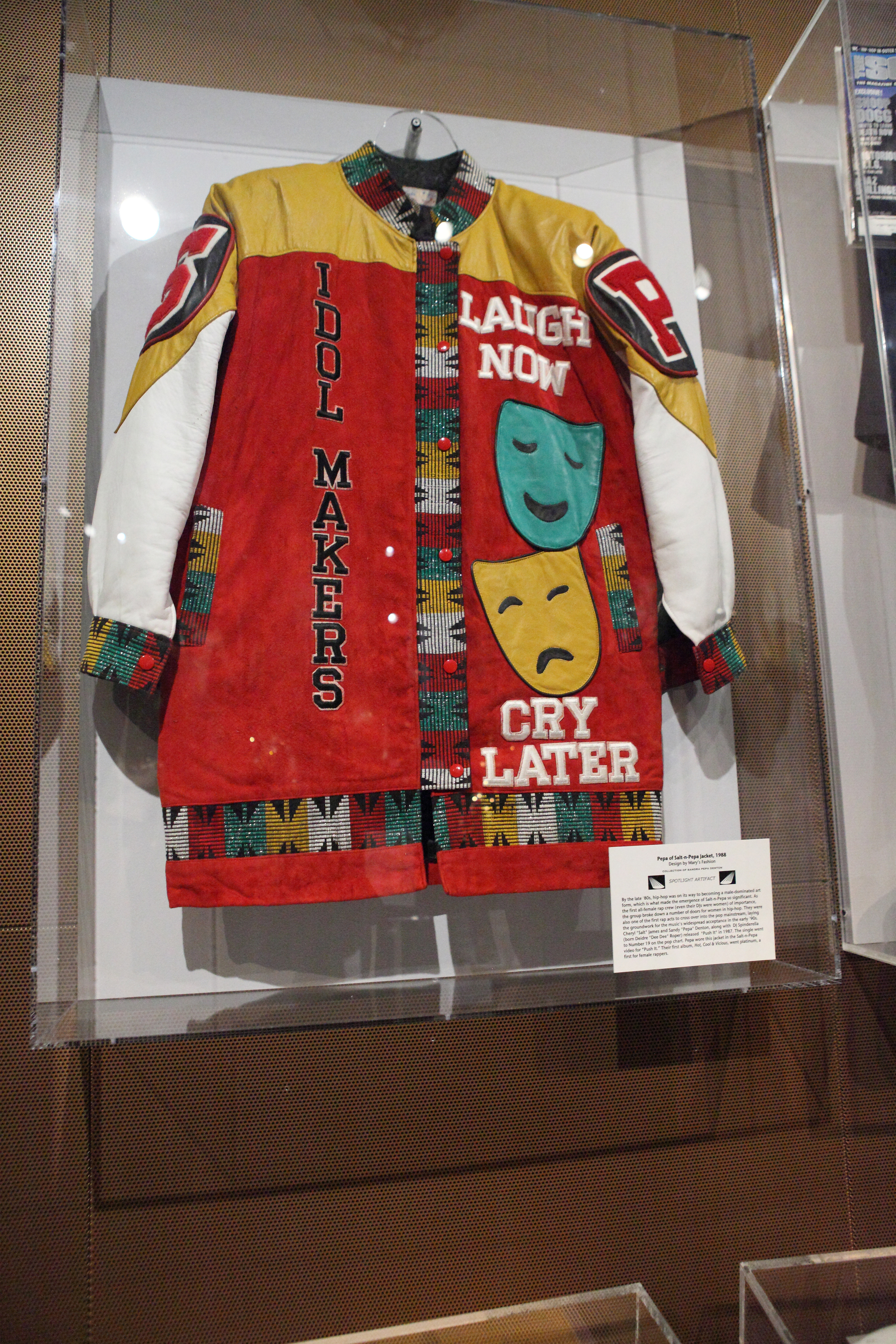
1980s era Salt-N-Pepa jacket on display at the Rock and Roll Hall of Fame

Hot, Cool & Vicious included some moderate rap/R&B radio hits such as "The Showstopper", "My Mic Sound Nice", and "Tramp", but when San Francisco DJ and producer Cameron Paul created a remix to "Push It", the B-side of the "Tramp" single, it gave the group their first major hit. "Push It" (US No. 19, UK No. 2) became a platinum single in the United States, and a hit in several other countries, and was added to subsequent pressings of Hot, Cool & Vicious. It was nominated for a Grammy Award, and the strength of that single catapulted the album to platinum sales in the U.S. with over 1 million copies sold, making Denton, James, and Roper the first female rap act to go platinum. The album ultimately sold 1.4 million copies worldwide.

The group entered the music industry at a time when hip-hop was believed to be a fad, and as major record companies were very reluctant to sign hip-hop artists, many early hip-hop artists recorded for independent labels. Salt-N-Pepa greatly impacted hip-hop by being one of the first all-female rap groups. Concerned about sexist lyrics and video clips that objectified women's bodies in hip-hop, many feminists disliked rap and hip-hop because it negatively portrayed women. However, Salt-N-Pepa changed the look of hip-hop. They were scantily clad in sexy clothing and were not afraid to talk about sex and their thoughts about men. Their song "Let's Talk About Sex" was a huge hit.

=== 1988–1992: A Salt with a Deadly Pepa and Blacks' Magic ===
Salt-N-Pepa's next album, A Salt with a Deadly Pepa, was released on July 26, 1988, and contained the top 10 R&B hit "Shake Your Thang", featuring the go-go band E.U. Also, a top 20 R&B hit and a minor pop hit were seen in "Get Up Everybody (Get Up)" and "Twist and Shout", respectively; with "Twist and Shout" becoming a major hit in the UK (No. 4), and several European countries. The album sold 800,000 copies globally, with 500,000 of those sold in the US, obtaining gold-status in the US.

The group's third album Blacks' Magic was released on March 19, 1990 and saw personal moments for the trio on different levels. Pepa had become the first group member to become pregnant. Azor produced some songs on the album, but as he was producing other acts, he agreed to let the group work with different producers to finish the album. Salt and Spinderella took on some producing assignments themselves, and the trio hired different producers, such as Invincible's producer Dana Mozie. This was the first album to feature Roper on vocals throughout much of the album as well as DJing. The result was six singles released by Next Plateau Records, several of which became hits: "Expression" (US No. 26, UK No. 40 in 1990, UK No. 23 in 1992), a platinum single, produced by Salt; "Independent"; "I Don't Know" (featuring Kid 'n Play); "Do You Want Me" (US No. 21, UK No. 5), certified gold; "Let's Talk About Sex" (US No. 13, UK No. 2), certified gold, and later re-recorded as "Let's Talk About AIDS" for an awareness promotion; and "You Showed Me" (US No. 47, UK No. 15). The album ultimately sold 1.6 million copies worldwide with one million of those sold in the U.S. A greatest hits album called A Blitz of Salt-N-Pepa Hits, featuring some remixed versions of songs from the group's first three albums later was released.

In 1992, they appeared in the film Stay Tuned, performing the song "Start Me Up".

=== 1993–1996: Groundbreaking success, Very Necessary ===
Salt-N-Pepa's fourth studio album Very Necessary was released on October 12, 1993, on London Records. The album featured songwriting and production by Salt, Pepa, Spinderella, and Azor. Buoyed by the hits "Shoop" (U.S. No. 4, UK No. 13), co-produced by Pepa; "Whatta Man" (U.S. No. 3, UK No. 7) (featuring En Vogue); and "None of Your Business", a top 40 U.S. hit and a top 20 UK hit, Very Necessary eventually sold seven million copies worldwide, with 5 million of those in the U.S. - 5× platinum status. This made them the first female rap act (solo or group) to have a multi-platinum certified album. In 1994, they co-headlined The Very Necessary 12 Play Tour with R. Kelly. The trio won a Grammy Award for Best Rap Performance by a Duo or Group in 1995 for the single "None of Your Business", making them the first female rap act to win a Grammy, along with Queen Latifah who later won at the same ceremony. Very Necessary is the best-selling album by a female rap act. During this period, they also appeared in films. Salt co-starred in the movie Who's the Man? (1993) and Pepa co-starred in the film Joe's Apartment (1996). Pepa became romantically involved with Treach of the rap group Naughty By Nature.

=== 1997–2004: Brand New and hiatus ===
By the time of their next album release, Salt-N-Pepa had gone through the legal process of completely breaking away from Azor, whom they accused of unfair royalty payments. Salt had already stopped being romantically involved with him due to their many ups-and-downs. The trio left London Records after one album and signed with Red Ant Records, though still distributed by PolyGram Records (the label that had distributed their Very Necessary album on London Records) through PolyGram's Island Records label. Red Ant paid the trio a $15 million signing bonus when they signed their contracts. The group undertook production duties once again, but this time Azor was not involved in any part of the album. This would be the first and only album without any production from Azor. The result was the album Brand New, released on October 21, 1997. However, Red Ant was having financial difficulties and filed for bankruptcy soon after the album hit stores, halting marketing and promotion on all its releases, including Salt-N-Pepa's album. The group toured in support of the album, but without any promotion from the bankrupt label, they only scored minor hits with "R U Ready" and "Gitty Up". The album was certified gold in the US for sales of 500,000 copies and sold approximately another 100,000 copies internationally. Although not as big a seller as its predecessor, it kept intact an unbroken string of gold or platinum studio albums by the trio.

In March 1999, Salt-N-Pepa embarked on a tour. Pepa married Treach of Naughty by Nature on July 27 of the same year. Salt-N-Pepa's greatest-hits album, titled The Best of Salt-N-Pepa, was released in Europe on January 25, 2000. Pepa and Treach remained married for two years, but their tumultuous marriage ended in divorce on July 31, 2001. With no albums contractually due at the time, Salt decided to quit the group, stating she had enough of the music industry and no longer wanted to be involved in it. They officially disbanded in 2002. Some time later, Salt announced that she would release a solo album, but ultimately did not do so. She was featured on the remix version of the Salt City Six's "Shine" on the album Holy South Worldwide, a compilation of Christian rap and Christian R&P (Rhythm & Praise) songs. The album was produced by ex-Three 6 Mafia member-turned-Christian rapper Mr. Del. Salt also revealed in later interviews that she had suffered from bulimia many years ago. Pepa appeared on the fifth season of VH-1's The Surreal Life. Spinderella became a radio personality on KKBT 100.3 in Los Angeles. She hosted The Backspin (with DJ Mo'Dav), a nationally syndicated weekly radio show featuring old-school hip-hop. She also periodically DJs at various clubs. The trio was disbanded for a total of five years.

=== 2005–2022: Reunion, other ventures and DJ Spinderella's departure ===
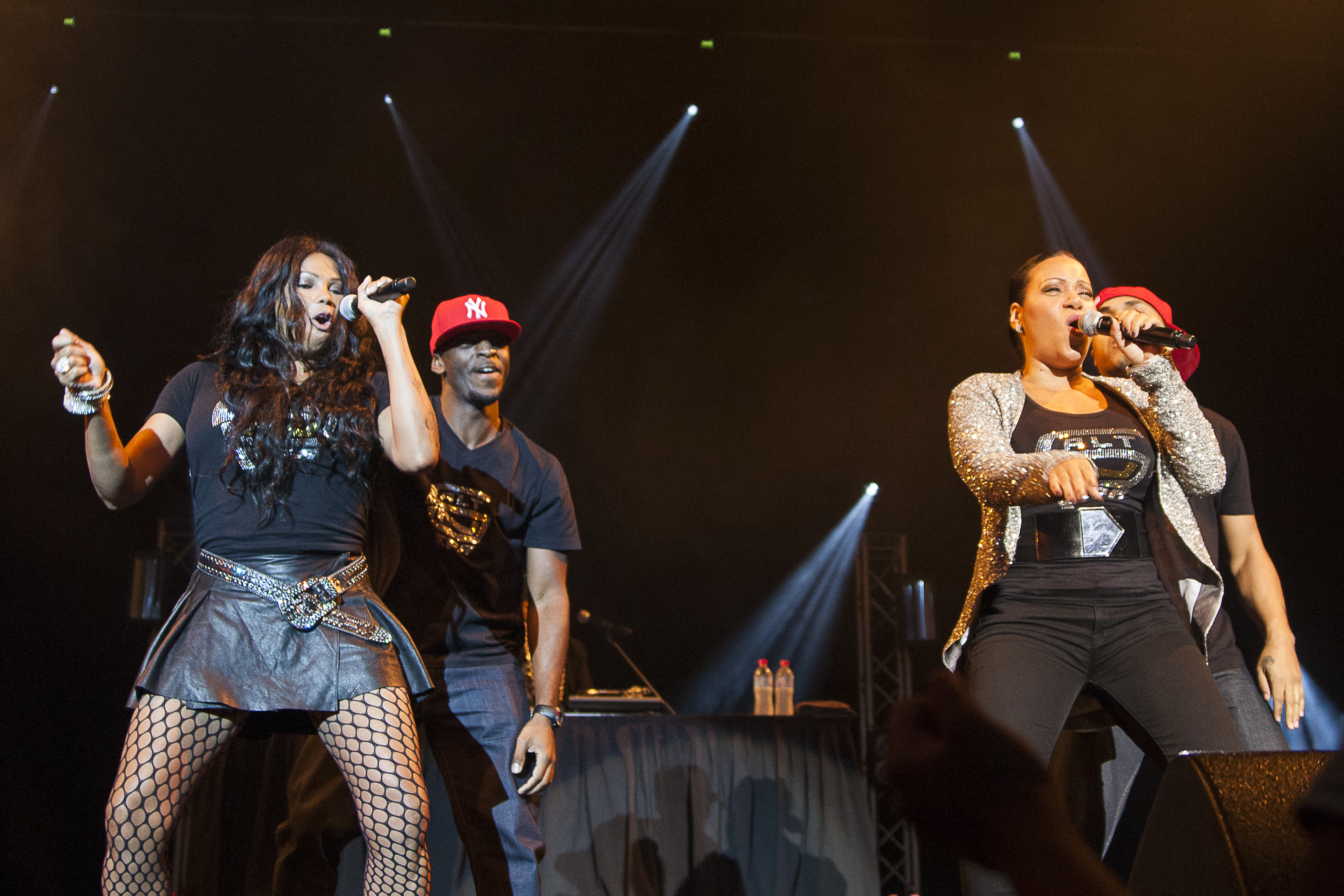
Salt-N-Pepa performing at the Canberra Theatre in 2013

Salt and Pepa both appeared on VH1's Hip Hop Honors in September 2005. All three women reunited the following year for the next Hip Hop Honors program and performed "Whatta Man" with En Vogue. It was the trio's first performance in six years, and was their first performance of "Whatta Man" with En Vogue on stage. Salt-N-Pepa reformed in 2007. All three women now have children. Spinderella has a daughter, with former NBA player Kenny Anderson, who has appeared on MTV's My Super Sweet Sixteen in 2008. Pepa has a son and a daughter, her daughter being fathered by rapper Treach. Salt has a daughter and a son.

On October 14, 2007, The Salt-N-Pepa Show debuted on VH1. Pepa had previously appeared on a different show on the network called The Surreal Life. The Salt-N-Pepa Show chronicled events in the lives of Pepa and Salt as they work out past issues. Spinderella has been featured in several episodes. Later in 2008, the trio performed at the BET Hip Hop Awards. That August, Pepa released an autobiography titled Let's Talk About Pep, co-written by Karen Hunter, which features an introduction by Queen Latifah and an epilogue by Missy Elliott. To accompany the book, she launched her own social network for fans and also starred in the reality TV series Let's Talk About Pep on VH1.

On May 9, 2009, Salt-N-Pepa performed at the Ladies of the 80s concert in Honolulu, which also featured SWV and Lisa Lisa. They performed at the Good Vibrations Festival in Australia in February 2010, and the South West Four Festival, Clapham Common, London on August 29, 2010. On October 12, 2010, Salt-N-Pepa received the I Am Hip Hop Award at the BET Hip Hop Awards.

On February 4, 2011, Salt-N-Pepa headed on a national tour titled Salt-N-Pepa's Legends of Hip Hop Tour. Other acts on the tour included Whodini, Rob Base, Kurtis Blow, Doug E Fresh, Biz Markie, Naughty By Nature, MC Lyte, Big Daddy Kane, Kool Moe Dee, Slick Rick, and Chubb Rock. On November 21, 2011, Salt-N-Pepa appeared on The X Factor Australia's third season with contestant and finalist Johnny Ruffo. They performed "Push It". On July 30, 2012, Salt-N-Pepa opened for rap group Public Enemy in Brooklyn, New York as part of the Martin Luther King Jr. Concert Series.

The trio made a November 2014 appearance in a Geico insurance commercial performing "Push It". Salt-N-Pepa appeared on the December 18, 2015 episode of The Wendy Williams Show performing "Push It". The performance started out with Wendy Williams pretending to be the DJ, thus Spinderella ultimately assumed the duties. This was an allusion to the fact that Roper, Williams, and several other women had auditioned for the part of DJ in the group back in 1987; the DJ role ultimately being won by Roper. The group's hit song "Shoop" made a comeback on February 12, 2016, as one of the theme songs featured in the blockbuster Marvel movie Deadpool. The trio performed in Red Deer, Alberta, Canada for Westerner Days at the Enmax Centrium on July 21, 2016.

In 2017–2018, the group toured as part of the I Love the 90's tour, performing in various locations, including in the UK Wembley Arena, Glasgow SSE, Liverpool Echo Arena and Birmingham. On October 16, 2018, Salt-N-Pepa appeared on the U.S. version of Who Wants to Be a Millionaire, with Kid N Play serving as their "plus one" in-studio lifeline.

On May 2, 2019, the Mixtape Tour commenced in Cincinnati, Ohio. Performers on this tour include Salt-N-Pepa, Debbie Gibson, Tiffany, and Naughty by Nature, with New Kids on the Block being billed as the headline performers. The next day, DJ Spinderella announced in an Instagram post that she had been "terminated" from Salt-N-Pepa as of January. She broke her silence after the band had not publicly announced their parting ways with her, insinuating that Salt-N-Pepa remained silent about the split in order to manipulate fans into thinking she was part of their upcoming projects. DJ Cocoa Chanelle, formerly of BET Networks and HOT 97, became the replacement DJ.

In March 2019, it was announced that Salt-N-Pepa would have a biographical miniseries coming to the Lifetime network, highlighting the rise of the group to become one of the first successful female rap groups in hip-hop. On January 23, 2021, Lifetime released an eponymous biopic, directed by Mario Van Peebles, which starred GG Townson as Salt, Laila Odom as Pepa, Monique Jasmine Paul as DJ Spinderella, Cleveland Berto as Hurby Azor, and featured Daniel Keith Morrison as MC Hammer, Denver Taylor as Martin Lawrence, Bronson Phillip Lake as Christopher "Kid" Reid, and Devante Senior as Christopher "Play" Martin. Salt and Pepa served as the executive producers while Queen Latifah served as a producer. A "Special Edition" of the film was released on January 23, 2021.

On November 4, 2022, all three members temporarily reunited to be honored with a star on the Hollywood Walk of Fame, located by the Amoeba Music store on Hollywood Boulevard.

=== 2022–present: Copyright dispute with Universal Music Group ===
In May 2025, Cheryl "Salt" James and Sandra "Pepa" Denton sued their record label, Universal Music Group, alleging that UMG blocked their attempts to exercise their copyright termination rights. Termination rights allow recording artists to reclaim the copyrights to their sound recordings 35 years after they were originally transferred. Salt and Pepa had filed formal termination notices with the United States Copyright Office on March 22, 2022, but UMG had claimed that the notices were "invalid and ineffective" because the original recording contract with Next Plateau Records in 1986 was not executed by Salt and Pepa themselves, but by their producer, Hurby Azor; and in the alternative, the recordings were works made for hire meaning the termination right could not be exercised.

In November 2025, all three members of Salt-N-Pepa appeared together to be inducted into the Rock and Roll Hall of Fame in the Musical Influence Award category. They spoke about their dispute with UMG at the induction ceremony.

On January 8, 2026, district judge Denise Cote dismissed the case, writing that the agreements executed by Salt-N-Pepa "do not indicate that Plaintiffs ever owned the copyrights to the sound recordings or that they granted a transfer of those rights to anyone else." While Judge Cote did not rule on whether the disputed recordings were actually works for hire, the court opinion noted that the recordings were registered as works for hire and that the "sole and exclusive owner" language in the 1986 recording contract was indicative of work-for-hire status. In a statement, UMG said that they welcomed the dismissal and "remain open and willing to find a resolution to the matter." Representatives for Salt-N-Pepa have said that they intend to appeal the decision.

== Discography ==
- Hot, Cool & Vicious (1986)
- A Salt with a Deadly Pepa (1988)
- Blacks' Magic (1990)
- Very Necessary (1993)
- Brand New (1997)

== Awards and nominations ==
American Music Awards
Year	Nominee / work	Award	Result
1989	Salt-N-Pepa	Favorite Soul/R&B Band, Duo, or Group	Nominated
1989	Salt-N-Pepa	Favorite Hip-Hop Artist	Nominated
1995	Salt-N-Pepa	Favorite Hip-Hop Artist	
1995	Salt-N-Pepa	Favorite Hip-Hop Artist	Nominated
1995	Salt-N-Pepa	Favorite R&B/Soul Duo or Group	Nominated
1995	"Whatta Man" (with En Vogue)	Favorite Soul/R&B Single	Nominated

Grammy Awards
Year	Nominee / work	Award	Result
1989	"Push It"	Best Rap Performance	Nominated
1992	"Let's Talk About Sex"	Best Rap Performance by a Duo or Group	Nominated
1995	"None of Your Business"	Best Rap Performance by a Duo or Group	Won
1995	"Whatta Man" (with En Vogue)	Best R&B Performance by a Duo or Group	Nominated
1997	"Champagne"	Best Rap Performance by a Duo or Group	Nominated
2021	Salt-N-Pepa	Grammy Lifetime Achievement Award	Won

Hollywood Walk of Fame
Year	Nominee / work	Award	Result
2022	Salt-N-Pepa	Star in the category of music	Won

MTV Video Music Awards
Year	Nominee / work	Award	Result
1994	"Whatta Man" (with En Vogue)	Best Dance Video	Won
1994	"Whatta Man" (with En Vogue)	Best R&B Video	Won
1994	"Whatta Man" (with En Vogue)	Best Choreography In A Video	Won
1995	"None of Your Business"	Best Choreography In A Video	Nominated
1995	"None of Your Business"	Best Dance Video	Nominated

Nickelodeon Kids' Choice Awards
Year	Nominee / work	Award	Result
1989	Salt-N-Pepa	Favorite Female Musician	Nominated

Soul Train Music Awards
Year	Nominee / work	Award	Result
1989	"A Salt with a Deadly Pepa"	Best Rap Album	Nominated

Soul Train Lady of Soul Awards
Year	Nominee / work	Award	Result
1995	Salt-N-Pepa	Entertainer of the Year	Won

VH1 Hip Hop Honors
Year	Nominee / work	Award	Result
2005	Salt-N-Pepa	Honoree	Won
2016	Salt-N-Pepa	Honoree	Won

== See also ==
- List of best-selling girl groups
- List of honorific titles in popular music
