= Next Plateau Entertainment =

American record label

- Parent company: Universal Music Group
- Founded: 1982
- Founder: Eddie O'Loughlin
- Distributor: Republic Records
- Genre: Various
- Country of origin: United States
- Location: New York City, New York
- Official website: NextPlateauEnt.com

Next Plateau Entertainment (formerly Next Plateau Records) is an American record label that currently operates in association with Republic Records.

== Background ==
1980s

New York City-based independent label Next Plateau Records began in the early 1980s and ultimately became a successful independent label. Writers and producers signed to the record company include John Robie, who produced C-bank’s single, “One More Shot”. The company also signed the female rap act Salt-N-Pepa, who went on to score several hits on the US Hot 100 including the songs "Push It" and "Shake Your Thang", and freestyle act Sweet Sensation, which had a hit with the song “I’m Hooked On You”.

1990s

During the 1990s Next Plateau had several hits on the American charts and some international charts with Paperboy’s “Ditty”; Sybil’s "Don't Make Me Over" and "Walk On By"; Boy Krazy’s “That’s What Love Can Do”; KWS’s “Please Don’t Go”; and with their biggest act, the female trio Salt-N-Pepa, with hits such as "Expression", "Do You Want Me", and “Let’s Talk About Sex”.

In 1992, Next Plateau entered a distributed agreement with PolyGram, via its London Records subsidiary. The company's assets (excluding the company's name) were later sold to PolyGram and absorbed into its Island Records branch, and is now controlled by Universal Music Group.

2000s

In 2004, Next Plateau was restarted by company founder Eddie O’Loughlin, who signed dance music twins Nina Sky. Next Plateau now focused on electro, dance, and trance music. Next Plateau’s Eddie O’Loughlin also has an A&R consultancy role in selecting the artists, songs, and producers for NBC's "The Voice" television show.

== Founder ==
Eddie O'Loughlin is the president and founder of Next Plateau Entertainment and previously co-founded the successful Midland International Records for RCA. O'Loughlin has a reputation for being a hands-on music executive. Celebrities that have worked with him, but not necessarily part of Next Plateau, include John Travolta, Carol Douglas, Silver Convention, Jenny Burton, Sharon Brown, Salt-N-Pepa, Paperboy, Sybil, Sweet Sensation, KWS, and Nina Sky.

Eddie O, as he is known in the business, is a member of ASCAP, a voting member of the Rock and Roll Hall of Fame, and the Grammy organization NARAS.

== Artists ==
=== Current ===
- JTX
- Sarah McLeod (musician)
- Nina Sky
- Madcon
- Crazy Frog
- Jamesy P
- Patrizio Buanne
- Staci Flood
- T2
- Gareth Emery
- Antoine Clamaran
- Ian Carey
- Mary Sarah

=== Some former acts ===
- 4 P.M.
- Antoinette
- Beat Thrillerz
- Black Rock & Ron
- HellRazor aka Robert S
- Boy Krazy
- Jenny Burton
- C-Bank
- Carol Douglas
- KWS
- Andrea Martin
- Paperboy
- Salt-N-Pepa
- Scotty D
- Sweet Sensation
- Sybil
- John Travolta
- Ultramagnetic MC's
- Ottawan
- Derelect Camp

== See also ==
- List of record labels
