= Hurby Azor =

Haitian hip hop producer

- Also known as: Hurby Luv Bug; Hurby's Machine; Fingerprints
- Born: Herby Azor; 1965 (age 60–61); Port-de-Paix, Haiti
- Origin: New York City, U.S.
- Genres: Hip hop; new jack swing
- Occupations: Musician; producer
- Instruments: Vocals; keyboard
- Years active: 1982–present

Hurby "Luv Bug" Azor (born 1965), also known as Fingerprints, is a Haitian musician and hip-hop music producer. He discovered and produced the hip-hop trio Salt-N-Pepa and the rap duo Kid 'n Play.

== Early life ==
Born in Port-de-Paix, Azor is Haitian.

== Career ==
In late 1985, with the rise of hip-hop response records all the rage, Azor and the group Salt-N-Pepa (then known as Super Nature) recorded a response to Doug E. Fresh & The Get Fresh Crew's "The Show" called "The Show Stoppa". He also went on to produce Dana Dane, Sweet Tee, Kwamé and others.

Azor wrote and performed in Salt-N-Pepa's music video for "Push It", on keyboards and backup vocals, and also wrote the trio's song "Let's Talk About Sex", among others. In 1995, he co-wrote and produced Snow's single "Anything for You", which became the top-selling single in Jamaica that year.

== Bibliography ==
- Kurutz, Steve, "Hurby 'Luv Bug' Azor", AllMusic.
