= Madison Beer discography =

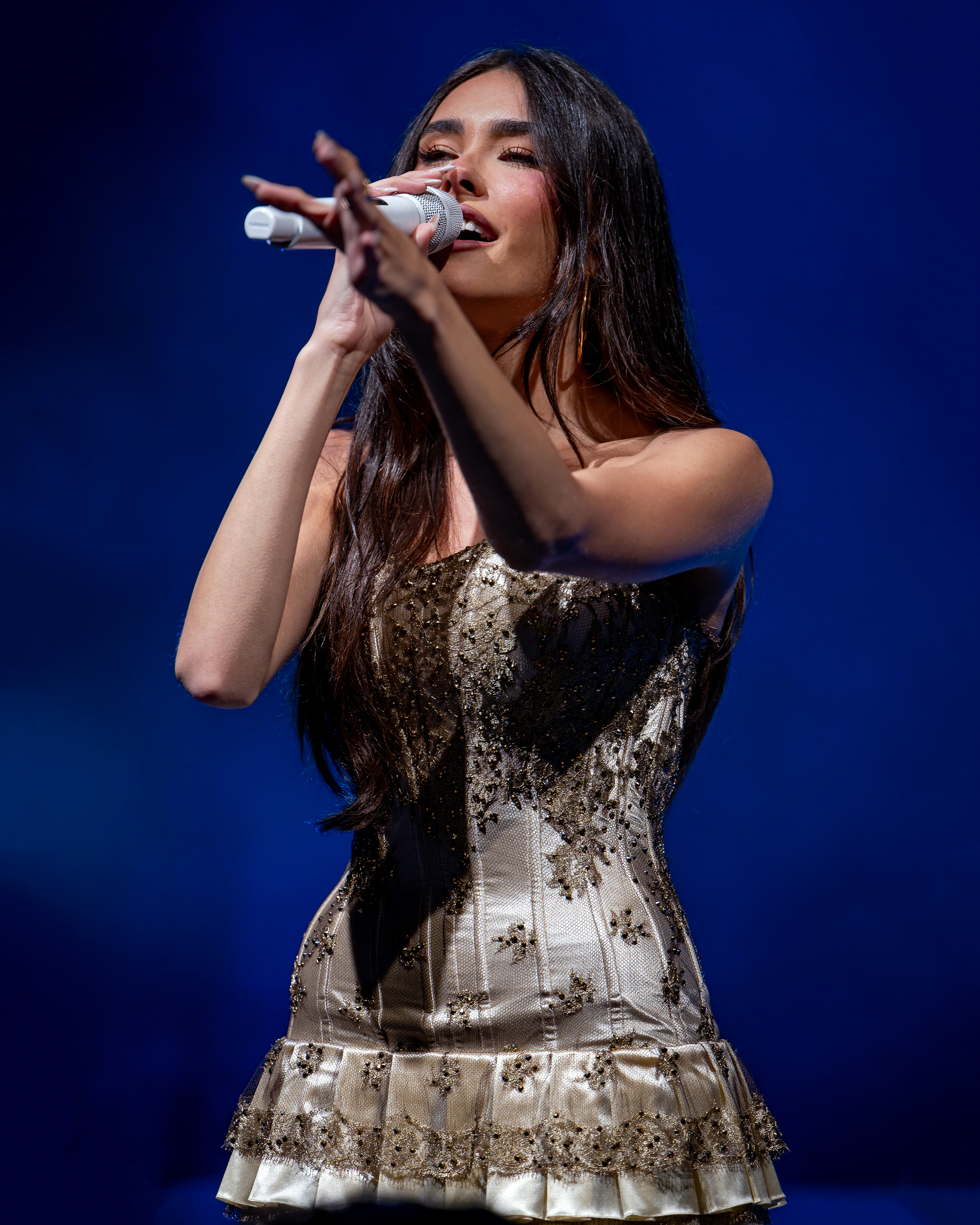
- Beer performing at the Greek Theatre during the Spinnin Tour in 2024
- Studio albums: 3
- EPs: 1
- Singles: 28
- Promotional singles: 5

American singer Madison Beer has released three studio albums, one extended play, twenty-eight singles (including three as a featured artist) and five promotional singles. Beer first gained recognition in 2012 after Canadian singer Justin Bieber posted a link to her YouTube cover of Etta James' "At Last". After signing with The Island Def Jam Music Group and Schoolboy Records, Beer released her debut single, "Melodies", followed by various other singles which were originally set to feature on her debut album; the album was later scrapped after Beer was dropped in 2015. Beer partnered with Access Records and released her debut extended play, As She Pleases (2018) which peaked at number 93 on the Billboard 200 and garnered various singles including "Dead" and "Home with You".

Following the singles "Hurts Like Hell", "Dear Society" and "All Day and Night", Beer announced that she had also signed with Epic Records and Sing It Loud in 2019, and began to work on her debut album. In 2020, Beer released a string of singles including "Selfish" which peaked at number 19 on the US Bubbling Under Hot 100 chart which acts as an extension to the US Billboard Hot 100 chart. She released her debut album Life Support (2021) which debuted at number 65 on the Billboard 200 and peaked top 40 in other various countries. In 2021, Beer released the single "Reckless". The single was one of multiple to preced her second studio album Silence Between Songs (2023) which saw limited success, debuting at 86 in the US.

In 2024, Beer released the single "Make You Mine" which found success through TikTok and peaked at number 9 on the Bubbling Under Hot 100 chart and number 10 on the US Pop Airplay chart marking her highest peak on both charts at the time. In 2025, she followed with various singles including "Yes Baby" which topped the US Dance/Mix Show Airplay chart, and "Bittersweet" which peaked at number 68 on the Billboard Hot 100, marking her first entry on the chart. The singles appeared on her third studio album Locket (2026), which debuted in the top 10 in various countries.

== Studio albums ==
List of studio albums, with selected details and chart positions
Title	Album details	Peak chart positions									
Title	Album details	US	AUS	AUT	CAN	IRE	NLD	NOR	NZ	SWI	UK
Life Support	Released: February 26, 2021; Label: Epic, Access; Format: CD, digital download, streaming, LP	65	36	39	23	21	32	34	33	55	28
Silence Between Songs	Released: September 15, 2023; Label: Epic, Sing It Loud; Format: Box set, CD, LP, digital download, streaming	86	76	71	84	59	39	—	31	—	28
Locket	Released: January 16, 2026; Label: Epic, Sing It Loud; Format: CD, LP, cassette, digital download, streaming	10	3	6	12	7	2	52	8	8	3
"—" denotes items which were not released in that country or failed to chart.

== Extended plays ==
List of extended plays, with selected details and chart positions
Title	Extended play details	Peak chart positions										Certifications
Title	Extended play details	US	AUS	AUT	CAN	FRA DL.	IRE	NZ Heat.	SCO	SWI	UK DL.	Certifications
As She Pleases	Released: February 2, 2018; Label: Access; Format: CD, digital download, streaming	93	64	68	62	27	38	3	91	68	16	RMNZ: Gold

== Singles ==
=== As lead artist ===
List of singles as lead artist, with selected chart positions, showing year released, certifications and album name
Title	Year	Peak chart positions										Certifications	Album
Title	Year	US	AUS	AUT	CAN	IRE	NLD	NOR	NZ Hot	SWI	UK	Certifications	Album
"Melodies"	2013	—	—	—	—	—	—	—	—	—	—		Non-album singles
"Unbreakable"	2014	—	—	—	—	—	—	—	—	—	—		Non-album singles
"All for Love" (featuring Jack & Jack)	2015	—	—	—	—	—	—	—	—	—	—		Non-album singles
"Something Sweet"	2015	—	—	—	—	—	—	—	—	—	—		Non-album singles
"Dead"	2017	—	—	—	—	—	—	—	—	—	— (Note: "Dead" did not enter the UK Singles Chart, but peaked at number 34 on the UK Independent Singles Chart.)	RIAA: Gold; ARIA: Platinum; BPI: Silver; MC: Platinum; RMNZ: Platinum	As She Pleases
"Say It to My Face"	2017	—	—	—	—	—	—	—	—	—	—		As She Pleases
"Home with You"	2018	— (Note: "Home with You" did not enter the Billboard Hot 100, but peaked at number 22 on the Pop Airplay chart.)	—	—	—	93	—	21	—	—	— (Note: "Home with You" did not enter the UK Singles Chart, but peaked at number 37 on the UK Independent Singles Chart.)	RIAA: Gold; ARIA: Gold; BPI: Silver; IFPI NOR: Platinum; MC: Platinum; RMNZ: Gold	As She Pleases
"Hurts Like Hell" (featuring Offset)	2018	— (Note: "Hurts Like Hell" did not enter the Billboard Hot 100, but peaked at number 26 on the Pop Airplay chart.)	—	73	—	84	—	—	28	—	—	RIAA: Gold; ARIA: Gold; BPI: Silver; MC: Platinum; RMNZ: Gold	Non-album single
"All Day and Night" (with Jax Jones and Martin Solveig)	2019	— (Note: "All Day and Night" did not enter the Billboard Hot 100, but peaked at number 14 on the Hot Dance/Electronic Songs chart.)	—	60	—	7	74	—	29	77	10	BPI: Platinum; SNEP: Gold; MC: Gold; RMNZ: Gold	Snacks
"Dear Society"	2019	—	—	—	—	74	—	—	21	—	96	ARIA: Gold	Non-album single
"Good in Goodbye"	2020	—	—	—	—	—	—	—	15	—	— (Note: "Good in Goodbye" did not enter the UK Singles Chart, but peaked at number 91 on the UK Video Streaming Chart.)	PMB: Platinum; RMNZ: Gold	Life Support
"Selfish"	2020	— (Note: "Selfish" did not enter the Billboard Hot 100, but peaked at number 19 on the Bubbling Under Hot 100 chart.)	54	—	72	25	—	—	16	—	53	RIAA: Platinum; BPI: Sliver; MC: Gold; PMB: Platinum; RMNZ: Platinum	Life Support
"Baby"	2020	—	—	—	—	68	—	—	9	—	86	PMB: Platinum	Life Support
"Boyshit"	2020	—	—	—	—	—	—	—	22	—	—		Life Support
"Carried Away" (with Surf Mesa)	2021	—	—	—	—	—	—	—	14	—	—		Non-album single
"Reckless"	2021	— (Note: "Reckless" did not enter the Billboard Hot 100, but peaked at number 38 on the Pop Airplay chart.)	—	—	—	98	—	—	11	—	—	BPI: Silver; PMB: Gold; RMNZ: Gold	Silence Between Songs
"Dangerous"	2022	—	—	—	—	—	—	—	35	—	—		Silence Between Songs
"Showed Me (How I Fell in Love with You)"	2022	—	—	—	—	—	—	—	—	—	— (Note: "Showed Me (How I Fell in Love with You)" did not enter the UK Singles Chart, but peaked at number 15 on the UK Singles Downloads Chart.)		Silence Between Songs
"Home to Another One"	2023	—	—	—	—	—	—	—	23	—	—		Silence Between Songs
"Spinnin"	2023	—	—	—	—	—	—	—	32	—	—		Silence Between Songs
"Make You Mine"	2024	— (Note: "Make You Mine" did not enter the Billboard Hot 100, but peaked at number 9 on the Bubbling Under Hot 100 chart.)	— (Note: "Make You Mine" did not enter the top 50 of the ARIA Singles Chart, but peaked at number 20 on the ARIA New Music Singles Chart.)	—	82	33	65	35	8	85	50	BPI: Silver; RMNZ: Gold; ZPAV: Platinum	Locket
"15 Minutes"	2024	— (Note: "15 Minutes" did not enter the Billboard Hot 100, but peaked at number 3 on the Dance/Mix Show Airplay chart.)	—	—	—	—	—	—	28	—	— (Note: "15 Minutes" did not enter the UK Singles Chart, but peaked at number 45 on the UK Singles Downloads Chart.)		Non-album single
"Yes Baby"	2025	— (Note: "Yes Baby" did not enter the Billboard Hot 100, but peaked at number 11 on the Hot Dance/Pop Songs chart.)	—	—	—	99	—	—	11	—	— (Note: "Yes Baby" did not enter the UK Singles Chart, but peaked at number 59 on the UK Singles Downloads Chart.)		Locket
"Bittersweet"	2025	68	80	—	62	74	—	—	8	—	81		Locket
"Bad Enough"	2026	— (Note: "Bad Enough" did not enter the Billboard Hot 100, but peaked at number 3 on the Bubbling Under Hot 100 chart.)	—	—	—	—	—	—	8	—	—		Locket
"—" denotes items which were not released in that country or failed to chart.

=== As featured artist ===
List of singles as featured artist, with selected chart positions, showing year released and album name
Title	Year	Peak chart positions										Album
Title	Year	US Dig.	US World	CAN Dig.	FRA Dig.	JPN Hot	KOR	NZ Hot	UK Dig.	UK Indie	Certifications	Album
"I Won't Let You Walk Away" (Mako featuring Madison Beer)	2015	— (Note: "I Won't Let You Walk Away" did not enter the Digital Songs chart, but peaked at number 33 on the Dance/Electronic Digital Songs.)	—	—	—	—	—	—	—	—		Non-album singles
"Pop/Stars" (with (G)I-dle and Jaira Burns as K/DA)	2018	30	1	30	86	13	39	6	75	17	RIAA: Platinum; RMNZ: Gold	Non-album singles
"More" (with (G)I-dle, Lexie Liu, Jaira Burns and Seraphine as K/DA)	2020	—	1	48	—	—	96	—	—	23	RIAA: Gold	All Out
"—" denotes items which were not released in that country or failed to chart.

=== Promotional singles ===
List of promotional singles, with selected chart positions, showing year released and album name
Title	Year	Peak chart positions	Album
Title	Year	NZ Hot	Album
"Stained Glass"	2020	20	Life Support
"Blue"	2021	19	Life Support
"Everything Happens for a Reason"	2021	—	Life Support
"Room for You"	2021	—	Clifford the Big Red Dog
"I Have Never Felt More Alive"(from Fall)	2022	—	Non-album promotional single
"—" denotes items which were not released in that country or failed to chart.

== Other charted songs ==
Title	Year	Peak chart positions		Album
Title	Year	US World	NZ Hot	Album
"Villain" (with K/DA featuring Kim Petras)	2020	4	21	All Out
"Sweet Relief"	2023	—	28	Silence Between Songs
"All at Once"	2025	—	39	F1 the Album
"Locket Theme"	2026	—	19	Locket
"Angel Wings"	2026	—	14	Locket
"You're Still Everything"	2026	—	12	Locket
"Lovergirl"	2026	—	16	Locket (deluxe)
"—" denotes items which were not released in that country or failed to chart.

== Other appearances ==
Title	Year	Other artist(s)	Album
"We Are Monster High"	2013	—N/a	Monster High
"Blame It on Love"	2018	David Guetta	7
"The Ambition"	2026	Zara Larsson, Bambii	Midnight Sun: Girls Trip
