= The Locket Tour =

2026 concert tour by Madison Beer

- Tour by Madison Beer
- Promotional poster
- Location: Europe; North America
- Associated album: Locket
- Start date: May 11, 2026
- End date: July 13, 2026
- No. of shows: 32
- Supporting acts: Isabel LaRosa; Thủy; Lulu Simon

Madison Beer concert chronology
- The Spinnin Tour (2024); The Locket Tour (2026)

The Locket Tour was the fourth concert tour by the American singer Madison Beer in support of her third studio album, Locket (2026). It commenced on May 11, 2026, in Kraków, with shows across Europe and North America. It concluded in New York City on July 13, 2026, featuring 32 shows. Isabel LaRosa, Thủy and Lulu Simon served as the opening acts.

== Background ==
On January 13, 2026, Beer announced a 32-date European & North American tour, titled The Locket Tour. Alongside the announcement of the tour, it has been revealed that there would have been an artist presale going on sale on January 19, 2026 with the general sale going on sale on January 21, 2026. The tour was held in several arenas, making it Beer's biggest headlining tour to date.

== Set list ==
This set list is from the concert in Kraków on May 11, 2026.

1. "Yes Baby"
2. "15 Minutes"
3. "Boyshit"
4. "Home to Another One"
5. "Bad Enough"
6. "Reckless"
7. "Locket Theme (extended)"
8. "Somehow I Got Lucky"
9. "Healthy Habit"
10. "Envy the Leaves"
11. "Nothing at All"
12. "Dear Society"
13. Surprise song
14. "Spinnin"
15. "Selfish"
16. "You're Still Everything"
17. "Angel Wings"
18. "Baby"
19. "For the Night"
20. "Free"
21. "Complexity"
22. "Lovergirl"
23. "Make You Mine"
24. "Bittersweet"

=== Surprise songs ===
During each concert, Beer performs one of three proposed songs from her discography during each show to perform.

- May 11, 2026 – Kraków: "Sour Times"
- May 13, 2026 – Vienna: "King of Everything"
- May 14, 2026 – Munich: “Sweet Relief"
- May 15, 2026 – Düsseldorf: "Emotional Bruises"
- May 17, 2026 – Hamburg: "Blue"
- May 19, 2026 – Berlin: "Default"
- May 21, 2026 – Amsterdam: "Homesick"
- May 22, 2026 – Paris: "Stay Numb and Carry On"
- May 24, 2026 – Madrid: "Sour Times"
- May 26, 2026 – Barcelona: "Tyler Durden"
- May 28, 2026 – Antwerp: "Homesick"
- May 30, 2026 – London: "Good in Goodbye"
- May 31, 2026 – Manchester: "Default"
- June 8, 2026 – Austin: "Good in Goodbye"
- June 9, 2026 – Irving: "Stay Numb and Carry On"
- June 13, 2026 – Winchester: (Note: Labelled as Las Vegas in promotion material.) "King of Everything"
- June 15, 2026 – Vancouver: "Blue"
- June 16, 2026 – Seattle: "At Your Worst"
- June 20, 2026 – Phoenix: "Sour Times"
- June 21, 2026 – San Diego: "Homesick"
- June 23, 2026 – San Francisco: "Tyler Durden"
- June 24, 2026 – Inglewood: (Note: Labelled as Los Angeles in promotion material.) "Fools"
- June 29, 2026 – Chicago: "Effortlessly" and "Follow the White Rabbit"
- July 1, 2026 – Atlanta: "Blue"
- July 2, 2026 – Hollywood: "Sweet Relief"
- July 5, 2026 – Raleigh: "Tyler Durden"
- July 6, 2026 – Washington, D.C.: "Follow the White Rabbit"
- July 7, 2026 - Philadelphia: "Tyler Durden"
- July 9, 2026 - Detroit: "Effortlessly"
- July 10, 2026 - Toronto: "Good in Goodbye"
- July 12, 2026 – Boston: "Effortlessly" and "Ryder"
- July 13, 2026 – New York City: "Dead"

== Shows ==
List of concerts, showing date, city, country, venue and opening acts
Dates (2026)	City	Country	Venue	Opening act(s)
May 11	Kraków	Poland	Tauron Arena	Lulu Simon; Isabel LaRosa
May 13	Vienna	Austria	Marx Halle	Lulu Simon; Isabel LaRosa
May 14	Munich	Germany	Zenith	Lulu Simon; Isabel LaRosa
May 15	Düsseldorf	Germany	Mitsubishi Electric Halle	Lulu Simon; Isabel LaRosa
May 17	Hamburg	Germany	Alsterdorfer Sporthalle	Lulu Simon; Isabel LaRosa
May 19	Berlin	Germany	Max-Schmeling-Halle	Lulu Simon; Isabel LaRosa
May 21	Amsterdam	Netherlands	Ziggo Dome	Lulu Simon; Isabel LaRosa
May 22	Paris	France	Adidas Arena	Lulu Simon; Isabel LaRosa
May 24	Madrid	Spain	Palacio Vistalegre	Lulu Simon; Isabel LaRosa
May 26	Barcelona	Spain	Sant Jordi Club	Lulu Simon; Isabel LaRosa
May 28	Antwerp	Belgium	Lotto Arena	Lulu Simon; Isabel LaRosa
May 30	London	England	The O_{2} Arena	Lulu Simon; Isabel LaRosa
May 31	Manchester	England	Co-op Live	Lulu Simon; Isabel LaRosa
June 8	Austin	United States	Moody Center	Lulu Simon; Thủy
June 9	Irving	United States	The Pavilion at Toyota Music Factory	Lulu Simon; Thủy
June 13	Winchester	United States	Fontainebleau Las Vegas	Lulu Simon; Thủy
June 15	Vancouver	Canada	Thunderbird Sports Centre	Lulu Simon; Thủy
June 16	Seattle	United States	Paramount Theatre	Lulu Simon; Thủy
June 20	Phoenix	United States	Arizona Financial Theatre	Lulu Simon; Thủy
June 21	San Diego	United States	Gallagher Square	Lulu Simon; Thủy
June 23	San Francisco	United States	Bill Graham Civic Auditorium	Lulu Simon; Thủy
June 24	Inglewood	United States	Kia Forum	Lulu Simon; Thủy
June 29	Chicago	United States	Huntington Bank Pavilion (Note: Venue upgraded from Byline Bank Aragon Ballroom due to demand.)	Lulu Simon; Thủy
July 1	Atlanta	United States	Coca-Cola Roxy	Lulu Simon; Thủy
July 2	Hollywood	United States	Hard Rock Live	Lulu Simon; Thủy
July 5	Raleigh	United States	Red Hat Amphitheater	Lulu Simon; Thủy
July 6	Washington, D.C.	United States	The Anthem	Lulu Simon; Thủy
July 7	Philadelphia	United States	The Met	Lulu Simon; Thủy
July 9	Detroit	United States	Fox Theatre	Lulu Simon; Thủy
July 10	Toronto	Canada	Coca-Cola Coliseum	Lulu Simon; Thủy
July 12	Boston	United States	MGM Music Hall at Fenway	Lulu Simon; Thủy
July 13	New York City	United States	Madison Square Garden	Lulu Simon; Thủy

== Notes ==
Show details
