= Life Support (Madison Beer album) =

Studio album by Madison Beer
- Released: February 26, 2021
- Recorded: August 2018 – August 2019
- Genres: Pop; R&B
- Length: 46:30
- Labels: Access; Epic
- Producers: 1993; Madison Beer; Leroy Clampitt; Pete Nappi; One Love

Madison Beer chronology
As She Pleases (2018)	Life Support (2021)	Silence Between Songs (2023)

Singles from Life Support
- 1. "Good in Goodbye" Released: January 31, 2020; 2. "Selfish" Released: February 14, 2020; 3. "Baby" Released: August 21, 2020; 4. "Boyshit" Released: December 11, 2020

Life Support is the debut studio album by American singer Madison Beer. It was released on February 26, 2021, by Access and Epic Records. Conceived as a concept album created in the midst of Beer's major depressive episode and diagnosis with borderline personality disorder, the album lyrically revolves around the themes of mental health, grief and heartbreak, as well as Beer's experiences with public scrutiny, building resilience during the making of the record, and referring to it as her "life support". Musically, Life Support is a pop and R&B record with elements of indie pop. Beer herself co-wrote the entire album, and co-produced most of the record.

Life Support was promoted by the release of four singles; "Good in Goodbye", "Selfish", "Baby" and "Boyshit", and three promotional singles; "Stained Glass", "Blue" and "Everything Happens for a Reason". The album debuted and peaked at number 65 on the US Billboard 200 and reached the top 40 in the United Kingdom, Canada, and other countries.

== Background ==
On November 9, 2018, Beer released "Hurts Like Hell" as the lead single from her then untitled debut studio album. After its release, Beer revealed that the album would be released sometime in 2019. "Hurts Like Hell" was later removed from the album and "Dear Society" replaced it as the album's lead single, which was released on May 17, 2019. In August 2019, the album's title Life Support was leaked. Shortly after that, Beer announced that she had signed with Epic Records and that she planned to release new music soon. Beer wrote the album with the intent of truly expressing herself and having her own voice, stating "I feel like I'm finally being seen for things that I value and being viewed for things that I actually feel really good about. And my music I feel like is speaking for itself," adding "This is who I am." She also shared that she wanted to show that mental health issues and internet perfection are not exclusive of one another, stating "'You have a perfect life.' And I'm like, no, I want to show you even if it looks like I do, I am also struggling severely and in therapy every single day and I'm on anxiety medication. I just wanted to deconstruct this idea that people have that if you present like you have a perfect life on social media, that doesn't mean that you actually do," signifying that she wanted to express that not everything you see means someone's life is perfect. Describing the album in three words, she chose "Honest, brave and badass". Her favorite track lyrically is "Effortlessly".

With my album, I made a promise to myself that this is going to be my time to express honestly and truthfully how I've been feeling. I could finally tell my story the way I wanted to tell it and touch on things like medications that are harmful for young adults that I’ve been put on, and real shit I've never been able to talk about

— Beer speaking about the album.

== Music and lyrics ==
Life Support was described by reviewers as a dark, personal, and sad album influenced by R&B, indie pop, and pop. In an interview with Zach Sang and Dan Zolot, Beer confirmed that she was inspired by a variety of artists, including Tame Impala, Lana Del Rey, Ariana Grande and Twenty One Pilots. Lyrically, the album deals with mental health, self reflection, grief, and breaking one free of restraints.

"Good in Goodbye" is a break-up anthem with a dark melody that, according to Beer, is about "cutting ties with a toxic person, no matter how tough it can feel at the time, is sometimes the only way forward." "Default", a sentimental ballad, details Beer's struggles with anxiety and suicidal ideation. "Selfish" is a slow-tempo pop "breakup ballad" with stripped down production that emphasizes Beer's vocals. Lyrically, the song is about toxic relationships. "Stained Glass" is a downbeat ballad about public scrutiny and Beer's struggles with mental health. The song's production begins with just piano before adding drums on the song's chorus and Beer's vocal performance was described as "haunting and beautiful". "Sour Times" was inspired by Tame Impala, with lyrics detailing Beer's experiences with harassment and getting taken advantage due to a mentally vulnerable state. The country ballad "Homesick" samples a dialogue of the sci-fi animated sitcom Rick and Morty, which Madison states is her favorite cartoon. Primarily, the songs talks about social alienation and Beer's abandonment issues, by referencing her beliefs in outer space species. The album closes with "Everything Happens For A Reason", a country ballad with 50s-60s influences, in which the lyrics suggest that Beer will never heal from her pain, but remains looking for the reason.

The main writers of the album, Kinetics & One Love, who also worked with Beer on As She Pleases are also writers of fellow artist Melanie Martinez, whom Beer is inspired by and "loves", and is the reason she chose her writers specifically.

In a March 2026 interview with Zach Sang, Beer reveals that Raye had songwriting credits for the songs "Home with You", "Follow the White Rabbit", and "Default", which includes "Home With You" initially being an unreleased demo track by Raye.

== Singles ==
"Good in Goodbye" was released as the album's lead single on January 31, 2020. It reached number 15 on the New Zealand Hot Singles chart and impacted contemporary hit radio in Italy on April 3, 2020. A music video was released to accompany the song's release.

"Selfish" was released as the album's second single on February 14, 2020. It reached number 19 on the US Bubbling Under Hot 100 chart as well as entering official charts in Canada, Ireland and the UK. It impacted contemporary hit radio in the United States on May 19, 2020. The song also received a music video that was directed by Beer herself.

=== Promotional singles ===
"Stained Glass" was released on April 3, 2020, as the album's promotional single.

== Tour ==
On May 17, 2021, Beer announced a 26-date North American tour, titled The Life Support Tour, which had a 23-date European leg announced on June 9. On July 30, she announced Maggie Lindemann and Audriix would be the opening acts for the North American leg. Leah Kate was announced as the European leg opener on March 15, 2022. The American leg of the tour began on October 18, 2021, in Toronto at Queen Elizabeth Theatre and ended on November 28, 2021, in Los Angeles at The Wiltern. The European leg began on March 28, 2022, in Madrid at La Riviera and concluded on April 28, 2022, in Oslo at Vulkan Arena.

The Life Support Tour
- Tour by Madison Beer
- Associated album: Life Support
- Start date: October 18, 2021
- End date: April 28, 2022
- Legs: 2
- No. of shows: 27 in North America; 23 in Europe; 50 in total

Madison Beer concert chronology
- As She Pleases Tour (2018); The Life Support Tour (2021–2022); The Spinnin Tour (2024)

=== Setlist ===
The following setlist was obtained from the October 18, 2021 concert, held at Queen Elizabeth Theatre in Toronto, Canada. It does not represent all concerts for the duration of the tour.

1. "The Beginning" (Intro)
2. "Baby" (Extended)
3. "Good in Goodbye"
4. "Stay Numb and Carry On"
5. "Emotional Bruises"
6. "Reckless"
7. "Homesick"
8. "Stained Glass"
9. "Default"
10. "Effortlessly"
11. "Selfish"
12. "Interlude" / "Blue"
13. "Sour Times"
14. "Dear Society"
15. "Boyshit"
16. "Has Anyone Seen the White Rabbit?" (Interlude)
17. "Follow the White Rabbit"

Encore

18. "Everything Happens for a Reason"

Notes

• During the show in Oslo, "Channel Surfing / The End" was performed.

=== Shows ===
List of concerts
Date	City	Country	Venue	Opening act(s)
North America
October 18, 2021	Toronto	Canada	Queen Elizabeth Theatre	Maggie Lindemann; Audriix
October 20, 2021	Montréal	Canada	L'Olympia	Maggie Lindemann; Audriix
October 22, 2021	New Haven	United States	Toad's Place	Maggie Lindemann; Audriix
October 24, 2021	New York City	United States	Terminal 5	Maggie Lindemann; Audriix
October 25, 2021	Boston	United States	House of Blues	Maggie Lindemann; Audriix
October 26, 2021	Philadelphia	United States	Theatre of Living Arts	Maggie Lindemann; Audriix
October 28, 2021	Silver Spring	United States	The Fillmore	Maggie Lindemann; Audriix
October 30, 2021	Charlotte	United States	The Underground	Maggie Lindemann; Audriix
October 31, 2021	Atlanta	United States	Buckhead Theatre	Maggie Lindemann; Audriix
November 2, 2021	Lake Buena Vista	United States	House of Blues	Maggie Lindemann; Audriix
November 3, 2021	Fort Lauderdale	United States	Revolution Live	Maggie Lindemann; Audriix
November 5, 2021	New Orleans	United States	House of Blues	Maggie Lindemann; Audriix
November 6, 2021	Dallas	United States	The Echo Lounge & Music Hall	Maggie Lindemann; Audriix
November 7, 2021	Houston	United States	House of Blues	Maggie Lindemann; Audriix
November 9, 2021	Nashville	United States	Brooklyn Bowl	Maggie Lindemann; Audriix
November 11, 2021	Detroit	United States	Saint Andrew's Hall	Maggie Lindemann; Audriix
November 12, 2021	Chicago	United States	House of Blues	Maggie Lindemann; Audriix
November 14, 2021	Minneapolis	United States	Varsity Theater	Maggie Lindemann; Audriix
November 15, 2021	Kansas City	United States	The Truman	Maggie Lindemann; Audriix
November 17, 2021	Denver	United States	Summit Music Hall	Maggie Lindemann; Audriix
November 18, 2021	Salt Lake City	United States	The Depot	Maggie Lindemann; Audriix
November 20, 2021	Portland	United States	Roseland Theater	Maggie Lindemann; Audriix
November 21, 2021	Vancouver	Canada	Vogue Theatre	Maggie Lindemann; Audriix
November 22, 2021	Seattle	United States	Neptune Theatre	Maggie Lindemann; Audriix
November 24, 2021	San Diego	United States	House of Blues	Maggie Lindemann; Audriix
November 27, 2021	San Francisco	United States	The Fillmore	Maggie Lindemann; Audriix
November 28, 2021	Los Angeles	United States	Wiltern Theatre	Maggie Lindemann; Audriix
Europe
March 28, 2022	Madrid	Spain	Sala Riviera	Leah Kate
March 29, 2022	Barcelona	Spain	Razzmatazz	Leah Kate
April 1, 2022	Milan	Italy	Fabrique	Leah Kate
April 2, 2022	Ciampino	Italy	Orion Live Club	Leah Kate
April 3, 2022	Zürich	Switzerland	X-tra	Leah Kate
April 4, 2022	Munich	Germany	Backstage Werk	Leah Kate
April 6, 2022	Frankfurt	Germany	Batschkapp	Leah Kate
April 7, 2022	Cologne	Germany	Live Music Hall	Leah Kate
April 9, 2022	Brussels	Belgium	La Madeleine	Leah Kate
April 10, 2022	Paris	France	L'Olympia	Leah Kate
April 12, 2022	London	England	O2 Shepherds Bush Empire	Leah Kate
April 13, 2022	London	England	O2 Shepherds Bush Empire	Leah Kate
April 15, 2022	Manchester	England	Manchester Academy	Leah Kate
April 16, 2022	Birmingham	England	O2 Institute	Leah Kate
April 18, 2022	Dublin	Ireland	Olympia Theatre	Leah Kate
April 19, 2022	Belfast	Northern Ireland	Ulster Hall	Leah Kate
April 20, 2022	Glasgow	Scotland	O2 Academy Glasgow	Leah Kate
April 22, 2022	Amsterdam	Netherlands	Melkweg	Leah Kate
April 23, 2022	Berlin	Germany	Metropol	Leah Kate
April 24, 2022	Hanover	Germany	Capitol Hannover	Leah Kate
April 26, 2022	Copenhagen	Denmark	Amager Bio	Leah Kate
April 27, 2022	Stockholm	Sweden	Fryshuset Klubben	Leah Kate
April 28, 2022	Oslo	Norway	Vulkan Arena	Leah Kate

== Critical reception ==
Professional ratings
Aggregate scores
Source	Rating
Metacritic	71/100
Review scores
Source	Rating
AllMusic	3.5/5 stars
Beats Per Minute	72%
NME	4/5 stars
Pitchfork	5.9/10

Life Support was met with positive reviews from critics upon its release, many of whom praised her vocal performance and the album's subject matter. According to Metacritic, which assigns a weighted average score out of 100 to ratings and reviews from mainstream critics, critics gave Life Support a score of 71, based on four reviews, indicating "generally favorable reviews".

Writing for Beats Per Minute, JT Early said: "Life Support is a lovingly-crafted project which explores mental health, heartbreak, toxicity and self-assertion. The album presents an array of lush pop and R&B tracks connected through decadent orchestration. The soundscapes here are cinematic and cohesive, while Beer's versatile vocals easily go from sultry to dreamily resonant to emphatically cold. Life Support is a victorious debut from a singer whose determination and passion has allowed her to overcome any naysayers and detractors." Hannah Mylrea of NME wrote: "On a lesser album, the eclecticism might lead to a lack of coherence, but this record is always threaded through with Beer's diaristic lyricism. With its consistent, gut-punching honesty and witty wordplay, you'll always find something special on Life Support." Marcy Donelson of AllMusic said: "The album's 17 tracks address subject matter including breakups, grief, and struggles with mental health with a mix of pop, R&B, and alternative stylings."

== Commercial performance ==
Life Support entered the national charts in various territories. In the United States, it debuted at number 65 on the US Billboard 200 with 11,800 album equivalent units, according to Rolling Stone charts. In the United Kingdom, the album debuted at number 28, making it Beer's first top 40 on the country. Elsewhere, the album debuted at number 21 in Ireland, number 23 on Canada, and number 33 in New Zealand.

== Track listing ==
Life Support track listing
No.	Title	Writer(s)	Producer(s)	Length
1.	"The Beginning"	Madison Beer; Leroy Clampitt	Beer; Clampitt	0:58
2.	"Good in Goodbye"	Beer; Elizabeth Lowell Boland; Isaiah Libeau; Clampitt; Jeremy Dussolliet; Timothy Sommers	Beer; Clampitt; One Love; Smoke^{[m]}	2:22
3.	"Default"	Beer; Rachel Keen; Clampitt	Beer; Clampitt	1:57
4.	"Follow the White Rabbit"	Beer; Keen; Clampitt	Beer; Clampitt	3:00
5.	"Effortlessly"	Beer; Boland; Clampitt; Paul Shelton	Beer; Clampitt	2:49
6.	"Stay Numb and Carry On"	Beer; Clampitt; Dussolliet; Sommers	Beer; Clampitt; One Love	2:44
7.	"Blue"	Beer; Boland; Clampitt	Beer; Clampitt	3:50
8.	"Interlude"	Beer; Boland; Clampitt	Beer; Clampitt	1:50
9.	"Homesick"	Beer; Boland; Dussolliet; Sommers	Beer; Clampitt	3:47
10.	"Selfish"	Beer; Boland; Jaramye Daniels; Dussolliet; Clampitt; Sommers	Beer; Clampitt	3:43
11.	"Sour Times"	Beer; Boland; Clampitt; Dussolliet; Sommers	Beer; Clampitt	2:45
12.	"Boyshit"	Beer; Taylor Upsahl; Jake Banfield; Clampitt; Pete Nappi	Clampitt; Nappi; Bart Schoudel^{[v]}	2:40
13.	"Baby"	Beer; Boland; Dussolliet; Clampitt; Sommers	Beer; Clampitt; One Love	3:28
14.	"Stained Glass"	Beer; Dussolliet; Clampitt; Sommers	Beer; Clampitt; One Love	3:28
15.	"Emotional Bruises"	Beer; Boland; E. Kidd Bogart; Larus Arnarson; Clampitt	Beer; Clampitt; 1993	3:01
16.	"Everything Happens for a Reason"	Beer; Clampitt	Beer; Clampitt	2:26
17.	"Channel Surfing / The End"	Beer; Boland; Clampitt; Shelton; Dussolliet; Sommers	Beer; Clampitt	1:44
Total length:				46:32

=== Notes ===
- "Boyshit" is stylized in all caps.
- "Homesick" contains excerpts from the adult animated sitcom, Rick and Morty, performed by Justin Roiland.
- "Channel Surfing / The End" samples Beer's 2019 single "Dear Society" as well as parts of a demo version of "Stained Glass".

== Personnel ==
Credits adapted from Tidal.

- Madison Beer – vocals (all tracks), backing vocals (tracks 2,12), songwriting (all tracks), production (tracks 1–11,13–17), executive production (all tracks)
- Leroy Clampitt – songwriting (1–5,7,8,10–17), production (all tracks), executive production (all tracks), bass (1–11,13,15–17), guitar (1,2,4–7,14,16), keyboards (1,2,5,8–11,13,15), programming (1,2,5,7–14,16), vocal production (1–16), drums (2,4–11,13–17), piano (3,12,17), synthesizer (3,4,7,12), strings (7), record engineering (10), electric guitar (12)
- Kinetics & One Love – songwriting (2,6,9,10,11,13,14,17)
  - One Love – production (2,6,13,14), bass (2,13), drums (2,6,13), keyboards (2,13), programming (2,6,11,13), piano (11), vocal production (13), backing vocals (17)
- Elizabeth Lowell Bowland – songwriting (2,5–11,13,15,17), vocals (6), backing vocals (2,5,11,17), synthesizer (13)
- Isaiah Dominique Libeau – songwriting (2)
- Rachel Keen – songwriting (3,4), keyboards (3)
- Paul "Phamous" Shelton – songwriting (5,17), backing vocals (5)
- Jaramye Daniels – songwriting (10)
- Jake Banfield – songwriting (12)
- Pete Nappi – songwriting (12), production (12), bass (12), guitar (12), keyboards (12), programming (12)
- Upsahl – songwriting (12), backing vocals (12)
- 1993 – production (15)
- E. Kidd Bogart – songwriting (15)
- Larus "Leo" Arnarson – songwriting (15), bass (15), drums (15), keyboards (15)
- Oscar Scivier – executive production (all tracks)
- Smoke – miscellaneous production (2), programming (2)
- Bart Schoudel – vocal engineering (12), vocal production (12)
- Kinga Bacik – strings (1,16,17), cello (3,6,10)
- Chris Gehringer – mastering (all tracks)
- Mitch McCarthy – mixing (all tracks)

=== Design ===
- Amber Park – creative direction, design
- Amber Asaly – photography
- Isabella Pettinato Santos – assistant

== Charts ==
Chart performance
Chart (2021)	Peak position
Australian Albums (ARIA)	36
Austrian Albums (Ö3 Austria)	39
Belgian Albums (Ultratop Flanders)	47
Belgian Albums (Ultratop Wallonia)	129
Canadian Albums (Billboard)	23
Dutch Albums (Album Top 100)	32
French Albums (SNEP)	134
German Albums (Offizielle Top 100)	85
Irish Albums (Official Charts)	21
Lithuanian Albums (AGATA)	40
New Zealand Albums (RMNZ)	33
Norwegian Albums (VG-lista)	34
Spanish Albums (PROMUSICAE)	46
Swiss Albums (Schweizer Hitparade)	55
UK Albums (Official Charts)	28
US Billboard 200	65

Chart (2026)	Peak position
Greek Albums (IFPI)	47
