= Hurts Like Hell =

2018 single by Madison Beer featuring Offset

Single by Madison Beer featuring Offset
- Released: November 9, 2018
- Genre: Dark pop
- Length: 3:27
- Label: Access
- Songwriters: Madison Beer; Kiari Cephus; Charlotte Aitchison; Jason Pebworth; George Astasio; Jon Shave; Mike Sabath
- Producers: The Invisible Men; Mike Sabath

Madison Beer singles chronology
"Pop/Stars" (2018)	"Hurts Like Hell" (2018)	"All Day and Night" (2019)

Offset singles chronology
"Zeze" (2018)	"Hurts Like Hell" (2018)	"Red Room" (2019)

Music video
- "Hurts Like Hell" on YouTube

"Hurts Like Hell" is a song recorded by American singer Madison Beer, featuring American rapper Offset. The single was released through record label Access Records on November 9, 2018, through digital download and streaming formats. The song was written by Beer, Offset, and British singer Charli XCX, alongside the song's producers, The Invisible Men and Mike Sabath. It was originally intended to be the lead single from Beer's debut studio album, but was later removed from the album. On January 31, 2026, it was removed from streaming platforms such as Apple Music and Spotify, but re-uploaded the next day.

== Background ==
"Hurts Like Hell" follows Beer's debut EP, As She Pleases (2018), as well as her collaboration with (G)I-dle and Jaira Burns for the 2018 League of Legends World Championship, titled "Pop/Stars" (2018). Speaking about the track, Beer stated:

"The song’s production feels really new to me. It’s got a vibe in the beat like I haven’t heard before. I love Charli XCX, so getting to work with her was really inspiring. Offset felt like the perfect fit for the track. He’s one of the most talented, professional, down to Earth artists I’ve ever worked with, and his verse absolutely kills it."

— Madison Beer, Complex

== Composition ==
Musically, "Hurts Like Hell" is a dark pop song with a trap-influenced beat. It also contains a "pointed message" and a "bone-jarring chorus". Mike Nied, writing for Idolator, compared the song to Beer's previous single "Dead". Beer's vocals, which are distorted by synths in the song, were described by Billboard as "deep and soulful". Lyrically, it sees the singer dismissing a cheating ex, as she touts her success.

== Critical reception ==
Nicole Engleman of Billboard, called the song "fierce". She additionally praised Offset's verse in the song, stating his vocals "add texture" to the song. Mike Nied, writing for Idolator, also complimented Offset's verse, calling it "perfectly at home on the beat," while also stating "it is definitely possible to imagine the pair dominating radio in the coming weeks".

== Music video ==
A music video accompanied the release of "Hurts Like Hell". The witchcraft-inspired video sees the singer taking revenge on an abusive man. The singer later appears at his bedside with a knife, before a witch hunt begins that builds to the video's ending. Mike Wass of Idolator called the video "delightfully twisted".

== Track listing ==
Digital download

1. "Hurts Like Hell" – 3:27

Acoustic version

1. "Hurts Like Hell" (Acoustic Live) – 2:57

Feenixpawl Remix

1. "Hurts like Hell" (Feenixpawl Remix) – 3:43

== Charts ==
Chart performance for "Hurts Like Hell"
Chart (2018–2019)	Peak position
Australia Hitseekers (ARIA)	3
Austria (Ö3 Austria Top 40)	73
Belgium (Ultratip Bubbling Under Flanders)	–
Canada CHR/Top 40 (Billboard)	47
Ireland (IRMA)	84
New Zealand Hot Singles (RMNZ)	28
UK Independent (Official Charts)	31
US Mainstream Top 40 (Billboard)	26

== Certifications ==
Certifications for "Hurts Like Hell"
Region	Certification	Certified units/sales
Australia (ARIA)	Gold	35,000^{‡}
Canada (Music Canada)	Platinum	80,000^{‡}
New Zealand (RMNZ)	Gold	15,000^{‡}
United Kingdom (BPI)	Silver	200,000^{‡}
United States (RIAA)	Gold	500,000^{‡}
^{‡} Sales+streaming figures based on certification alone.
