= Home with You =

Home with You may refer to:

- "Home with You" (Madison Beer song), a 2018 song by Madison Beer
- "Home with You", a 2018 song by Liam Payne from the EP First Time
- "Home with You", a 2019 song by FKA Twigs from the album Magdalene
