= Locket (album) =

2026 studio album by Madison Beer

- Standard cover

Studio album by Madison Beer
- Released: January 16, 2026
- Genres: Pop; R&B
- Length: 33:31
- Labels: Epic; Sing It Loud
- Producers: Madison Beer; Leroy Clampitt; Jasper Harris; Lostboy; Tim "One Love" Sommers

Madison Beer chronology
Silence Between Songs (2023)	Locket (2026)

Singles from Locket
- 1. "Make You Mine" Released: February 9, 2024; 2. "Yes Baby" Released: September 19, 2025; 3. "Bittersweet" Released: October 10, 2025; 4. "Bad Enough" Released: January 16, 2026

Locket (stylized in all lowercase) is the third studio album by the American singer-songwriter Madison Beer. Released on January 16, 2026 through Epic Records and Sing It Loud, it serves as Beer's first studio release since her 2023 album, Silence Between Songs. The standard edition of the album was supported by four singles: "Make You Mine", "Yes Baby", "Bittersweet" and "Bad Enough". Musically, it has been described as a pop and R&B record with elements of dance-pop, dark pop, and electro.

Locket was met with positive critical reception and was a commercial success. It debuted within the top ten in Australia, Austria, Belgium, Germany, Ireland, the Netherlands, New Zealand, Poland, Scotland, Switzerland, and the United Kingdom. In the United States, the album debuted at number 10 on the Billboard 200 with 43,000 album equivalent units earned, becoming Beer's first top-ten album in her home country.

To promote the album, Beer embarked on the Locket Tour (2026) across North America and Europe, with supporting acts from Isabel LaRosa, Thủy, and Lulu Simon.

== Release and composition ==
Following her previous studio album, Silence Between Songs (2023), Beer announced the release date of her third studio album, Locket, on October 22, 2025, along with the album's artwork and pre-order information, including details about its physical formats, through her official website. About the album, she stated:

"After writing the album, it feels like each song lives within this metaphorical locket for safekeeping. Each album feels like an era and once the albums are out in the world, the chapter for me, usually with what I wrote about, is closed."

Musically, Locket has been described as a pop and R&B record with elements of dance-pop, dark pop, and electro.

The album's deluxe edition, featuring four additional tracks, was released on May 8, 2026.

== Promotion ==
=== Singles and music videos ===
The album's lead single, "Make You Mine," was released on February 9, 2024. It achieved critical and commercial success, reaching the top 40 in several territories and earning Beer a Grammy Award nomination for Best Dance Pop Recording, her second career nomination.

"Yes Baby" was released on September 19, 2025. According to Beer, the track was conceived as "the closing bracket in an unintentional trilogy," following the singles "Make You Mine" and "15 Minutes." A third single, "Bittersweet", was released on October 10, 2025, accompanied by a music video co-directed with Aerin Moreno, starring Sean Kaufman, which premiered on October 20, 2025. Alongside the album's release on January 16, Beer released the music video for the fourth single "Bad Enough". On May 8, the day of the deluxe edition's release, its track "Lovergirl" received a music video.

=== Performances ===
Beer was one of the musical performers at the Victoria's Secret Fashion Show 2025 on October 15, where she performed live the album's three singles "Make You Mine", "Bittersweet" and "Yes Baby". On January 13, 2026, Beer officially announced the Locket Tour, with 32 shows across Europe and North America.

== Critical reception ==
Professional ratings
Aggregate scores
Source	Rating
AnyDecentMusic?	6.7/10
Metacritic	72/100
Review scores
Source	Rating
AllMusic	3.5/5 stars
Clash	8/10
The Independent	4/5 stars
Paste	B−
PopMatters	7/10
Rolling Stone	3.5/5 stars
Pitchfork	6.0/10

According to the review aggregator Metacritic, Locket received "generally favorable reviews" based on a weighted average score of 72 out of 100 from 7 critic scores.

Melvin Boateng of Clash described the album as an intimate and self-assured body of work shaped by memory and emotional reflection, praising its confidence, focus, and strong authorship that moves beyond expectations. Writing for Paste, Lydia Wei noted the record's blend of dark synth-pop, 1990s R&B influences, and experimental electronic textures, calling it Beer's most focused and enjoyable project to date.

== Track listing ==
Locket track listing
No.	Title	Writer(s)	Producer(s)	Length
1.	"Locket Theme"	Madison Beer; Leroy Clampitt; Matt Maltese	Beer; Clampitt	1:28
2.	"Yes Baby"	Beer; Clampitt; Peter Rycroft; Lucy Healey	Beer; Clampitt^{[p]}; Lostboy^{[p]}; Healey^{[v]}	2:55
3.	"Angel Wings"	Beer; Clampitt; Jeremy "Kinetics" Dussolliet; Tim "One Love" Sommers	Beer; Clampitt; Sommers	4:04
4.	"For the Night"	Beer; Clampitt; Healey	Beer; Clampitt^{[p]}; Healey^{[p]}	3:08
5.	"Bad Enough"	Beer; Clampitt; Healey	Beer; Clampitt^{[p]}; Healey^{[a]}^{[v]}	3:42
6.	"Healthy Habit"	Beer; Jasper Harris; Healey	Beer; Clampitt^{[p]}; Harris; Healey^{[p]}	1:56
7.	"You're Still Everything"	Beer; Clampitt; Healey	Beer; Clampitt^{[p]}; Healey^{[a]}^{[v]}	3:29
8.	"Bittersweet"	Beer; Sommers; Madi Yanofsky; Jon Robert Hall	Beer; Sommers	3:22
9.	"Complexity"	Beer; Clampitt; Rycroft; Healey	Beer; Clampitt^{[p]}; Lostboy^{[p]}; Healey^{[v]}	2:37
10.	"Make You Mine"	Beer; Clampitt	Beer^{[p]}; Clampitt^{[p]}	3:41
11.	"Nothing at All"	Beer; Clampitt; Rycroft; Healey	Beer; Clampitt^{[p]}; Lostboy	3:08
Total length:				33:30

Target CD and digital special edition bonus tracks
No.	Title	Writer(s)	Length
12.	"Bad Enough" (acoustic)	Beer; Clampitt; Healey	3:43
13.	"Bittersweet" (acoustic)	Beer; Sommers; Yanofsky; Hall	3:46
Total length:			41:04

Deluxe edition bonus tracks
No.	Title	Writer(s)	Producer(s)	Length
12.	"Lovergirl"	Beer; Clampitt; Rycroft; Healey	Beer; Clampitt^{[p]}; Lostboy^{[p]}; Healey^{[v]}	3:21
13.	"Free"	Beer; Sommers; Dussolliet; Donna Missal	Sommers	3:34
14.	"Somehow I Got Lucky"	Beer; Healey	Clampitt; Healey^{[p]}	2:07
15.	"Locket Theme" (extended)	Beer; Clampitt; Maltese	Beer; Clampitt^{[p]}	2:40
Total length:				44:37

=== Notes ===
- ^{^[p]} denotes a primary and vocal producer.
- ^{^[a]} denotes an additional producer.
- ^{^[v]} denotes a vocal producer.
- "Healthy Habit" contains an excerpt from the animated series Adventure Time.
- "Complexity" contains an interpolation of the bell sound from the television series Severance.
- All song titles are stylized in lowercase.

== Personnel ==
Credits were adapted from the album's liner notes and Tidal. Track numbers refer to the digital deluxe edition of the album.

- Madison Beer – lead vocals (all tracks), background vocals (tracks 1–11, 13, 15), vocal arrangement (tracks 3, 8); keyboards, programming (10); creative direction, executive production
- Mitch McCarthy – mixing
- Nathan Dantzler – mastering
- Leroy Clampitt – programming (1–4, 10, 14, 15), engineering (1, 2, 4–7, 9–11, 14, 15), bass (1, 2, 4, 7, 9, 10, 12), synthesizers (1, 3, 12, 15), strings arrangement (1, 9, 11, 15), background vocals (1), drums (2–4, 9, 10, 12, 15), vocal arrangement (2, 4, 5), guitars (4, 7, 10), lap steel (4, 7, 12), keyboards (5–7, 9–11), drum programming (5–7), percussion (10), synthesizer programming (14)
- Yi-Mei Templeman – cello (1, 9, 11, 14, 15), strings arrangement (1, 11, 15)
- Matt Maltese – piano (1, 15)
- Peter Rycroft – drums (2, 9, 11, 12), bass (2, 9, 11); keyboards, programming (2); engineering, bass synthesizer, synthesizers (12)
- Lucy Healey – background vocals (2, 4–7, 9, 14), vocal arrangement (2, 4, 5), piano (4), bass (5, 6), keyboards (5, 7); engineering, synthesizer programming (14)
- Tim Sommers – drums, synthesizers, background vocals, engineering (3, 8, 13); keyboards, vocal arrangement (3, 8); bass, programming (3, 13); guitar (8), piano (13)
- Naebird – engineering assistance (3, 8, 13); strings, brass (8)
- Ben Barter – live drums (5)
- Jasper Harris – drum programming, bass, keyboards (6)
- Jon Robert Hall – vocal arrangement (8)
- Donna Missal – background vocals (13)
- Aerin Moreno – creative direction
- Tina Ibañez – creative direction, art direction, design
- Nick D'Apolito – art direction, design
- Maximilian Sholl – release planning and production

== Charts ==
Chart performance for Locket
Chart (2026)	Peak position
Australian Albums (ARIA)	3
Austrian Albums (Ö3 Austria)	6
Belgian Albums (Ultratop Flanders)	1
Belgian Albums (Ultratop Wallonia)	3
Canadian Albums (Billboard)	12
Dutch Albums (Album Top 100)	2
French Albums (SNEP)	29
German Albums (Offizielle Top 100)	8
German Pop Albums (Offizielle Top 100)	4
Hungarian Albums (MAHASZ)	21
Irish Albums (Official Charts)	7
Italian Albums (FIMI)	67
Lithuanian Albums (AGATA)	34
New Zealand Albums (RMNZ)	8
Norwegian Albums (IFPI Norge)	52
Polish Albums (ZPAV)	6
Portuguese Albums (AFP)	7
Scottish Albums (Official Charts)	3
Spanish Albums (Promusicae)	20
Swiss Albums (Schweizer Hitparade)	8
UK Albums (Official Charts)	3
US Billboard 200	10

== Release history ==
Release history
Region	Date	Format(s)	Label	Ref.
Various	January 16, 2026	Cassette; CD; digital download; LP	Epic; Sing It Loud	
