= Yes Baby =

2025 single by Madison Beer

Single by Madison Beer

from the album Locket
- Released: September 19, 2025
- Genre: Electropop; dance-pop; synth-pop
- Length: 2:55
- Label: Epic; Sing It Loud
- Songwriters: Madison Beer; Leroy Clampitt; Peter Rycroft; Lucy Healey
- Producers: Madison Beer; Leroy Clampitt; Peter Rycroft

Madison Beer singles chronology
"15 Minutes" (2024)	"Yes Baby" (2025)	"Bittersweet" (2025)

Music video
- "Yes Baby" on YouTube

"Yes Baby" is a song by the American singer Madison Beer. She co-wrote it alongside Leroy Clampitt, Peter Rycroft, and Lucy Healey, and co-produced it with the former two. It was released on September 19, 2025, through Epic Records and Sing It Loud as the second single from her third album, Locket (2026). The song was accompanied by a music video directed by Beer and Aerin Moreno.

== Release ==
Madison Beer first teased the release of "Yes Baby" on social media on September 15, 2025, sharing a short clip of her walking on a treadmill, wearing black heels and white socks. Two days later, she officially announced the single and revealed its cover artwork, featuring a picture of the aforementioned clip. Epic Records and Sing It Loud released "Yes Baby" on September 19, 2025. A music video, directed by Beer and Aerin Moreno, premiered on the same date. The video was inspired by 1980s exercise clips, and features the singer using exercise balls, a barre, and dancing in a mirrored choreography. According to Rolling Stone's Jon Blistein, a press release for "Yes Baby" suggested that it served as the first single from Beer's upcoming album.

== Composition ==
Beer co-wrote "Yes Baby" with Leroy Clampitt, Peter Rycroft, and Lucy Healey, and co-produced alongside the former two. According to music publications, "Yes Baby" is an electropop, dance-pop, and synth-pop track with instrumental led by synthesizers and "propulsive" percussion. Beer described it as "really just a fun and flirty song", and stated that it incorporated "a whole new energy" after recording the music video. In the chorus, Beer repeats the song's title: "Yes, baby, yes, yes, baby, yes, yes, baby". In an interview with Paper, Beer declared that the title phrase has a sexual meaning, and conceived the song as "the closing bracket in an unintentional trilogy", following her 2024 singles "Make You Mine" and "15 Minutes".

== Personnel ==
The personnel is adapted from Tidal.

- Madison Beer – vocals, songwriter, producer
- Leroy Clampitt – programming, bass, keyboards, drums, songwriter, producer, recording engineer, vocal producer
- Peter Rycroft (Lostboy) – programming, bass, keyboards, drums, songwriter, producer, vocal producer
- Lucy Healey – background vocals, songwriter, vocal producer
- Mitch McCarthy – mixing engineer
- Nathan Dantzler – mastering engineer

== Charts ==
Chart performance for "Yes Baby"
Chart (2025)	Peak position
Ireland (IRMA)	99
Lithuania Airplay (TopHit)	75
New Zealand Hot Singles (RMNZ)	11
UK Singles Sales (OCC)	63
US Dance Digital Song Sales (Billboard)	8
US Dance/Mix Show Airplay (Billboard)	1
US Hot Dance/Pop Songs (Billboard)	11
