= Selfish (Madison Beer song) =

- Alan Walker remix cover

Single by Madison Beer

from the album Life Support
- Released: February 14, 2020
- Genre: Pop
- Length: 3:43
- Label: Epic; Access
- Songwriters: Madison Beer; Elizabeth Lowell Boland; Jaramye Daniels; Jeremy Dussolliet; Leroy Clampitt; Tim Sommers
- Producers: Madison Beer; Leroy Clampitt

Madison Beer singles chronology
"Good in Goodbye" (2020)	"Selfish" (2020)	"Baby" (2020)

Music video
- "Selfish" on YouTube

"Selfish" is a song by American singer Madison Beer. It was released on February 14, 2020 as the second single from her debut studio album Life Support (2021). Beer co-wrote and produced the song with Leroy Clampitt, while other credited writers of the song include Jeremy Dussolliet, Tim Sommers, Lowell, and Jaramye Daniels. Commercially, "Selfish" reached number 25 in Ireland, making it her first top forty hit as a solo artist in the country.

== Composition ==
"Selfish" is a slow tempo pop ballad with stripped-down production. The song was written by Madison Beer, Leroy Clampitt, Jaramye Daniels, Jeremy Dussolliet, Elizabeth Lowell Boland, and Tim Sommers. Beer and Clampitt handled production of the song. In terms of music notation, "Selfish" was composed using 4/4 common time in the key of A major with a slow tempo of 75 beats per minute. Beer's alto vocal range spans from the low note of F#_{3} to the high note of E_{5}. For much of the song, the stripped-down instrumentation consists of an electric guitar, placing emphasis on Beer's vocals, which are doubled in select parts of the song such as the chorus. Beer's vocal performance on the track was described by one music critic as "emotional". Deemed a "breakup ballad" by one music critic, "Selfish" contains lyrics about a toxic relationship and feelings of betrayal.

== Critical reception ==
"Selfish" received universal acclaim. Billboard magazine praised Beer's vocal performance on the song, writing that the singer "sounds poised [on "Selfish"], committed to the approach and confident in her capabilities as a vocalist". Brian Cantor, writing for Headline Planet, praised the song as an "impressive vocal showing" and "perhaps the strongest 'mainstream pop' song to hit the market thus far in 2020". Mike Wass of Idolator deemed the song a "stirring breakup ballad".

== Music video ==
"Selfish" was accompanied by a music video co-directed by Madison Beer and Jason Lester that was released the same day as the single. The visual features the singer performing the song on the ground with various rain effects. After its upload, the video currently has over 53 million views as well as more than 1 million likes.

On December 15, 2020, a Vevo LIFT live performance of "Selfish" was released on Beer's YouTube account. The video features the artist lying down on an illuminated platform, she progresses throughout the song with more powerful runs that weren't originally present in the track.

== Personnel ==
Adapted from Tidal.

- Madison Beer – lead artist, songwriter, producer
- Leroy Clampitt – songwriter, producer, bass, drums, keyboards, programmer, recording engineer
- Jaramye Daniels – songwriter
- Jeremy Dussolliet – songwriter
- Elizabeth Lowell Boland – songwriter
- Tim Sommers – songwriter
- Kinga Bacik – cello
- Oscar Scivier – executive producer
- Chris Gehringer – mastering engineer
- Mitch McCarthy – mixing engineer

== Charts ==
Chart (2020)	Peak position
Australia (ARIA)	54
Canada Hot 100 (Billboard)	72
Greece International Digital (IFPI)	65
Ireland (IRMA)	25
Lithuania (AGATA)	62
Netherlands (Single Tip)	14
New Zealand Hot Singles (RMNZ)	16
Portugal (AFP)	155
Sweden Heatseeker (Sverigetopplistan)	18
UK Singles (OCC)	53
US Bubbling Under Hot 100 (Billboard)	19

== Certifications ==
Region	Certification	Certified units/sales
Brazil (Pro-Música Brasil)	Platinum	40,000^{‡}
Canada (Music Canada)	Platinum	80,000^{‡}
New Zealand (RMNZ)	Platinum	30,000^{‡}
United Kingdom (BPI)	Silver	200,000^{‡}
United States (RIAA)	Platinum	1,000,000^{‡}
^{‡} Sales+streaming figures based on certification alone.

== Release history ==
Region	Date	Format	Label(s)	Ref.
Various	February 14, 2020	Digital download; streaming	Access; Epic; Sony	
