= As She Pleases =

EP by Madison Beer
- Released: February 2, 2018
- Recorded: 2016–2017
- Genre: R&B
- Length: 21:30
- Label: Access
- Producer: Michael Keenan; Fred Ball; One Love; The Monsters and the Strangerz; German; Big Taste

Madison Beer chronology
As She Pleases (2018)	Life Support (2021)

Singles from As She Pleases
- 1. "Dead" Released: May 19, 2017; 2. "Say It to My Face" Released: November 3, 2017; 3. "Home with You" Released: March 10, 2018

As She Pleases is the debut extended play by American singer-songwriter Madison Beer. It was released on February 2, 2018 by Access. The EP was supported by the release of three singles; "Dead", "Say It to My Face" and "Home with You". It debuted and peaked at number 93 on the Billboard 200, and reached top 10 of the US Independent Albums chart.

== Singles ==
The EP's lead single "Dead" was released alongside its lyric video on May 19, 2017. The music video of the track was released on August 3, 2017. Remixes from Cedric Gervais and Laibert, as well as an acoustic version, were released to promote the track.

The second single, "Say It to My Face", was released on November 3, 2017. On November 15, the music video was released. A remix version of the song by The Wideboys were released on December 15, 2017.

"Home with You" was released as the third and final single on February 2, 2018. Its music video was released on June 14, 2018.

== Track listing ==
No.	Title	Writer(s)	Producer(s)	Length
1.	"Dead"	Brittany Amaradio; Madison Love; Michael Keenan	Keenan	3:14
2.	"Fools"	Beer; Jeremy Dussolliet; Timothy Sommers	One Love	3:38
3.	"HeartLess"	Beer; Amaradio; Jordan Johnson; Love; Marcus Lomax; Oliver Peterhof; Stefan Johnson	The Monsters and the Strangerz; German	2:38
4.	"Tyler Durden"	Beer; Dussolliet; Sommers	One Love	2:07
5.	"Home with You"	Janée Bennett; Leroy Clampitt; Rachel Keen	Big Taste	3:10
6.	"Teenager in Love"	Beer; Dussolliet; Sommers	One Love	3:34
7.	"Say It to My Face"	Dayyon Alexander; Fred Ball; Beer; Sarah Aarons	Ball	3:09
Total length:				21:30

== Charts ==
Chart (2018)	Peak position
Australian Albums (ARIA)	64
Austrian Albums (Ö3 Austria)	68
Canadian Albums (Billboard)	62
France Downloads Albums (SNEP)	27
Irish Albums (IRMA)	38
New Zealand Heatseeker Albums (RMNZ)	3
Scottish Albums (OCC)	91
Swiss Albums (Schweizer Hitparade)	68
UK Download Albums (OCC)	16
US Billboard 200	93
US Independent Albums (Billboard)	8

== Certifications ==
Certifications for As She Pleases
Region	Certification	Certified units/sales
New Zealand (RMNZ)	Gold	7,500^{‡}
^{‡} Sales+streaming figures based on certification alone.

== Tour ==
As She Pleases Tour
- Tour by Madison Beer
- Associated album: As She Pleases
- Start date: March 11, 2018
- End date: May 20, 2018
- Legs: 2
- No. of shows: 15 in Europe; 14 in North America; 29 in total

Madison Beer concert chronology
- As She Pleases Tour (2018); The Life Support Tour (2021–2022)

On January 28, 2018, Beer announced via Instagram she would be headlining her first tour, the "As She Pleases Tour". Late in the day, she revealed that the first leg would be in Europe. On February 5, 2018, she announced the second leg of her tour via Twitter, in North America. Graeme Virtue of The Guardian rated the tour 4 out of 5 stars and praised Beer's "somersaulting" voice.

=== Setlist ===
The following setlist was obtained from the April 2, 2018 concert, In Amsterdam, Netherlands. It does not represent all concerts for the duration of the tour.

1. "Teenager in Love"
2. "Fools"
3. "Say It to My Face"
4. "Can't Help Falling in Love" (Elvis Presley cover)
5. "Melodies" / "Unbreakable"
6. "Something Sweet"
7. "All for Love"
8. "Video Games" (Lana Del Rey cover)
9. "Tyler Durden"
10. "Jealous" (Labrinth cover)
11. "Creep (Radiohead cover)
12. "Heartless"
13. "Home with You"

Encore

14. "Dead"

=== Shows ===
List of concerts, showing date, city, country and venue
Date	City	Country	Venue
Europe
March 11	Milan	Italy	Dude Club
March 13	Berlin	Germany	Bi Nuu
March 14	Frankfurt	Germany	Zoom
March 16	Hamburg	Germany	Indra Club
March 17	Cologne	Germany	LUXOR
March 19	Brussels	Belgium	Botanique The Rotonde
March 20	Paris	France	Les Étoiles Theatre
March 22	Glasgow	England	ABC2
March 24	Manchester	England	Club Academy
March 25	London	England	O2 Academy Islington
March 27	Birmingham	England	O2 Institute 3
March 28	Nottingham	England	The Bodega Club
March 30	Belfast	Northern Ireland	Oh Yeah Music Centre
March 31	Dublin	Ireland	Academy Green Room
April 2	Amsterdam	Netherlands	Bitterzoet
North America
April 26	Los Angeles	United States	Belasco Theatre
April 27	San Diego	United States	House of Blues
April 29	Phoenix	United States	Crescent Ballroom
May 1	Denver	United States	Summit Music Hall
May 4	Austin	United States	Parish
May 7	St. Louis	United States	Delmar Hall
May 8	Chicago	United States	Bottom Lounge
May 10	Cleveland	United States	Cambridge Room
May 12	Detroit	United States	Saint Andrews
May 13	Toronto	Canada	Velvet Underground
May 15	Boston	United States	Paradise Rock Club
May 16	Philadelphia	United States	The Foundry at the Fillmore
May 17	New York	United States	Gramercy Theatre
May 19	Huntington	United States	The Paramount
May 20	Washington, D.C.	United States	Union Stage
