= Madison Beer =

American singer-songwriter (born 1999)

- Beer in 2026
- Born: Madison Elle Beer; March 5, 1999 (age 27); Jericho, New York, U.S.
- Occupations: Singer-songwriter; television personality
- Years active: 2012–present
- Works: Discography
- Partner: Justin Herbert (eng. 2026)
- Awards: Full list
- Musical career
- Genres: Pop; EDM; R&B
- Labels: Schoolboy; IDJ; Island; First Access; Epic; Sing It Loud
- Member of: K/DA
- Website: madisonbeer.com

Madison Elle Beer (born March 5, 1999) is an American singer-songwriter and television personality. Beer first gained media attention after Justin Bieber posted a link to her cover of "At Last" in 2012, when she was 13 years old. In 2018, she released her debut extended play (EP), As She Pleases.

Beer signed with Epic Records in August 2019 and released her debut studio album, Life Support (2021), which included the RIAA Platinum certified single "Selfish". This was followed by her second studio album, Silence Between Songs (2023), which received a nomination for the Grammy Award for Best Immersive Audio Album. Beer's third studio album Locket (2026) included the singles "Make You Mine", which was nominated for the Grammy Award for Best Dance Pop Recording and "Bittersweet", which marked her first appearance on the US Billboard Hot 100, reaching number 68.

Beer also voiced the virtual character Evelynn in the League of Legends virtual band K/DA, with whom she has released the singles "Pop/Stars" (2018) and "More" (2020). She has also appeared on television series such as Todrick (2015) and RuPaul's Drag Race (2020), and in the film Louder Than Words (2013).

== Early life ==
Beer was born on March 5, 1999, in Jericho, New York, on Long Island. Her father, Robert Beer, is the founder of Built By Beer, a luxury home builder, and her mother, Tracie, worked as an interior designer and invented the contour hanger. They got divorced in 2006, when Madison was 7 years old, but they still maintained a relationship. She has a brother, Ryder, who is 3 years younger. Her maternal grandfather, Marty, came out as gay later in life and was a major inspiration to her. He married a woman and had 3 children trying to live life as a straight man due to societal pressures. Her family is part Ashkenazi Jewish and part Moroccan Jewish.

Beer was named "Madison" after the Daryl Hannah character in her mother's favorite movie, Splash (1984). Beer appeared on the cover of Child magazine after winning a modeling competition at four years old.

Beer said that she knew she wanted to be either a singer or a musician since she was in kindergarten. She began taking singing lessons at age 8 and performed in after-school plays. Her first solo performance was at Arthur Ashe Kids' Day at the US Open when she was barely 13 years old. Her first celebrity crush was David Archuleta. Her father is a huge fan of the Grateful Dead and she also listened to The Rolling Stones and Nirvana growing up. Beer was a competitive gymnast for 6 years as a child but stopped the sport after a neck sprain.

When she was around 6 or 7 years old, she was sexually abused by someone who was around her frequently, whom she has not named. In her summers, she attended Point O’Pines sleep away summer camp in upstate New York. She celebrated her bat mitzvah in 2012. When she was 13, Beer moved from Long Island to Los Angeles, with her mother, to pursue her music career. She was homeschooled from grade 7 to grade 12. Beer attended Jericho Middle School and Jericho High School in the Jericho Union Free School District.

Beer was childhood friends with Hailey Bieber and Selena Gomez.

== Career ==
=== 2012–2018: Career beginnings and As She Pleases ===
In early 2012, Beer began posting her cover versions of popular songs on YouTube. In May 2012, Beer's mom shared a cover version of Beer singing "At Last" by Etta James on her Facebook page. One of her Facebook friends watched the video and sent it to Scooter Braun, who forwarded it to Justin Bieber. In July 2012, Bieber shared a link to the video to his 25 million followers on Twitter with the text "wow. 13 years old! she can sing. great job. #futurestar -". Beer, a huge Bieber fan, said she was "hysterically crying, not really knowing what to do with myself". Beer then trended on Twitter and gained substantial media coverage. Beer met Bieber, which she said "was the happiest day of my life", and Bieber signed Beer personally to the record label to which he is signed, Island Records. She was also signed to a talent management agreement with Bieber's manager Scooter Braun. She said she did not see any of the money from the initial record label signing since her parents wanted her to "be a normal kid". However, she did buy herself her first Rolex after one of her first big deals.

Beer partnered with Mattel's Monster High, and recorded a theme song for the franchise titled "We Are Monster High", released in June 2013. In February 2013, Cody Simpson re-released his song "Valentine" with Beer. In September 2013, Beer released her debut single and music video called "Melodies" which was written by Peter Kelleher, Ben Kohn, Thomas Barnes and Ina Wroldsen. The music video featured a guest appearance by Justin Bieber, which boosted Beer's career further. By 2013, Beer bagan work on her debut album, which was slated to have pop and R&B influences. However, she disagreed with her label's "Disney"-style plans for her music; the album was later scrapped. These disagreements led Beer to leave her label and become an unsigned artist; the breakup was finalized in 2016.

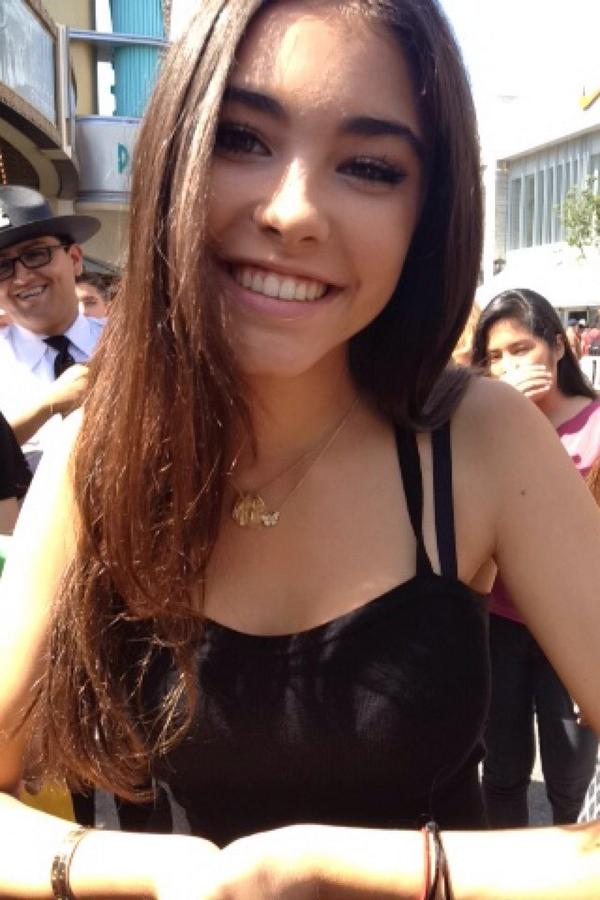
Beer in September 2014

Her second single, "Unbreakable", was released in June 2014, and was written by Jessica Ashley, Evan Bogart, Heather Jeanette Miley, Matt Schwartz, Emanuel Kiriakou and Andrew Goldstein and was produced by the latter two.

Beer was featured in "I Won't Let You Walk Away" by Mako, released in February 2015. The song reached number 43 on the Hot Dance/Electronic Songs, number 33 on the Dance/Electronic Digital Songs, and number 19 on the Dance/Mix Show Airplay charts in the United States. In September 2015, Beer released "All For Love" featuring Jack & Jack.

In February 2017, Beer walked the runway for Dolce & Gabbana Fall 2017 show at Milan Fashion Week. "Dead" was released in May 2017; the music video was released in August 2017. Beer released "Say It to My Face", including the music video, in November 2017.

As She Pleases, an EP recorded over a three-year period, was released in February 2018. In March 2018, "Home with You" was released. In August 2018, the song peaked at number 21 on the Billboard Mainstream Top 40 chart, making her the only unsigned female solo artist on the charts. Beer made her festival debut at Lollapalooza in August 2018, in Chicago. Beer was featured on "Blame It On Love", a song from David Guetta's seventh studio album 7, released in September 2018. Riot Games released a song and music video for "Pop/Stars" in November 2018. The song is performed by Beer, Miyeon, and Soyeon from (G)I-DLE and Jaira Burns under a virtual K-pop group named K/DA. This song was used as a theme song for the League of Legends. Also in November 2018, Beer released "Hurts Like Hell" featuring Offset.

=== 2019–2023: Life Support and Silence Between Songs ===
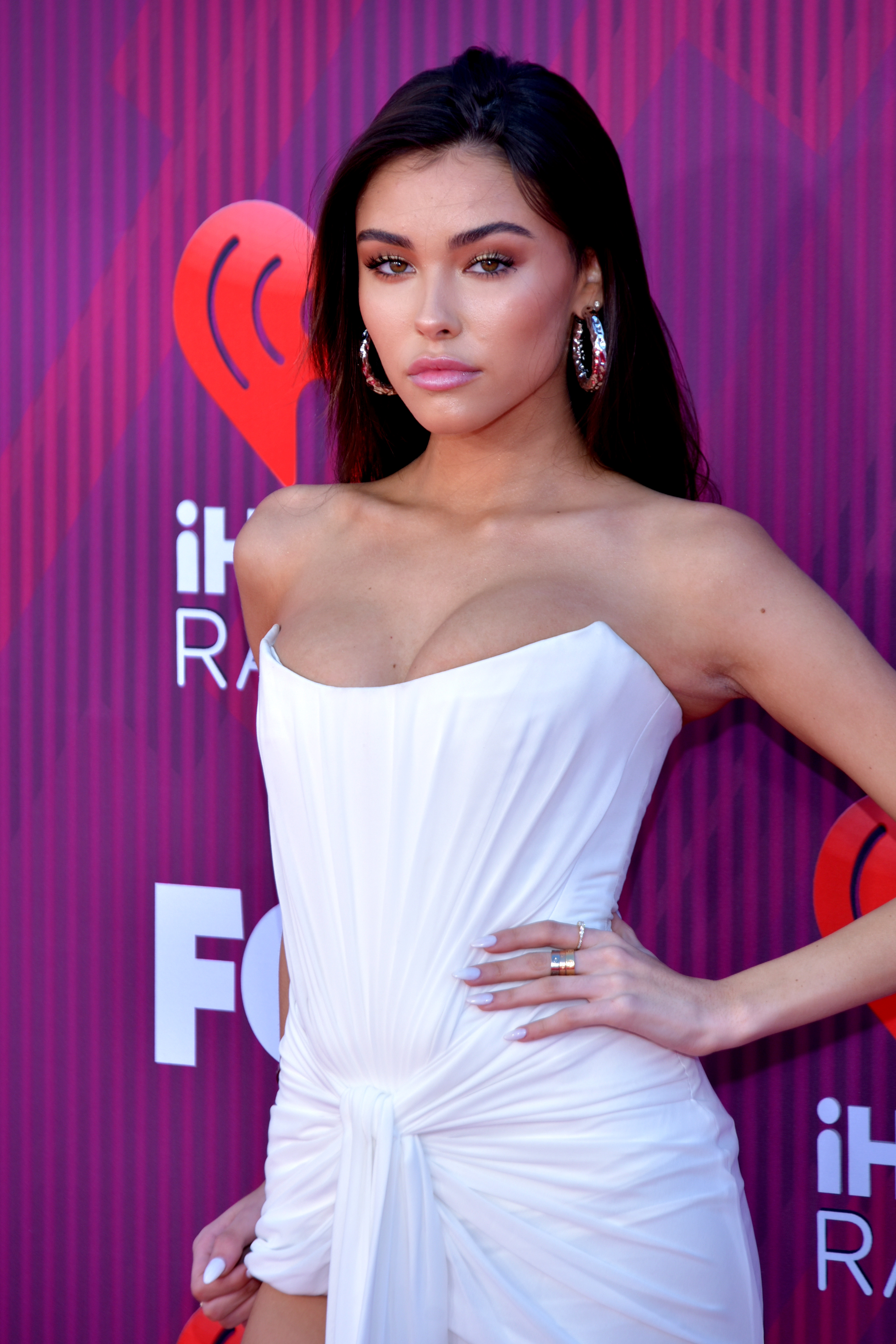
Beer at the iHeartRadio Music Awards in 2019

Beer was featured on "All Day and Night", released in March 2019, by DJs Jax Jones and Martin Solveig under their alias "Europa". In May 2019, Beer released the single "Dear Society". In August 2019, Beer signed with Epic Records.

In January 2020, she released "Good in Goodbye" as the lead single from her debut studio album, Life Support. This was followed by its second single "Selfish" – which reached number 19 on the US Bubbling Under Hot 100 chart. It was certified Platinum by the RIAA in the United States. She also released the promotional single "Stained Glass"; Beer co-directed the music video. She released the third single from the album, "Baby", in August 2020. In October 2020, she reprised her role in K/DA as Evelynn and was featured on two tracks for the EP All Out: "More" along with the original lineup and Lexie Liu, and "Villain" which also features German singer Kim Petras. The fourth single from Life Support, "Boyshit", was released in December 2020.

Beer was announced as Vevo's new LIFT artist in December 2020 and released live performances for "Selfish" and "Boyshit". A short film for the campaign titled Dreams Look Different in the Distance was released in January 2021. Life Support was released in February 2021, which Beer co-wrote entirely and mostly co-produced. Dani Blum of Pitchfork called it "ambitious yet shallow, seemingly intent on proving its own seriousness". NME's Hannah Mylrea gave it 4/5 stars. Mike DeWald of Riff Magazine gave the album an 8/10. The album debuted at number 65 on the US Billboard 200, and also peaked in the top 30 on both the Canadian Albums Chart and the UK Albums Chart.

In May 2021, Beer announced a North American tour, titled The Life Support Tour, in support of her album; the following month she extended it to a European leg. In June 2021, Beer released the song "Reckless". The song was met with critical acclaim for its lyrical content and vulnerability, and peaked in the top 40 on the Billboard US Mainstream Top 40. In November 2021, Beer released her first soundtrack song, "Room for You", as part of the soundtrack to Clifford the Big Red Dog, which was released later that month.

In July 2022, Beer made a cameo appearance along with various Internet celebrities in the music video for "Dolls", from Bella Poarch's debut EP of the same name. In July 2022, Beer released the song, "I Have Never Felt More Alive" which was used in the film Fall.

In August 2023, Beer released "Dangerous". Her second studio album, Silence Between Songs, was released in September 2023, In October, she released "Showed Me (How I Fell In Love With You)", a cover version and variation of "You Showed Me". She also embarked on a European and North American tour titled The Spinnin Tour in support of the album. The album received a Grammy Award nomination for Best Immersive Audio Album at the 66th Annual Grammy Awards. In February 2023, Beer announced her memoir The Half of It: A Memoir, which was published by HarperCollins in April 2023.

=== 2024–present: Locket ===
In February 2024, Beer released the single "Make You Mine" which topped the US Dance/Mix Show Airplay chart, peaked at number 10 on the US Pop Airplay chart, and received a nomination for Best Dance Pop Recording at the 67th Annual Grammy Awards. This was followed by the standalone single "15 Minutes", released in July 2024.

In June 2025, Beer was featured on the soundtrack album to the film F1 (2025), on a song titled "All at Once". In September, Beer released the single "Yes Baby", and called it the "closing bracket in an unintentional trilogy" following "Make You Mine" and "15 Minutes". In October 2025, she released the single "Bittersweet" which debuted at number 98 and peaked at number 68 on the Billboard Hot 100 marking her first entry on the chart. That month, she performed at the Victoria's Secret Fashion Show 2025.

Beer performed on Dick Clark's New Year's Rockin' Eve on New Year's Eve 2026. Beer released her third studio album, Locket, in January 2026. She embarked on The Locket Tour in support of the album in May 2026.

== Artistry and influences ==
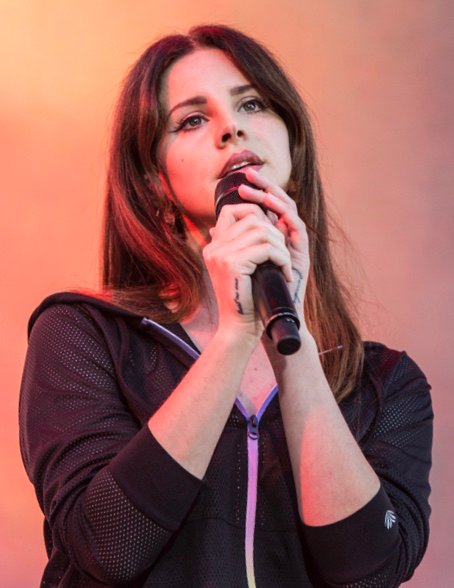
Beer's major influences include Ariana Grande (left) and Lana Del Rey (right).

Beer is mainly a pop, EDM, and R&B singer. She has experimented with alternative rock, Indie pop, dream pop, dark pop, hip hop, and dance. Additionally, she is influenced by psychedelic music. She has also described her music having a "retro feel" to it as well.

Beer has stated that she is "completely and utterly obsessed" with Arctic Monkeys. She runs an unnamed fan account for Rihanna. Also among her favorite artists are Lana Del Rey, Daft Punk, Melanie Martinez, Lady Gaga, and Ariana Grande. When questioned if she was inspired by Grande, Beer responded "I mean, you know Ariana's been one of my favorite people ever for like, so much of my career and like, even just prior to my career, so I'm sure she's definitely influenced me, a lot. ... But, I hate this narrative that's being pushed about me and her, you know, that it's kinda like this competition thing, like this is someone I idolize and someone I look up to."

Beer has also cited the Beatles, the Beach Boys, and the Bee Gees as some of her favorite music, saying that for her, “[The 1960s] were the best years for music… I think it was a different time, people were more eager to be themselves and experiment, and it was such a cool coming of age time for music.”

== Personal life ==
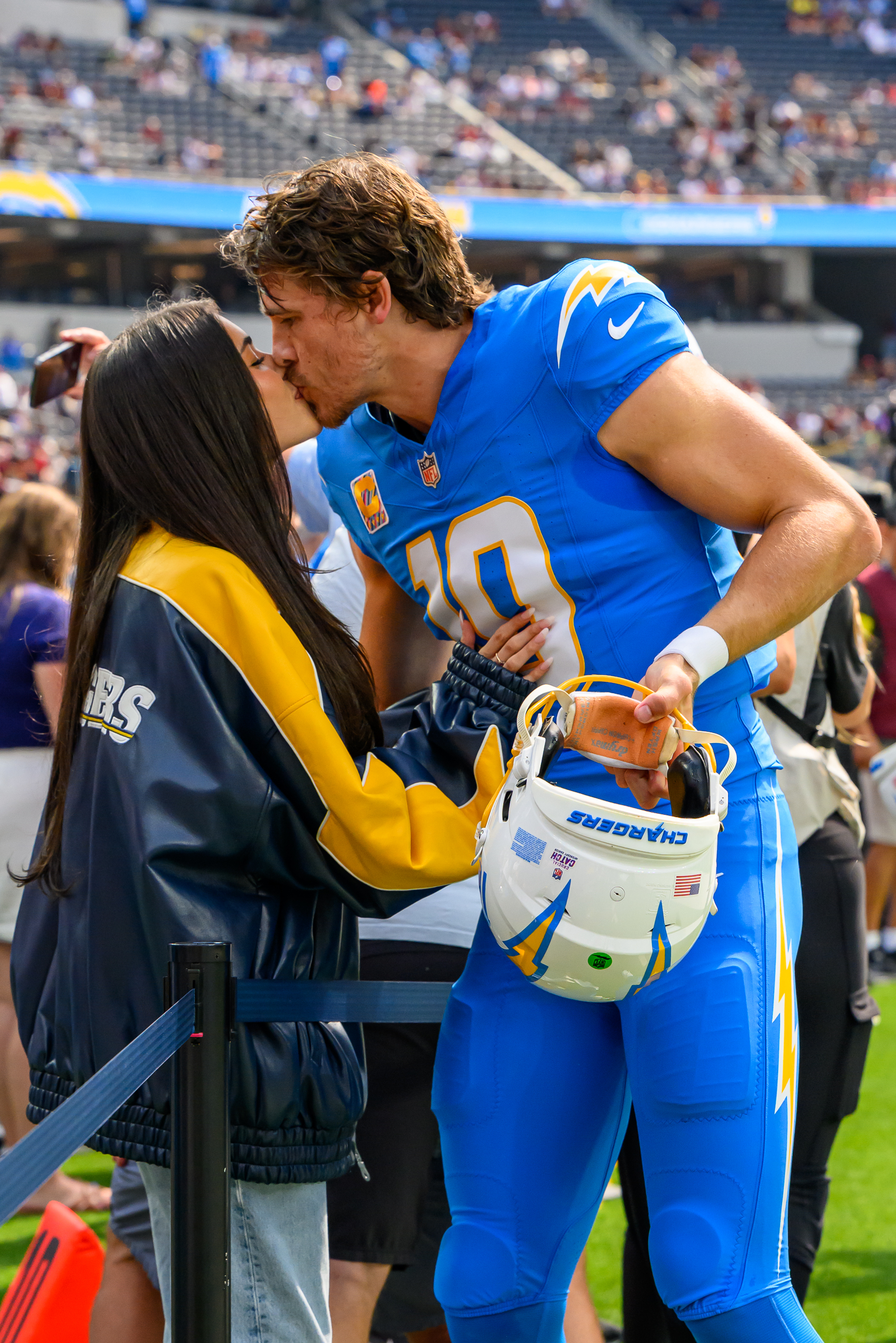
Beer with fiancé and NFL player Justin Herbert, 2025

In 2016, Beer discussed her sexuality in a YouNow chat, stating, "I'm not a lesbian, but I definitely love girls," and said that she has been in love with a woman in the past. In March 2020, she noted that she "came out, like, four years, three years ago", adding that "I am bi, always have been; it's nothing new". She also said "I've never understood homophobic people because I'm just like, 'Why are you affected by someone else's sexual preference?'"

In November 2020, Beer bought a newly-built 5-bedroom 6,484 square-foot house in Encino, Los Angeles, for $5.6 million. She sold it for $7 million in May 2022. In September 2022, Beer purchased a 4,434-square-foot Mediterranean-style villa in Hollywood Hills from Ashley Tisdale for $5.885 million.

Beer was in relationships with Jack Gilinsky of Jack & Jack from 2015 to 2017, Brooklyn Beckham in 2017, and Zack Bia from late 2017 to early 2019. Beer was in an on-and-off relationship with Internet celebrity Nick Austin in the summer 2020 to May 2025. Beer started dating Los Angeles Chargers quarterback Justin Herbert in August 2025. They announced their engagement on July 28, 2026.

Beer is an avid player of Fortnite. Her songs are featured as in-game emotes and Jam Tracks. She also appeared in a launch campaign for Lego Fortnite, including LEGO Fortnite Odyssey and Brick Life. In February 2026, during an appearance on Hot Ones, she stated that although she loves the game, she felt it had "changed too much" from its earlier seasons and urged developer Epic Games to keep aspects of its original formula, while also jokingly asking for her own in-game character skin. Epic Games acknowledged her requests, including for a collaboration.

=== Health ===
At age 7, Beer was diagnosed with anxiety disorder. When she was 15, nude videos she sent to her boyfriend were leaked online. The incident, which she says reminded her of the sexual abuse she experienced as a child, contributed to her developing post-traumatic stress disorder (PTSD) and attempting suicide twice. She has stated that the videos were leaked over a period of years as an attempt to blackmail her, and that it took a significant amount of time to begin to recover: “I didn’t realise until years later that I was the victim”. In 2019, after seeing 6 psychiatrists, one of whom misdiagnosed her with schizophrenia and gave her anti-psychotic sedatives that turned her into a "zombie", she was diagnosed with borderline personality disorder (BPD).

Beer has struggled with mental health issues and stated that her issues have been worsened by social media and the internet. She found that she constantly needed to "self-validate" and needed to be complimented by others. She had lip filler but had it dissolved, which was also the topic of many social media posts. She struggled as a child star, once being told "We can’t have you in anything remotely revealing because you’re already so hot and you’re only 13".

When she was 16, she tried marijuana for the first time and was scared a video would leak and hurt her career. Beer does not drink alcohol.

=== Political views ===
Beer has supported the Black Lives Matter movement. She endorsed Joe Biden in the 2020 United States presidential election. Regarding the Israeli–Palestinian conflict, Beer posted on X in January 2024: "If you think I'd ever want an innocent person to be killed, you do not know me, and that is simply outrageous." She further said, "You can be Jewish and also want peace for all people, including Palestinian people, which is, of course, what I want. No innocent person deserves to die."

=== Fashion and cosmetics ===
In September 2020, Morphe Cosmetics launched a collection with Beer called Morphe x Madison Beer. In June 2021, Beer co-founded Know Beauty, a DNA personalization–based skincare brand, with Vanessa Hudgens. As of March 2023, Beer is no longer associated with the brand. In August 2021, she launched a 1990s–inspired clothing collection in collaboration with Boohoo.com.

== Discography ==
Studio albums

- Life Support (2021)
- Silence Between Songs (2023)
- Locket (2026)

== Tours ==
Headlining

- As She Pleases Tour (2018)
- The Life Support Tour (2021–2022)
- The Spinnin Tour (2024)
- The Locket Tour (2026)

== Filmography ==
=== As actress/personality ===
Year	Title	Role	Notes
2013	Louder Than Words	Amy	Film
2015	Todrick	Wendy	Episode: "Peter Perry"
2016	Hollywood Medium With Tyler Henry	Herself	Guest appearance
2019	Ridiculousness	Herself	Guest appearance
2020	RuPaul's Secret Celebrity Drag Race	Herself	Episode 4; contestant
2020	RuPaul's Secret Celebrity Drag Race	Coral Fixation	Episode 4; contestant
2020	RuPaul's Drag Race All Stars	Guest judge	Episode: "I'm In Love!"
2023	Good Mythical Morning	Guest	Episode: "Will it Cannoli"
2026	Good Mythical Morning	Guest	Episode: "Leaving Things in Beer For A Month"

=== As a performer ===
Year	Title	Song(s)	Album/Format
2015	AAKD Live	Melodies	Single
2017	PNC Live Studio	Dead, Toxic (Britney Spears Cover)	As She Pleases In the Zone (Britney Spears)
2018	Maybelline Urban Catwalk Show	Home With You	As She Pleases
2018	Opening Ceremony (Mastercard) | 2018 World Championship	Pop/Stars	Single
2018	Super girl Surf Pro Concert Series	Songs from As She Pleases	As She Pleases
2018	Serramonte Centre Mall Performance	Songs from As She Pleases	As She Pleases
2018	IHeart Radio (Just Show Up Show)	Songs from As She Pleases	As She Pleases
2018	Miami Y100 Jingle Ball	Dead, Creep (Radiohead cover), Hurts Like Hell	As She Pleases Pablo Honey (Radiohead) Single
2018	IHeart Radio	Tyler Durden	As She Pleases
2018	Lollapalooza	Fools	As She Pleases
2018	KDWB 101.3	Hurts Like Hell	Single
2019	Vevo	Hurts Like Hell, Tyler Durden	Single As She Pleases
2019	BottleRock Napa	Dead, Fools, Creep, Hurts Like Hell	As She Pleases Pablo Honey (Radiohead) Single
2019	Beale Street Music Festival in Memphis	Hurts Like Hell, All Day & Night	Single Snacks (Jax Jones)
2019	ACL Festival	Teenager in Love	As She Pleases
2019	Wango Tango	Home With You, Fools, Creep, Heartless, Blue	As She Pleases Pablo Honey (Radiohead) Life Support
2019	92 Pro-FM	Dead, Hurts Like Hell	As She Pleases Single
2020	Live with Kelly and Ryan	Selfish	Life Support
2020	MTV Europe Music Awards	Baby	Life Support
2020	Genius (Home Performance)	Baby	Life Support
2020	Vevo Lift	Boyshit, Selfish	Life Support
2020	NHL (National Anthem)	National Anthem	
2021	Jimmy Kimmel Live!	Boyshit	Life Support
2021	Genius Open Mic	Reckless	Silence Between Songs
2021	Life Support Live in Concert	Songs from Life Support	Life Support
2021	The Ellen DeGeneres Show	All I Have to Do Is Dream (The Everly Brothers Cover)	Single
2021	The Ellen DeGeneres Show	Blue	Life Support
2021	Vevo	Reckless, Sour Times	Silence Between Songs Life Support
2021	MTV France (MTV Push)	Selfish, Sour Times	Life Support
2022	WeHo OutLoud Pride Festival	Good in Goodbye, Selfish, Baby, Creep, Boyshit, Dear Society	Life Support Pablo Honey
2022	Reading and Leeds Festivals	Baby, Good in Goodbye, Emotional Bruises, Selfish, Dangerous, All Day & Night, Boyshit	Life Support Snacks
2022	Genius (Open Mic)	Showed Me (How I Fell in Love With You)	Silence Between Songs
2022	AMFAR Gala Event	Showed Me (How I Fell in Love With You)	Silence Between Songs
2023	Jimmy Kimmel Live!	Sweet Relief	Silence Between Songs
2023	Good Morning America	Home To Another One, Reckless, Selfish	Silence Between Songs Life Support
2023	Forbes	Reckless, Showed Me (How I Fell in Love With You), Selfish	Silence Between Songs Life Support
2023	BBC Radio 1 Live Lounge	Spinnin', Glimpse of Us (Joji cover)	Silence Between Songs SMITHEREENS (Joji)
2023	Genius (Open Mic)	King Of Everything	Silence Between Songs
2023	Vevo	Envy The Leaves	Silence Between Songs
2023	Vevo	Ryder	Silence Between Songs
2023	Vevo	Sweet Relief	Silence Between Songs

== Bibliography ==
- Beer, Madison (2023). The Half of It: A Memoir. HarperCollins.

== Awards and nominations ==
Award	Year	Category	Recipient	Result	Ref.
Berlin Music Video Awards	2020	Best VFX	"Good In Goodbye"	Nominated	
Electronic Dance Music Awards	2019	Best Banger	"Hurts Like Hell (Freaks ‘n’ Beatz remix)"	Nominated	
Electronic Dance Music Awards	2025	Pop-Dance Anthem of the Year	"Make You Mine"	Won	
Game Audio Network Guild Awards	2019	Best Original Song	"Pop/Stars"	Nominated	
Game Audio Network Guild Awards	2021	Best Original Song	"More"	Won	
Grammy Awards	2024	Best Immersive Audio Album	Silence Between Songs	Nominated	
Grammy Awards	2025	Best Dance Pop Recording	“Make You Mine”	Nominated	
Hollywood Music Video Awards	2025	Best Directing	“Make You Mine”	Nominated	
Hollywood Music Video Awards	2025	Best Pop	“Make You Mine”	Nominated	
Hollywood Music Video Awards	2025	Best Sci-Fi/Thriller	“Make You Mine”	Won	
iHeartRadio Music Awards	2025	Dance Song of the Year	“Make You Mine”	Nominated	
MTV Europe Music Awards	2021	Best Push Act	Herself	Nominated	
MTV Video Music Awards	2021	Push Performance of the Year	“Selfish”	Nominated	
Nickelodeon Kids' Choice Awards	2024	Favorite Social Music Star	Herself	Nominated	
Shorty Awards	2019	Best in Games	“Pop/Stars”	Won	
Shorty Awards	2021	Best in Games	“More”	Finalist	
Shorty Awards	2021	Best in Videos	“More”	Gold	
Teen Choice Awards	2019	Choice Female Web Star	Herself	Nominated	
Webby Awards	2021	Video - Music (Branded)	"More"	Won	
