= Madeline the Person =

American singer-songwriter

Madeline The Person
- Born: Madeline Estelle Holste; September 14, 2001 (age 24); Houston, TX, United States
- Label: Warner Records 2021–2023

Madeline Estelle Holste (born September 14, 2001), known professionally as Madeline The Person, previously known as Maddy Estelle, is an American singer-songwriter from Houston, Texas. Her songs explore drama, queerness, and self-expression.

== Life & career ==
Madeline The Person grew up in Bellaire, Texas, where she attended Hebrew school and graduated from Xavier Educational Academy. She grew up in a musical household: Her father was an audiophile and CD collector, her mother a classic pianist, and her brother a Flamenco guitar and Jazz piano player. She started playing piano at age four, started voice lessons at age seven, and wrote her first original song at age eleven. She later used songwriting to cope with grief over her father, who died when she was 15 years old. She cites Aretha Franklin and Demi Lovato as musical influences.

Madeline the Person began posting singing videos on Instagram in middle school. She would often cover songs by small artists and get reposted, catching the attention of her current manager. She released her first original song, "Back to the Start," under the stage name Maddy Estelle in 2016. Under this name, she released one album, My Favorite Words, in 2018.

After graduating from high school, Madeline The Person wanted to become a doctor like her mother but decided to study songwriting at Berklee College of Music. Under the guidance of her manager, she began posting singing videos on TikTok during the pandemic, where she was noticed and signed by Warner Records in 2021. Shortly after signing, she released her debut single under the stage name Madeline the Person, "As A Child," about the loss of her father in childhood.

In 2022, she released "Mean," which went viral on TikTok with over 910,000 video creations, leading to a remix featuring Noah Kahan. That same year, she performed live for her first time with The Aces.

In 2023, she parted ways with Warner Records and became an independent artist. She teamed up with Petro AP as her executive producer. In February 2025, she released the single "Rabbit Hole".

== Live performances ==
Madeline the Person did her first live performance in the fall of 2021, as the opening act on The Aces, North American headline Tour. Her second live show took place at the Wonder Ballroom in Portland, Oregon, where she performed songs from her first two EPs. Her first small main solo close show cam in Denver, Colorado.

== Discography ==
=== EPs ===
- Chapter 1: The Longing(2021)
- Chapter 2: The Shedding(2021)
- Chapter 3: The Burning(2022)
- Chapter 4: The End(2023)

=== Singles ===
- Mean!(2022)
- Tantrum (2023)
- Rabbit Hole (2025)
- Closest Thing (2025)
- Back to the Start (2016)
