= Dead (Madison Beer song) =

Single by Madison Beer

from the EP As She Pleases
- Released: May 19, 2017
- Genre: Indie pop
- Length: 3:14
- Label: Access
- Songwriters: Brittany Amaradio; Madison Love; Michael Keenan
- Producer: Michael Keenan

Madison Beer singles chronology
"Something Sweet" (2015)	"Dead" (2017)	"Say It to My Face" (2017)

"Dead" is a song by American singer Madison Beer. It was released on May 19, 2017 by Access, as the lead single from her debut EP, As She Pleases (2018). The song was written by Brittany Amaradio, Madison Love, and Michael Keenan, the latter of whom produced the track. Two remixes and an acoustic version of the song were also released.

== Composition ==
Speaking about the song's inspiration, Beer stated "It's about a situation myself and so many others find themselves in when you feel ignored and not loved in a relationship, yet you’re still hearing empty words like 'I can't live without you,' and it tears you up inside so I wanted to make the anthem for staying strong through this moment and not taking any shit!"

"Dead" is an indie pop song with a length of three minutes and fourteen seconds. Musically, it features breathy vocals from Beer over a beat that has been described by one music critic as "danceable". Taylor Weatherby, writing for Billboard, compared the song to the works of Ariana Grande and JoJo. Lyrically, it has been described as a breakup anthem where the singer confronts a lying boyfriend. In the chorus, Beer sings "You say you can't live without me, so why aren't you dead yet?" Some sources suggested that the lyrics were about Beer's breakup with American singer Jack Gilinsky.In February 2025, a demo of the song sung by British singer Rita Ora surfaced online.

== Critical reception ==
Mike Wass, writing for Idolator, called the song a "biting kiss-off" that "repositions her as an alt-pop diva". Mike Nied, also writing for Idolator, wrote the song's chorus "boasted one of the best lyrics of the year". On behalf of Billboard, Taylor Weatherby described the song as "edgy" and wrote that it "is sure to strike a chord with just about anyone who hears it".

== Music video ==
The music video for "Dead" was released on August 3, 2017. It was directed by Darren Craig. The video features the singer singing much of the song in a bathtub, with scenes of Beer and an ex-boyfriend interspersed throughout. Presley Gerber Mike Wass of Idolator called the video "sexy and emotional".

== Track listing ==
Digital download

1. "Dead" – 3:14

Cedric Gervais Remix

1. "Dead" (Cedric Gervais Remix) – 3:19

Acoustic

1. "Dead" (Acoustic) – 3:44

Laibert Remix

1. "Dead" (Laibert Remix Radio Edit) – 3:59
2. "Dead" (Laibert Remix Club Edit) – 4:25

== Charts ==
Chart (2017)	Peak position
UK Indie (Official Charts)	34

== Certifications ==
Region	Certification	Certified units/sales
Australia (ARIA)	Platinum	70,000^{‡}
Canada (Music Canada)	Platinum	80,000^{‡}
New Zealand (RMNZ)	Platinum	30,000^{‡}
United Kingdom (BPI)	Silver	200,000^{‡}
United States (RIAA)	Gold	500,000^{‡}
^{‡} Sales+streaming figures based on certification alone.
