= I Won't Let You Walk Away =

Single by Mako featuring Madison Beer
- Released: 24 February 2015
- Recorded: 2014
- Genre: EDM
- Length: 2:46
- Label: Ultra Records
- Songwriters: Logan Light; Alex Seaver; Madison Beer
- Producer: Mako

Mako singles chronology
"Ghosts" (2014)	"I Won't Let You Walk Away" (2015)	"Not Alone" (2015)

"I Won't Let You Walk Away" is a song recorded by American DJ Mako and singer Madison Beer. It was released on February 24, 2015, via Ultra Records.

== Background ==
The song is a vocal version of the instrumental single by Mako called "Sunburst" released in 2014. Alex Seaver of Mako said in an interview "I had bought this $45 Fender guitar in Glendale and just started tracking some stuff, and that turned into “Sunburst” — the instrumental. We put that up just as a nice, fun summer tune and everybody was just like we want to hear a vocal over it. We had never considered it. The second they said it, it seemed like, 'Oh, this would be a great idea'. Why not? We knew what kind of song we wanted at that point, because the track sounds a certain way. As soon as we got Madison on it, it came to life really easily because the sound is perfect for her voice, for the style, the writing and the track. It was just a great fit.".

== Music video ==
The official music video was uploaded by Ultra Records' YouTube channel on 24 February 2015.

== Charts ==
Chart (2015)	Peak position
US Hot Dance/Electronic Songs	43
US Dance/Electronic Digital Songs	33
