= Make You Mine (Madison Beer song) =

2024 single by Madison Beer

Single by Madison Beer

from the album Locket
- Released: February 9, 2024
- Recorded: October 2023
- Genre: Dance-pop; electropop; synth-pop
- Length: 3:41
- Label: Epic; Sing It Loud
- Songwriters: Madison Beer; Leroy Clampitt
- Producers: Beer; Clampitt

Madison Beer singles chronology
"Spinnin" (2023)	"Make You Mine" (2024)	"15 Minutes" (2024)

Music video
- "Make You Mine" on YouTube

"Make You Mine" is a song by American singer-songwriter Madison Beer. It was released on February 9, 2024, through Epic Records and Sing It Loud as the lead single from her third studio album, Locket (2026). Written and produced by Beer and Leroy Clampitt, "Make You Mine" infuses dance-pop, electropop, and synth-pop with EDM, house, and lo-fi elements.

"Make You Mine" was well-received both critically and commercially. It peaked at number nine on the Bubbling Under Hot 100, making it her highest peak on the chart. The song reached the top 40 in Estonia, Greece, Ireland, Lebanon, Lithuania, Norway, Poland, and Saudi Arabia, and peaked at number 50 on the UK Singles Chart. "Make You Mine" also received a nomination for Best Dance Pop Recording at the 67th Annual Grammy Awards.

== Background and release ==
On February 6, 2024, Beer shared a snippet of "Make You Mine" on social media. The next day, she announced the song's release date and cover art. "Make You Mine" was released on February 9, 2024, which was accompanied by a lyric visualizer on YouTube inspired by the 2009 American film Jennifer's Body. The song was written and produced by Beer and Leroy Clampitt in October 2023. Beer co-directed a music video for the song with Aerin Moreno, which was released on April 24, 2024, and also contains references to Jennifer's Body.

"Make You Mine" has been variously described as a pop, dance-pop, synth-pop, and electropop track, with EDM, house, and lo-fi elements.

== Commercial performance ==
Commercially, "Make You Mine" was primarily a radio driven single. It peaked at number 10 on Billboard's Mainstream Top 40 airplay chart dated September 7, 2024, despite failing to enter the main Billboard Hot 100. It surpassed 2018's "Home with You" (No. 22) as her highest charting entry on the Pop Airplay chart. It did, however, debut at number nine on the US Bubbling Under Hot 100 chart for the week dated February 24, 2024. Nonetheless, "Make You Mine" did not appear on any remaining Billboard component charts such as the Digital Songs or Streaming Songs charts altogether.

== Music video ==
An accompanying music video for "Make You Mine", co-directed by the singer along with Aerin Moreno, was released on April 24, 2024. It contains references to the 2009 film Jennifer's Body and the 1999 film American Beauty.

== Accolades ==
Awards and nominations for "Make You Mine"
Organization	Year	Category	Result	Ref.
Grammy Awards	2025	Best Dance Pop Recording	Nominated	
Hollywood Music Video Awards	2025	Best Directing	Nominated	
Hollywood Music Video Awards	2025	Best Pop	Nominated	
Hollywood Music Video Awards	2025	Best Sci-Fi/Thriller	Won	
iHeartRadio Music Awards	2025	Dance Song of the Year	Nominated	
Electronic Dance Music Awards	2025	Pop-Dance Anthem of the Year	Won	

== Credits and personnel ==
Credits adapted from Tidal.

- Madison Beer – vocals, songwriter, producer, programming, keyboards
- Leroy Clampitt – songwriter, producer, engineer, programming, bass, drums, guitar, keyboards, percussion
- Idania Valencia – mastering engineer
- Mitch McCarthy – mixing engineer

== Charts ==
=== Weekly charts ===
Weekly chart performance for "Make You Mine"
Chart (2024–2026)	Peak position
Austria (Ö3 Austria Top 40)	60
Canada Hot 100 (Billboard)	82
Canada CHR/Top 40 (Billboard)	29
CIS Airplay (TopHit)	89
Czech Republic Singles Digital (ČNS IFPI)	90
Estonia Airplay (TopHit)	18
Global 200 (Billboard)	186
Greece International (IFPI)	19
Ireland (IRMA)	33
Lebanon (Lebanese Top 20)	15
Lithuania (AGATA)	29
Lithuania Airplay (TopHit)	24
Netherlands (Single Top 100)	65
Netherlands (Tipparade)	12
New Zealand Hot Singles (RMNZ)	8
Norway (VG-lista)	35
Poland (Polish Airplay Top 100)	8
Poland (Polish Streaming Top 100)	43
Saudi Arabia (IFPI)	13
Slovakia Singles Digital (ČNS IFPI)	84
Sweden Heatseeker (Sverigetopplistan)	3
Switzerland (Schweizer Hitparade)	85
UK Singles (Official Charts)	50
US Bubbling Under Hot 100 (Billboard)	9
US Dance Airplay (Billboard)	1
US Pop Airplay (Billboard)	10

=== Monthly charts ===
Monthly chart performance for "Make You Mine"
Chart (2024)	Peak position
CIS Airplay (TopHit)	96
Estonia Airplay (TopHit)	18
Lithuania Airplay (TopHit)	29

=== Year-end charts ===
2024 year-end chart performance for "Make You Mine"
Chart (2024)	Position
Estonia Airplay (TopHit)	46
Poland (Polish Airplay Top 100)	45
US Dance/Mix Show Airplay (Billboard)	6
US Mainstream Top 40 (Billboard)	32

2025 year-end chart performance for "Make You Mine"
Chart (2025)	Position
Estonia Airplay (TopHit)	189

== Certifications ==
Certifications for "Make You Mine"
Region	Certification	Certified units/sales
Austria (IFPI Austria)	Gold	15,000^{‡}
Brazil (Pro-Música Brasil)	3× Platinum	120,000^{‡}
France (SNEP)	Gold	100,000^{‡}
Hungary (MAHASZ)	2× Platinum	8,000^{‡}
New Zealand (RMNZ)	Gold	15,000^{‡}
Poland (ZPAV)	Platinum	50,000^{‡}
United Kingdom (BPI)	Silver	200,000^{‡}
Streaming
Greece (IFPI Greece)	Platinum	2,000,000^{†}
^{‡} Sales+streaming figures based on certification alone.^{†} Streaming-only figures based on certification alone.

== Release history ==
Release history and formats for "Make You Mine"
Region	Date	Format	Label(s)	Ref.
Various	February 9, 2024	Digital download; streaming	Epic; Sing It Loud	

== See also ==
- List of Billboard number-one dance songs of 2024
