= Home with You (Madison Beer song) =

2018 song by Madison Beer

- Remix EP cover art

Single by Madison Beer

from the EP As She Pleases
- Released: March 10, 2018
- Genre: R&B; indie pop
- Length: 3:10
- Label: Access
- Songwriters: Jane Bennett; Leroy Clampitt; Rachel Keen
- Producer: Big Taste

Madison Beer singles chronology
"Say It to My Face" (2017)	"Home with You" (2018)	"Pop/Stars" (2018)

"Home with You" is a song by American singer Madison Beer. It was released on March 10, 2018, as the third single from her debut EP As She Pleases (2018). The R&B and indie pop song has a tropical dancehall type beat.

== Composition ==
"Home with You" has been described as a "self-assured anthem" over a tropical beat. The song's lyrical content has been described as "a woman standing up for herself and not caving to someone else's sexual desires". Its chorus consists of the lyrics: "I ain't got no time for no games. Tell me what you like, but it's never gonna change. So you do what you wan-wanna do. And I'm not going home with you". Musically "Home with You" infuses contemporary R&B with indie pop on a dancehall type beat.

== Critical reception ==
Mike Nied of Idolator called the song and music video "a vibrant release that is sure to resonate with the hitmaker's fans". MTV UK wrote the song contains "quite a powerful and poignant tone—all the meanwhile being so dance-able and so easy to sing along to".

== Commercial performance ==
"Home with You" peaked at number 22 on the US Mainstream Top 40 Airplay chart.

== Track listing ==
Remixes EP

1. "Home with You" (Alphalove Remix) – 4:43
2. "Home with You" (Blu-Rey and Tone Terra Remix) – 3:06

== Music video ==
An accompanying music video for "Home with You" was released on June 14, 2018. It consists of lo-fi shots and visual effects, as well as scenes of the singer in a skate park and a bar, as well as dancers.

== Charts ==
Chart (2018)	Peak position
Belgium (Ultratip Bubbling Under Flanders)	–
Canada CHR/Top 40 (Billboard)	34
Greece International Digital Singles (IFPI)	97
Ireland (IRMA)	93
Norway (VG-lista)	21
UK Indie (OCC)	37
US Pop Airplay (Billboard)	22

== Certifications ==
Region	Certification	Certified units/sales
Australia (ARIA)	Gold	35,000^{‡}
Canada (Music Canada)	Platinum	80,000^{‡}
New Zealand (RMNZ)	Gold	15,000^{‡}
Norway (IFPI Norway)	Platinum	60,000^{‡}
United Kingdom (BPI)	Silver	200,000^{‡}
United States (RIAA)	Gold	500,000^{‡}
^{‡} Sales+streaming figures based on certification alone.
