= Bittersweet (Madison Beer song) =

2025 single by Madison Beer

Single by Madison Beer

from the album Locket
- Released: October 10, 2025
- Genre: Synth-pop
- Length: 3:22
- Label: Epic; Sing It Loud
- Songwriters: Madison Beer; Tim Sommers; Madi Yanofsky; Jon Robert Hall
- Producers: Beer; One Love

Madison Beer singles chronology
"Yes Baby" (2025)	"Bittersweet" (2025)	"Bad Enough" (2026)

Music video
- "Bittersweet" on YouTube

"Bittersweet" is a song recorded by American singer Madison Beer for her third studio album, Locket (2026). It was released by Sing It Loud and Epic Records on October 10, 2025, as the third single from the album. It was written and produced by Beer and One Love, with additional writing from Madi Yanofsky and Jon Robert Hall. A synth-pop track, "Bittersweet" is about moving on from a failed relationship.

"Bittersweet" was both commercially and critically successful. The song received acclaim for its lyrics and hooks. It reached the top ten in Bolivia, Malaysia, New Zealand, the Philippines, and Singapore, and the top twenty in Costa Rica and Indonesia. "Bittersweet" became Beer's first song to reach the Billboard Hot 100, peaking at number 68, while also peaking at number 17 on the Pop Airplay chart.

== Background ==
In a press statement, Beer said that the song is about "the end of a chapter and the difficulty of coming to terms with it, while also recognizing that deep down you know it's for the best—and finding peace in that along the journey." She teased the song through the music video for her previous single "Yes Baby".

== Lyrics and composition ==
"Bittersweet" has been described as a synth-pop song. Lyrically, it finds Beer mournfully reflecting on the end of a relationship, while trying to piece together her feelings as she moves forward and describing both positive and negative consequences. The song opens with "fluttery arpeggiated keyboards", and in the first verse, Beer describes being confused and surprised by the outcome of the relationship, as she had thought it was stable. She croons about having recovered from the breakup while criticizing her ex-lover for his dishonesty: "Now that it's over, you blame it all on me / I know I should be bitter, but baby / Right now I'm bittersweet / I'm getting over what you put me through / And I'd say I'm done crying, but baby / I don't lie like you do". The second verse continues the topic of feeling sad but growing from her experience. Throughout the song, Beer also adds multiple ad-libs of her laughing to convey sarcasm.

== Critical reception ==
"Bittersweet" received widespread acclaim from critics. Allyson Franzo of Melodic Magazine wrote, "Lyrically, Beer is her usual sharp self, but she also doesn't fail to show vulnerability. She cuts deep with lyrics like 'One day I'll wake up sad / but go to bed so glad / knowing you know what you could've had,' but also never seems to be petty when singing it. There's strength in her vocal performance without having to deliver any screaming; just the confidence that makes you stronger when surviving something that may have been messy." Nmesoma Okechukwu of Euphoria Magazine commented, "She blesses listeners with a strong hook and beautiful harmonies, both of which beautifully complement the song's bittersweet message. Beer has been perfecting her sound through the years, and I'm not going to say that she won't ever beat this, but for now, I just want to call it perfect. Her vocal work never disappoints, and the production, which, by the way, Beer contributed to, supported her ethereal vocals."

== Music video ==
The music video was released on October 21, 2025. It was written by Madison Beer, who also directed it with Iris Kim. It opens with Beer visiting the house of her boyfriend (played by Sean Kaufman), on a cul-de-sac in a suburban neighborhood. After they share an uncomfortable silent moment, Kaufman gives her a box of things and breaks up with her, upsetting her. As she leaves, Beer is suddenly surrounded by a parade, including a marching band, celebrating her new single status, which causes her to feel relieved and pleased. She enters her home and quickly exits to encounter the paparazzi and reporters asking her about the breakup. Beer later happily performs on a float in the middle of a parade. The scene is juxtaposed with flashbacks of her arguing with Kaufman and crying in bed. As their argument continues, clips of their relationship's positive moments are shown in between. The video ends with a teary-eyed Beer clutching a locket in bed.

== Charts ==
=== Weekly charts ===
Weekly chart performance
Chart (2025–2026)	Peak position
Australia (ARIA)	80
Bolivia Anglo Airplay (Monitor Latino)	5
Canada Hot 100 (Billboard)	62
Canada CHR/Top 40 (Billboard)	39
Costa Rica Anglo Airplay (Monitor Latino)	13
El Salvador Anglo Airplay (Monitor Latino)	3
Estonia Airplay (TopHit)	60
Global 200 (Billboard)	96
Guatemala Anglo Airplay (Monitor Latino)	17
Indonesia (Billboard)	17
Ireland (IRMA)	74
Japan Hot Overseas (Billboard Japan)	5
Kazakhstan Airplay (TopHit)	31
Lithuania Airplay (TopHit)	32
Malaysia (IFPI)	6
Malaysia International (RIM)	3
New Zealand Hot Singles (RMNZ)	8
Philippines (IFPI)	13
Philippines Hot 100 (Billboard Philippines)	10
Singapore (RIAS)	9
UK Singles (Official Charts)	81
US Billboard Hot 100	68
US Adult Pop Airplay (Billboard)	33
US Pop Airplay (Billboard)	17

=== Monthly charts ===
Monthly chart performance
Chart (2025–2026)	Peak position
Estonia Airplay (TopHit)	72
Lithuania Airplay (TopHit)	40
Kazakhstan Airplay (TopHit)	43

== Release history ==
Release history and formats
Region	Date	Format(s)	Label	Ref.
Various	October 10, 2025	Digital download; streaming	Epic; Sing It Loud	
United States	October 14, 2025	Contemporary hit radio	Epic	
Italy	October 31, 2025	Radio airplay	Sony Italy	
