= Leroy Clampitt =

New Zealand record producer

- Born: Leroy James Clampitt; 24 October 1992 (age 33); Pirongia, New Zealand
- Occupations: Producer; singer; songwriter
- Years active: 2016–present

Leroy James Clampitt (born 24 October 1992), formerly known as Big Taste, is a New Zealand producer and songwriter based in Los Angeles, California. Leroy has co-written and produced songs for artists including Justin Bieber, Madison Beer, Sabrina Carpenter, Laufey, Mallrat, Lily Allen, and Ashe.

Clampitt is listed in the APRA billion streams list, which acknowledges songwriters of original songs that have been streamed over one billion stimes globally.

In 2022, he signed a publishing deal with Reservoir Media.

Clampitt released his debut solo album Get Happy in August 2026. Singles I'm Going To Die, Easy Daisy, and Ricky Martin were released from the album.

== Select discography ==
Year	Title	Artist	Credit
2026	Locket	Madison Beer	Co-producer, co-writer
2025	"Pussy Palace"	Lily Allen	Co-producer, co-writer
2025	"Sleep Walking"	Lily Allen	Co-producer, co-writer
2025	"Beg For Me"	Lily Allen	Co-producer, co-writer
2025	"Fruity Loop"	Lily Allen	Co-producer, co-writer
2025	"Wild Guess"	Ruel	Co-producer, co-writer
2025	Incurable Optimist EP	Hohnen Ford	Producer, co-writer
2025	"Yes Baby"	Madison Beer	Co-producer, co-writer
2025	Blame the Gods	Yeemz	Producer, co-writer
2025	"All At Once"	F1 Movie and Madison Beer	Co-producer, co-writer
2025	"Gut Feelings"	Debbii Dawson	Producer, co-writer
2025	Papaya	Mina Okabe	Producer, co-writer
2025	"Zero to Hero"	Minecraft Movie, Benee	Producer
2025	"Lost Your Faith"	Ava Max	Co-producer, co-writer
2025	"Seesaw"	Twice	Co-producer, co-writer
2024	"15 Minutes"	Madison Beer	Co-producer, co-writer
2024	"Grow Old Without You"	Georgia Lines	Co-writer
2024	"In the City"	Yeemz	Additional producer, mixer
2024	"Make You Mine"	Madison Beer	Producer, co-writer
2024	"In Fall in Full"	Yeemz	Mixer
2024	"Turn the Lights Back On"	Billy Joel	Guitar, synth bass
2024	"Burning in Flames"	Kaiser Chiefs	Additional producer, co-writer
2024	"Turn the TV On"	Debbii Dawson	Producer, co-writer
2024	"Wayside"	Georgia Lines	Producer, co-writer
2024	"It Is What It Is"	Rachel Chinouriri	Producer, co-writer
2024	"Maybe One Day"	Mina Okabe	Producer, co-writer
2023	"King of Everything"	Madison Beer	Co-executive producer, producer, co-writer
2023	"Silence Between Songs"	Madison Beer	Co-executive producer, producer, co-writer
2023	"Dangerous"	Madison Beer	Co-executive producer, producer, co-writer
2023	"Showed Me (How I Fell in Love with You)"	Madison Beer	Co-executive producer, producer, co-writer
2023	"At Your Worst"	Madison Beer	Co-executive producer, producer, co-writer
2023	"I Wonder"	Madison Beer	Co-executive producer, producer, co-writer
2023	"Nothing Matters but You"	Madison Beer	Co-executive producer, producer, co-writer
2023	"Ryder"	Madison Beer	Co-executive producer, producer, co-writer
2023	"17"	Madison Beer	Co-executive producer, producer, co-writer
2023	"Envy the Leaves"	Madison Beer	Co-executive producer, producer, co-writer
2023	"Sweet Relief"	Madison Beer	Co-executive producer, producer, co-writer
2023	"Better Things"	Aespa	Producer, arranger, composer, lyricist, co-writer
2023	"Spinnin"	Madison Beer	Producer, co-writer
2023	"Home to Another One"	Madison Beer	Producer, co-writer
2023	"Karaoke Star"	Hunter Daily	Producer
2023	"Cosmos"	Zinadelphia	Producer, co-writer
2023	"Things I Wish You Said"	Sabrina Carpenter	Producer, co-writer
2023	"Lonesome"	Sabrina Carpenter	Producer, co-writer
2023	"Tastes So Good"	Sabrina Claudio	Producer, co-writee
2023	"Skyboy"	Duncan Laurence	Producer
	"This Is How It Feels"	Laufey, d4vd	Co-writer
2022	"I Got a Lot to Lose"	Gnash	Producer, co-writee
2022	"I Want It All"	Duncan Laurence	Producer, co-writer
2022	"If You Fall In Love"	Broods	Producer, co-writer
2022	"Rae's Theme"	Ashe	Producer, co-writer
2022	"Shower with My Clothes On"	Ashe	Additional producer
2022	"OMW"	Ashe	Co-producer, co-writer
2022	"Emotional"	Ashe	Co-producer, co-writer
2022	"Love You Need"	Ashe	Co-producer, co-writer
2022	"It Can't Be You"	Ashe	Co-producer, co-writer
2022	"Loose Ends"	Ashe	Producer, co-writer
2022	"San Jose"	Ashe	Producer, co-writer
2022	"Love Is Letting Go" (featuring Diane Keaton)	Ashe	Producer, co-writer
2022	"Count on Me"	Ashe	Producer, co-writer
2022	"Fun While It Lasted"	Ashe	Producer, co-writer
2022	"Showed Me"	Madison Beer	Producer, co-writer
2022	"There I Said It"	Valencia Grace	Producer, co-writer
2022	"Dangerous"	Madison Beer	Producer, co-writer
2022	"Night Light"	Laufey	Producer, co-writer
2022	"Electric Life"	Duncan Laurence	Producer, co-writer
2022	"I Have Never Felt More Alive"	Madison Beer	Producer, co-writer
2022	"Emails I Can't Send"	Sabrina Carpenter	Producer, co-writer
2022	"Read Your Mind"	Sabrina Carpenter	Producer, co-writer
2022	"Bet U Wanna"	Sabrina Carpenter	Producer, co-writer
2022	"Bad for Business"	Sabrina Carpenter	Producer, co-writer
2022	"Angry Woman"	Ashe	Producer, co-writer
2022	"On My Way"	Jimmie Allen and Jennifer Lopez	Co-writer
2022	"I'm Not My Body, It's Mine"	Mallrat	Producer, co-writer
2022	"Hope You're Not Happy"	Ashe	Additional producer
2022	"Will You Ever Be as Good as You Think You Are?"	Max Pope	Co-writer
2022	"Everything I Know About Love"	Laufey	Producer, co-writer
2022	"Settle Down"	Ricky Montgomery	Producer
2022	"Alone"	Rhys Lewis	Co-writer
2022	"Like All My Friends"	Francis Karel	Producer, co-writer
2022	"Another Man's Jeans"	Ashe	Producer, co-writer
2022	"Hey Beautiful"	How I Met Your Father – Theme Song	Producer
2021	"On My Way"	Jennifer Lopez	Writer
2021	"Skinny Dipping"	Sabrina Carpenter	Producer, co-writer
2021	"Pepeha"	Six60	Additional producer
2021	"August"	Madeline the Person and Adam Melchor	Producer, writer
2021	"Reckless"	Madison Beer	Producer, writer
2021	"Haunted"	Madeline the Person	Producer
2021	"Going Home"	Madeline the Person	Vocal producer, drums
2021	"Kansas"	Ashe	Co-executive producer, producer, writer
2021	"Ryne's Song"	Ashe	Co-executive producer, producer, writer
2021	"Serial Monogamist"	Ashe	Co-executive producer, producer, writer
2021	"Always"	Ashe	Co-executive producer, producer, writer
2021	"Not Mad Anymore"	Ashe	Co-executive producer, producer, writer
2021	"Taylor"	Ashe	Co-executive producer, producer, writer
2021	"When I'm Older"	Ashe	Co-executive producer, producer, writer
2021	"Love Is Not Enough"	Ashe	Co-executive producer, producer, writer
2021	"Me Without You"	Ashe	Co-executive producer, producer, writer
2021	"Gladly"	Madeline the Person	Producer
2021	"I Talk to the Sky"	Madeline the Person	Producer
2021	"Would You"	Mikey Dam	Co-Producer, writer
2021	"When I'm Older"	Ashe	Co-Executive Producer, producer, writer
2021	"I'm Fine"	Ashe	Co-executive producer, additional producer, writer
2021	"Friends Who Failed at Love"	Chloe Angelides	Producer, writer
2021	"Forget It All Tonight"	Chloe Angelides	Producer, writer
2021	"LSD"	Chloe Angelides	Producer, writer
2021	"As a Child"	Madeline the Person	Producer
2021	"I Choose You (Wedding Edition)"	Adam Melchor	Producer, writer
2021	"Till Forever Falls Apart"	Ashe and Finneas	Producer, writer
2021	"The Beginning"	Madison Beer	Producer, writer, executive producer
2021	"Default"	Madison Beer	Producer, writer, executive producer
2021	"Follow the White Rabbit"	Madison Beer	Producer, writer, executive producer
2021	"Effortlessly"	Madison Beer	Producer, writer, executive producer
2021	"Stay Numb and Carry On"	Madison Beer	Producer, writer, executive producer
2021	"Blue"	Madison Beer	Producer, writer, executive producer
2021	"Interlude"	Madison Beer	Producer, writer, executive producer
2021	"Homesick"	Madison Beer	Producer, writer, executive producer
2021	"Sour Times"	Madison Beer	Producer, writer, executive producer
2021	"Emotional Bruises"	Madison Beer	Producer, writer, executive producer
2021	"Everything Happens for a Reason"	Madison Beer	Producer, writer, executive producer
2021	"Channel Surfing/The End"	Madison Beer	Producer, writer, executive producer
2021	"Carried Away"	Surf Mesa, Madison Beer	Vocal producer
2020	"Boyshit"	Madison Beer	Writer, additional producer, executive producer
2020	"Is That a Thing?"	Carlie Hanson	Producer, writer
2020	"Baby"	Madison Beer	Producer, writer, executive producer
2020	"Save Myself"	Ashe	Additional producer, arrangement
2020	"The Real Wild Ones"	Phoebe Ryan	Producer, writer
2020	"Just Like Me"	Phoebe Ryan	Producer, writer
2020	"Fade"	Phoebe Ryan	Producer, writer
2020	"Fantasy"	Phoebe Ryan	Producer, writer
2020	"Henny"	Phoebe Ryan	Additional producer
2020	"Ring"	Phoebe Ryan	Additional producer
2020	Little Piece	Phoebe Ryan	Producer, writer
2020	"Exist"	Phoebe Ryan	Producer, writer
2020	"See Myself"	Phoebe Ryan	Producer, writer
2020	"Try It Sober"	Phoebe Ryan	Producer, writer
2020	"Talk to Me"	Phoebe Ryan	Producer, writer
2020	"Since I Was a Kid"	Lennon Stella	Producer, writer
2020	"Stained Glass"	Madison Beer	Producer, writer, executive producer
2020	"Madame X"	Allie X	Writer
2020	"Sarah Come Home"	Allie X	Writer
2020	"Selfish"	Madison Beer	Producer, writer, executive producer
2020	"Good In Goodbye"	Madison Beer	Producer, writer, executive producer
2019	"By Your Side"	Crystal Fighters (featuring Dagny)	Producer
2019	"In Case I Miss You"	Phoebe Ryan	Additional Production
2019	"Still Waiting to Start"	Nina Nesbitt	Producer, writer
2019	"Long Gone"	Six60	Producer, writer
2019	"Puppy Love"	Bülow	Producer, writer
2019	"Charlie"	Mallrat	Producer, writer
2019	"Build Me Up"	Phoebe Ryan	Producer, writer
2019	"In Disguise"	Ashe	Producer, writer
2019	"Dear Society"	Madison Beer	Producer, writer
2019	"WYA"	Carlie Hanson	Producer, writer
2019	"A Thousand Ways"	Phoebe Ryan	Producer, writer
2019	"Hospitalized"	Broods	Producer, writer
2019	"Everytime You Go I Cry"	Broods	Producer, writer
2019	"Malcriada"	Jarina De Marco	Producer, writer
2018	"Used to You Now"	Jack & Jack	Producer, writer
2018	"Toxins"	Carlie Hanson	Producer, writer
2018	"All My Love"	Crystal Fighters	Producer, writer
2018	"Home with You"	Madison Beer	Producer, writer
2018	"Over My Head"	Echosmith	Producer, writer
2018	"Look Back"	Betty Who	Producer, writer
2018	"Riding the Wave"	Sheppard	Producer, writer
2018	"Super Duper Nova"	Loz	Producer, writer
2018	"Hello"	PrettyMuch	Producer, writer
2018	"Room"	Shamir	Producer, writer
2017	"Genesis"	Dua Lipa	Producer
2017	"Look at Us Now" (featuring Ally Brooke and A$AP Ferg)	Lost Kings	Producer, writer
2017	"Nothing"	Vérité	Writer
2017	"Life of the Party"	Chelsea Jade	Producer, writer
2017	"Two Fux"	Adam Lambert	Producer, writer
2017	"Forgetting All About You" (featuring blackbear)	Phoebe Ryan	Producer, writer
2017	"James Has Changed"	Phoebe Ryan	Producer, writer
2016	"Company"	Justin Bieber	Producer, writer
2016	"Now and Later"	Sage The Gemini	Producer, writer
2016	"Takes One to Love One"	Maty Noyes	Producer, writer
2016	"Lil' Bit Wrong"	Maty Noyes	Producer, writer
2016	"Falling Out of Love"	Maty Noyes	Producer, writer
2016	"Overnight"	Jake Miller	Producer, writer
2016	"Superhuman"	Jake Miller	Producer, writer

== See also ==
- New Zealand American
- List of Universal Music Group artists
