= Reckless (Madison Beer song) =

2021 single by Madison Beer

Single by Madison Beer

from the album Silence Between Songs
- Released: June 4, 2021
- Recorded: October 2020
- Genre: Pop
- Length: 3:23
- Label: Epic; Sing It Loud
- Songwriters: Madison Beer; Jeremy Dussolliet; Leroy Clampitt; Tim Sommers
- Producers: Madison Beer; Leroy Clampitt; Tim Sommers

Madison Beer singles chronology
"Carried Away" (2021)	"Reckless" (2021)	"Dangerous" (2022)

Music video
- "Reckless" on YouTube

"Reckless" is a song by American singer Madison Beer. It was released on June 4, 2021 by Epic and Sing It Loud as the lead single from her second studio album, Silence Between Songs (2023). The track was written and produced by Madison Beer and Leroy Clampitt, with Kinetics & One Love's Tim Sommers and Jeremy Dussolliet also receiving writing credits.

== Composition ==
According to Beer, "Reckless" is about "how easy it is for some people in relationships to hurt others and move on without any guilt". She both co-wrote and co-produced the single.

People have so much power over their partner's feelings, yet many still choose to treat each other carelessly. I believe there is a balance to putting ourselves and our feelings first, while knowing we have the responsibility of treating people with respect, kindness, and consideration. It's so important to find that balance in every relationship and knowing when to move on if you can't.

— Madison Beer, NME

== Critical reception ==
Reckless was met with positive reviews upon its release. Clash called the song "...a wonderfully adult piece of pop songwriting." Hypebae said the song "demonstrat[es] her signature soothing vocals."

== Music video ==
The music video was released on June 29, 2021. It depicts Beer in a fairytale-like world where she climbs a ladder to get to the top of a stack of giant books; stands on the top of a car as it drives itself through a tunnel; and swims in an ocean with book pages in it.

== Credits and personnel ==
- Madison Beer – vocals, songwriting, production, composer, associated performer
- Leroy Clampitt – songwriting; production, composer, background vocals, bass, drums, guitar, programmer
- Tim Sommers – songwriting, production, composer, background vocals, drums, keyboards, programmer
- Jeremy Dussoliet – songwriting, composer
- Randy Merrill – mastering engineer
- Mitch McCarthy – mixing engineer
- Kinga Bacik – strings

== Charts ==
Chart performance for "Reckless"
Chart (2021)	Peak position
Ireland (IRMA)	98
Malaysia (RIM)	2
New Zealand Hot Singles (RMNZ)	11
Singapore (RIAS)	13
US Pop Airplay (Billboard)	38

== Certifications ==
Certifications for "Reckless"
Region	Certification	Certified units/sales
Brazil (Pro-Música Brasil)	Gold	20,000^{‡}
Canada (Music Canada)	Platinum	80,000^{‡}
New Zealand (RMNZ)	Gold	15,000^{‡}
United Kingdom (BPI)	Silver	200,000^{‡}
^{‡} Sales+streaming figures based on certification alone.

== Release history ==
Release history and formats for "Reckless"
Region	Date	Format	Label(s)	Ref.
Various	June 4, 2021	Digital download; streaming	Epic; Sony	
