= FAE grp =

British entertainment company

- Type: Private
- Industry: Entertainment
- Founded: 2015; 11 years ago
- Founder: Sarah Stennett; Len Blavatnik
- Headquarters: London, United Kingdom
- Area served: Worldwide
- Key people: Sarah Stennett (CEO); Stephen John Hendry (Director); Rodger Garfinkel (CFO); Jesse Dickson (Co-Vice President); Jay Grey (Co-Vice President); Le'Roy Benros (SVP of A&R); Oscar Scivier (VP of A&R)
- Services: Music management; Record label; Music publishing; Publishing; Sports Management; Venture capital
- Divisions: Access Records; First Access Publishing; First Access Sports
- Subsidiaries: Fund by First Access Entertainment LLC
- Website: www.faegrp.com

FAE grp (also known as First Access Entertainment Group) is an entertainment company founded by Sarah Stennett and Len Blavatnik, the owner of Access Industries. It launched in 2015 and is the successor to Stennett's first company Turn First Artists, which was absorbed into the new venture. Since then, the company has expanded beyond London to also include New York headquarters, the activities of the company have evolved to include a record label (Access Records), publishing (First Access Publishing), Sports Management (First Access Sports), and a seed funding venture called "Fund by First Access Entertainment".

The company is most known for managing recording artists Iggy Azalea, Ellie Goulding, Jessie J, Rita Ora, and Madison Beer. Prior to his death in 2017, then upcoming-rapper Lil Peep was managed through a joint-venture with FAE. His music has since been released posthumously through the company and Peep's estate. Also in 2019, American burlesque-come-recording group the Pussycat Dolls reformed and released new music with Access Records. Later that year Blavatnik would resign as a director from the company.

== History ==
First Access Entertainment's origins can be traced back to an earlier company, Turn First Artists, an artist management and development agency based out of West London, founded by music manager Sarah Stennett. With the agency, Stennett has been responsible for launching the careers of artists including Iggy Azalea, Rita Ora, Ellie Goulding, Zayn and Jessie J. Stennett also co-founded law firm SSB, which represents Adele, alongside setting up the Grammy Award-winning songwriting and production team the Invisible Men that includes her husband George Astasio.

In October 2015, Turn First was absorbed into a new joint venture launched by Stennett and Len Blavatnik's Access Industries, a privately held industrial group with major holdings in the music, media and telecommunications sectors. The new venture would be called First Access Entertainment (FEA) and encompassed both artist management and label services. Founded in 2015, the company offers services across artist and model management, recorded music, music publishing, strategic brand partnerships, TV/film development and sports management. It has offices in London, Los Angeles and New York. In 2017, Oscar Scivier joined Access Records as their vice president of A&R from Ultra Records.

Blavatnik would resign as a company director in October 2019 and was replaced with Stephen John Hendry. Upon announcing their reformation, American burlesque group-come recording group the Pussycat Dolls confirmed in 2020 that they would be releasing new music, including the song "React", through Access Records. "React" is their first independent release, as well as the group's first release in a decade. Scherzinger told Rap-Up that being "able to release our music independently at this moment in time feels incredibly empowering". In July 2022, A&R Executives Jesse Dixon and Jay Grey were promoted to the positions of Co-Vice Presidents of Music at FAE Group. Grey will lead on "publishing, records and management roster of talent" while Dixon will focus on growth and development of their roster of artists.

== Access Records and artist management services ==
=== Roster ===
As of 2021, First Access Entertainment is home to a range of acts including, but not limited to:

- Algee Smith
- Alexander Stewart
- Ashlee Simpson
- Bebe Rexha
- Brian D. Lee
- Conor Maynard
- Evan Ross
- iLoveMakonnen
- Jack & Jack
- Kara Marni
- Kiya Juliet
- Lion Babe
- MadeinTYO
- Madison Beer
- Ray BLK
- Rita Ora
- The Invisible Men
- Travis Mills
- MJ Rodriguez

=== Former clients ===
- Charles Hamilton (from 2015-2017)
- Nicole Scherzinger
- The Pussycat Dolls (record label services, 2019-2020)
- Zayn (from 2015-2018)
- Lil Peep (from 2016-2023)

=== Digital tours ===
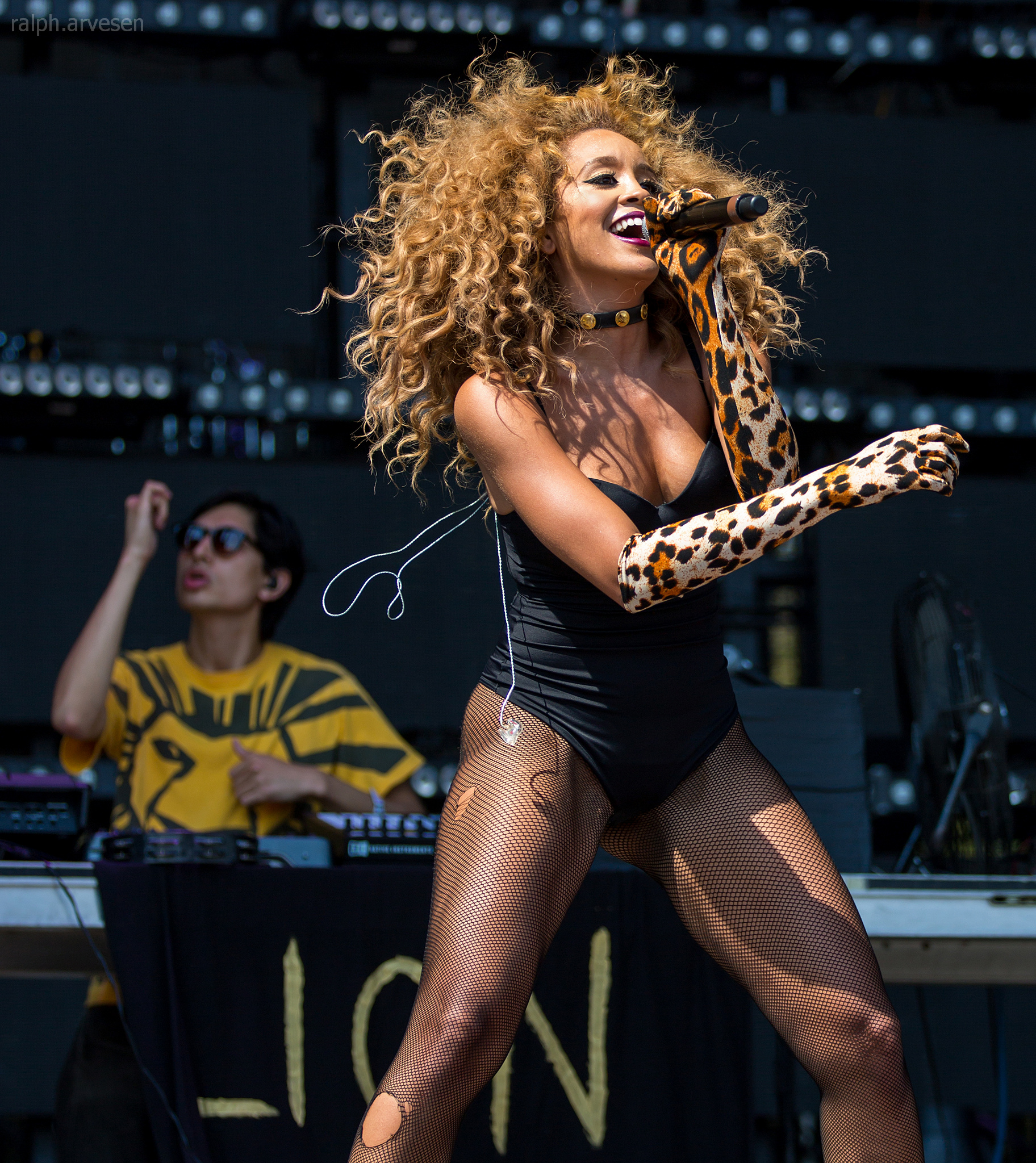
Lion Babe are one of First Access' clients and took part in one of the digital tours during the COVID-19 pandemic.

FEA has also worked on several digital tours in response to the COVID-19 pandemic. A 2020 feature in the Los Angeles Times covered senior VP of A&R at First Access Records, Le'Roy Benros, and how he oversaw "geofenced digital tours" for the artists Lion Babe and Kwamie Liv. Explaining the concept, Benros said "the economy has taken a big hit, and brands are trying to find creative and effective ways to reach their demographic. Brands also know that a main source of an independent artist's revenue stream has been depleted. I think it's a mutually beneficial partnership as long as it doesn't compromise the integrity and aesthetic of the artist." Benros explained that geofencing meant that free tickets available only to fans in the area where the artists would have performed anyway. Benros noted that in future, he would expect fans to pay for such opportunities.

== Other ventures ==
=== First Access Publishing ===
Following its first 18 months in service, FAE signed a joint agreement with publishing company Warner/Chappell to provide global support for FAE's "publishing roster for synchronization in film, TV, advertising, games and other media, as well as provide global copyright administration." Warner/Chappell CEO Jon Platt said of the venture, "we're very pleased to partner with the terrific team at First Access Entertainment." Platt noted that the venture would utilise skills at both companies and build "long, successful careers for diverse and accomplished songwriters, now and in the future." Stennett also commented on the venture during a press release, saying "I'm very much looking forward to working hand-in-hand with the incredible team at Warner/Chappell on developing and maximising the full scope of our artist's repertoire across a broad range of media and entertainment platforms."

=== First Access Sports ===
In 2018, FAE further diversified its operations, launching a sports management agency to represent sports stars from all fields. First Access Sports focusses on services aimed at young athletes. Stennett expanded on the company's purpose during an interview with Music Week, where she recognised youth athletes as "youth culture stars" and as being "powerful individuals", with "enormous cultural presence and influence." She said: "our mission is to create the foundations for exemplary performance within the scope of their core discipline and to enhance their visibility and ancillary value." Co-CEO Len Blavatnik agreed noting that FEA has foundations and previous successes in attracting, retaining and representing talent, he said: "FEA has a proven track record in talent discovery and representation. We have a team in place that can push the boundaries of traditional sports management."

=== Fund by Access Entertainment ===
Also in 2018, the company joined forces with Simon Tikhman to launch "Fund by Access Entertainment," a seed funding initiative for entrepreneurs launching ventures centred around youth culture. Of the venture, Tikhman said, "This is a natural next step – by seeding, incubating and giving aspiring companies access to the extensive global infrastructure of First Access Entertainment, they will have all the tools they need to take their ideas to the next level."

=== The Qube ===
First Access was also a founding investor in "The Qube", a "first of its kind venue and community for music professionals to connect and collaborate." The West London venue is a 22,000 square-foot premise designed by Munro Acoustics, featuring 30 soundproofed recording studios, breakout spaces, and a garden terrace due to open in January 2020. Other partners in the venture include; Riz Ahmed, Krept & Konan, Rudimental's Amir Amor, Mixcloud co-founder Nikhil Shah, and Concord Music.

== Controversies ==
=== Death of Lil Peep ===
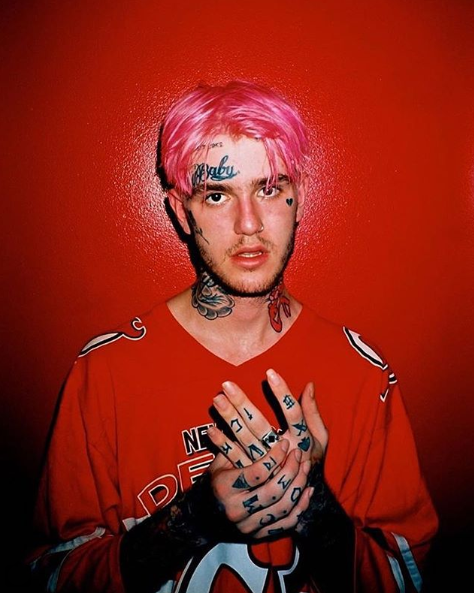
Lil Peep was managed by FAE as part of a joint venture agreement, prior to his death in 2017.

In 2017, American rapper Lil Peep died of an accidental drug overdose; he was managed by FAE. The rapper's mother Liza Womack filed wrongful death charges against FAE in 2019, accusing them of "negligence and other breaches of contract which, the lawsuit alleges, contributed to his death in 2017 of an accidental drugs overdose." Among the claims in the lawsuit are that FAE was complicit in providing access to "illegal drugs" and "prescription medications", and that the company knowingly allowed drug use to take place during the rapper's tour "despite being aware of his addiction". At one point, the lawsuit charges that FAE encouraged the star to take drugs. In a responding statement, FAE expressed disappointment in the lawsuit:

"Lil Peep's death from an accidental drug overdose was a terrible tragedy. However, the claim that First Access Entertainment, any of its employees, or Chase Ortega, or anyone else under our auspices, was somehow responsible for, complicit in, or contributed to his death is categorically untrue. In fact, we consistently encouraged Peep to stop abusing drugs and to distance himself from the negative influence of the drug users and enablers with whom he chose to associate."

FAE formally filed court documents at the Los Angeles County Superior Court on 23 December 2019 to dispute all claims, including claims of negligence, breach of contract, "and wrongful death". Stennett told Rolling Stone that "[she] felt very protective of Lil Peep from day one." In later documents and court filings, the company said that their work with Lil Peep was an "arm's length business arrangement", something disputed by the rapper's mother.

Despite court filings, FAE supported the release of Peep's first posthumous album Come Over When You're Sober, Pt. 2 (2018), which reached number four on the US Billboard 200 chart, a career-best for the rapper. At the start of 2020, the company released statements about their belief that they had no contractual responsibility for Lil Peep's personal life, and that a ruling to suggest so would damage management businesses, "Imposing a duty on FAE Ltd. or FAE LLC to prevent [Lil Peep's] drug overdose would extend the boundaries of legal obligations far beyond any precedent, and far beyond the contractual obligations and reasonable expectations of parties doing business. It would convert businesses engaged in the music and entertainment industries into full-time babysitters for artists. That clearly was not the parties' intent upon entering 'the JVA [(joint-venture agreement)].'"

=== Adam Lublin ===
Adam Lublin, a former executive of AEG, worked for FAE as a consultant. In 2019, he was charged with "two counts of burglary and one count of sexual abuse" at the Manhattan Criminal Court, before being charged "on a second count of sexual abuse and burglary against the first victim's roommate". The company subsequently terminated all business with Lublin.
