= Rapped in Remixes: The Greatest Hits Remixed =

Remix album by Salt-N-Pepa
- Released: April 1992
- Recorded: 1987–1992
- Genre: Electronic; hip hop; house; hip house; pop-rap
- Length: 50:03
- Label: Next Plateau Entertainment

Salt-N-Pepa chronology
The Greatest Hits (1991)	Rapped in Remixes: The Greatest Hits Remixed (1992)	Very Necessary (1993)

Rapped in Remixes: The Greatest Hits Remixed is a remix album by American hip hop trio Salt-N-Pepa. It includes remixed versions of songs taken from their three studio albums, Hot, Cool & Vicious, A Salt with a Deadly Pepa and Blacks' Magic. It is the third compilation released by the group in as many years and second remix album after their 1990 album, A Blitz of Salt-n-Pepa Hits.

== Singles ==
"Expression (Hard Ecu Edit)" was released as a single, peaking at number 23 in Ireland and the United Kingdom.

== Track listing ==
No.	Title	Writer(s)	Length
1.	"Push It" (U.S. Remix)	Hurby Azor, Ray Davies	3:29
2.	"Expression" (Hard ECU Mix)	Cheryl James	5:14
3.	"Independent" (featuring Sybil) (Brixton Bass Vocal)	Cheryl Smith, Sandra Denton	7:01
4.	"Shake Your Thang" (Club Mix)	O'Kelly Isley, Ronald Isley, Rudolph Isley	5:15
5.	"Twist and Shout"	Bert Russell, Phil Medley	3:44
6.	"Let's Talk About Sex" (True Confessions Mix)	Fingerprints, Al Bell	5:57
7.	"Do You Want Me" (Serious Mix)	Fingerprints	5:17
8.	"You Showed Me" (The Born Again Club Mix)	Gene Clark, Roger McGuinn	5:41
9.	"Tramp"	Jimmy McCracklin, Lowell Fulson, Herby Azor	3:19
10.	"The Essential Hit Combination" (Sequenced by The Commission)	Fingerprints, Gene Clark, Roger McGuinn	5:02
Total length:			50:03

=== Notes ===
- "The Essential Hit Combination" is a megamix containing "My Mic Sounds Nice", "Expression", Do You Want Me", "Let's Talk About Sex", and "You Showed Me".

== Charts ==
Chart performance for Rapped in Remixes: The Greatest Hits Remixed
Chart (1992)	Peak position
UK Albums (OCC)	37

== Personnel ==
Remixes

- Cameron Paul (track 1)
- Ben Liebrand (track 2, 6, 8)
- Blacksmith (track 3)
