= The Greatest Hits (Salt-n-Pepa album) =

Greatest hits album by Salt-N-Pepa
- Released: October 7, 1991
- Genre: Hip hop
- Length: 55:14
- Label: FFRR; Next Plateau
- Producer: Hurby Luv Bug; The Invincibles

Salt-N-Pepa chronology
A Blitz of Salt-N-Pepa Hits: The Hits Remixed (1990)	The Greatest Hits (1991)	Rapped in Remixes: The Greatest Hits Remixed (1992)

Professional ratings
Review scores
Source	Rating
NME	8/10

The Greatest Hits is the first greatest hits album by American hip hop group Salt-N-Pepa. It was released on October 7, 1991, by FFRR Records and Next Plateau Entertainment. The album was certified Platinum in the United Kingdom.

== Track listing ==
1. "Push It" – 3:30 (from Hot, Cool & Vicious)
2. "Expression" (Brixton Bass Edit) – 3:31 (from Rapped in Remixes: The Greatest Hits Remixed)
3. "Independent" (Independent Funk Vocal) – 4:48 (from Blacks' Magic)
4. "Shake Your Thang" (It's Your Thing) – 3:59 (from A Salt with a Deadly Pepa)
5. "Twist and Shout" – 3:48 (from A Salt with a Deadly Pepa)
6. "Let's Talk About Sex" – 3:30 (from Blacks' Magic)
7. "I Like It Like That" – 4:07 (from A Salt with a Deadly Pepa)
8. "Tramp" – 3:20 (from Hot, Cool & Vicious)
9. "Do You Want Me" (Remix) – 3:18 (from Blacks' Magic)
10. "My Mic Sounds Nice" – 4:11 (from Hot, Cool & Vicious)
11. "I'll Take Your Man" – 5:06 (from Hot, Cool & Vicious)
12. "I Gotcha" – 3:53 (from A Salt with a Deadly Pepa)
13. "I Am Down" – 4:13 (B-side to "Push It" single)
14. "You Showed Me" (The Born Again Mix) – 3:23

== Personnel ==
- Producer: Hurby Luv Bug (tracks 1, 5–13) and The Invincibles (tracks 4–6, 7, 9, 12)

== Charts ==
=== Weekly charts ===
Weekly chart performance for The Greatest Hits
Chart (1991–1992)	Peak position
Australian Albums (ARIA)	2
Austrian Albums (Ö3 Austria)	7
Dutch Albums (Album Top 100)	20
European Albums (Music & Media)	20
Finnish Albums (Suomen virallinen lista)	27
German Albums (Offizielle Top 100)	10
New Zealand Albums (RMNZ)	6
Swedish Albums (Sverigetopplistan)	44
Swiss Albums (Schweizer Hitparade)	13
UK Albums (OCC)	6

=== Year-end charts ===
1991 year-end chart performance for The Greatest Hits
Chart (1991)	Position
UK Albums (OCC)	50

1992 year-end chart performance for The Greatest Hits
Chart (1992)	Position
Australian Albums (ARIA)	23
Austrian Albums (Ö3 Austria)	28
European Albums (Music & Media)	70
German Albums (Offizielle Top 100)	43
New Zealand Albums (RMNZ)	47
Swiss Albums (Schweizer Hitparade)	36

== Certifications ==
Certifications for The Greatest Hits
Region	Certification	Certified units/sales
Australia (ARIA)	Platinum	70,000^{^}
Austria (IFPI Austria)	Gold	25,000^{*}
New Zealand (RMNZ)	Gold	7,500^{^}
Switzerland (IFPI Switzerland)	Gold	25,000^{^}
United Kingdom (BPI)	Platinum	300,000^{^}
^{*} Sales figures based on certification alone.^{^} Shipments figures based on certification alone.
