= The Spinnin Tour =

2024 concert tour by Madison Beer

- Tour by Madison Beer
- Location: Europe; North America; Asia; Oceania
- Associated album: Silence Between Songs
- Start date: February 24, 2024
- End date: September 2, 2024
- No. of shows: 63
- Supporting acts: Jann; Charlotte Lawrence; Upsahl; Jillian Rossi; Ellise; Destiny Rogers; Neriah; Kita Alexander

Madison Beer concert chronology
- The Life Support Tour (2021–2022); The Spinnin Tour (2024); The Locket Tour (2026)

The Spinnin Tour was the third concert tour by American singer-songwriter Madison Beer in support of her sophomore second studio album, Silence Between Songs (2023). It began on February 24, 2024, in Stockholm, with shows across Europe, North America, Asia and Oceania. It concluded in Melbourne on September 2nd, 2024, comprising 63 shows. Jann, Charlotte Lawrence, Upsahl, Jillian Rossi, Ellise, Destiny Rogers, Neriah, and Kita Alexander served as opening acts.

== Background ==
On October 9, 2023, Beer announced a 52-date European & North American tour, titled The Spinnin Tour. The Spinnin Tour is Beer's third concert tour, and follows her sophomore tour, The Life Support Tour, which she embarked on in 2021 and 2022, in support of her debut studio album Life Support. Alongside the announcement of the tour, it has been revealed that there would have been an artist presale going on sale on October 10, 2023 with the general sale going on sale on October 13, 2023.

On October 11, 2023 Beer announced that the venue for the Vancouver show had been upgraded, due to age restrictions at the previous venue. On October 13, 2023, a venue upgrade for the Warsaw and Oslo dates were announced due to "overwhelming demand". On November 1, 2023, Beer announced 4 additional dates across Europe due to "demand". On January 29, 2024 Beer was announced as a performer at the LaLaLa festival in Jakarta, Indonesia. On June 26, 2024 Beer announced Asia and Oceania dates as the encore for the tour.

== Set list ==
The following set list is obtained from the April 24, 2024 show in Minneapolis. It is not intended to represent all dates throughout the tour.

1. "Home to Another One"
2. "Good in Goodbye"
3. "Sweet Relief"
4. "Showed Me (How I Fell in Love with You)"
5. "17"
6. "I Wonder"
7. "Silence Between Songs"
8. "Dear Society"
9. "Nothing Matters But You"
10. "Envy the Leaves"
11. "Stained Glass"
12. ”Homesick”
13. "Selfish"
14. "At Your Worst"
15. "Ryder"
16. ”Dangerous”
17. "Reckless"
18. "Make You Mine"
19. "Boyshit"
20. "Baby"
21. "Heartless" (Interlude)
22. "Follow the White Rabbit"

Encore

23. "Spinnin"
24. "King of Everything"

Spinnin Tour Encore from August 28, 2024 in Brisbane, Australia.

1. "Home to Another One"
2. "Good in Goodbye"
3. "Sweet Relief"
4. "Showed Me (How I Fell in Love with You)"
5. "17"
6. "I Wonder"
7. "Silence Between Songs"
8. "Dear Society"
9. "Nothing Matters But You"
10. "Envy the Leaves"
11. "Stained Glass"
12. ”Homesick”
13. "Selfish"
14. "Ryder"
15. ”Dangerous”
16. "Reckless"
17. "Make You Mine"
18. "15 Minutes"
19. "Boyshit"
20. "Baby"
21. "Heartless" (Interlude)
22. "Follow the White Rabbit"

Encore

23. "Spinnin"
24. "King of Everything"

== Shows ==
List of concerts, showing date, city, country, venue and opening acts, attendance and gross revenue
Dates (2024)	City	Country	Venue	Opening act(s)	Attendance	Revenue
February 24	Stockholm	Sweden	Fryshuset Arenan	Jann; Jillian Rossi	—N/a	—N/a
February 25 (Note: The venue for this show was upgraded from Rockefeller following high demand.)	Oslo	Norway	Sentrum Scene	Jann; Jillian Rossi	—N/a	—N/a
February 28	Brussels	Belgium	Ancienne Belgique	Jann; Jillian Rossi	1,982 / 1,995	$76,800
February 29	Amsterdam	Netherlands	AFAS Live	Jann; Jillian Rossi	—N/a	—N/a
March 1	Luxembourg	Luxembourg	Den Atelier	Jann; Jillian Rossi	—N/a	—N/a
March 3	Cologne	Germany	Palladium	Jann; Jillian Rossi	—N/a	—N/a
March 5 (Note: The venue for this show was upgraded from Progresja following high demand.)	Warsaw	Poland	Arena COS Torwar	Jann; Jillian Rossi	—N/a	—N/a
March 7	Munich	Germany	TonHalle	Jann; Jillian Rossi	—N/a	—N/a
March 9	Vienna	Austria	Gasometer	Jann; Jillian Rossi	—N/a	—N/a
March 10	Prague	Czech Republic	SaSaZu	Jann; Jillian Rossi	—N/a	—N/a
March 12	Zürich	Switzerland	X-Tra	Jann; Jillian Rossi	—N/a	—N/a
March 13	Milan	Italy	Fabrique	Jann; Jillian Rossi	—N/a	—N/a
March 16	Barcelona	Spain	Razzmatazz	Jann; Jillian Rossi	—N/a	—N/a
March 17	Madrid	Spain	Palacio Vistalegre	Jann; Jillian Rossi	—N/a	—N/a
March 20	Paris	France	Zénith	Jann; Jillian Rossi	—N/a	—N/a
March 22	Manchester	England	O2 Victoria Warehouse	Jann; Jillian Rossi	—N/a	—N/a
March 23	Birmingham	England	O2 Academy Birmingham	Jann; Jillian Rossi	—N/a	—N/a
March 24	Glasgow	Scotland	O2 Academy Glasgow	Jann; Jillian Rossi	—N/a	—N/a
March 25	London	England	Eventim Apollo	Jann; Jillian Rossi	—N/a	—N/a
March 28	Leeds	England	O2 Academy Leeds	Jann; Jillian Rossi	—N/a	—N/a
March 29	Liverpool	England	University Mountford Hall	Jann; Jillian Rossi	—N/a	—N/a
March 31	Dublin	Ireland	3Arena	Jann; Jillian Rossi	3,936 / 4,920	$225,732
April 2	London	England	Eventim Apollo	Jann; Jillian Rossi	—N/a	—N/a
April 24	Minneapolis	United States	The Fillmore	Charlotte Lawrence; Ellise	—N/a	—N/a
April 26	Chicago	United States	Riviera Theatre	Charlotte Lawrence; Ellise	—N/a	—N/a
April 27	St. Louis	United States	The Pageant	Charlotte Lawrence; Ellise	—N/a	—N/a
April 28	Nashville	United States	Ryman Auditorium	Charlotte Lawrence; Ellise	—N/a	—N/a
April 30	Cincinnati	United States	Andrew J. Brady Music Center	Charlotte Lawrence; Ellise	—N/a	—N/a
May 1	Indianapolis	United States	Egyptian Room	Charlotte Lawrence; Ellise	—N/a	—N/a
May 3	Detroit	United States	The Fillmore Detroit	Charlotte Lawrence; Ellise	—N/a	—N/a
May 4	McKees Rocks	United States	Roxian Theatre	Charlotte Lawrence; Ellise	—N/a	—N/a
May 7	Charlotte	United States	The Fillmore	Charlotte Lawrence; Ellise	—N/a	—N/a
May 8	Raleigh	United States	The Ritz	Charlotte Lawrence; Ellise	—N/a	—N/a
May 10	Washington, D.C.	United States	Echostage	Charlotte Lawrence; Ellise	—N/a	—N/a
May 11	Boston	United States	MGM Music Hall at Fenway	Charlotte Lawrence; Ellise	4,698 / 4,977	$184,338
May 14	Montreal	Canada	M Telus	Charlotte Lawrence; Destiny Rogers	—N/a	—N/a
May 15	Toronto	Canada	History	Charlotte Lawrence; Destiny Rogers	—N/a	—N/a
May 17	Philadelphia	United States	The Fillmore Philadelphia	Charlotte Lawrence; Destiny Rogers	—N/a	—N/a
May 18	New York City	United States	Radio City Music Hall	Charlotte Lawrence; Destiny Rogers	5,916 / 5,916	$368,303
May 20	Atlanta	United States	Tabernacle	Upsahl; Destiny Rogers	—N/a	—N/a
May 22	St. Petersburg	United States	Jannus Live	Upsahl; Destiny Rogers	—N/a	—N/a
May 23	Fort Lauderdale	United States	Hard Rock Live	Upsahl; Destiny Rogers	—N/a	—N/a
May 25	New Orleans	United States	The Fillmore	Upsahl; Destiny Rogers	—N/a	—N/a
May 26	Houston	United States	Bayou Music Center	Upsahl; Destiny Rogers	—N/a	—N/a
May 28	Austin	United States	Stubb's Waller Creek Amphitheater	Upsahl; Destiny Rogers	—N/a	—N/a
May 29	Dallas	United States	South Side Ballroom	Upsahl; Destiny Rogers	—N/a	—N/a
May 31	Phoenix	United States	The Van Buren	Upsahl; Neriah	—N/a	—N/a
June 2	Denver	United States	Fillmore Auditorium	Upsahl; Neriah	—N/a	—N/a
June 4	Salt Lake City	United States	The Complex	Upsahl; Neriah	—N/a	—N/a
June 5	Las Vegas	United States	Brooklyn Bowl	Upsahl; Neriah	—N/a	—N/a
June 7	Portland	United States	Crystal Ballroom	Upsahl; Neriah	—N/a	—N/a
June 8	Seattle	United States	Moore Theatre	Upsahl; Neriah	—N/a	—N/a
June 9 (Note: The venue for this show was upgraded from Commodore Ballroom.)	Vancouver	Canada	Queen Elizabeth Theatre	Upsahl; Neriah	—N/a	—N/a
June 11	San Francisco	United States	SF Masonic Auditorium	Upsahl; Neriah	—N/a	—N/a
June 12	San Diego	United States	SOMA	Upsahl; Neriah	—N/a	—N/a
June 13	Los Angeles	United States	Greek Theatre	Upsahl; Neriah	—N/a	—N/a
August 17 (Note: Part of Summer Sonic Festival.)	Chiba (Note: Labelled as Tokyo in promotion material.)	Japan	Makuhari Messe	—N/a	—N/a	—N/a
August 18	Osaka	Japan	Expo Commemoration Park	—N/a	—N/a	—N/a
August 22	Singapore		Arena @ Expo	Rriley	—N/a	—N/a
August 24 (Note: Part of LaLaLa Festival.)	Jakarta	Indonesia	Jakarta International Expo	—N/a	—N/a	—N/a
August 28	Brisbane	Australia	Fortitude Music Hall	Kita Alexander	—N/a	—N/a
August 30	Sydney	Australia	Hordern Pavilion	Kita Alexander	—N/a	—N/a
September 2	Melbourne	Australia	Margaret Court Arena	Kita Alexander	—N/a	—N/a
Total					16,532 / 17,808 (92.83%)	$855,173

== Notes ==
Show details
