= A Blitz of Salt-N-Pepa Hits =

A Blitz Of Salt-N-Pepa Hits

Remix album by Salt-N-Pepa
- Released: November 1990
- Recorded: 1987–1990
- Genres: Electronic; hip hop; house; pop-rap
- Length: 45:37
- Label: Next Plateau

Salt-N-Pepa chronology
Blacks' Magic (1990)	A Blitz Of Salt-N-Pepa Hits (1990)	The Greatest Hits (1991)

Professional ratings
Review scores
Source	Rating
AllMusic	2/5 stars
Calgary Herald	C

A Blitz of Salt-N-Pepa Hits: The Hits Remixed is the first compilation album by American hip hop trio Salt-N-Pepa. It includes re-mixed versions of songs taken from their three studio albums, Hot, Cool & Vicious, A Salt with a Deadly Pepa and Blacks' Magic. The album has been certified platinum in Canada.

== Review ==
Stephen Thomas Erlewine of AllMusic wrote: "As remix albums go, Salt-N-Pepa's is fine, but their hit singles lose a bit of their magic in these extended forms."

== Track listing ==
No.	Title	Writer(s)	Length
1.	"Do You Want Me" (European Remix)	Hurby Azor	5:58
2.	"Push It" (U.K. Remix)	Hurby Azor, Ray Davies	5:08
3.	"Expression" (Brixton Remix)	Cheryl James	4:50
4.	"Independent (feat Sybil" (Brixton Remix)	Cheryl Smith, Sandra Denton	4:06
5.	"Shake Your Thang (feat E.U.)" (Luv Bug Re-Edit)	O'Kelly Isley, Ronald Isley, Rudolph Isley	4:00
6.	"Let's Talk About Sex" (Luv Bug Remix)	Fingerprints, Al Bell	4:43
7.	"Tramp" (Luv Bug Remix)	Jimmy McCracklin, Lowell Fulson, Herby Azor	3:17
8.	"My Mic Sounds Nice" (45 King Remix)	Hurby Azor	4:57
9.	"I'll Take Your Man" (Quicksilver Re-Edit)	George Clinton, Bootsy Collins, Bernie Worrell, Hurby Azor	5:05
10.	"Get Up Everybody (Get Up)" (Steevee-O Remix)	Hurby Azor	3:36

== Credits ==
- Mastered at The Hit Factory
- Mastered by Herb Powers Jr.

== Charts ==
Chart performance for A Blitz of Salt-N-Pepa Hits
Chart (1991–1992)	Peak position
Australian Albums (ARIA)	104
Canada Top Albums/CDs (RPM)	23
UK Albums (Official Charts)	70
US Top R&B/Hip-Hop Albums (Billboard)	63

== Certifications ==
Certifications for A Blitz of Salt-N-Pepa Hits
Region	Certification	Certified units/sales
Canada (Music Canada)	Platinum	100,000^{^}
^{^} Shipments figures based on certification alone.
