= Pusher =

Pusher may refer to:

== Film and television ==
- Pusher (film series), a trilogy by the Danish director Nicolas Winding Refn
  - Pusher (1996 film), the first film in the series
- Pusher (2012 film), a British remake of the 1996 film, directed by Luis Prieto
- The Pusher (film), a 1958 American film directed by Gene Milford, based on an Ed McBain novel
- Pushers (TV series), a 2025 British comedy series created by Rosie Jones and Peter Fellows
- "Pusher" (The X-Files), a television episode
- Pusher, a fictional type of telepathic character in the 2009 film Push

== Music ==
- Pusher (musician), Canadian musician
- "The Pusher", a 1968 song by Steppenwolf, written by Hoyt Axton
- "Pusher", a song by Nickelback from the album Curb, 1996
- The Pusher (band), a Swedish pop group
- Pusher, a 2018 album by Dani M

== Sports and games ==
- Pusher (tennis), a type of defensive tennis player
- Pusher game, a type of medal game
- Pusher, a stick used to play underwater hockey
- Pusher, a 1994 game manufactured by Peri Spiele
- Pusher, a 2002 video game published by JoWooD

== Transport ==
- Pusher (boat), a vessel designed for pushing barges or car floats
- Pusher configuration, an aircraft configuration
- Pusher engine, or bank engine, a type of railway locomotive
- Passenger pusher, a worker who helps people board mass transit vehicles at crowded stops

== Other uses ==
- Pusher centrifuge, a filtration technique
- Tool pusher, or just pusher, the manager of an oil rig
- Pusher, a dealer in the illegal drug trade
- Pusher, a layer in nuclear weapon design
