= Mothica =

American singer (born 1995)

- Also known as: Mothica
- Born: McKenzie Ashton Ellis; March 12, 1995 (age 31); Oklahoma City, Oklahoma, U.S.
- Origin: Oklahoma City
- Genres: Pop punk; alternative rock; electropop; emo; alternative metal
- Occupations: Singer
- Years active: 2014–present
- Labels: Heavy Heart; Rise; SharpTone
- Website: mothica.com

McKenzie Ashton Ellis (born March 12, 1995), known professionally as Mothica, is an American singer. She grew up in Oklahoma City and began producing music when she was 18 years old. Since 2015, she has produced a dozen albums and singles distributed across several online musical streaming platforms such as on Spotify, SoundCloud and Bandcamp. In June 2020, a TikTok video she posted that included her song "VICES" went viral, providing greater notability as a musician and singer.

== Early life ==
Mothica was born McKenzie Ellis on March 12, 1995. She grew up in Oklahoma City. Having experienced depression and engaged in self-harm, she turned to online communities after finding that expressing her struggles in her hometown was taboo.

Ellis has been a victim of assault and domestic abuse. On January 29, 2011, she attempted suicide.

Although she wrote music as a child, Ellis did not want to be a musician by profession. She began producing music for public release when she was 18 years old. She attended Harding Fine Arts Academy before receiving a scholarship from Pratt Institute for visual web programming, leading her to move to Brooklyn in 2013. In her first year at Pratt Institute, a classmate introduced her to SoundCloud and lent her a MIDI keyboard.

=== Stage name ===
Ellis adopted the name "Mothica" for her music and visual art at age 15 in reference to the tendency of moths to be attracted to light.

== Career ==
Mothica's first song, "Starchild", was played 100,000 times in 24 hours after she released it on SoundCloud. After learning to produce songs in Ableton, she released an EP titled Mythic in 2015. The song “No One” from the EP reached No. 6 on the U.S. Viral Spotify Charts.

In 2020, she began promoting her music on TikTok, later attributing the success of her music career to the app. She has more than 500,000 followers on TikTok where she shares openly about her experiences with depression as well as sobriety and hair loss.

In June 2020, Mothica released a song titled "VICES" which reached No. 2 on the iTunes popular music charts, surpassing "Watermelon Sugar" by Harry Styles. The song also charted on the Billboard charts and received more than 5,000,000 views and almost 1,000,000 likes. In August 2020, she released a 12-song album titled "Blue Hour" which autobiographically discussed her progress toward sobriety; the album also charted. She subsequently released an EP titled "Forever Fifteen" in March 2021. In July 2022, she released her second studio album, "Nocturnal".

In 2021, she and DeathbyRomy were featured by Ellise on the track "Soul Sucker pt 2".

In November 2022, Mothica was featured on Scene Queen's song "The Rapture (But it's Pink)".

In March 2024, Mothica announced that her third album Kissing Death would be released in August 2024.

In November 2025, Mothica signed to Sharp Tone records.

=== Musical style ===
Mothica's pop music is influenced by rock and emo. Mothica has technically described her earliest songs such as in the Mythic EP as "bummer pop" and dream pop.

== Personal life ==
Ellis has numerous tattoos, not limited to the following: Her first was a geometric cube tattooed on the back of her neck, motivated at the time by enjoyment of architecture and minimalism. She has a sleeve tattoo on her right arm that includes a flying hawk impaled by an arrow as well as the skull of a ram and a fern leaf. She has a tattoo on her back inspired by the painting Lucretia, and tattoos of her song titles: "oblivion", "chaos", "heavy heart", "NOW", and "VICES". She also has a tattoo of three moths around a lamppost.

Mothica moved to Los Angeles in 2019 for her career in music, but moved back into her parents' home in Oklahoma City during the COVID-19 pandemic. Her mother Debbie Ellis, also known as "Momica," has assisted her with the production of music videos.

In October 2024, Mothica apologetically called off her U.S. tour to attend rehab for pill addiction, returning to recording and performing in 2025.

== Discography ==
=== Studio albums ===
List of albums
Name	Release date
Blue Hour	August 27, 2020
Nocturnal	July 1, 2022
Kissing Death	August 23, 2024

=== Extended plays ===
List of EPs
Name	Release date
Mythic	December 15, 2015
Out of IT (Remixes)	February 15, 2017
Heavy Heart	May 31, 2017
Ashes	November 9, 2018
Ashes (Remixed)	February 1, 2019
forever fifteen	March 19, 2021
Nocturnal (lofi beats to fall asleep to)	August 25, 2022
Somewhere in Between	February 20, 2026

=== Singles ===
List of Singles
Year	Name	Album/EP
2014	"Molt" (with Bearface)	Non-album single
2017	"Self-Destructive"	Heavy Heart
2017	"Sometimes"	Heavy Heart
2018	"Lovetalk"	Non-album single
2018	"Water Me Down"	Ashes
2018	"Burnout"	Ashes
2019	"By Now..." (Brown Whale Remix)	Ashes (Remixed)
2019	"Love Me Better"	Non-album single
2019	"NOW"	Blue Hour
2019	"Hungover"	Blue Hour
2020	"oh god"	Blue Hour
2020	"R.I.F.P."	Blue Hour
2020	"Hands Off"	Blue Hour
2020	"everything at once"	Blue Hour
2020	"VICES"	Blue Hour
2020	"VICES (Remixes)"	Non-album single
2021	"forever fifteen"	forever fifteen
2021	"forever fifteen (acoustic)"	Non-album singles
2021	"Can You Feel My Heart" (Mothica version)	Non-album singles
2021	"buzzkill" (feat. Brassie & Tokiejoestar)	Non-album singles
2021	"Heavy Heart"	Non-album singles
2022	"CASUALTY"	Nocturnal
2022	"GOOD FOR HER" (with emlyn)	Non-album single
2022	"SENSITIVE"	Nocturnal
2022	Last Cigarette (feat. Au/Ra)	Nocturnal
2022	"BEDTIME STORIES / BLOOD"	Nocturnal
2023	"Glow in the Dark" (From Rocksmith+ Original Soundtrack)	Non-album singles
2023	"Sirens" (feat. Sophie Powers)	Non-album singles
2024	"Doomed"	Kissing Death
2024	"Curiosity Killed the Moth"	Kissing Death
2024	"Red"	Kissing Death
2024	"The Reaper"	Kissing Death
2024	"Toxins"	Kissing Death
2024	"Mirage"	Kissing Death
2024	"Afterlife"	Kissing Death
2025	"Toxins (remix)"	Non-album singles
2025	"VICES II"	Non-album singles
2025	"Evergreen Misery"	Somewhere In Between
2026	"Save Your Roses"	Somewhere In Between
2026	"My Confession"	TBA

As guest performer
Year	Name	Album/EP
2016	"Clear" (Pusher and MOTHICA)	Clear
2016	"Clear" (Graves remix) (Pusher, MOTHICA and Graves)	Clear
2016	"Clear" (Shawn Wasabi remix) (Pusher, MOTHICA and Shawn Wasabi)	Clear
2016	"Clear" (Lh4l remix) (Pusher, MOTHICA and Lh4L)	Clear
2016	"Clear" (Patrickreza remix) (Pusher, MOTHICA and PatrickReza)	Clear
2016	"Reputation" (Icarus Moth and MOTHICA)	Non-album singles
2018	"Chasing Light" {MEMBA and MOTHICA)	Non-album singles
2018	"Don't" (Icarus Moth and MOTHICA)	Non-album singles
2019	"Chasing Lights (Pt. 2)" (MEMBA and MOTHICA)	Non-album singles
2020	"Overthinking" (Mickey Valen and MOTHICA)	Non-album singles
2021	"upside down (Mothica Remix)" (nothing,nowhere. and MOTHICA)	Non-album singles
2021	"Soul Sucker, Pt. 2" (Ellise, DeathbyRomy and MOTHICA)	Non-album singles
2022	"The Rapture (But It's Pink)" Scene Queen and MOTHICA	BIMBOCORE VOL. 2
2024	"REPTILIAN" PVRIS and MOTHICA	F.I.L.T.H.
