= Melodic (magazine) =

Music review website

- Website type: Music webzine
- Owners: Pär Winberg; Johan Wippsson
- Creator: Pär Winberg
- Website: melodic.net
- Launched: 1999; 27 years ago
- Current status: Active

Melodic is an international daily Internet publication devoted to music criticism and commentary, music news, and artist interviews. Its focus is on independent music. However, the range of musical genres covered extends to rock, pop, folk, jazz, heavy metal, electronic, and experimental music.

The site, which was established in 1999, concentrates on new music, but Melodic journalists also review reissued albums and box sets. The site also publishes "best-of" lists as annual features detailing the best albums of each year.

== History ==
The website was created in Skogås, Sweden in 1999 with the name of Midwestern Skies. It was founded by the music industrialist Pär Winberg, which had been an A&R executive and had worked for EMI Music Sweden and Lionheart Music Group. He also worked with several artists, including The Real Group and Robert Wells. Melodic publishes content from contributors located around the globe, based in different continents and countries.

In May 2002, Midwestern Skies moved to the domain Melodic.net. The following year, the site expanded to competitions, features, and columns. In 2006, several features began to be provided by the site's staff writers, including live reviews, interviews, exclusive MP3 streams, and year-end features. In 2011, Melodic presented readers choice awards in ten categories. Swedish rock band The Pusher received three awards for their debut album The Art of Hit Music. Other winners were The Anix, Miss Behaviour, Nickelback, Coury Palermo, Sixx:A.M., Infinita Symphonia, and Brad Byrd. In January 2012, Melodic announced a new chart which is based on readers' vote. Charts are announced on Monday mornings and feature fifteen tracks.

The website had a complete make-over in 2020 and currently features the latest music news, interviews, record reviews, live shows, music videos as well as competitions.

== Rating system ==
Melodic operates a simple 5-star rating system, starting at 1, that allows .5 intervals. Each of these values is assigned a word, ranging from "Terrible" (1.0) to "Essential" (5.0).

As well as showing the score a reviewer has given to the album, a review page will also show the average rating given by the readers. Should enough users have rated the album, a bar chart will also be shown indicating how many votes each rating has.
