= None of Your Business =

1994 single by Salt-n-Pepa

Single by Salt-N-Pepa

from the album Very Necessary
- Released: August 30, 1994
- Genre: Dance-pop; hip hop
- Length: 3:32 (album version)
- Label: Next Plateau
- Songwriter: Hurby Azor
- Producer: Azor

Salt-N-Pepa singles chronology
| "Whatta Man" (1993) | "None of Your Business" (1994) | "Heaven 'n Hell" (1994) |

"None of Your Business" is the third single from American hip hop group Salt-n-Pepa's fourth studio album, Very Necessary (1994), released in August 1994 by Next Plateau. Written and produced by Hurby Azor, the song earned the group its first Grammy Award. It is included on the 1996 Barb Wire and 2000 Miss Congeniality soundtracks.

== Critical reception ==
Dave Jennings from Melody Maker wrote, "'None of Your Business' is dance pop with muscle, brains and hormones; the three great women loudly and unequivocally demanding their right to shag whom they like when they like without anyone else imagining that they're entitled to pass comment. Rarely in the history of pop can interfering moralists have been told to f*** off quite so eloquently and enjoyable. A splendidly slinky synth line adds further spring to the single's sharp step." Alan Jones from Music Week commented, "A rap/metal hybrid that has no problem appealing to the head nodding, air guitar crowd, as the girls are carried along on fat guitar riffs. The Perfecto remix miraculously returns the girls to their dance roots, making this truly a barrier-buster."

Terry Staunton from NME said that "overall this is another top notch record, although not quite in the same league as 'Whatta Man'." James Hamilton from the Record Mirror Dance Update described it as "jauntily chanted but really quite hard rolling wordy rap" in his weekly dance column. Leesa Daniels from Smash Hits gave "None of Your Business" a score of four out of five, writing, "This is a classic rap tune with the girls telling everyone that they're doing what they're doing what they want, and if you don't like then tough pooh! It's a tough track with a stomping beat and well 'ard lyrics. Hurrah for the divas of rap!"

== Awards ==
"None of Your Business" was nominated for 'Best Dance Video' and 'Best Choreography' at the 1995 MTV Video Music Awards, but lost out to Scream by Michael Jackson and Janet Jackson for both awards.

"None of Your Business" was nominated and won the award for Best Rap Performance by a Duo or Group at the 37th Annual Grammy Awards. Prior to the win, the group had been nominated for this award twice; in 1989 with "Push It" and 1992 with "Let's Talk About Sex".

Cheryl later 'disowned that song for its sexually salacious content', was at that stage so unwell, that the win was merely a 'hollow triumph'. "It was exciting on one level, but all I remember of that time was, I was severely bulimic and caught up in the whole 'skinny is beautiful' thing, and I felt so empty when I should have been elated, I suppose." "My career was peaking at the same time my personal life was at an all time low. You always think when you're young that success is measured in these certain terms, but the reality is a Grammy's never gonna fill the void I felt when I was bulimic."

== Impact ==
In a 20-year review of the track, Sarah Oakes of Daily Life said the song has "aged far more like a good wine than the alcopop that got you on the dance floor in the first place." She continued "'None Of Your Business' is a fist-pumping, anti slut-shaming anthem a solid decade before the term was ever used in the mainstream. It is a war cry for women against the people and institutions that judge them for having sex, enjoying sex or expressing their sexuality with an I-do-not-give-a-shit attitude that is as infectious as its bass line. I feel like if 'None Of Your Business' was released today, it would go viral in an instant. What makes Salt N Pepa so bold is that they independently chose to flip the script. They behaved like they were as empowered as the male rappers. They wore sexy clothing, talked about enjoying casual sex, they objectified men, and across many tracks directly addressed the way women were/are shamed for promiscuous behaviours." Oakes concluded with, "On the 20th anniversary of their Grammy for 'None Of Your Business', I don't think it's an overstatement to call these women visionaries and we need more like them."

== Track listings and formats ==
- CD-maxi – double A-side single (with Heaven 'n Hell)
1. "None of Your Business" (Muggs Metal Mix) – 3:36
2. "None of Your Business" (Perfecto Mix) – 3:24
3. "Shoop" (Ben Liebrand Mix) – 3:59
4. "Heaven 'n Hell" (Carron Hall Mix) – 4:19
- CD-maxi – remixes
1. "None of Your Business" (Perfecto Radio Mix) – 3:23
2. "None of Your Business" (Muggs Mix) – 4:00
3. "None of Your Business" (Ghetto Lab Mix) – 4:23
4. "None of Your Business" (Album Mix) – 3:32

== Charts ==
Chart performance for "None of Your Business"
| Chart (1994) | Peak position |
|---|---|
| Australia (ARIA) | 53 |
| Europe (European Dance Radio) | 17 |
| Germany (GfK) | 82 |
| Ireland (IRMA) | 26 |
| Netherlands (Dutch Top 40 Tipparade) | 14 |
| Netherlands (Single Top 100) | 40 |
| Scotland Singles (Official Charts) | 19 |
| Switzerland (Schweizer Hitparade) | 29 |
| UK Singles (Official Charts) | 19 |
| UK Dance (Official Charts) | 27 |
| UK Club Chart (Music Week) | 90 |
| US Billboard Hot 100 | 32 |
| US Dance Singles Sales (Billboard) | 18 |
| US Hot R&B/Hip-Hop Songs (Billboard) | 57 |
| US Rhythmic Airplay (Billboard) | 22 |

== Cover version ==
During the closing credits of the Bob's Burgers season 9 episode 4, "Nightmare on Ocean Avenue Street", the Belcher children sing the song with new lyrics that focus on eating Halloween candy.
