= Heaven 'n Hell =

1994 single by Salt-n-Pepa

"Heaven 'N Hell"

Single by Salt-n-Pepa

from the album Very Necessary
- B-side: "Let's Talk About AIDS"
- Released: July 25, 1994
- Length: 4:43 (album version)
- Label: Next Plateau; London
- Songwriters: Hurby Azor; Mike Oliver; Steve Azor
- Producers: Hurby Azor; Salt-n-Pepa

Salt-n-Pepa singles chronology
"None of Your Business" (1994)	"Heaven 'N Hell" (1994)	"Ain't Nuthin' but a She Thing" (1995)

Music video
- "Heaven 'N Hell" on YouTube

"Heaven 'N Hell" is the fourth and final single released from American hip hop group Salt-n-Pepa's fourth studio album, Very Necessary (1993). In the United States, it was released alongside "None of Your Business" as a double-A sided single. The song samples "Think About It" by Odell Brown & the Organ-izers, "Synthetic Substitution" by Melvin Bliss and "Heaven and Hell is on Earth" by 20th Century Steel Band. "Heaven 'N Hell" became a top-30 hit in Australia and New Zealand. The accompanying music video was directed by American film and music video director Marcus Raboy and filmed in New York. Victoria Strange produced it.

== Track listing ==
- Australasian CD single
1. "Heaven 'N Hell" (remix)
2. "Let's Talk About AIDS"
3. "Shoop" (Ghetto Lab radio edit)
4. "Heaven 'N Hell" (Carron Hall Mix)

== Charts ==
Chart (1994)	Peak position
Australia (ARIA)	21
New Zealand (Recorded Music NZ)	27
