= Very Necessary =

Studio album by Salt-N-Pepa
- Released: October 12, 1993
- Recorded: 1992–1993
- Studios: Sound Trek (New York City) (Note: Tracks 1–10 and 13); Power Play (Queens, New York) (Note: Tracks 1–3, 5, 6 and 8–10); Royal (Note: Track 5); Bayside (Queens, New York) (Note: Tracks 6, 8 and 9); Hillside Sound (Englewood, New Jersey) (Note: Track 11)
- Genres: Hip hop; pop rap
- Length: 58:44
- Labels: Next Plateau; London
- Producers: Herby "Luvbug" Azor; Steve Azor; Sandra "Pepa" Denton; DJ Wynn; Cheryl "Salt" James; De De "Spinderella" Roper; Tommy "D.J. Grand" Shannon; WEATOC, Inc.

Salt-N-Pepa chronology
Rapped in Remixes: The Greatest Hits Remixed (1992)	Very Necessary (1993)	Brand New (1997)

Singles from Very Necessary
- 1. "Shoop" Released: September 21, 1993; 2. "Whatta Man" Released: December 2, 1993; 3. "None of Your Business" Released: August 30, 1994; 4. "Heaven 'n Hell" Released: 1994

Professional ratings
Review scores
Source	Rating
AllMusic	4/5 stars
Christgau's Consumer Guide	(3-star Honorable Mention)
Los Angeles Times	2.5/4 stars
Pitchfork	8.5/10

Very Necessary is the fourth studio album by American hip hop group Salt-N-Pepa, released on October 12, 1993, by Next Plateau Records and London Records. As the group's last album to feature writing and production from their manager and primary producer Hurby Azor, it spawned four singles, including "Shoop" (their first top-five single on the Billboard Hot 100, peaking at number four), "Whatta Man" (featuring En Vogue, their second-highest-peaking single at number three), and "None of Your Business", which earned the group their first Grammy Award, in the category Best Rap Performance by a Duo or Group.

Very Necessary peaked at number four on the Billboard 200, and has been certified five-times platinum by the Recording Industry Association of America (RIAA), denoting sales of over five million copies in the United States. It is the highest-selling album from the group.

== Track listing ==
No.	Title	Writer(s)	Producer(s)	Length
1.	"Groove Me" (featuring Styowlz)	Hurby Azor; Dave Kelly; Anthony Williams	Herby "Luvbug" Azor	4:21
2.	"No One Does It Better"	H. Azor; Williams	H. Azor	3:53
3.	"Somebody's Gettin' on My Nerves"	H. Azor; Steve Azor; Williams	H. Azor; S. Azor^{[a]}	3:57
4.	"Whatta Man" (with En Vogue)	H. Azor; Dave Crawford	Azor	5:07
5.	"None of Your Business"	Azor	Azor	3:32
6.	"Step"	H. Azor; Deidra Roper; Alfred Ellis	De De "Spinderella" Roper; Tommy "D.J. Grand" Shannon^{[a]}	3:10
7.	"Shoop"	Mark Sparks; Cheryl James; Sandra Denton; Otwane Roberts	Sparks; Cheryl "Salt" James; Sandra "Pepa" Denton^{[a]}	4:07
8.	"Heaven or Hell" (featuring Styowlz (Wink & D'dae))	H. Azor; S. Azor; Michael Oliver	S. Azor	4:43
9.	"Big Shot"	H. Azor; S. Azor; Williams; Dana Jr. Mozie	H. Azor	3:47
10.	"Sexy Noises Turn Me On"	H. Azor; James	James; Denton^{[a]}	3:54
11.	"Somma Time Man"	James; Dave Wynn; Darren Callis	DJ Wynn	3:25
12.	"Break of Dawn"	H. Azor; Michael Love; Anthony Martin	Sparks; James^{[a]}	3:45
13.	"I've Got AIDS (PSA)"	James; WEATOC, Inc.	WEATOC, Inc.	3:18

International edition bonus tracks
No.	Title	Writer(s)	Producer(s)	Length
14.	"Shoop" (Danny D's radio mix)	Sparks; James; Denton; Roberts	Sparks; James; Denton^{[a]}; Danny D^{[b]}	3:51
15.	"Start Me Up"	H. Azor; S. Azor; Miguel Guerrero	Hurby Luv Bug; Kimiko Whittaker^{[a]}; Miguel "Excalibur" Guerrero^{[a]}	3:36

Australian edition bonus track
No.	Title	Writer(s)	Producer(s)	Length
16.	"Let's Talk About AIDS"	H. Azor; James	H. Azor; The Invincibles; Ben Liebrand^{[b]}^{[c]}	3:30

Japanese edition bonus tracks
No.	Title	Writer(s)	Producer(s)	Length
16.	"Let's Talk About AIDS"	H. Azor; James	H. Azor; The Invincibles; Liebrand^{[b]}^{[c]}	3:30
17.	"Emphatically No"	M. Sparks; W.A. Robinson; M. Whittle; H. Boswell; T. Colbert	Sparks; James^{[a]}	3:25

=== Notes ===
- ^{^[a]} signifies a co-producer
- ^{^[b]} signifies a remixer
- ^{^[c]} signifies an additional producer
- On international editions of the album, "I've Got AIDS (PSA)" is retitled "PSA We Talk".

=== Samples ===
- "Whatta Man" contains a sample of "What a Man" by Linda Lyndell.
- "Shoop" contains samples from "I'm Blue" by The Sweet Inspirations and "Super Sporm" by Captain Sky.
- "Heaven or Hell" contains portions of "Heaven and Hell Is on Earth" by 20th Century Steel Band and "Think About It" by Odell Brown & the Organ-izers.

== Charts ==
=== Weekly charts ===
Weekly chart performance for Very Necessary
Chart (1994)	Peak position
Australian Albums (ARIA)	5
Canada Top Albums/CDs (RPM)	13
Dutch Albums (Album Top 100)	66
European Albums (Music & Media)	73
German Albums (Offizielle Top 100)	51
New Zealand Albums (RMNZ)	27
Norwegian Albums (VG-lista)	19
UK Albums (Official Charts)	36
US Billboard 200	4
US Top R&B/Hip-Hop Albums (Billboard)	6

=== Year-end charts ===
1994 year-end chart performance for Very Necessary
Chart (1994)	Position
Australian Albums (ARIA)	45
Canada Top Albums/CDs (RPM)	74
US Billboard 200	18
US Top R&B/Hip-Hop Albums (Billboard)	13

1995 year-end chart performance for Very Necessary
Chart (1995)	Position
US Billboard 200	132

== Certifications ==
Certifications for Very Necessary
Region	Certification	Certified units/sales
Australia (ARIA)	Platinum	70,000^{^}
Canada (Music Canada)	4× Platinum	400,000^{^}
United States (RIAA)	5× Platinum	3,200,000
^{^} Shipments figures based on certification alone.
