= Silence Between Songs =

Studio album by Madison Beer
- Released: September 15, 2023
- Studios: Legacy Towers (Sherman Oaks); Silent Zoo (Los Angeles); Sota (Sarasota)
- Genres: Pop; dream pop; psychedelic pop
- Length: 44:47
- Labels: Epic; Sing It Loud
- Producers: Fred Ball; Madison Beer; Leroy Clampitt; One Love

Madison Beer chronology
Life Support (2021)	Silence Between Songs (2023)	Locket (2026)

Alternative cover

Singles from Silence Between Songs
- 1. "Reckless" Released: June 4, 2021; 2. "Dangerous" Released: August 26, 2022; 3. "Showed Me (How I Fell in Love with You)" Released: October 13, 2022; 4. "Home to Another One" Released: June 2, 2023; 5. "Spinnin" Released: August 18, 2023

Silence Between Songs is the second studio album by the American singer-songwriter Madison Beer. It was released on September 15, 2023, by Epic Records and Sing It Loud, and serves as the follow-up to Beer's first full-length album Life Support (2021). Silence Between Songs spawned five singles prior to its release; "Reckless", Dangerous", "Showed Me (How I Fell in Love with You)", "Home to Another One", and "Spinnin". The album has been described as a pop, dream pop, and psychedelic pop record with elements of psychedelic rock.

In support of the album, Beer embarked on the Spinnin Tour in 2024. The album was nominated for Best Immersive Audio Album at the 66th Annual Grammy Awards.

== Background ==
Beer released her first full-length album, Life Support, on February 26, 2021. Soon after that, she embarked on her second headlining tour, The Life Support Tour in promotion of the album.

On May 31, 2023, two days before the fourth single, "Home to Another One", Beer, along with Portnoy officially announced the title and the release date of September 15, 2023.

"I got started really young doing this, and I feel like I've had a very busy 12 years or so in the industry and I kind of convinced myself that the moments where I was making music and when I was on tour and when I was my busiest was when I was growing," she shared of the metaphorical album title. "As I've gotten a little bit older, I realized it's actually been the moments that I've been able to tune out the noise and I've been able to be alone, really reflect and be more isolated where I've grown the most. So, it's the silence between songs and when the noise is turned off is when I feel like I've learned who I am the most."

— Beer speaking about Silence Between Songs

=== Music ===
Beer sent the album to American singer-songwriter Lana Del Rey prior to its release. Beer stated in an interview that Del Rey's favorite track was "Spinnin". Beer also revealed that the album is influenced by some of her "idols" such as Tame Impala, the Beach Boys and Lana Del Rey. Silence Between Songs has been described as a pop, dream pop, and psychedelic pop record with elements of psychedelic rock.

== Release and promotion ==
=== Singles ===
The album's lead single "Reckless" was released on June 4, 2021. The song peaked at number 38 on Billboard's US mainstream Top 40, and is a pop song. The song was performed live at Beer's headlining tour The Life Support Tour as a part of the setlist.

The album's second single "Dangerous" was released on August 26, 2022.

The album's third single "Showed Me (How I Fell in Love with You)" was released on October 14, 2022.

The album's fourth single "Home to Another One" was released on June 2, 2023.

The album's fifth single "Spinnin" was released on August 18, 2023, along with a music video.

On October 18, the music video for the track "Sweet Relief" was officially released.

=== Tour ===
On October 9, 2023, Madison Beer announced The Spinnin Tour with the name referring to the album's fifth single. The tour took place in Europe and North America and featured Polish singer Jann, and American singers Charlotte Lawrence and Upsahl as supporting acts. The tour marked her third headlining concert tour after The Life Support Tour in support of her debut album. The Spinnin Tour commenced on February 24, 2024, in Stockholm and concluded on June 13, 2024, in Los Angeles consisting of a total of 52 dates across Europe and North America.

== Critical reception ==
Professional ratings
Aggregate scores
Source	Rating
Metacritic	70/100
Review scores
Source	Rating
AllMusic	3.5/5 stars
Beats Per Minute	74%
Clash	7/10
The Line of Best Fit	7/10
NME	3/5 stars
The Telegraph	3/5 stars

Silence Between Songs was met with generally positive reviews from music critics upon its release. At Metacritic, which assigns a normalized rating out of 100 to reviews from professional publications, the album received an average score of 70, based on six reviews. Poppie Platt of The Telegraph called it "vastly superior" to Life Support as it is "full of smooth, stylish pop songs just begging to become radio hits" and "seems like the album Beer has been wanting – and waiting – to make for a long, long time". Lauren deHollogne of Clash characterized the songs as "carefully crafted compositions" with "magically soft harmonies" that "seem to have more of an actual purpose", and concluded that the album is a "record with a message that is so authentically her".

The Line of Best Fit's Sam Franzini wrote that much of the album is "gentle, unassuming pop" and while "there are some exciting ideas here", it gets too "bogged down by an odd reframing of the past" as "Beer spends too much time looking through rose-colored glasses, wondering how her story will be told, for it to be relatable". Thomas Smith of NME called most of Silence Between Songs "a clear nod to Tame Impala's psych-rock as well as swooning '60s pop and rock" but stated that "there's one too many generic, string-laden ballads, and a stop-start feel to the record".

== Accolades ==
Awards and nominations
Organization	Year	Category	Result	Ref.
Grammy Awards	2024	Best Immersive Audio Album	Nominated	

== Track listing ==
Silence Between Songs track listing
No.	Title	Writer(s)	Producer(s)	Length
1.	"Spinnin"	Madison Beer; Tim Sommers; Jeremy "Kinetics" Dussolliet; Leroy Clampitt	Beer; Clampitt; One Love	2:46
2.	"Sweet Relief"	Beer; Sommers; Lucy Healey; Clampitt	Beer; Clampitt; One Love	2:41
3.	"Envy the Leaves"	Beer; Sommers; Dussolliet; Clampitt	Beer; Clampitt; One Love	3:19
4.	"17"	Beer; Clampitt; Dussolliet	Beer; Clampitt; One Love^{[a]}	3:36
5.	"Ryder"	Beer; Sommers; Dussolliet; Clampitt	Beer; Clampitt; One Love	4:06
6.	"Nothing Matters But You"	Beer; Healey; Fred Ball	Beer; Ball; Clampitt	2:45
7.	"I Wonder"	BeerHealey; Ball; Clampitt	Beer; Ball; Clampitt	2:37
8.	"At Your Worst"	Beer; Healey; Sommers; Clampitt	Beer; Clampitt; One Love	2:58
9.	"Showed Me (How I Fell in Love with You)"	Beer; Sommers; Dussolliet; Clampitt; Harold Eugene Clark; James Roger McGuinn	Beer; Clampitt; One Love	3:15
10.	"Home to Another One"	Beer; Sommers; Healey; Clampitt	Beer; Clampitt; One Love	2:29
11.	"Dangerous"	Beer; Tobias Jesso Jr.; Sommers; Dussolliet; Clampitt	Beer; Clampitt; James Francies; One Love	3:47
12.	"Reckless"	Beer; Clampitt; Sommers; Dussolliet	Beer; Clampitt^{[p]}; One Love	3:23
13.	"Silence Between Songs"	Beer; Sommers; Dussolliet; Clampitt	Beer; Clampitt; One Love	2:29
14.	"King of Everything"	Beer; Sommers; Dussolliet; Clampitt; Lowell Boland	Beer; Clampitt; One Love	4:28
Total length:				44:47

=== Notes ===
- ^{^[p]} signifies a primary and vocal producer.
- ^{^[a]} signifies an additional producer.
- "Showed Me (How I Fell in Love with You)" contains an interpolation of the Turtles version of "You Showed Me", written by Harold Eugene Clark and James Roger McGuinn and originally performed by the Byrds.

== Personnel ==
Credits adapted from the album's liner notes and the 66th Grammy Awards.

- Madison Beer – lead vocals, immersive production, art direction (all tracks); backing vocals (tracks 1, 2, 7, 8, 10), vocal arrangement (2, 3, 5, 9, 10, 13, 14), backing vocal arrangement (7)
- Leroy Clampitt – immersive production (all tracks), recording (1–11, 13, 14), guitars (1–10, 12–14), synthesizers (1–3), programmed drums (1, 2, 6, 7, 10, 12–14), bass (1, 2, 7–14), Mellotron (1, 4, 7, 13), backing vocals (1, 7, 12), lap steel (2–4, 6, 11, 13), electric bass (3, 4), vocal arrangement (3, 5, 9, 10, 13, 14), drums (3, 9, 12); percussion, programmed bass (3); piano (4, 6, 8), backing vocal arrangement (7), programming (11, 12); keyboards, string arrangement (11); programmed strings (13)
- Mitch McCarthy – mixing (all tracks), recording (12)
- Randy Merrill – mastering
- Aaron Short – immersive mixing, immersive mastering
- Sean Brennan – immersive mixing
- Mike Piacentini – immersive mixing
- Tim Sommers – recording (1–5, 8–11, 13, 14), synthesizers (1–5, 8–10), Mellotron (1–3, 5, 8–10, 13), piano (1–3, 5, 14), organ (1, 4, 9), Wurlitzer (1, 4, 11), programmed drums (2, 5, 9, 10, 12, 13), percussion (3, 8, 11); hand claps, shaker, synth bass (4); bass (5, 8–10), drums (8, 12), vocal arrangement (9, 13); keyboards, programming (11, 12); backing vocals (12)
- Lucy Healey – backing vocals (2, 6, 8), vocal arrangement (10)
- Ben Barter – drums (4, 14)
- Adam Melchor – guitars (5)
- Fred Ball – programmed drums, synthesizers, recording (6, 7); bass, programmed strings (6); organ, piano, Mellotron (7)
- Leah Metzler – cello (11)
- Judy Kang – cello (11)
- Morgan Paros – violin (11)
- Laurann Angel – violin (11)
- Amanda Lo – violin (11)
- Chris Woods – viola (11)
- James Francies – keyboards, piano, conductor, arrangement, string arrangement (11)
- Riccardo Damian – recording (11)
- Kinga Bacik – strings (12)
- Amber Park – art direction
- Jack Scott – design
- Travis Baker – design
- Flavio H. – design

== Charts ==
Chart performance
Chart (2023)	Peak position
Australian Albums (ARIA)	76
Austrian Albums (Ö3 Austria)	71
Belgian Albums (Ultratop Flanders)	42
Belgian Albums (Ultratop Wallonia)	74
Canadian Albums (Billboard)	84
Croatian International Albums (HDU)	25
Dutch Albums (Album Top 100)	39
French Albums (SNEP)	94
Irish Albums (IRMA)	59
New Zealand Albums (RMNZ)	31
Polish Albums (ZPAV)	68
Portuguese Albums (AFP)	12
Scottish Albums (Official Charts)	11
Spanish Albums (Promusicae)	46
UK Albums (Official Charts)	28
US Billboard 200	86

== Release history ==
Release dates and formats
Region	Date	Format(s)	Label	Ref.
Various	September 15, 2023	CD; digital download; streaming; vinyl LP	Epic; Sing It Loud	
