= Ellise =

American singer-songwriter

- Ellise performing in 2026 for The Internet for Palestine concert

Background information
- Born: September 10, 1998 (age 28); Foster City, California, U.S.
- Genre: Dark pop
- Occupations: Singer; songwriter
- Years active: 2016–present
- Labels: EMPIRE; AWAL
- Website: www.ellise.wtf

Ellise Mariana Gitas (born September 10, 1998), known mononymously as Ellise, is an Iraqi-American singer and songwriter. She is known for her dark-pop influenced songs and her Halloween themed extended plays. Her debut studio album, Chaotic, was released in 2021.

== Early life ==
Ellise was born in Foster City, California. Her mother moved to the United States from Iraq at 15 years old. She grew up living with her parents and younger brother, who is also a producer and a musician. After attaining her high school diploma from Monte Vista High School, she moved to Los Angeles to pursue a career as a singer, when she was age 17.

== Career ==
In 2016, she was selected for the Uproxx Uncharted series. She worked with producer Chris Seefried in the series to create her debut single, "Break Down". She was also a finalist of the 2016 iHeartRadio Rising Star Competition. In July, she performed at her first major concert at an unveiling of new rides at Luna Park. She released an EDM single titled "Dominoes" and the music video was directed by Paul Boyd.

In 2018, she left her former record label, Grange records. During this period, she independently released the dark-pop singles "Love Made Me Do It", "Fight!", and "Pinky Promise". Tracks "Nightmares" and "911" enjoyed the most success. This was followed by the release of her debut extended play (EP), Can You Keep a Secret. In 2019, she released her second EP Under My Bed. Her brother produced some of the song in the EP.

In 2021, she got signed to Empire Records, under which she released her debut album Chaotic. She was featured in Iggy Azalea's album The End of an Era, on the track "Day 3 in Miami". She released her third EP, Letting The Wolf In. In November, she collaborated with DeathbyRomy and Mothica on a remix for the song "Soul Sucker", originally from the EP. She was featured by Savage Ga$p on his debut album title track The Long Halloween.

In 2022, she signed to AWAL. Erik Ron produced "Black Balloons" and in 2023, "Half a Heart". She also released the single "Did It Hurt" in 2023. The same year, she collaborated with Ashley Sienna on the song "Pretty in the Dark", and then on "Pity Party" with Neoni.

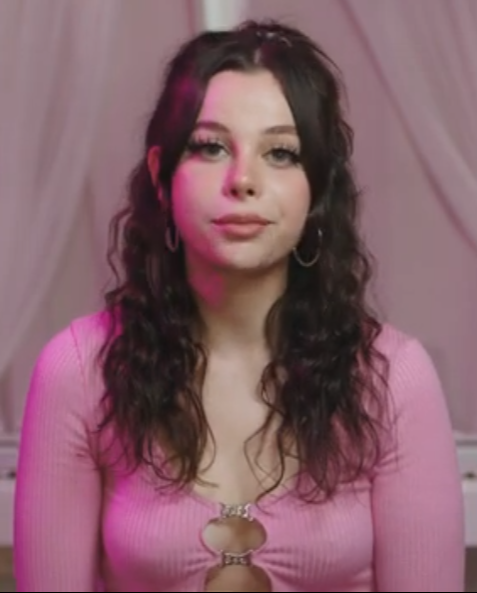
In a video from 2023

== Influences ==
She names Ariana Grande, Lorde, Lana Del Rey and Melanie Martinez as her inspirations. According to Paper Magazine and Wonderland Magazine, she makes "dark pop".

== Discography ==
=== Studio albums ===
Title	Notes
Chaotic	Released: May 14, 2021; Label: Hell Bent Heaven Sent / Empire
PRETTY EVIL	Released: March 28, 2025; Label: Hell Bent Heaven Sent

=== Live albums ===
Title	Notes
Chaotic (Live)	Released: September 10, 2021; Label: Hell Bent Heaven Sent / Empire

=== Extended plays ===
Title	Notes
Can You Keep a Secret?	Released: October 12, 2018; Label: Hell Bent Heaven Sent
Under My Bed	Released: October 17, 2019; Label: Hell Bent Heaven Sent
Letting the Wolf In	Released: October 15, 2021; Label: Hell Bent Heaven Sent / Empire
OVER HER DEAD BODY	Released: October 13, 2023; Label: Hell Bent Heaven Sent
Bedroom Confessional	Released: April 10, 2026; Label: Hell Bent Heaven Sent

=== Singles ===
Title	Year	Album
"Break Down"	2016	Non-album singles
"Dominoes"	2016	Non-album singles
"Love Made Me Do It"	2018	Non-album singles
"Pinky Promise"	2018	Non-album singles
"Fight!"	2018	Non-album singles
"Keep It To Myself"	2019	Non-album singles
"Bubblegum Brain"	2021	Chaotic
"Feeling Something Bad..."	2021	Chaotic
"Over Breakfast"	2021	Chaotic
"Soul Sucker, Pt. 2" (with DeathbyRomy and Mothica)	2021	Non-album singles
"Black Balloons"	2022	Non-album singles
"Did It Hurt?"	2022	Non-album singles
"brokenboys&bitterbitches"	2023	Non-album singles
"Pity Party" (with Neoni)	2023	Non-album singles
"She Ruins Everything"	2023	Non-album singles
"Dollface" (with Ashley Sienna)	2024	Non-album singles
"Bite"	2024	PRETTY EVIL
"Dead2Me"	2024	PRETTY EVIL
"Valentine"	2025	PRETTY EVIL
"Kill4Me"	2025	PRETTY EVIL
"Die" (with Ella Boh)	2025	Non-album singles
"Whiplash" (with Allegra Jordyn)	2025	Non-album singles
"Sexxxtapes"	2026	Bedroom Confessional
"Littlepill"	2026	Bedroom Confessional
"Her"	2026	Bedroom Confessional

=== Guest appearances ===
Title	Year	Other artist(s)	Album
"Make Me / Fly"	2017	Alec Joseph	Smashups
"Tell Me"	2019	Prince Fox	All This Music, Vol. 1
"What Are We Waiting For"	2019	VAX	Non-album single
"If I..."	2020	Didrick Franzen	Dream Journal
"Lovesick"	2021	guccihighwaters	Joke's On You
"Day 3 In Miami (End of an Era)"	2021	Iggy Azalea	The End of an Era
"Pretty In The Dark"	2023	Ashley Sienna	I Am
"Pockets"	2026	RJ Pasin	The Indomitable Human Spirit (Deluxe)

== Tours ==
=== Headlining ===
- The PRETTY EVIL Tour (2025/2026)

=== Supporting ===
- Madison Beer – The Spinnin Tour (2024)
