= Brooke Burke =

American television personality and model (born 1971)

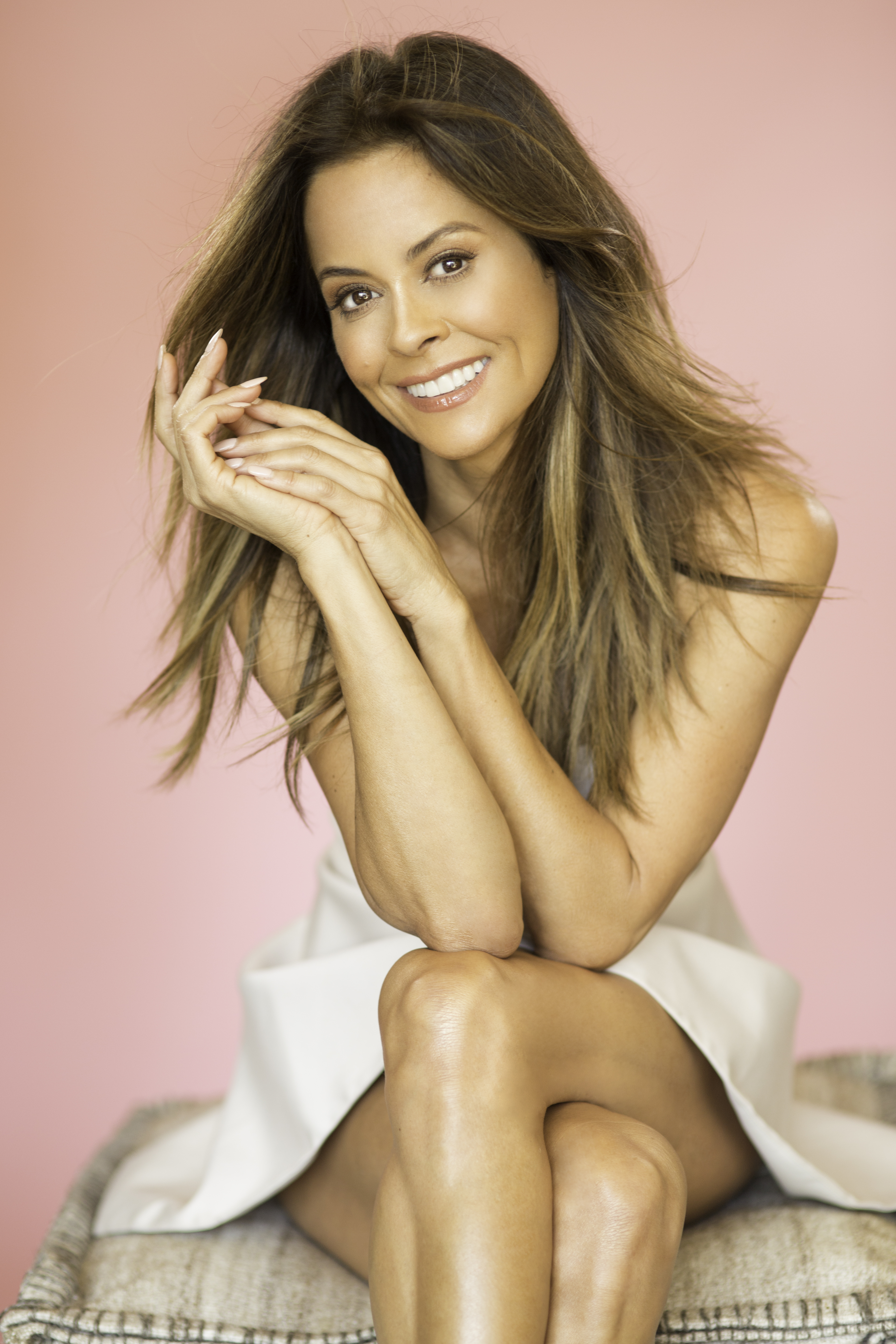
- Burke in 2021
- Born: Brooke Lisa Burke; September 8, 1971 (age 55); Hartford, Connecticut, U.S.
- Other name: Brooke Burke-Charvet
- Occupations: Television personality; fitness personality; model; author; actress; businesswoman
- Years active: 1986–present
- Notable work: Host or co-host of: Wild On!; CBS's Rock Star; She's Got the Look; Dancing with the Stars; Penn & Teller: Fool Us
- Spouses: Garth Fisher (m. 2001; div. 2005); David Charvet (m. 2011; div. 2020)
- Children: 4, including Neriah
- Website: brookeburke.com

Brooke Lisa Burke (born September 8, 1971) is an American television and fitness personality, model, author, actress, and businesswoman. She is known for hosting the E! Network travel show Wild On! (1999–2002), CBS's Rock Star (2005–2006), and TV Land's She's Got the Look (2010). After winning the seventh season of Dancing with the Stars, Burke served as co-hostess of the show from seasons 10 to 17 (2010–2013). In 2017, Burke launched "Brooke Burke Body," a fitness app with workout videos featuring her. Since 2023, Brooke has served as the host of Penn & Teller: Fool Us, joining the series in its 10th season.

== Early life ==
Brooke Lisa Burke was born in Hartford, Connecticut and raised in Tucson, Arizona, the younger of two siblings born to Donna and George Burke. Her mother is of half Portuguese background; she was adopted and then raised Jewish. Her father is of Irish and French descent and left the family when she was two years old. She was thereafter raised by her mother and Armenian stepfather in her mother's Jewish faith. She is raising her children Jewish, although she also celebrates Christmas.

She attended both Sahuaro High School and Palo Verde High School in Tucson where she was homecoming queen in 1989. She later studied broadcast journalism.

== Career ==
=== Television ===
After rising to national fame as a lingerie model for the Frederick's of Hollywood catalog in the early 1990s, Burke was tapped to serve as the host of the popular E! travel series Wild On! from 1999 to 2002. In 2005, Burke landed her first primetime network hosting gig on CBS's Rock Star: INXS (2005) and the subsequent Rock Star: Supernova (2006), both produced by Mark Burnett.

In 2010, Burke became the host of She's Got the Look on TV Land, a modeling competition series for women over 35. That same year, she was named co-hostess of ABC's Dancing with the Stars, where she remained for seven seasons (2010–2013).

Burke served as the co-host of the Miss America pageant in 2011, 2012, 2013, and 2016.

From 2016 to 2018, Burke hosted and co-produced the Saturday morning show Hidden Heroes, a hidden camera television show developed for teenagers in which each episode reveals the widespread goodwill in our world by secretly capturing heroes in action.

Her other television credits include hosting the digital series and network show I Dare You on TV Land (2018) as well as a recurring role on Melissa & Joey (2014–2015).

Burke has hosted Penn & Teller: Fool Us since 2023, replacing Alyson Hannigan as of the 10th season.

=== Dancing with the Stars performances ===
On November 25, 2008, Burke, with Derek Hough as her partner, won the seventh season of Dancing with the Stars beating Super Bowl champion Warren Sapp and his partner Kym Johnson. Burke has the privilege as the only contestant to spend 9 out of 11 weeks at the top of the leaderboard.

Week #	Dance / Song	Judges' scores			Result
Week #	Dance / Song	Inaba	Goodman	Tonioli	Result
1	Cha-cha-cha / "Are You My Woman (Tell Me So)"	7	8	8	Safe
2	Quickstep / "Lover, Come Back to Me"	9	8	9	Safe
3	Paso doble / "Palladio, First Movement"	8	8	8	Safe
4	Viennese waltz / "Daughters"	9	10	9	No elimination
5	Samba / "Hip Hip Chin Chin"	9	8	9	Safe
6	Jitterbug / "Don't Be Cruel"	10	9	10	Safe
7	Rumba / "No Air"	8	10*	8	Safe
8	Foxtrot / "Lullaby of Birdland"; Group Paso doble / "Rocks"	10; 10	10; 9	10; 10	Safe
9	Tango / "Tango Diabolo"; Mambo / "Cuban Mambo"	10; 9	8; 9	10; 9	Safe
10; Semi-finals	Jive / "The House is Rockin'"; Salsa / "Barbarabatiri"	7; 9	7; 10	7; 9	Safe
11; Finals	Samba / "Blame It On the Boogie"; Freestyle / "You're the One That I Want"; Viennese waltz / "Daughters"	9; 10; 10	9; 10; 10	10; 10; 10	WINNER

=== Magazine appearances ===
Burke has featured on the cover of many fitness, fashion, and lifestyle magazines, including Fitness, Women's Health, Redbook, and Ladies Home Journal. She also has appeared in numerous men's interest magazines such as Maxim, Stuff, Playboy, and FHM.

=== Entrepreneurial ventures ===
In 2007, Burke founded and launched BabooshBaby.com, the online store for her popular post-pregnancy belly wraps Tauts. Burke later developed Baboosh Body, a fitness product (belly wrap) made to trim the tummy.

In 2011, she launched the online community for mothers, ModernMom.com, of which she remains the co-CEO.

In 2012, Burke brought her own personal brand of fitness workouts to consumers via a DVD series with Sony Pictures Home Entertainment. The four DVD series consisted of Transform Your Body with Brooke Burke: Strength & Condition, Transform Your Body with Brooke Burke: Tone & Tighten, Brooke Burke Body: Sexy Abs, and Brooke Burke Body: 30-Day Slimdown.

Inspired by her dedication to promote women's awareness of the importance of physical and mental health, Brooke's next fitness project was to create her signature "Booty Burn" workout which she personally teaches in her hometown of Malibu, California. In 2017, Burke launched Brooke Burke Body, a fitness lifestyle app.

=== Books ===
Burke wrote her first book, The Naked Mom: A Modern Mom's Fearless Revelations, Savvy Advice, and Soulful Reflections, in 2011. In it, she reflects on motherhood, Hollywood, romance, and the challenges of creating a blended family. In 2016, she co-authored her second book, Chicken Soup for the Soul: The Joy of Less, a guide to simplifying your life, with Amy Newmark.

=== Video games ===
Burke served as the face and voice of "Rachel Teller" in Electronic Arts' video game Need for Speed: Underground 2, for which she won a Spike Video Game Award. She is also the voice of "People and Places" in Trivial Pursuit: Unhinged. She also voiced the character "the subservient chicken" in an early 2000s game called Big Bumpin'. Burke was also a playable character in the game PocketBike Racer.

=== Podcast ===
Since January 2020, Burke has co-hosted an iHeartRadio podcast titled Intimate Knowledge with former The Real Housewives of Orange County star Meghan King Edmonds and Lila Darville.

== Personal life ==
Burke was married twice and engaged once more. She was first engaged to Joseph Benjamin, a gas station owner in Los Angeles. Her first marriage was in 2001 to Garth Fisher, a plastic surgeon. They divorced in 2005.

In 2006, Burke began dating actor and singer David Charvet whom she married on August 12, 2011; Burke announced that she would take her husband's last name and be known as Brooke Burke-Charvet. Together they have a daughter (Heaven Rain, born 2007) and a son (Shaya Braven, born 2008). After seven years of marriage, the couple announced that they were divorcing in April 2018. Their divorce was finalized in March 2020.

On November 8, 2012, Burke announced she had thyroid cancer and underwent surgery to remove her thyroid. She became the face of the American Cancer Society's "Bucket List" campaign in 2014.

As of October 2020 it was revealed Burke had been in a relationship with Scott Rigsby, founding partner of an entrepreneurial real estate services firm, since August 2019.

In July 2021, Brooke's younger brother Tommy died. It was later revealed that his death was a result of complications related to obesity.

== Filmography ==
=== Film ===
Year	Title	Role	Notes
1986	The Wraith	Waitress on Roller Skates	Uncredited
2004	The Hazing (a.k.a. Dead Scared)	Jill	
2004	Knuckle Sandwich	Katherine	

=== Television ===
Year	Title	Role	Notes
1998	Pensacola: Wings of Gold	Beauty #2	Episode: "Solo Flight"
1999–2002	Wild On!	Herself	Host; 11 episodes
2002	That's Life	Reporter	Episode: "All About Lydia"
2003	Rock Me Baby	Stacey	Episode: "Prior Engagement"
2004	Monk	Reporter	Episode: "Mr. Monk and the TV Star"
2004	Less than Perfect	Nurse Benson	Episode: "22 Minus 1 Equals 4"
2004	It's All Relative	Park Ranger	Episode: "Who's Camping Now"
2004	The Bernie Mac Show	Reporter	Episode: "Being Bernie Mac"
2004	Gilmore Girls Backstage Special	Herself	Host of special for ABC Family
2005	Rock Star: INXS	Herself	Host; 32 episodes
2005	Eve	Herself	Episode: "Lights, Camera, Face Crack!"
2006	Rock Star: Supernova	Herself	Host; 33 episodes
2006	Las Vegas	Sheryl	Episode: "Cash Springs Eternal"
2007–2008	The War at Home	Ellen Morgan	Four Episodes
2008, 2010–2013	Dancing with the Stars	Herself	Competitor (season 7); Co-host (seasons 10–17)
2014	Melissa & Joey	Felicia Mancini	2 episodes
2016	Jane the Virgin	Herself	1 episode
2017	The New Celebrity Apprentice	Herself	Contestant
2023–present	Penn & Teller: Fool Us	Herself	Host

=== Video games ===
Year	Title	Role	Notes
2004	Need for Speed: Underground 2	Rachel Teller	Won the Spike Video Game Award for Best Performance by a Human Female
2006	Big Bumpin'	Herself	
2006	PocketBike Racer	Herself	

Awards and achievements
Preceded by Kristi Yamaguchi & Mark Ballas	Dancing with the Stars (US) winner Season 7 (Fall 2008 with Derek Hough)	Succeeded by Shawn Johnson & Mark Ballas
