= Jillian Rossi =

American singer-songwriter

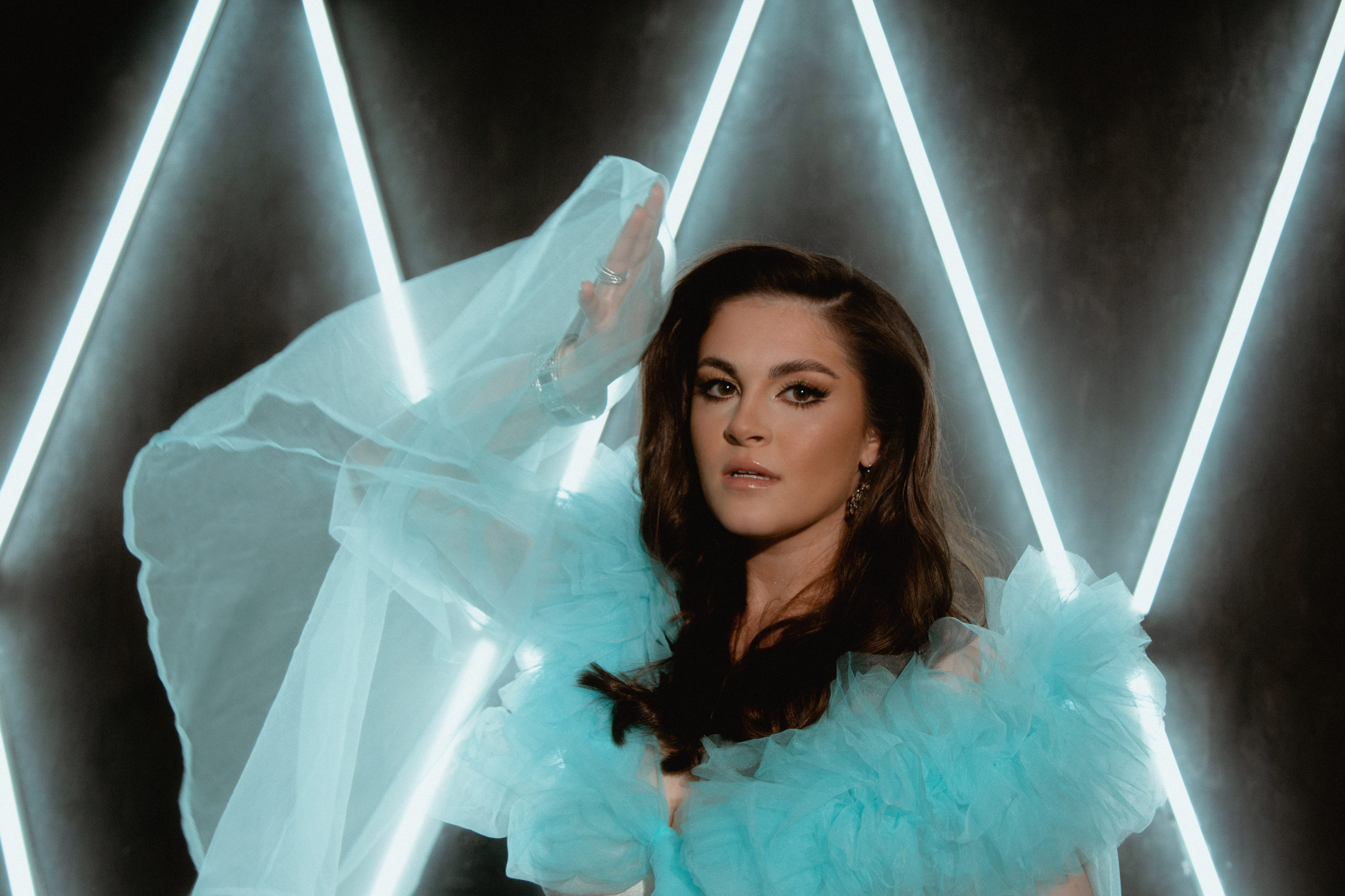

Background information
- Born: Jillian Rossi; May 17, 1999 (age 27)
- Origin: Long Island, New York
- Genres: Indie pop; pop
- Occupations: Singer; songwriter
- Years active: 2019–present
- Website: www.jillianrossi.com

Jillian Rossi is an American singer-songwriter, originally from Long Island, New York. She was an opening act for Madison Beer on the European leg of The Spinnin Tour in 2024.

== Early life ==
Jillian Rossi grew up in Long Island, New York, and now resides in Los Angeles. She graduated early from Berklee College of Music in 2020.

== Career ==
In November 2020, she released her single "So What", telling Rolling Stone India that it was made originally for a college assignment at Berklee. In February 2021, she released a duet with Caleb Hearn titled "Under the Weather". American Songwriter called the single "an honest anthem alluding to the difficulties of mental health in isolation." In April 2021, Ones to Watch called Rossi's single "Fever Dream" a "grand and anthemic [song]". In June 2021 she released "Give Me a Reason", and released "Hurt Again” in October of the same year. In September 2022, she premiered her single “Like A Boy” on Zane Lowe’s Apple Music Beats 1 show.

From February to April 2024, she was an opening act for Madison Beer on European leg of The Spinnin Tour, alongside Polish singer Jann. In November 2024, she released her Christmas song “Ms. Claus”, co-written and produced by Drew Louis.

== Discography ==
All song credits are adapted from Spotify and Apple Music.

=== Singles ===
==== As lead artist ====
Title	Year	Album	Writer(s)	Producer(s)
"Aging Well"	2025	Tourist	Jillian Rossi, Wilson McBeath, Dale Anthoni	Wilson McBeath
"Rodeo"	2025	Tourist	Jillian Rossi, Dominic Florio, Greer Baxter	Dominic Florio
"Forever Start" (with Ryan Nealon)	2025	Tourist	Jillian Rossi, Ryan Nealon, Barry Fowler, Jules Brave	Barry Fowler, Jules Brave
"And then there's you..."	2025	Tourist	Jillian Rossi, Greer Baxter, Dominic Florio	Dominic Florio
"Tornado Boy"	2024	Tourist	Jillian Rossi	Dominic Florio
"Ms. Claus"	2024	Non-album singles	Jillian Rossi, Max Vernon, Jayelle, Drew Louis	Drew Louis
"Tourist"	2024	Non-album singles	Jillian Rossi, Bendik Møller, JT Foley	Bendik Møller
"Not My Man"	2024	Non-album singles	Jillian Rossi, Dominic Florio, Greer Baxter	Dominic Florio
"Dark Comedy Magic" (with Lostboycrow)	2024	Non-album singles	Jillian Rossi, Christopher Michael Blair, Madeline Watkins, Sam Beresford	Sam Beresford
"Holy Bible"	2024	Non-album singles	Jillian Rossi, Austin Armstrong, Matt Ferree	Mattisnotfamous, Austin Armstrong
"18"	2023	Never Fully Loved	Jillian Rossi, Lexi Riese	Alexander Wilke
"Bare Minimum"	2023	Never Fully Loved	Jillian Rossi, Austin Armstrong, Zoe Moss	Austin Armstrong
"NFL"	2023	Never Fully Loved	Jillian Rossi, Bendik Møller	Bendik Møller
"West Coast (I'm In Love)" (with Smallpools)	2023	Cameras & Coastlines & Covers	Elizabeth Grant, Rick Nowels	Michael Kamerman
"Like A Boy"	2022	Never Fully Loved	Jillian Rossi, Brendan Doyle, Joseph Scott Devito, Nathaniel Motte	Cody Tarpley
"Not Used To Normal"	2022	Never Fully Loved	Jillian Rossi, Maria Landi, Nick Smith	Nick Smith
"Gemini"	2022	Non-album single	Jillian Rossi, Bram Inscore, Maria Naylon	Bram Inscore
"Hurt Again"	2021	Never Fully Loved	Jillian Rossi, Alex Borel, Colin Foote, Emma Lov Block	Alexander Wilke, Jillian Rossi, Alex Borel, Colin Foote
"Give Me A Reason"	2021	Never Fully Loved	Jillian Rossi, Ally Ahern	House of Wolf
"Fever Dream"	2021	Never Fully Loved	Jillian Rossi, Maria Landi, Perrin Xthona	Alexander Wilke
"Under the Weather" (with Caleb Hearn)	2021	Never Fully Loved	Jillian Rossi, Caleb Hearn, Nathan Proctor	Johnny Simmen, Nathan Proctor
"So What"	2020	Non-album singles	Jillian Rossi, Geva Shinar, Tony Ni Evans	Tony Ni Evans, Geva Shinar
"Txt Me When U Get Here"	2019	Non-album singles	Jillian Rossi, Philip Etherington	No producer credited

=== Studio albums ===
Title	Details
Tourist	Released: 3 April 2026; Label: Self-released; Formats: Digital download, streaming; Track listing: 1. "Attention Whore"; 2. "Lucas"; 3. "Tornado Boy"; 4. "Elephant"; 5. "And Then There's You..."; 6. "Tourist"; 7. "Not My Man"; 8. "Aging Well"
Never Fully Loved	Released: 15 December 2023; Label: Self-released; Formats: Digital download, streaming; Track listing: 1. "NFL"; 2. "18"; 3. "Give Me A Reason"; 4. "Hurt Again"; 5. "Make Me Cry"; 6. "Bare Minimum"; 7. "Like A Boy"; 8. "Not Used To Normal"; 9. "Nantucket - Demo"; 10. "Fever Dream"
