= Garth Fisher =

American plastic surgeon

- Born: September 1, 1958 (age 68); Mississippi, U.S.
- Education: University of Mississippi (BA, MD)
- Occupations: plastic surgeon and television personality
- Spouse(s): Brooke Burke (m. 2001; div. 2005) Jessica Canseco (m. 2007; div. 2011) Suelyn Medeiros (m. 2022)
- Children: 2, including Neriah

Garth Fisher (born September 1, 1958), is an American plastic surgeon best known as the first doctor selected for the ABC television show Extreme Makeover.

== Personal life ==
He was married to Jessica Canseco; and before that he was married to model and TV hostess Brooke Burke, with whom he has two daughters, Neriah and Sierra, who are raised in their mother's Jewish faith. He is married to Suelyn Medeiros, whom he wed on November 11, 2022.

== Education and career ==
Fisher graduated from the University of Mississippi with a BA in 1980 and an MD in 1984 and completed his internship, general surgery residency and plastic surgery residency at the University of California, Irvine.

Fisher has been selected as "one of the top plastic surgeons in the United States for facial cosmetic and breast surgery" in Best Doctors in America. He has also been listed annually in the Castle Connolly directory of America's Foremost Surgeons.

In 2006, Fisher partnered with Paul Scott Premo to found CellCeuticals Skin Care, Inc., a company that aims to develop skin treatment products.

== In media ==
He is best known as the plastic surgeon on ABC's Extreme Makeover television series, which had led to a number of media appearances for Fisher. Fisher has been interviewed on or been written about by a number of magazines, television shows, and radio programs.

In June 2025, Kylie Jenner revealed that Fisher was the surgeon who did her breast augmentation.
