= Emlyn (singer) =

Nashville based Pop Musician

- Also known as: Maggie Peake, emlyn
- Born: Margaret Emlen Peake; August 30, 1996 (age 30); Nashville, Tennessee
- Origin: Los Angeles, California
- Genres: Pop; Alt pop; Grunge
- Occupations: Singer; songwriter
- Instrument: Vocals
- Years active: 2012-present
- Label: Sonderview

Margaret Peake (born August 30, 1996), known professionally as emlyn (stylized in all lowercase) is an American singer, songwriter originally from Nashville, Tennessee. She released her debut single, "Had Me at Hello" in 2019. Emlyn is best known for her 2022 single "Rapunzel". Emlyn has released one EP and two albums thus far, most recently being That's How You Make a Villain in 2024. Emlyn has collaborated with various artists such as, Mothica, Cloudy June and Laura Marano.

== Early life ==
Margaret Emlen Peake was born on August 30, 1996, in Nashville, Tennessee. Peake throughout her childhood was interested in music, growing up in the city that's been dubbed "Music City", as well as her father being a drummer. When she was 7 to 8, Peake would frequently join her father on stage when his band would perform. In 2012, Peake released her debut album under the stage name, Maggie Peake, called You're Not Alone. Peake also cowrote a song called "Gold" by Matt Hartke. After she graduated, Peake moved to Los Angeles to further her song writing career and her career as a solo artist. After moving to LA, Peake started her solo career under the name "emlyn".

== Career ==
=== 2019 - 2022: Confessions of a Drama Queen and Loneliest B!tch In America ===
Before she started her solo career Emlyn collaborated with a handful of different artists such as Stela Cole, Kiiara, Brook Williams and Hailey Knox, as a songwriter. In 2019, Emlyn released her debut single, from her solo professional career, "Had Me At Hello", a reference to the film Jerry Maguire. The song is about bad relationships Emlyn has had in the past.

In January 2021 Emlyn released "Cruel World". In March Emlyn released "A Thousand Parties". In April Emlyn released "Change For Me". In May Emlyn released "B.O.M.B." or "Back on My Bullshit". July saw the release of "Plot Line". August saw the release of "Remember". August also the release of Emlyn's debut EP Confessions of a Drama Queen. In October would see the release "God Sent Me Karma", the first single from Emlyn's upcoming debut album.

2022 saw the release of more singles from Emlyn's upcoming debut album. In January Emlyn released "Rapunzel", a nod to the famous Disney Princess, Rapunzel. In February, Emlyn was featured on the single "Good For Her" by MOTHICA. In March Emlyn released "Right?". In April she released "The Audacity". In June, Emlyn would release her debut album, Loneliest B!tch In America. In August Emlyn released "Glimpse of Us". In September she released "My Best Friend's Ex". In October, Emlyn released the Spotify exclusive single "Girl's Girl". In November Emlyn released her first Christmas song, "Dear Santa".

=== 2023 - Present: That's How You Make A Villain ===
In 2023 Emlyn began releasing singles for her sophomore album, which would be released in two parts. Starting with the Cloudy June's single "You Problem" in which Emlyn is featured on, released in February. In March, Emlyn released the first solo single from the project "Badder." In May she released "Dot Dot Dot". In July Emlyn the single "That's How You Make a Villain", also the title of her upcoming Album. In September Emlyn released "10 20 30". November 2023 saw the release of the first half Emlyn's second album, That's How You Make a Villain (chapter 1). In December Emlyn released a cover of the song Clean by Taylor Swift.

2024 saw the release of the final two singles from Emlyn's second album. In March Emlyn released "Oops My Bad". In May Emlyn released "World's Greatest Ex". In June, Emlyn released the second half her album, That's How You Make a Villain (chapter 2). July saw the completed second album, That's How You Make a Villain.

In October 2024 Emlyn released a standalone single, "Choke". 2025 saw the release of two more standalone singles, "We're Just Girls" and "Good Girls Don't Make Headlines". In 2026 Emlyn was featured on a remix of Laura Marano's song "Boombox", originally released in 2016. In October 2026, Emlyn released "exraordinary".

== Artistry and Influences ==
Emlyn's music and songwriting is primarily inspired by Taylor Swift. Other notable artists and bands Emlyn takes inspiration from are Miley Cyrus, 5 Seconds of Summer and Paramore. Emlyn also credits the novel, The Great Gatsby as an inspiration for her story telling in her music. Emlyn often writes about past failed relationships she's been in, often giving the trope of a crazy ex girlfriend. Her artistry has been described and charismatic and full of authenticity, embracing issues such as anxiety and empowerment. Emlyn categorizes her music as a fusion of grunge and pop. Emlyn credits the growth of her audience though social media apps such as TikTok and Instagram.

== Discography ==
Albums and EPs
Name	Type	Year
Confessions of a Drama Queen	EP	2021
Loneliest B!tch in America	Album	2022
That's How You Make a Villain - Chapter 1	EP	2023
That's How You Make a Villain - Chapter 2	EP	2024
That's How You Make a Villain	Album	2024

Singles
Name	Year
You Had Me At Hello	2019
Cruel World	2021
A Thousand Parties	2021
Change For Me	2021
B.O.M.B.	2021
Plot Line	2021
Remember	2021
God Sent Me Karma	2021
Rapunzel	2022
Right?	2022
The Audacity	2022
Glimpse of Us	2022
My Best Friend's Ex	2022
Girl's Girl	2022
Dear Santa	2022
You Problem	2023
Badder	2023
Dot Dot Dot	2023
That's How You Make Villain	2023
10 20 30	2023
Clean (Emlyn's Version)	2023
Oops My Bad	2024
World's Greatest Ex	2024
Choke	2024
We're Just Girls	2025
Good Girls Don't Make Headlines	2025
Extraordinary	2026

As Featured Artist
Name	Artist	Year
Good For Her	MOTHICA	2022
You Problem	Cloudy June	2023
Boombox (2026 Version)	Laura Marano	2026
