= DeathbyRomy =

American singer-songwriter (born 1999)

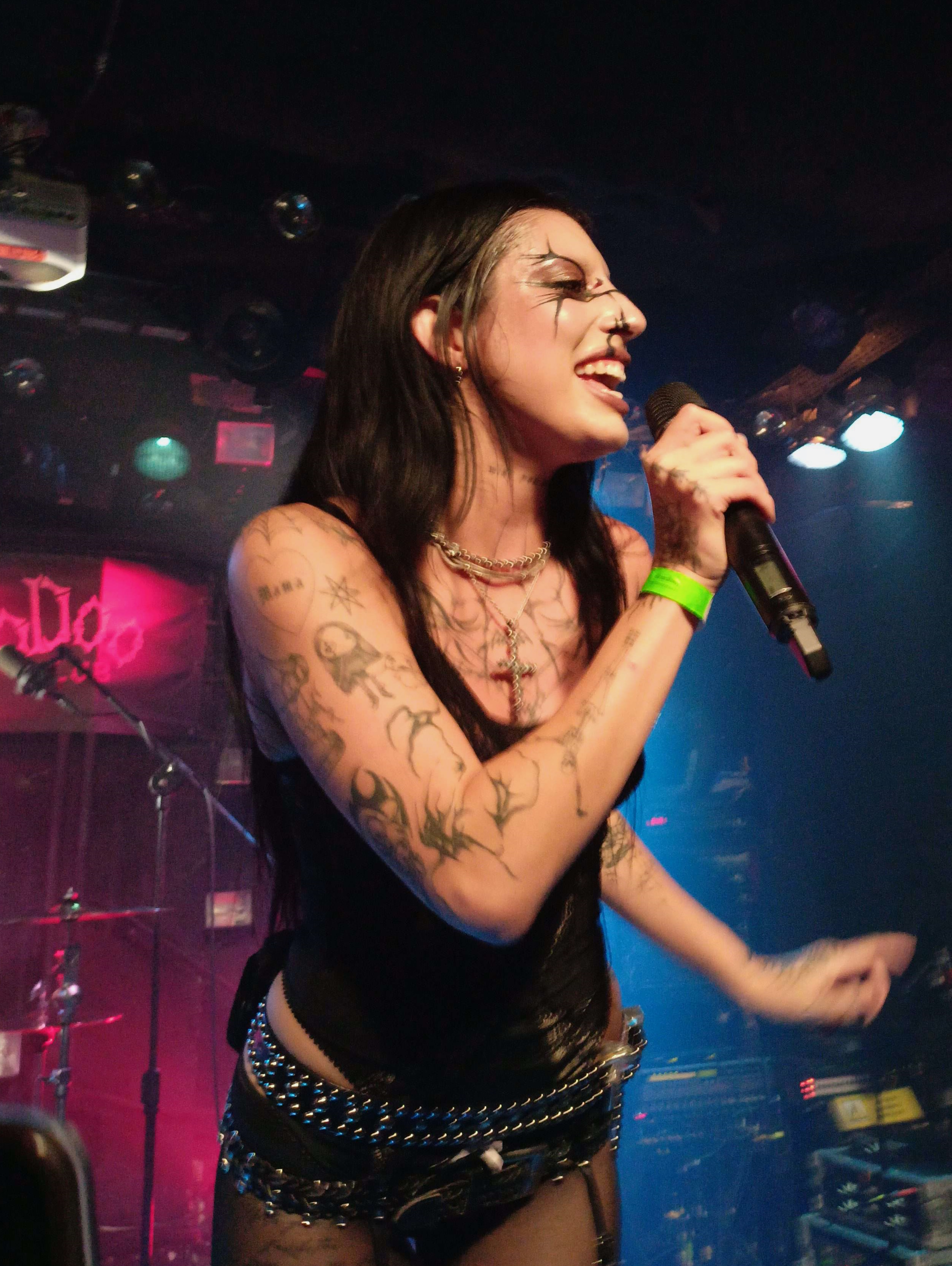
- DeathbyRomy performing in Warsaw, 2023

Background information
- Born: Romy Maxine Flores; December 19, 1999 (age 26); Los Angeles, California, United States
- Genres: Alternative pop; nu metal; dark pop; electropop; industrial; alternative R&B; trap; rock
- Occupation: Singer-songwriter
- Years active: 2017–present
- Labels: Capitol Records; ONErpm
- Website: deathbyromy.com

Romy Maxine Flores (born December 19, 1999), known professionally as DeathbyRomy, is an American singer-songwriter. Born and raised in Los Angeles, California, she began performing music professionally at age 15. Since her debut LP Monsters came out in 2018, Flores has released five albums, with the most recent one being 2025's Hollywood Forever. She is most known for her 2019 single "Problems", which amassed over 70 million streams on Spotify following its success on the video-hosting service TikTok.

== Early life ==
Flores was born on December 19, 1999, in Los Angeles, California. She is of mixed heritage; her father's family is Mexican, and her mother is European. She wrote her first song at the age of 5.

== Career ==
Flores released her first song at the age of 15. Her first single on Spotify, "Tiempo", was self-released. She continued to release music independently for another year, in which time she also released her debut album Monsters, which included features from other singers such as Lil B and Yung Bans. Her stage name, DeathbyRomy, comes from her past struggles with suicidal tendencies and is an attempt at "claiming personal love".

=== 2019–2021: Capitol Records ===
In 2019 Flores signed to UMG-owned label Capitol Records for her next project. On October 4 she released the single "Problems", the first single from her then-upcoming EP. The song went viral on TikTok, becoming her breakthrough hit and her most streamed song on Spotify and YouTube. The EP Love U - to Death came out the same month, followed the next year by a remix of "Problems" featuring 24kGoldn.

In 2020 Flores released several singles, including songs featured on the soundtrack of the thriller film Promising Young Woman. Her second album, the EP Songs For My Funeral, came out in August 2021, following the promotional single "Day I Die" which came out the month prior. The record featured "Problems", as well as several of her singles from the past year.

In 2021, Flores and Mothica were featured by Ellise on the latter's track titled "Soul Sucker, Pt. 2".

=== 2022–present: Independent ===
Since 2022, Flores has been releasing music in partnership with ONErpm. On October 28, 2022, she released her third EP, Entropy. One year later, on October 27, 2023, she released the single "Hellhound" featuring Jazmin Bean. Her second studio album, Hollywood Forever, was released on April 25, 2025.

== Influences ==
Flores's music evokes themes of anxiety, depression, and suicide, which—paired with her goth clothing and dark, dramatic makeup—draws many parallels to artists such as Zola Jesus. Describing her own music as "the love-child of pop, trap, industrial, and cinematic", her blending of various genres can be credited to her diverse influences, among which she cites The Beatles, Björk, and Bring Me the Horizon. The topic of interplay between life and death in Flores's music also stems from her multi-cultural background, especially Mexican traditions and beliefs, such as the Day Of The Dead.

== Discography ==
=== Studio albums ===
Title	Details
Monsters	Released: September 14, 2018; Label: Independent
Hollywood Forever	Released: April 25, 2025; Label: Independent
Teenage Fever Dream	Releases: October 30, 2026; Label: Independent

=== EPs ===
Title	Details
Love U - to Death	Released: October 25, 2019; Label: Independent
Songs for My Funeral	Released: August 20, 2021; Label: Capitol Records
Entropy	Released: October 28, 2022; Label: Independent

=== Singles ===
Title	Details
"Tiempo"	Released: August 6, 2017; Label: Independent
"Fiending for a Lover"	Released: July 31, 2020; Label: Capitol Records
"Release Yourself"	Released: October 7, 2020; Label: Capitol Records
"Lovesick"	Released: April 22, 2022; Label: Independent
"Crazy"	Released: July 20, 2023; Label: Independent
"Saint"	Released: Sept 29, 2023; Label: Independent
"Guerra"	Released: June 13, 2025; Label: Independent
"Feed" (with TX2)	Released: August 28, 2025; Label: Hopeless Records
"BDSM"	Released: February 13, 2026; Label: Independent
"BODY HORROR"	Released: April 17, 2026; Label: Independent
"Manic Dream"	Released: June 5, 2026; Label: Independent
"2468"	Released: July 24, 2026; Label: Independent
