= Barb Wire (soundtrack) =

Soundtrack album to Barb Wire by various artists
- Released: April 23, 1996
- Genre: Rock
- Length: 41:10
- Label: London Records

Professional ratings
Review scores
Source	Rating
AllMusic	2.5/5 stars

Barb Wire: Original Motion Picture Soundtrack Album is the soundtrack to the 1996 film of the same name. It was released in April 1996 via London Records. It contains tracks and covers of songs by Patti Smith and Cameo. Randall Poster served as compilation producer.

== Track listing ==
No.	Title	Writer(s)	Producer(s)	Length
1.	"Welcome to Planet Boom" (performed by Tommy Lee and Pamela Anderson)	Tommy Lee	Scott Humphrey	3:58
2.	"She's So Free" (performed by Johnette Napolitano)	Johnette Napolitano		2:54
3.	"Spill the Wine" (performed by Michael Hutchence)	Sylvester Allen; Harold Ray Brown; B.B. Dickerson; Lonnie Jordan; Charles Miller; Lee Oskar; Howard E. Scott	Doug Rasheed	5:51
4.	"Word Up!" (performed by Gun)	Larry Blackmon; Tomi Jenkins	Chris Sheldon	4:17
5.	"Don't Call Me Babe" (performed by Shampoo)	Jacqueline Blake; Carolyn Askew; Conall Fitzpatrick	Conall Fitzpatrick	2:58
6.	"Hot Child in the City" (performed by Hagfish)	Nick Gilder; Jimmy McCulloch	David Kahne	2:34
7.	"Let's All Go Together" (performed by Marion)	Phil Cunningham; A.P. Grantham; Jaime Harding	Alistair Clay	3:08
8.	"Dancing Barefoot" (performed by Die Cheerleader)	Ivan Kral; Patti Smith	Tony Taverner	3:49
9.	"Scum" (performed by Meat Puppets In Vapourspace)	Curt Kirkwood	Paul Leary	5:38
10.	"Ça plane pour moi" (performed by Mr. Ed Jumps The Gun)	Lou Deprijck; Yves M. Lacomblez		2:32
11.	"None of Your Business (Barb Wire Metal Mix)" (performed by Salt-N-Pepa)	Hurby Azor	Hurby Luv Bug	3:31
Total length:				41:10
