= Neriah (singer) =

American singer and songwriter

NERIAH
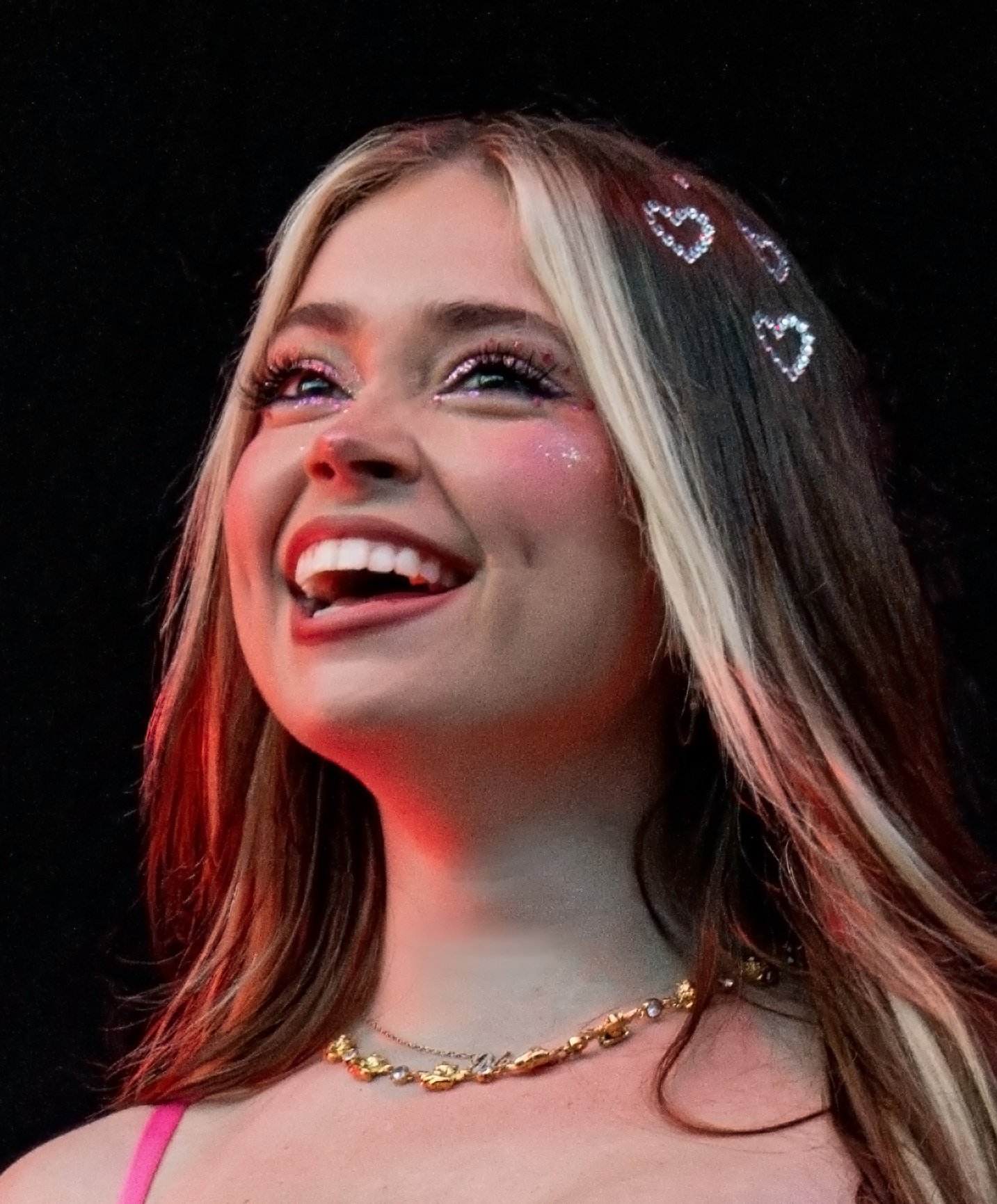
- NERIAH performing at the Greek Theatre in 2024

Background information
- Born: Neriah Fisher; March 15, 2000 (age 26); Los Angeles, California, United States
- Occupations: Singer; songwriter; influencer; television personality
- Years active: 2019–present
- Website: neriahmerch.com

Neriah Fisher, known professionally as NERIAH, is an American singer, songwriter and influencer. She is the daughter of television personality Brooke Burke and plastic surgeon Garth Fisher. Gaining initial public attention through her family's media presence, NERIAH has since built a name for herself in the music industry with her emotionally driven pop music and strong presence on platforms like YouTube and Instagram.

== Early life ==
NERIAH was born in the United States to Brooke Burke and Garth Fisher. She is the eldest daughter of Brooke Burke's four children and was raised with her mother's Jewish religion and traditions. She was exposed to the media life very young, often appearing with her mother in red carpet events such as the Teen Choice Awards in 2019. She began writing music in her teens and exploring different types of creativity via her YouTube channel, where she initially posted vlogs and beauty content.

== Career ==
NERIAH released her debut EP "This Is How The World Made Me" in 2022 followed by the vital single "Unfinished Business", which gained lots of attention on TikTok. While her early single "Breakup Sex" focused on a confessional tone, "Unfinished Business" moved more towards gentle songwriting. In an interview with Out Now Magazine, NERIAH explained the emotional inspiration behind the acoustic version of "Unfinished Business" she states that releasing it as a duet helped to the tell the story.

On October 8, 2022, NERIAH was featured as a performer at the Atlanta Pride festival in Piedmont Park, sharing the stage with artists such as Flo Rida, Big Freedia, Betty Who, Sophia Dashing and Jax as part of the event's official music lineup. The festival, which returned in person that year following two years of virtual celebrations, drew over 100,000 attendees and is considered one of the largest LGBTQ+ pride events in the Southeastern United States.

Speaking to People Magazine in late 2022, she described her music as "the soundtrack to your worst breakup," noting that even as a child, songwriting was how she processed her emotions. "I wrote my first song when I was 5 years old, and I haven't been able to stop since — it became a huge part of my life", she shared. Her October 2022 EP "How Do I Get Clean?" further explored the healing process after a breakup, and she cited Julia Michaels as a key inspiration for her emotionally honest writing. "Even when I couldn't fully articulate my feelings I was always able to turn those emotions into music", she told People.

In July 2024, NERIAH released the single "Driving Weather", which Pulp Magazine described it as a feel good retro California vibe. In another interview, this time with PopDust, she described "Driving Weather" as one of her favorite songs, because of the nostalgic tone and appeal.

In March 2025, NERIAH released her single "Gone Girl", which Nylon Manila featured in their music round-up.

Later, NERIAH would release "Napoleon Complex" on April 2025, "Out of Your League" in May 2025 and a year later, "Kissing For Practice" on May 2026.

== Discography ==
=== Singles ===
Title	Year	
"I Don't Wanna Live Forever" (featuring Jada Facer)	2016	
"South of the Border"	2019	
"Loner"	2020	
"Jumprope"	2020	
"2008"	2021	
"Sammy"	2021	
"Want you back"	2021	
"Unfinished Business"	2022	
"Unfinished Business" (featuring Toosii)	2022	
"lego Blocks"	2022	
"SH!TSHOW"	2022	
"Overrated"	2022	
"Promise" (featuring Kaze)	2022	
"Love Is A Highway" (featuring Nurko)	2023	
"First Time"	2024	
"Driving Weather"	2024	
"Driving Weather" (Acoustic)	2024	
"Don't Let Go"	2024	
"Red Flag"	2024	
"Only Always" (featuring Jake Miller)	2025	
"Gone Girl"	2025	
"Napoleon Complex"	2025	
"Out of Your League"	2025	2026
"Kissing For Practice"		2026

=== EPs ===
- This Is How The World Made Me (2022)
- How Do I Get Clean? (2022)
- No One Cries Forever (2023)
- Reason To Hate You (2025)

=== Albums ===
Album	Year
Cause of Death	2023
Cause of Death (Deluxe)	2023
