= Spinnin (Madison Beer song) =

Single by Madison Beer

from the album Silence Between Songs
- Released: August 18, 2023
- Length: 2:46
- Label: Epic; Sing It Loud
- Songwriters: Madison Beer; Jeremy Dussolliet; Leroy Clampitt; Tim Sommers
- Producers: Madison Beer; Leroy Clampitt; Tim Sommers

Madison Beer singles chronology
"Home to Another One" (2023)	"Spinnin" (2023)	"Make You Mine" (2024)

Music video
- "Spinnin" on YouTube

"Spinnin" is a song by American singer-songwriter Madison Beer, released on August 18, 2023, through Epic Records and Sing It Loud as the fifth single from her second studio album, Silence Between Songs. The track was written and produced by Madison Beer, Leroy Clampitt, Kinetics, and One Love.

== Background ==
The song was inspired by the Beatles 1965 song "Yesterday".

== Music video ==
The music video was released on August 18, 2023, along with the song. The video depicts that the world has stopped spinning with everything frozen in time and Madison being the only person left where she walks through her town; runs through a corn field; and collapses to the ground with a spotlight on her while cars with flashing headlights line behind her.

The video was directed by Aerin Moreno and Madison Beer herself; also being credited as the writer.

== Charts ==
Chart performance for "Spinnin"
Chart (2023)	Peak position
New Zealand Hot Singles (RMNZ)	32

== Release history ==
Release history and formats for "Spinnin"
Region	Date	Format	Label(s)	Ref.
Various	August 18, 2023	Digital download; streaming	Epic; Sony	
