= Pusher (musician) =

Canadian musician

Martin Bernie, known professionally as Pusher, is a musician based in Toronto.

Pusher's song "I Can't Believe It" is about the social problem of lack of access to affordable housing.

Pusher released their debut album in 2016. Their album Paperman came out in 2018.

Various commentators have said that Pusher's music has themes of social consciousness and optimism and nihilism.

While quarantining for COVID-19 Pusher created a lot of music. Pusher grew up in Merrickville–Wolford.

== Further consideration ==
- indieep (March 23, 2018). "Marty Bernie "Pusher"" (video). www.youtube.com.
