= The Pusher (band) =

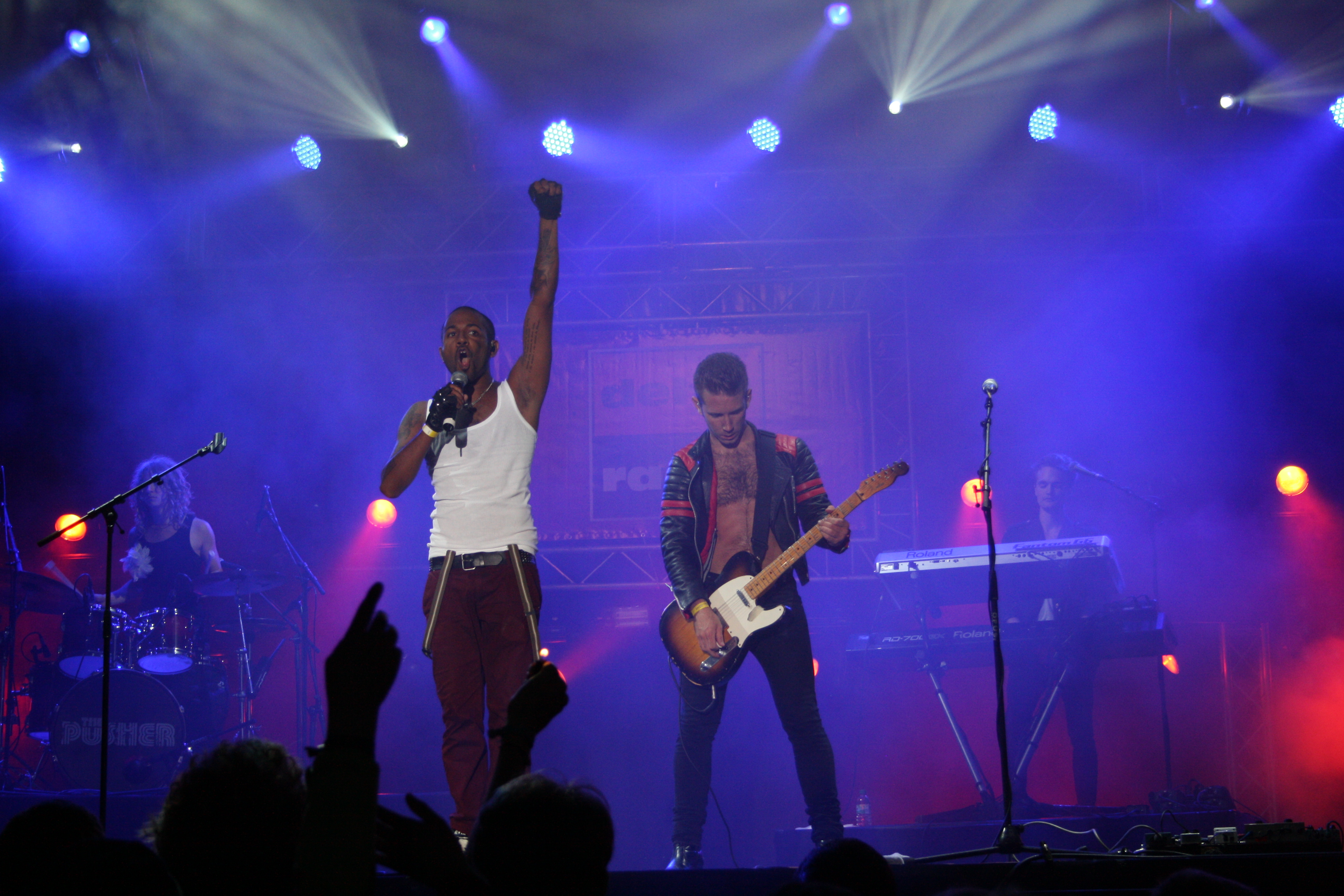
- The Pusher live during Kiel Week 2011

Background information
- Origin: Sweden
- Genres: Pop
- Years active: 2007–present
- Label: EMI / Parlophone
- Members: Jakke Erixson; John Hårleman; Pontus Karlsson; Karl-Ola Solem Kjellholm
- Website: www.the-pusher.de

The Pusher is a Swedish music group. The group is known for pop songs with strong melodies and powerful live performances.

== About ==
The Pusher consists of the members Pontus Karlsson (drums), Jakke Erixson (vocals, bass), Karl-Ola Solem (guitar) und John Hårleman (keyboards). The four musicians come from different places in Sweden.

== History ==
The Pusher was formed in 2007 with its current lineup in 2009 and quickly built a following through an active social media strategy and extensive live performances across Scandinavia. The band signed with EMI Music Sweden, followed shortly after by a deal with EMI Music Germany.

Their debut album The Art of Hit Music, co-produced by Oscar Holter — later known for his work with Max Martin and for co-producing The Weeknd's "Blinding Lights", one of the most streamed songs in history — was released on 19 August 2011. The first single "Blinded by the Dark" debuted at #1 on the Swedish iTunes chart. The album reached #17 on the German album charts. The second single release, Blow Me And Run, followed on 4 November 2011.

The band received extensive television exposure across Europe, including multiple performances on the German TV show ZDF-Fernsehgarten, multiple appearances on SAT.1-Frühstücksfernsehen, and appearances on TV4 Nyhetsmorgon in Sweden. Both "Blinded by the Dark" and "Blow Me and Run" received heavy rotation on MTV. The band also contributed and performed the vignette music for Kitchen Hero, the cooking show by Donal Skehan aired on RTÉ One in Ireland, and appeared in the show's first season.

== Chart success & Discography ==
- Sweden: #1 single ("Blinded by the Dark")
- Germany: #17 album ("The Art of Hit Music")

Singles:

- "Blinded by the Dark" — released 21 January 2011 — #1 Sweden
- "Blow Me and Run" — released 4 November 2011
- "Planets" — released 16 December 2011

Album:

- The Art of Hit Music (2011) — Parlophone Sweden / EMI Music Germany - released on 19 August 2011

== Tours ==
- Out of Style Tour (2011) - with Sunrise Avenue
- The Art of Hit Music Tour (2012)
- European tour (2013) — supporting Takida and Europe

== Trivia ==
Hårlemans ancestors designed the Stockholm Palace. Thus, the family has a private room for them in the palace. In addition, his father is a knight.

Erixson was born in Gränna, the city in which polkagris was invented.

Kjellholm and Erixson is also songwriters for other international artists.

== Members ==
- Jakke Erixson — vocals, bass
- Karl-Ola Solem Kjellholm — guitar
- Pontus Karlsson — drums
- John Hårleman — keyboards

== Discography ==
Year	Album details	Chart positions	Sales	Certifications (sales thresholds)
Year	Album details	SWE	Sales	Certifications (sales thresholds)
2011	The Art of Hit Music: Released: 19 August 2011; Label: EMI; Formats: CD	9		
