= You Showed Me =

1968 single by the Turtles

Song by the Byrds

from the album Preflyte
- Released: July 29, 1969
- Recorded: 1964
- Studio: World Pacific (Los Angeles)
- Genre: Pop
- Length: 2:05
- Label: Together
- Songwriters: Gene Clark; Jim McGuinn
- Producer: Jim Dickson

"You Showed Me" is a song written by Gene Clark and Jim McGuinn (later known as Roger) of the Byrds in 1964. It was recorded by the Turtles and released as a single at the end of 1968, becoming the group's last big hit in the US. The song has also been covered or partially incorporated into other songs by a number of other acts over the years, including the Lightning Seeds, Salt-N-Pepa, Lutricia McNeal and Madison Beer.

== The Byrds version ==
The song was composed by Clark and McGuinn in early 1964 at a time when the pair were performing as a duo at The Troubadour and other folk clubs in and around Los Angeles. Critic Matthew Greenwald has described "You Showed Me" as "a minor-key romantic ballad", while also commenting that "the song has a near-Beach Boys feel and ends up being an effervescent piece of moody pop." Music historian Richie Unterberger has remarked that "You Showed Me", like many of the songs that Clark had a hand in writing during the 1960s, contains a mix of major and minor chords arranged in unexpected progressions. He also stated that the song recounts the tale of a lover who is being tutored in the ways of love by a more experienced partner.

Soon after writing "You Showed Me", Clark and McGuinn formed a trio with David Crosby and named themselves the Jet Set. The trio began rehearsing at World Pacific Studios under the guidance of their manager Jim Dickson, with Michael Clarke and Chris Hillman joining the group soon afterward. Dickson recorded many of the Jet Set's rehearsal sessions at World Pacific and it was during this time that demos of "You Showed Me" were recorded by the band. The song was soon abandoned by the group, who had now changed their name to the Byrds, and was not included on their debut album, Mr. Tambourine Man. However, recordings of "You Showed Me" by the Byrds, dating from 1964, were released on the archival albums Preflyte, In the Beginning, The Prefylte Sessions, and Preflyte Plus.

== The Turtles version ==
"You Showed Me"
- US picture sleeve

Single by the Turtles

from the album The Turtles Present the Battle of the Bands
- B-side: "Buzz Saw"
- Released: December 1968
- Genre: Psychedelic pop
- Length: 3:16
- Label: White Whale
- Songwriters: Jim McGuinn; Gene Clark
- Producer: Chip Douglas

The Turtles singles chronology
"Elenore" (1968)	"You Showed Me" (1968)	"House on the Hill" (1969)

In 1968, the song was recorded by the Turtles for their album The Turtles Present the Battle of the Bands (where, as part of the album's concept, it is jokingly credited to the fictional nudist band "Natures Children"). It was also released as a single in 1968, reaching No. 6 on the US Billboard Hot 100.

"You Showed Me" had been introduced to the Turtles by their producer and former bass player, Chip Douglas, who had first become acquainted with the song after hearing Clark, McGuinn, and Crosby perform it at The Troubadour in 1964. Douglas had also performed the song with Clark during 1966, while he was a member of Gene Clark and the Group. Although the song had originally been an uptempo number, Douglas first demonstrated it for the Turtles' vocalists Howard Kaylan and Mark Volman on a harmonium with a broken bellows, requiring him to play the song slowly. The slower tempo impressed Kaylan and Volman and consequently, the Turtles' recording of the song uses this slower arrangement. Their version features an accompaniment of strings, including violins, violas, and cellos.

=== Charts ===
==== Weekly charts ====
Chart (1969)	Peak position
Canada Top Singles (RPM)	13
France (SNEP)	8
New Zealand (Recorded Music NZ)	20
US Billboard Hot 100	6
US Cash Box Top 100	4
US Record World Singles	1

==== Year-end charts ====
Chart (1969)	Rank
Canada Top Singles (RPM)	59
US Billboard Hot 100	80
US Cash Box Top 100	58

== Salt-N-Pepa version ==
"You Showed Me"
- Artwork for non-US releases

Single by Salt-N-Pepa

from the album Blacks' Magic
- B-side: "Let's Talk About Sex" (remix)
- Released: November 18, 1991
- Length: 3:23
- Label: Next Plateau
- Songwriters: Gene Clark; Jim McGuinn
- Producers: The Invincibles; Excalibar

Salt-N-Pepa singles chronology
"Let's Talk About Sex" (1991)	"You Showed Me" (1991)	"Expression" (Hard Ecru edit) (1992)

American rap trio Salt-N-Pepa incorporated parts of the song into their version of "You Showed Me" on their third album, Blacks' Magic (1990). It was released in November 1991 by Next Plateau Records as the sixth and final single from that album. This single charted on the US Billboard Hot 100 and also reached No. 15 on the UK Singles Chart when it was released as a single in 1991.

=== Critical reception ===
Ian Gittins from Melody Maker wrote, "The always vaguely-likeable Salt 'N' Pepa return with a sharp and sassy track which uses the same farty horn motif as their "Tramp" debut of three years back."

=== Track listing ===
1. "You Showed Me" (The Born Again mix) – 3:25
2. "You Showed Me" (The Born Again club mix) – 5:41
3. "Let's Talk About Sex" (Universal club) – 7:16

=== Charts ===
==== Weekly charts ====
Chart (1991–1992)	Peak position
Australia (ARIA)	24
Austria (Ö3 Austria Top 40)	13
Belgium (Ultratop 50 Flanders)	7
Europe (Eurochart Hot 100)	28
Europe (European Dance Radio)	9
Europe (European Hit Radio)	20
Finland (Suomen virallinen lista)	8
France (SNEP)	17
Germany (GfK)	13
Ireland (IRMA)	7
Netherlands (Dutch Top 40)	5
Netherlands (Single Top 100)	5
New Zealand (Recorded Music NZ)	12
Sweden (Sverigetopplistan)	18
Switzerland (Schweizer Hitparade)	15
UK Singles (Official Charts)	15
UK Airplay (Music Week)	17
UK Dance (Music Week)	10
UK Club Chart (Record Mirror)	35
US Billboard Hot 100	47
US Hot R&B/Hip-Hop Songs (Billboard)	68
US Cash Box Top 100	60

==== Year-end charts ====
Chart (1992)	Position
Belgium (Ultratop 50 Flanders)	69
Germany (Media Control)	58
Netherlands (Dutch Top 40)	71
Netherlands (Single Top 100)	56

== The Lightning Seeds version ==
"You Showed Me"
- Artwork for standard UK and Australian releases

Single by the Lightning Seeds

from the album Dizzy Heights
- Released: April 14, 1997
- Genre: Trip hop
- Length: 4:09
- Label: Epic
- Songwriters: Jim McGuinn; Gene Clark

The Lightning Seeds singles chronology
"Sugar Coated Iceberg" (1997)	"You Showed Me" (1997)	"What You Say" (1997)

Music video
- "You Showed Me" on YouTube

In 1996, the song was covered in a trip hop style by British alternative rock band the Lightning Seeds on their fourth album, Dizzy Heights (1996), and released as the album's fourth and final single in April 1997 by Epic Records. It was originally intended to be a B-side to their single "What If..." (1996), and utilises loops and samples from the Turtles original. The song became the Lightning Seeds' most successful chart release (not including the two versions of "Three Lions") reaching No. 8 in the UK. By the time the single was released, drummer Chris Sharrock had left the band to join Robbie Williams' backing group, and new percussionist Zak Starkey took his place in its accompanying music video, directed by Pedro Romhanyi. Additionally, it peaked at No. 4 in Iceland and No. 42 on the Eurochart Hot 100. It was also included on the Austin Powers: International Man of Mystery soundtrack.

=== Critical reception ===
Dave Sholin from the Gavin Report wrote, "One of the Turtles' biggest hits comes out of its shell to be artfully re-invented by the Lightning Seeds. A gigantic hit in 1969, it plays well in Mike Myers' newest comedy, Austin Powers: International Man of Mystery. The film, like the song, doesn't disappoint." A reviewer from Music Week rated it four out of five, adding, "Remixed and reshaped from the version included on Dizzy Heights, it's a moody, atmospheric offering." David Sinclair from The Times named it a "workmanlike version of the song written by Gene Clark and James McGuinn of the Byrds, complete with strings and "scratches"."

=== Music video ===
The black-and-white music video for "You Showed Me" was directed by Pedro Romhanyi.

=== Track listing ===
CD single, UK (1997)
No.	Title	Length
1.	"You Showed Me" (Radio Edit)	3:32
2.	"You Showed Me" (Tee's Alternative Mix)	3:29
3.	"You Showed Me" (Tee's Club Mix)	7:29
4.	"You Showed Me" (Tee's Freeze Mix)	7:24
5.	"You Showed Me" (TNT's Frozen Dub)	7:46
6.	"You Showed Me" (Bonus Beats)	4:06
7.	"You Showed Me" (Tee's Radio)	3:26

=== Charts ===
==== Weekly charts ====
Chart (1997)	Peak position
Europe (Eurochart Hot 100)	42
Iceland (Íslenski Listinn Topp 40)	4
Israel (Israeli Singles Chart)	17
Italy Airplay (Music & Media)	6
Latvia (Latvijas Top 50)	9
Scottish Singles Sales (Official Charts)	13
UK Singles (Official Charts)	8

==== Year-end charts ====
Chart (1997)	Position
Latvia (Latvijas Top 50)	138
UK Singles (OCC)	159

== Madison Beer version ==
"Showed Me (How I Fell in Love with You)"

Single by Madison Beer

from the album Silence Between Songs
- Released: October 14, 2022
- Genre: Psychedelic pop; neo-soul
- Length: 3:16
- Label: Epic; Sing It Loud
- Songwriters: Beer; Dussolliet; Clampitt; Sommers; Harold Eugene Clark; James Roger McGuinn
- Producers: Madison Beer; Leroy Clampitt; Tim Sommers

Madison Beer singles chronology
"Dangerous" (2022)	"Showed Me (How I Fell in Love with You)" (2022)	"Home to Another One" (2023)

Madison Beer made a psychedelic pop and neo soul cover of the song, in a version with noticeable lyrical and musical differences to the original, and released it under the title of "Showed Me (How I Fell in Love with You)" (also known as just "Showed Me") on October 14, 2022, through Epic Records. It was the ninth track on Beer's second studio album, Silence Between Songs, and was the third single to be taken from the album.

=== Music video ===
The music video was directed by Lauren Dunn.

=== Charts ===
Chart (2023)	Peak position
UK Singles Downloads (Official Charts)	15

== Sampling and controversy ==
The Turtles' version features a gently rising and falling string section, which was sampled by U2 in 1997 for their song "The Playboy Mansion" on their album Pop. Madison Beer's song "Showed Me (How I Fell in Love with You)" for her album Silence Between Songs also sampled the Turtles' recording.

The American hip hop group De La Soul also sampled the Turtles' recording of "You Showed Me" for their song "Transmitting Live From Mars (Interlude)" on their 1989 album, 3 Feet High and Rising, but did not ask permission or clear the sample. The Turtles took litigation against the group, suing them for $1.7 million. An out-of-court settlement was reached for an undisclosed sum. It is said to be the first time that a hip hop act was ever sued for unethical use of another artist's music.

== Other cover versions ==
The song was covered by Québécois singer Claude Steben in French under the title "Vous" in 1972. The song has also been covered by Lutricia McNeal on her 2002 album, Metroplex. In addition, Kanye West based his song "Gorgeous", from his 2010 album My Beautiful Dark Twisted Fantasy, on elements derived from "You Showed Me". In 2011, the alternative country duo the Watson Twins offered a free download of their cover of "You Showed Me" on their website.
