= Blacks' Magic =

Studio album by Salt-N-Pepa
- Released: March 19, 1990
- Recorded: 1989–1990
- Studio: Bayside Sound (New York City); Soundtrack (New York City)
- Genre: Hip-hop
- Length: 52:48
- Label: Next Plateau; London
- Producer: Excalibur; Hurby Luv Bug; The Invincibles; Quicksilver; Salt; Spinderella; Steevee-O, The Boy Wonder

Salt-N-Pepa chronology
A Salt with a Deadly Pepa (1988)	Blacks' Magic (1990)	A Blitz of Salt-n-Pepa Hits (1990)

Singles from Blacks' Magic
- 1. "Expression" Released: November 13, 1989; 2. "Independent" Released: May 5, 1990; 3. "Do You Want Me" Released: February 1991; 4. "Let's Talk About Sex" Released: August 31, 1991; 5. "You Showed Me" Released: November 30, 1991; 6. "Expression '92" Released: March 12, 1992

Professional ratings
Review scores
Source	Rating
AllMusic	4.5/5 stars
Christgau's Consumer Guide	A−
Encyclopedia of Popular Music	3/5 stars
Entertainment Weekly	B+
Los Angeles Times	3/4 stars
Melody Maker	(favorable)
The Rolling Stone Album Guide	3/5 stars
Spin	(favorable)

Blacks' Magic is the third studio album by American hip-hop group Salt-N-Pepa. It was released through Next Plateau and London Records on March 19, 1990. For a critical and commercial success, the album peaked at number 38 on the US Billboard 200 and number 15 on the Top R&B/Hip-Hop Albums chart, and has been certified platinum by the Recording Industry Association of America (RIAA), denoting shipments in excess of one million copies in the United States. The album saw the release of six singles: "Expression" (#26 US, #23 UK), "I Don't Know (featuring Kid N' Play), "Independent", "Do You Want Me" (#31 US, #23 UK), "Let's Talk About Sex (#13 US, #2 UK and Top 5 in several other countries), and "You Showed Me" (#47 US, #15 UK).

== Track listing ==
All tracks are written by Fingerprints, except where noted.

No.	Title	Writer(s)	Producer(s)	Length
1.	"Expression"	Salt	Salt; Producer, Dana 'Dum' Mozie; Asst. Producer	4:04
2.	"Doper Than Dope"		Steevee-O, The Boy Wonder; The Invincibles	4:21
3.	"Negro wit' an Ego"		Hurby Luv Bug; The Invincibles	3:40
4.	"You Showed Me"	Fingerprints; Roger McGuinn; Gene Clark	Excalibur; The Invincibles	4:01
5.	"Do You Want Me"		Hurby Luv Bug; The Invincibles	4:52
6.	"Swift"		Steevee-O, The Boy Wonder; The Invincibles	4:04
7.	"I Like to Party"		Salt; Hurby Luv Bug; The Invincibles	3:51
8.	"Blacks' Magic"		Spinderella; The Invincibles	4:16
9.	"Start the Party"	James	Salt	3:51
10.	"Let's Talk About Sex"		Hurby Luv Bug; The Invincibles	3:33
11.	"I Don't Know"	Fingerprints; The Meters	Fingerprints; Art Neville; Joseph Modeliste; George Porter Jr.; Leo Nocentelli	3:11
12.	"Live and Let Die"		Quicksilver; The Invincibles	3:07
13.	"Independent"	James	Salt	4:46

== Personnel ==
Credits adapted from the liner notes of Blacks' Magic.

=== Salt-N-Pepa ===
- Salt
- Pepa
- Spinderella

=== Additional musicians ===
- Dante Basco - Rapping
- Jacci McGhee – special guest appearance (track 1)
- Joyce Martin – background vocals (track 4)
- Alpha – background vocals (tracks 5, 10)
- Omega – background vocals (tracks 5, 10)
- Hurby Luv Bug – background vocals (tracks 5, 10)
- Kid 'n Play – special guest appearance (track 11)
- Sybil – special guest appearance (track 13)
- Stanley Brown – all keyboards

=== Technical ===
- Salt – production (tracks 1, 7, 9, 13)
- Steevee-O, The Boy Wonder – production (tracks 2, 6)
- The Invincibles – production (tracks 2–8, 10–12)
- Hurby Luv Bug – production (tracks 3, 5, 7, 10, 11); album concept
- Excalibur – production (track 4)
- Spinderella – production (track 8)
- Quicksilver – production (track 12)
- Play – album concept
- Andre DeBourg – engineering
- Dana 'Dum' Mozie – engineering
- Herb "Pump" Powers – mastering

=== Artwork ===
- Charles Lilly – illustration
- Faville Graphics – design

== Charts ==
=== Weekly charts ===
Weekly chart performance for Blacks' Magic
Chart (1990)	Peak position
Australian Albums (ARIA)	149
Dutch Albums (Album Top 100)	65
UK Albums (OCC)	70
US Billboard 200	38
US Top R&B/Hip-Hop Albums (Billboard)	15

=== Year-end charts ===
Year-end chart performance for Blacks' Magic
Chart (1990)	Position
US Top R&B/Hip-Hop Albums (Billboard)	62

== Certifications ==
Certifications for Blacks' Magic
Region	Certification	Certified units/sales
United States (RIAA)	Platinum	1,000,000^{^}
^{^} Shipments figures based on certification alone.
