= Do You Want Me =

1990 single by Salt-n-Pepa

Single by Salt-N-Pepa

from the album Blacks' Magic
- B-side: "I Gotcha (Once Again)"
- Released: February 14, 1991
- Length: 3:50
- Label: Next Plateau; FFRR
- Songwriter: Fingerprints
- Producers: Hurby Luv Bug; The Invincibles

Salt-N-Pepa singles chronology
"Independent" (1989)	"Do You Want Me" (1991)	"Let's Talk About Sex" (1991)

"Do You Want Me" is a song by American R&B-hip hop group Salt-N-Pepa, released in February 1991 by Next Plateau and FFRR Records as the third single from their third album, Blacks' Magic (1990). It reached No. 21 on the US Billboard Hot 100 and charted at No. 5 on the UK Singles Chart. The song also peaked at No. 9 in Portugal, No. 16 in the Netherlands, and No. 19 in Australia.

== Track listings ==
- US 12-inch and maxi-cassette single

A1. "Do You Want Me" (vocal featuring Hurby Luv Bug) – 3:51
A2. "Do You Want Me" (vocal) – 3:51
B1. "I Gotcha (Once Again)" (LP version) – 3:53
B2. "Do You Want Me" (instrumental) – 3:48

- US cassette single

A. "Do You Want Me" (European radio remix) – 3:15
B. "Do You Want Me" (original version featuring Hurby Luv Bug) – 3:51

== Charts ==
=== Weekly charts ===
Chart (1991–1992)	Peak position
Australia (ARIA)	19
Belgium (Ultratop 50 Flanders)	30
Europe (Eurochart Hot 100)	22
Germany (GfK)	49
Ireland (IRMA)	22
Luxembourg (Radio Luxembourg)	7
Netherlands (Dutch Top 40)	20
Netherlands (Single Top 100)	16
New Zealand (Recorded Music NZ)	49
Portugal (AFP)	9
UK Singles (OCC)	5
UK Airplay (Music Week)	17
UK Dance (Music Week)	8
US Billboard Hot 100	21
US Dance Club Songs (Billboard)	26
US Dance Singles Sales (Billboard)	8
US Hot R&B/Hip-Hop Songs (Billboard)	32
US Hot Rap Songs (Billboard)	7

=== Year-end charts ===
Chart (1991)	Position
Australia (ARIA)	75
UK Singles (OCC)	58
US Billboard Hot 100	98
US 12-inch Singles Sales (Billboard)	47

== Certifications ==
Region	Certification	Certified units/sales
United States (RIAA)	Gold	500,000^{^}
^{^} Shipments figures based on certification alone.
