= Expression (song) =

1989 single by Salt-n-Pepa

Single by Salt-N-Pepa

from the album Blacks' Magic
- B-side: "Clubhouse"
- Released: November 13, 1989
- Genre: Hip hop
- Length: 4:04
- Label: Next Plateau
- Songwriter: Cheryl "Salt" James
- Producer: Cheryl "Salt" James

Salt-N-Pepa singles chronology
"Twist and Shout" (1988)	"Expression" (1989)	"Independent" (1990)

Music video
- "Expression" on YouTube

"Expression" is a song by American group Salt-N-Pepa, released in November 1989 by Next Plateau as the lead single from their third album, Blacks' Magic (1990). The song was both written and produced by member Cheryl "Salt" James. The song topped the US Billboard Hot Rap Singles chart, reached number 26 on the Billboard Hot 100, and entered the top 40 in France, Ireland, and the United Kingdom. The accompanying music video is notable for marking the directorial debut of director Millicent Shelton.

== Critical reception ==
Connie Johnson from Los Angeles Times remarked that "Expression" is written "with a power-to-the-individual emphasis", naming it "one of the wittiest rap tracks to emerge this year." Terry Staunton from NME wrote, "A bold experiment combining rap and lovers' rock with a built-in tribute to their favourite rappers near the end. This is going to be bloody massive, Top Ten in matter of minutes." Kim France from Spin described it as "a danceable, darn near perfect number that owes more than a touch to Chaka Khan's 84 proto-hip-house hit 'I Feel For You'."

== Commercial performance ==
"Expression" became Salt-N-Pepa's second single to reach the top 40 in the United States, peaking at number 28 on the Billboard Hot 100 while also topping the Billboard Hot Rap Singles chart, becoming their first song to do so. The single was certified platinum by the Recording Industry Association of America (RIAA). In 1992, a re-release as the first (and only) single from Salt-N-Pepa's remix album, Rapped in Remixes: The Greatest Hits Remixed, charted within the top 30 in Ireland and the United Kingdom and peaked at number 13 in France.

== Track listing ==
- A-side
1. "Expression" – 4:04
2. "Expression" (No Shorts mix) – 5:17
3. "Expression" (acappella) – 1:16
- B-side
1. "Expression" (instrumental) – 4:04
2. "Expression" (Bonus Beats) – 1:30
3. "Clubhouse" (vocal) – 5:29
4. "Clubhouse" (instrumental) – 5:29
- CD maxi-single (1992 release)
1. "Expression" (Hard Ecu Edit) – 3:59
2. "Expression" (Full Length Hard Ecu Mix) – 6:18
3. "Expression" (House mix) – 6:18
4. "Expression" (Tear the Roof Off the Sucker) – 5:46

== Charts ==
=== Weekly charts ===
Chart (1990)	Peak position
Europe (Eurochart Hot 100)	99
Italy Airplay (Music & Media)	1
Netherlands (Single Top 100)	76
UK Singles (Official Charts)	40
US Billboard Hot 100	26
US Dance Club Songs (Billboard)	32
US Dance Singles Sales (Billboard)	6
US Hot R&B/Hip-Hop Songs (Billboard)	8
US Hot Rap Songs (Billboard)	1

Chart (1992)	Peak position
Europe (European Dance Radio)	11
France (SNEP)	13
Ireland (IRMA)	23
UK Singles (Official Charts)	23
UK Airplay (Music Week)	21
UK Dance (Music Week)	12
UK Club Chart (Music Week)	61

=== Year-end charts ===
Chart (1990)	Position
US 12-inch Singles Sales (Billboard)	31
US Hot R&B Singles (Billboard)	63
US Hot Rap Singles (Billboard)	1

== Certifications ==
Region	Certification	Certified units/sales
United States (RIAA)	Platinum	1,000,000^{^}
^{^} Shipments figures based on certification alone.

== Release history ==
Region	Version	Date	Format(s)	Label(s)	Ref.
United States	Original	November 13, 1989	—N/a	Next Plateau	
United Kingdom	Brixton Bass mix	March 26, 1990	7-inch vinyl; 12-inch vinyl; cassette	Next Plateau; FFRR; London	
United Kingdom	Expression EP	April 30, 1990	12-inch vinyl	Next Plateau; FFRR; London	
Japan	Brixton Bass mix	June 1, 1990	CD	Next Plateau; FFRR; London	
Australia	Brixton Bass mix	June 4, 1990	7-inch vinyl; 12-inch vinyl; cassette	FFRR; Polydor	
Australia	Brixton Bass mix	June 18, 1990	CD	FFRR; Polydor	
United Kingdom	Hard Ecru mix	March 16, 1992	7-inch vinyl; 12-inch vinyl; CD; cassette	Next Plateau; FFRR	
