= Let's Talk About Sex =

1991 single by Salt-n-Pepa

Single by Salt-N-Pepa

from the album Blacks' Magic
- Released: August 6, 1991
- Genre: Hip house; dance; pop rap
- Length: 3:33
- Label: Next Plateau
- Songwriter: Hurby Azor
- Producers: Hurby Luv Bug; the Invincibles

Salt-N-Pepa singles chronology
"Do You Want Me" (1990)	"Let's Talk About Sex" (1991)	"You Showed Me" (1992)

Music video
- "Let's Talk About Sex" on YouTube

"Let's Talk About Sex" is a song by American hip hop trio Salt-N-Pepa, released in August 1991, by Next Plateau Records, as the fourth single from their third studio album, Blacks' Magic (1990). It was written and co-produced by Hurby Azor, and achieved great success in many countries, including Australia, Austria, Germany, Luxembourg, the Netherlands, Portugal, Switzerland and Zimbabwe where it was a number-one hit. Its accompanying music video was directed by Millicent Shelton. In 1992, "Let's Talk About Sex" earned a nomination in the category for Best Rap Performance by a Duo or Group at the Grammy Award.

== Content ==
The song talks about safe sex, the positive and negative sides of sex and the censorship that sex had around that time in American mainstream media. The song was later included in the trio's Greatest Hits (2000) album. It samples "I'll Take You There" by the Staple Singers. An alternate version of the song entitled "Let's Talk About AIDS" was released to radio on a promotional single and included as a B-side on various singles for the song. The lyrics were changed to more directly address the spread of AIDS and HIV.

== Chart performances and awards ==
The song was certified gold by the RIAA and peaked at No. 13 at the US Billboard Hot 100 chart. In the purely sales-based UK Singles Chart, the song hit No. 2, and in the German singles chart, the song hit No. 1, the first original song by an American hip-hop act to achieve that feat. It also hit No. 1 in the Australian ARIA Singles Chart.

In 1992, the song was nominated for a Grammy Award for Best Rap Performance by a Duo or Group.

== Critical reception ==
The song received favorable reviews from many music critics. Steve Huey from AllMusic called it a "playful safe-sex anthem". Larry Flick from Billboard magazine stated that the "hot rap divas show no sign of cooling off with this spicy hip-hopper that pokes fun at people with inhibitions about sex." He remarked that "cheeky rhymes and charming demeanors make this yet another multiformat winner." DeVaney and Clark from Cashbox commented, "Although they have changed their style from their original hip-hop image to commercial/R&B/Rap, the sound of this single is quite catchy and will probably take R&B by storm." They also concluded, "This single, by far, is one of the most commercial rap cuts of the year."

David Thigpen from Entertainment Weekly described it as "an articulate, funny, and danceable primer on sex and the single flygirl that hit male-dominated hip-hop where it hurt." A reviewer from Melody Maker wrote, "It's one of the most uncompromising safe sex raps ever written. The song also recoginises the biological differences between males and females, and the serious messages are balanced by a cheeky, never ribald, sense of humour. Their concern is genuine. It is, as they say, largely about understanding." Kim France from Spin felt that "Let's Talk About Sex" "packs a wallop with the kind of sassy, seducto-humor the two previous Salt-N-Pepa records were chock full of."

== Music video ==
The music video for "Let's Talk About Sex", directed by American director Millicent Shelton and designed by visual artist and designer Ron Norsworthy, starts in a black-and-white scene with a girl turning on a radio and listening to the song. Then she starts kissing her boyfriend and scenes of Salt-n-Pepa and other couples kissing and hugging are shown. Next the video colorizes when Salt-n-Pepa are shown dancing. Another version of the video has a scene in which a skeleton is shown after the word 'AIDS' with a stamp saying 'censored' in its mouth.

== Track listings ==
- 7-inch single
1. "Let's Talk About Sex!" (True Confessions edit) – 3:32
2. "Let's Talk About Sex!" (Super Crispy Mix) – 4:39
- CD maxi
1. "Let's Talk About Sex!" (True Confessions edit) – 3:32
2. "Let's Talk About Sex!" (Original Recipe mix) – 4:42
3. "Let's Talk About Sex!" (Super Crispy mix) – 4:39
4. "Do You Want Me" (Techno Philly Mix) – 6:31

== Charts ==
=== Weekly charts ===
Chart (1991–1992)	Peak position
Australia (ARIA)	1
Austria (Ö3 Austria Top 40)	1
Belgium (Ultratop 50 Flanders)	1
Canada Top Singles (RPM)	24
Canada Dance/Urban (RPM)	3
Denmark (IFPI)	5
Europe (Eurochart Hot 100)	2
Europe (European Dance Radio)	2
Europe (European Hit Radio)	11
Finland (Suomen virallinen lista)	8
France (SNEP)	11
Germany (GfK)	1
Ireland (IRMA)	4
Israel (Israeli Singles Chart)	6
Luxembourg (Radio Luxembourg)	1
Netherlands (Dutch Top 40)	1
Netherlands (Single Top 100)	1
New Zealand (Recorded Music NZ)	3
Norway (VG-lista)	3
Portugal (AFP)	1
Sweden (Sverigetopplistan)	2
Switzerland (Schweizer Hitparade)	1
UK Singles (Official Charts)	2
UK Airplay (Music Week)	18
UK Dance (Music Week)	7
UK Club Chart (Record Mirror)	55
US Billboard Hot 100	13
US Dance Club Songs (Billboard)	6
US Dance Singles Sales (Billboard)	6
US Hot R&B/Hip-Hop Songs (Billboard)	51
US Hot Rap Songs (Billboard)	12
US Cash Box Top 100	34
Zimbabwe (ZIMA)	1

=== Year-end charts ===
Chart (1991)	Position
Belgium (Ultratop)	42
Canada Dance/Urban (RPM)	25
Germany (Media Control)	50
Netherlands (Dutch Top 40)	13
Netherlands (Single Top 100)	6
Sweden (Topplistan)	33
UK Singles (OCC)	14

Chart (1992)	Position
Australia (ARIA)	48
Austria (Ö3 Austria Top 40)	18
Europe (Eurochart Hot 100)	51
Germany (Media Control)	14
New Zealand (RIANZ)	23
Sweden (Topplistan)	43
Switzerland (Schweizer Hitparade)	19

== Certifications ==
Region	Certification	Certified units/sales
Australia (ARIA)	Platinum	70,000^{^}
Austria (IFPI Austria)	Gold	25,000^{*}
Netherlands (NVPI)	Gold	75,000^{^}
United Kingdom (BPI)	Silver	200,000^{^}
United States (RIAA)	Gold	500,000^{^}
^{*} Sales figures based on certification alone.^{^} Shipments figures based on certification alone.

== Release history ==
Region	Date	Format(s)	Label(s)	Ref.
United States	August 6, 1991	12-inch vinyl; cassette	Next Plateau	
United Kingdom	August 19, 1991	7-inch vinyl; 12-inch vinyl; cassette	FFRR	
Australia	November 11, 1991	12-inch vinyl; CD; cassette	FFRR; Polydor	

== See also ==
- Safe sex
- 1991 in music
