= Sucker Free City =

- British DVD cover
- Genre: Crime drama
- Written by: Alex Tse
- Directed by: Spike Lee
- Starring: Ben Crowley; Ken Leung; Anthony Mackie
- Music by: Terence Blanchard
- Country of origin: United States
- Original language: English

Production
- Executive producers: Spike Lee; Sam Kitt
- Producer: Preston Holmes
- Cinematography: Cesar R. Charlone
- Editor: Barry Alexander Brown
- Running time: 113 minutes
- Production company: 40 Acres and a Mule Filmworks

Original release
- Network: Showtime
- Release: September 16, 2004

Sucker Free City is a 2004 American crime drama television film directed by Spike Lee and written by Alex Tse. The film examines white, black, and Chinese characters in San Francisco and the conflicts they encounter with each other. The film was intended to be the pilot for a Showtime television series, but Showtime declined to pick up the series. The film was first screened at the Toronto International Film Festival and was subsequently broadcast on Showtime.

The title of the film derives from "Sucka Free", a slang term in reference to the city often used by natives of Hunters Point and The Fillmore. The term was popularized by the rappers San Quinn, JT the Bigga Figga (who has a cameo in the film) and most notably the song "Sucka Free" from Rappin' 4-Tay's 1994 album Don't Fight the Feelin'.

== Synopsis ==
The film follows three young men as they are drawn into lives of crime. Nick uses his entry-level corporate job to commit credit card fraud and deals drugs on the side. K-Luv is a member of the "V-Dubs" ("Visitacion Valley Mafia"), an African-American street gang. Lincoln is a rising figure in the Chinese mafia.

Gentrification forces Nick's family to move out of their home in the Mission District into Hunter's Point, where they are harassed by the V-Dubs. K-Luv's side business of selling bootleg compact discs leads him to enlist Nick's help to bootleg CDs and to negotiate a truce with Lincoln. Lincoln conducts an affair with his boss's daughter Angela, a Stanford student engaged to medical student classmate Edwin.

== Cast ==
- Ben Crowley as Nick Wade
- Ken Leung as Lincoln Ma
- Anthony Mackie as Keith "K-Luv"
- Darris Love as "Sleepy"
- Laura Allen as Samantha Wade
- T. V. Carpio as Angela Tsing
- Kathy Baker as Cleo Wade
- James Hong as Kwok
- Lamont Bentley as Ahmir
- Ewan Chung as Edwin Leong
- Omari Hardwick as Dante Ponce
- Marguerite Moreau as Jessica Epstein
- Judy Pace as Mama June
- Emilio Rivera as Detective Zepada
- John Savage as Anderson Wade
- Eddie Shin as Michael
- Malieek Straughter as Leon
- Jim Brown as Don Strickland
- George Cheung as Mr. Tsing
- Chi Moui Lo as Tuk
- Milo Stokes as "Lil O"
- JT the Bigga Figga as "Killa Ski"
