= Matthew Ross (filmmaker) =

Journalist, and writer & director of Frank & Lola

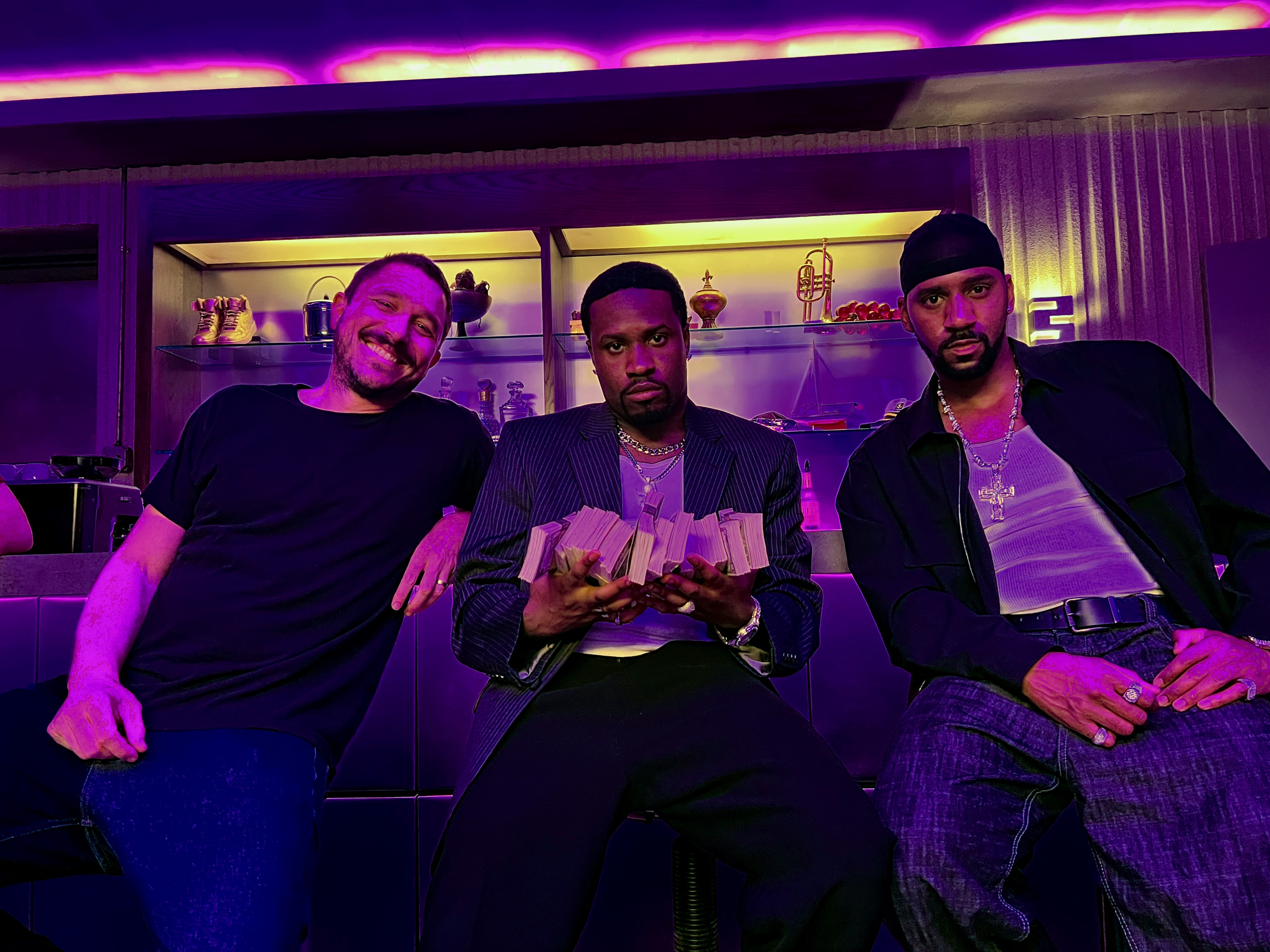
- Ross, Shameik Moore and Siddiq Saunderson on the set of Wu-Tang: An American Saga in 2022.
- Born: Matthew Ross; July 10, 1976 (age 50); New York City, New York
- Other name: Matthew M. Ross
- Occupations: film director, screenwriter, journalist, fiction writer
- Years active: 1997–present
- Notable work: Frank & Lola
- Website: www.lolafilm.net

Matthew Ross is an American film director, screenwriter, journalist and fiction writer based in Harlem. He is best known for writing and directing Frank & Lola, which debuted at the 2016 Sundance Film Festival and was later released by Universal Studios, and for directing multiple episodes of Wu-Tang: An American Saga.

== Early life ==
Born and raised in New York City, Ross attended Harvard University, where he graduated Cum Laude with Honors with a degree in Visual and Environmental Studies, concentrating in filmmaking. His senior thesis film Here Comes Your Man earned Magna Cum Laude Plus honors and was selected for a number of international film festivals.

== Journalism career ==
Ross began his career as a film journalist. His first staff position of note was as a film reporter for Variety in 2000. At the age of 25, he was hired as the senior editor of Indiewire, overseeing the site's editorial coverage as well as writing a regular industry column, followed by four years as the managing editor of Filmmaker magazine. Ross expanded his focus beyond film, writing pieces that ranged from feature profiles of MMA champions for FIGHT! magazine to long-form investigative journalism for Playboy. As a freelancer, his work has appeared in The Village Voice, Nerve, The Criterion Collection, and dozens of other publications.

== Film and television career ==
Ross began making films in college, including the festival shorts Here Comes Your Man, A Hero's Welcome, Curtis and Clover, Lola, and Red Angel. Another short he made was Inspired By Bret Easton Ellis, commissioned by Ellis and described by critic Roger Ebert as "one terrific video!". He also directed, wrote and produced a nonfiction viral series about professional fighters, FIGHT! Life!, which logged over eight-million YouTube views as of 2019.

Ross's first screenplay Plays Well with Others (co-written with Guy Cimbalo) was optioned by the production company Anonymous Content. He also worked as a story consultant on Curb Your Enthusiasm, including contributing plot lines to "Palestinian Chicken," winner of the 2011 DGA Award for "Best Comedy Episode".

=== Frank & Lola ===
Frank & Lola marked Ross' directorial debut. In 2014, backed by Parts and Labor Films' producers Jay Van Hoy and Lars Knudsen, Killer Films' Christine Vachon and David Hinojosa, producer John Baker, Preferred Content's Kevin Iwashina and Las Vegas-based production company Lola Pictures, the film began production, with Michael Shannon (Frank) and Imogen Poots (Lola) in the lead roles. The other major parts were played by Michael Nyqvist (Alan), Justin Long (Keith), Rosanna Arquette (Patricia), and Emmanuelle Devos (Claire).

The film had its premiere at the 2016 Sundance Film Festival, where it received largely positive reviews. Universal Studios secured its worldwide rights (with the exception of a few minor territories) for over $2 million, with a theatrical release planned for later that year. The film was released theatrically and on VOD in the U.S. on December 9, 2016.

=== Wu-Tang: An American Saga ===
In 2021, Ross was hired by showrunners RZA and Alex Tse to direct an episode of Hulu's Wu-Tang: An American Saga, the origin story of hip-hop legends the Wu-Tang Clan, set in 1990s New York City. Ross returned the following year to direct two episodes in the show's third and final season.

On February, 2023, at a sold-out event at New York’s 92nd Street Y, RZA and Tse selected Ross’s episode “Criminology” (Season 3, Episode 6), to represent the entire series. During a Q&A with host Sway Calloway following the screening, RZA compared Ross's cinematic technique to the work of director Martin Scorsese.

=== Other work ===
Ross wrote for the ABC series Nashville (writing two episodes and serving as creative consultant for Season 5). He also directed the feature Siberia in 2018.

== Fiction writing ==
In September 2022, Neotext published JUNKMAN, Ross's first book, a sci-fi novella collaboration with legendary comics artist Joe Staton.

== Filmography ==
Year	Title	Role
1997	A Hero's Welcome (short)	Director, Editor, Writer
1998	Here Comes Your Man (short)	Director, Editor, Writer, Cinematographer
2001	Curtis & Clover (short)	Director, Writer, Producer
2006	Lola (short)	Director, Writer
2006	Red Angel (short)	Director, Writer (adapted from the play by Eric Bogosian)
2009–2010	FIGHT! Life (nonfiction viral series)	Director, Writer, Producer
2010	Inspired By Bret Easton Ellis (short)	Director, Writer, Cinematographer
2011	Curb Your Enthusiasm (TV series)	Story Consultant
2016	Frank & Lola (feature film)	Director, Writer
2017	Nashville (TV series)	Writer (2 episodes), Creative Consultant (11 episodes)
2018	Siberia (feature film)	Director
2021–23	Wu-Tang: An American Saga (TV series)	Director (3 episodes)
