= David Atrakchi =

Croatian actor

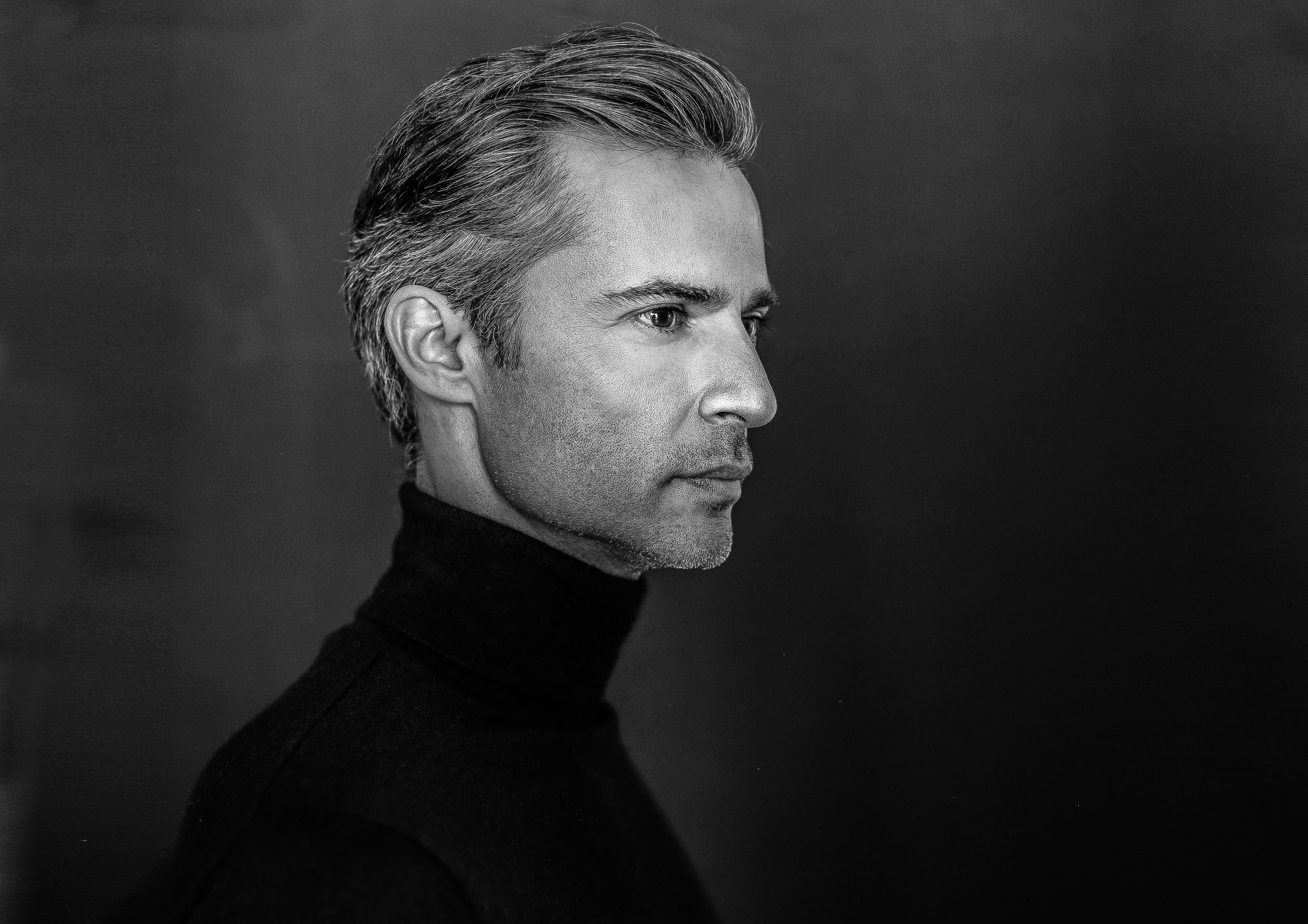
- Born: 10 December 1977 (age 48); Yugoslavia
- Occupation: Actor

David Atrakchi (born 10 December 1977) is a Croatian and French actor best known for his role of Malcolm Manville in Transporter 3. He played Lanyon in the 2011 thriller Faces in the Crowd. He was an actor and co-producer of Frank & Lola, a 2016 noir love story written and directed by Matthew Ross. Atrakchi is featured as an android in Detroit: Become Human, a 2018 adventure game developed by Quantic Dream released worldwide in May 2018.

In 2019, he produced the French portion of Prentice Penny's feature Uncorked for Netflix with Mandalay Pictures.

== Biography ==
Born in Yugoslavia, Atrakchi spent his childhood in Opatija and Baghdad, Iraq. Now based between Los Angeles and Paris, he studied theatre, dramatic arts and film at New York University with esteemed acting coach Jack Waltzer. In 2005 he became one of the founding partners of the French film production company and artists collaborative FullDawa Films. He has directed & produced several short films as well as a documentary for UNESCO titled A World for Inclusion featuring Philip Seymour Hoffman.

With his company FullDawa Films, he has handled the production services and coproduced the feature films, My Old Lady by Israël Horovitz and Frank & Lola a Sundance premiere in 2016.

== Film career ==
Atrakchi's first lead role was in the independent film Broken Idyll by Victoria Raiser. In 2008, he appeared as Malcolm Manville alongside Jason Statham and François Berléand in Transporter 3 by Olivier Megaton, produced and written by Luc Besson. Later Atrakchi appeared in a series of 5 short films for Tag Heuer -Meridiist by director Pierre Morel.

In 2010, he shot for Fred Vargas book adaptation "Un Lieu Incertain" by Josée Dayan, starring alongside Jean-Hugues Anglade, Charlotte Rampling and Pascal Greggory. The same year Atrakchi filmed Faces in the Crowd in Canada.

In spring 2011, he shot for Blind Watching in Portugal by Andrzej Jakimowski with Alexandra Maria Lara and Edward Hogg and two episodes for Canal+ in Prague as "Yves d'Allègre" in Borgia written by Tom Fontana with John Doman. Atrakchi shot in November 2011 "Au Nom D'Athènes" a 2X52' for the network Arte as Xerxes with Persian dialogue. The same year he was shooting for HBO in Toronto throughout May 2012, Transporter: The Series directed by Bruce McDonald (director).

In 2013, Atrakchi starred and produced Camille Delamarre's directorial debut film Last Call. He receives several acting nominations and one acting award at the Festival du film de Vendôme for Pour la France directed by Shanti Masud.

He also acted and co-produced Frank & Lola a 2016 noir love story written and directed by Matthew Ross.

== Honours and awards ==
- 2013 acting award at the Festival du film de Vendôme for Pour la France directed by Shanti Masud
