= Ain't No Playa (Playaz Shit) =

Single by Rappin' 4-Tay featuring Passion

from the album Off Parole
- B-side: "Still Phuckin' Wit My Folks"
- Released: February 13, 1996
- Recorded: 1995–1996
- Genre: G-funk; West Coast hip hop
- Length: 5:02
- Label: Chrysalis Records
- Songwriters: Anthony Forté; Stan Keith; Shannon Lacy
- Producer: G-Man Stan

Rappin' 4-Tay singles chronology
| "I'll Be Around" (1995) | "Ain't No Playa" (1996) | "A Lil' Some'em Some'em" (1996) |

"Ain't No Playa (Playaz Shit)" (Also known by its censored title "Ain't No Playa Like...") is the lead single released from Rappin' 4-Tay's third album, Off Parole. The song's instrumentation was written and performed by Shannon Lacy and produced by Stan "G-Man Stan" Keith and featured rapper/singer Passion performing the song's chorus, which reinterpreted The Four Tops 1973 hit "Ain't No Woman (Like the One I've Got)".

Though not as successful as his previous two singles, the song nevertheless became a minor hit on the Billboard Hot 100, peaking at number 73. To date it remains his final single to reach the Hot 100.

== Single track listing ==
=== A-Side ===
1. "Ain't No Playa" (Radio Version) – 4:13
2. "Ain't No Playa" (Album Version) – 5:03
3. "Ain't No Playa" (Video Version) – 4:13

=== B-Side ===
1. "Ain't No Playa" (Instrumental) – 5:03
2. "Still Phuckin' Wit My Folks" – 4:44

== Chart history ==
| Chart (1996) | Peak position |
|---|---|
| Billboard Hot 100 | 73 |
| Billboard Hot R&B/Hip-Hop Singles & Tracks | 55 |
| Billboard Hot Rap Singles | 16 |
| Billboard Hot Dance Music/Maxi-Singles Sales | 37 |
| Billboard Rhythmic Top 40 | 38 |
