= Players Club =

Players Club may refer to:

- The Players Club, 1998 film
  - The Players Club (soundtrack)
- The Players (New York City), known as the Players Club
- "Playaz Club", single by Rappin' 4-Tay from the 1994 album Don't Fight the Feelin'
- "Players Club", song by Rae Sremmurd from the 2018 album SR3MM
- The Players Club (record label), a sub-label for Mascot Label Group
- Players Club, a casino membership discount service offered by Players International
