= I'll Be Around (Rappin' 4-Tay song) =

1995 single by Rappin' 4-Tay

Single by Rappin' 4-Tay featuring the Spinners

from the album Don't Fight the Feelin'
- B-side: "Just Cause I Called You a Bitch"
- Released: March 7, 1995
- Length: 4:26
- Label: Chrysalis
- Songwriters: Anthony Forté; Thom Bell; Phill Hurtt
- Producers: Cyrus Esteban; Franky J

Rappin' 4-Tay singles chronology
"Playaz Club" (1994)	"I'll Be Around" (1995)	"Ain't No Playa (Playaz Shit)" (1996)

"I'll Be Around" is the second single released from American rapper Rappin' 4-Tay's second album, Don't Fight the Feelin' (1994). The song both samples the music and retains the original chorus of the Spinners' song of the same name, though Rappin' 4-Tay replaced the song's original lyrics with his own. The Spinners were credited as featured artists, and songwriters Thom Bell and Phil Hurtt were both given writing credits.

The song became 4-Tay's second consecutive top-40 single in the United States, peaking at number 39 on the Billboard Hot 100 and number five on the Hot Rap Singles chart, becoming his biggest hit on that chart. It also reached number one in New Zealand and number 30 on the UK Singles Chart. The single became the Spinners' last top-40 hit in both the US and UK, 34 years after their first, "That's What Girls Are Made For" (1961).

== Charts ==
=== Weekly charts ===
Chart (1995)	Peak position
Australia (ARIA)	58
Europe (Eurochart Hot 100)	75
France (SNEP)	44
Iceland (Íslenski Listinn Topp 40)	12
New Zealand (Recorded Music NZ)	1
Scottish Singles Sales (Official Charts)	53
UK Singles (Official Charts)	30
UK Dance (Official Charts)	17
UK Hip Hop/R&B (Official Charts)	5
US Billboard Hot 100	39
US Hot R&B Singles (Billboard)	37
US Hot Rap Songs (Billboard)	6
US Maxi-Singles Sales (Billboard)	32
US Top 40/Rhythm-Crossover (Billboard)	16

=== Year-end charts ===
Chart (1995)	Position
Iceland (Íslenski Listinn Topp 40)	91
New Zealand (RIANZ)	12
US Hot Rap Singles (Billboard)	47

== Certifications ==
Region	Certification	Certified units/sales
New Zealand (RMNZ)	Gold	5,000^{*}
^{*} Sales figures based on certification alone.
