= Watchmen (2009 film) =

2009 American film by Zack Snyder

- Theatrical release poster
- Directed by: Zack Snyder
- Screenplay by: David Hayter; Alex Tse
- Based on: Watchmen by Dave Gibbons (Note: The graphic novel's author and co-creator, Alan Moore, personally chose to remove his name from the credits, presumably due to his dissatisfaction with Warner Bros. and DC Comics.)
- Produced by: Lawrence Gordon; Lloyd Levin; Deborah Snyder
- Starring: Malin Åkerman; Billy Crudup; Matthew Goode; Carla Gugino; Jackie Earle Haley; Jeffrey Dean Morgan; Patrick Wilson
- Cinematography: Larry Fong
- Edited by: William Hoy
- Music by: Tyler Bates
- Production companies: Warner Bros. Pictures; Paramount Pictures; Legendary Pictures; DC Comics; Lawrence Gordon/Lloyd Levin Productions; Cruel and Unusual Films
- Distributed by: Warner Bros. Pictures (North America); Paramount Pictures (International)
- Release dates: February 23, 2009 (Odeon Leicester Square); March 6, 2009 (United States)
- Running time: 162 minutes
- Country: United States
- Language: English
- Budget: $130–150 million (Note: Attributed to multiple sources.)
- Box office: $187 million

Watchmen is a 2009 American superhero film based on the comic book series by Dave Gibbons and Alan Moore, (Note: The graphic novel's author and co-creator, Alan Moore, chose to have his name removed from the credits.) and published by DC Comics. Directed by Zack Snyder, and written by David Hayter and Alex Tse, the film stars Malin Åkerman, Billy Crudup, Matthew Goode, Carla Gugino, Jackie Earle Haley, Jeffrey Dean Morgan, and Patrick Wilson. A dark and dystopian deconstruction of the superhero genre, the film is set in an alternate history in the year 1985 at the height of the Cold War, as a group of mostly retired American superheroes investigate the murder of one of their own before uncovering an elaborate and deadly conspiracy with which they are all connected.

For nearly two decades from October 1987 until October 2005, a live-action film adaptation of the Watchmen series became stranded in development hell. Producers Lawrence Gordon and Joel Silver began developing the project at 20th Century Fox, later moving it to Warner Bros. Pictures, the sister company of Watchmen publisher DC Comics, and hiring director Terry Gilliam, who eventually left the production and deemed the complex comic "unfilmable". During the 2000s, Gordon and Lloyd Levin collaborated with Universal Pictures, Revolution Studios and Paramount Pictures to produce the film. Directors David Hayter, Darren Aronofsky, and Paul Greengrass were attached to the project before it was canceled over budget disputes. In October 2005, the project returned to Warner Bros., where Snyder was hired to direct. Paramount remained as its international distributor, whereas Warner Bros. would distribute the film in the United States. However, Fox sued Warner Bros. for copyright violation arising from Gordon's failure to pay a buy-out in 1991, which enabled him to develop the film at the other studios. Fox and Warner Bros. settled this before the film's release, with Fox receiving a portion of the gross. Principal photography began in Vancouver, in September 2007. As with his previous film 300 (2006), Snyder closely modeled his storyboards on the comic but chose not to shoot all of Watchmen using green screens and opted for real sets instead.

Following its world premiere at the Odeon Leicester Square in London on February 23, 2009, the film was released in the United States on March 6, by Warner Bros. Pictures. The film underperformed at the box office, grossing $187 million against a production budget of $130–138 million. Greg Silverman (former Warner Bros. executive) said that the film did later become profitable through streaming and home video sales.

The film received mixed reviews from critics, who praised the striking visuals and the faithfulness to the source material, but criticized the complexity of the plot. A DVD based on elements of the Watchmen universe was released, including an animated adaptation of the Tales of the Black Freighter comic within the story voiced by Gerard Butler and a fictional documentary titled Under the Hood detailing the older generation of superheroes from the film's backstory. A director's cut with 24 minutes of additional footage was released in July 2009. The "Ultimate Cut" edition incorporated the animated comic Tales of the Black Freighter into the narrative as it was in the original graphic novel, lengthening the runtime to 3 hours and 35 minutes, and was released on November 10, 2009. The director's cut is generally viewed as an improvement over the theatrical release.

== Plot ==
In 1985, a man living in a Manhattan apartment watches news about escalating Cold War tensions and the response from five-term President Richard Nixon when an unknown assailant attacks and hurls him to the street below. Throughout the opening credits, a montage reviews the rise of costumed crime-fighters from 1939 to 1977, culminating in public backlash and the passage of an anti-vigilante act.

Rorschach, a vigilante detective who operates illegally, discovers that the dead man was Edward Blake, better known as "the Comedian", a costumed hero who worked for the government. Suspecting that other vigilantes could be attacked, Rorschach warns members of his former team, the Watchmen. Rorschach's former partner Daniel Dreiberg believes he is paranoid, but relays his concerns to Adrian Veidt, a crime-fighter turned businessman, who also dismisses them. Rorschach later visits Doctor Manhattan, a physicist whose accidental superpowers make him a national security asset, but Manhattan is preoccupied with energy research and ignores him.

At Blake's funeral, Manhattan, Adrian and Daniel each recall the Comedian's pessimism in his later years about the Watchmen's mission. After the service, a lone mourner pays his respects. Rorschach tracks down and questions the mourner, former supervillain Edgar Jacobi. Jacobi says that Blake had recently broken into his apartment while he was sleeping — tearful, unmasked, and incoherent. Rorschach is astonished but doubts that Jacobi would tell a lie so bizarre. During a press interview with Doctor Manhattan, an investigative journalist tells him that several people who had been in contact with Manhattan have developed cancer, including his former girlfriend. As other reporters mob Manhattan with questions, he snaps and exiles himself to Mars. Alone, Manhattan reflects on his existence and his regrets at allowing himself to be turned into a weapon. In his absence, the Warsaw Pact countries make aggressive moves, and Nixon prepares for war.

Adrian survives an assassination attempt, suggesting that Rorschach's "mask-killer" theory is correct. Daniel takes in Laurie Jupiter, a second-generation vigilante and estranged lover of Manhattan, to whom Daniel is attracted. Rorschach's investigation of the assassin leads him back to Jacobi. Rorschach finds Jacobi dead and himself framed for Jacobi's murder. After a battle with police, Rorschach is arrested and unmasked as a low-born vagrant. In prison, Rorschach defends his vigilantism to a psychiatrist, saying he cannot ignore evil and the people who cause it. Daniel and Laurie, after donning their costumes and saving multiple people from a burning building, have sex. Imprisoned crime boss Big Figure stages a riot as a cover for assassinating Rorschach. The attack fails, and Rorschach kills Big Figure and his accomplices before leaving the prison with Daniel and Laurie who have arrived to break him out.

Manhattan teleports Laurie to Mars while Daniel joins Rorschach's investigation of the Blake murder. Evidence points them to Adrian as the mastermind; they find him at an Antarctic hideout, where he has just overseen the activation of Doctor Manhattan's energy reactors in New York City and other locations across the planet. On Mars, Laurie tries to convince Manhattan that humanity is worth saving. She succeeds only when he learns that Laurie is Blake's illegitimate daughter, a fact so unlikely (as Blake had once tried to rape Laurie's mother) that it restores his respect for life.

Adrian admits orchestrating Manhattan's exile, staging the assassination, framing Rorschach, and killing Blake, who was spying on his activities. He has also executed the final step of his plan: turning the world against Manhattan by rigging his reactors to explode, killing 15 million people. Manhattan returns with Laurie to a devastated New York, pieces together what has happened, and teleports to Adrian's hideout. After a brief struggle, Adrian shows him that the world's countries have put aside their rivalries to focus on a common enemy: Doctor Manhattan.

Realizing the logic of Adrian's plan, the Watchmen agree to keep his secret, except for Rorschach, whom Manhattan reluctantly kills to preserve the new global peace. Manhattan departs permanently for another galaxy while Daniel rebukes Adrian's moral sacrifice, and Laurie finally comes to terms with her parentage. A New York tabloid editor, frustrated by the lack of conflict to report on, tells a staff member to choose something from the "crank file", which is shown to contain Rorschach's journal.

== Cast and characters ==
The main characters of Watchmen (from left to right): The Comedian, Silk Spectre II, Doctor Manhattan, Ozymandias, Nite Owl II, and Rorschach

Production for Watchmen began casting in July 2007 for actors to double historical figures of the era—something director Zack Snyder declared would give the film a "satirical quality" and "create this '80s vibe". Snyder said he wanted younger actors because of the many flashback scenes, and it was easier to age actors with make-up rather than cast two actors in the same role. Snyder's son appears as a young Rorschach, while the director himself appears as an American soldier in Vietnam. Actor Thomas Jane was invited by Snyder, but declined to work in the film due to being too busy.

=== The Watchmen / The Crimebusters ===
- Malin Åkerman as Laurie Jupiter / Silk Spectre II:
  Åkerman described her character as a femme fatale as well as carrying the psychology and the emotion of the film. The actress worked out and trained to fight for her portrayal of the crime-fighter. In earlier attempts to make the film, Hilary Swank, Natalie Portman, Rachel Weisz, Jennifer Connelly, Kate Hudson, Milla Jovovich, and Jessica Alba were considered for the part of Laurie. According to Comic Book Resources, her characterisation (along with Nite Owl's) was changed from the original comics' model of gentle golden age heroes to one of a brutal fighter.
  - Haley Guiel as Young Laurie Jupiter
- Billy Crudup as Jon Osterman / Doctor Manhattan:
  The only member of the group with genuine superpowers, Doctor Manhattan is virtually omnipotent and works for the U.S. government. He is a scientist who suffered an accident in 1959, giving him superhuman powers. Crudup plays Osterman in flashbacks as a human and is replaced for his post-accident scenes with a motion-capture CG version of himself. During filming, Crudup acted opposite his co-stars, wearing a white suit covered in blue LEDs, so he would give off an otherworldly glow in real life, just as the computer-generated Manhattan does in the movie. His body was modeled on that of fitness model and actor Greg Plitt. The crew then 3D-digitized Crudup's head and "frankensteined it onto Greg Plitt's body." Snyder chose not to electronically alter Crudup's voice for Manhattan, explaining the character "would try and put everyone as much at ease as he could, instead of having a robotic voice that I think would feel off-putting." Keanu Reeves was also offered the role. Reeves was interested in the role but he ultimately passed.
  - Jaryd Heidrick as Young Jon Osterman
- Matthew Goode as Adrian Veidt / Ozymandias:
  A retired superhero who has since made his identity public. At first Snyder wanted Jude Law (a big fan of the character) for the part, but said that Goode was "big and tall and lean", which aided in bringing "this beautiful ageless, German superman" feel to the character. Goode interpreted Veidt's back-story to portray him with a German accent in private and an American one in public; Goode explained Veidt gave up his family's wealth and traveled the world, becoming a self-made man because he was ashamed of his parents' Nazi past, which in turn highlighted the themes of the American Dream and the character's duality. Snyder said Goode "fit the bill... We were having a hard time casting [the role], because we needed someone handsome, beautiful and sophisticated, and that's a tough combo." Tom Cruise was also interested in the part, and met with Snyder. However, Snyder revealed in 2024 that Cruise was more interested in the role of Rorschach, which had already been cast.
- Jackie Earle Haley as Walter Kovacs / Rorschach:
  A 45-year-old masked vigilante who continues his extralegal activities after they are outlawed. He takes his name from the Rorschach test, as the shifting black-and-white patterns on his mask resemble its inkblots. Unlike the other principal actors, Haley had read the comic as a young adult and was keen to pursue the role when he heard he had become a favorite candidate among fans. Rorschach wears a mask with ink blots: motion capture markers were put on the contours of Haley's blank mask for animators to create his ever-changing expressions. Haley has a black belt in kenpō but described Rorschach's attack patterns as sloppier and more aggressive due to the character's boxing background. Rorschach appears several times in the movie without his mask before he is apprehended, carrying a placard sign proclaiming, "The End is Nigh", but not until he is unmasked by the police is it made apparent that the sign bearer is Rorschach. Haley said that upon hearing of the casting of Rorschach, he actively sought the role. His agent came up with the idea that they should do a shoestring-budgeted audition tape of Haley wearing his own "little cheesy Halloween" Rorschach outfit. The entire audition was shot in the living room and kitchen of Haley's house. The tape was then sent to the film production crew, where Snyder watched it. After viewing the tape, Snyder cast Haley in the role of Rorschach, saying, "Very low-tech but awesomely acted. Clearly there was no other Rorschach."
  - Eli Snyder, director Zack Snyder's son, as Young Walter Kovacs
- Patrick Wilson as Daniel Dreiberg / Nite Owl II:
  A 40-year-old retired superhero with technological expertise. Snyder cast Wilson after watching 2006's Little Children, which also costars Haley. Wilson put on 25 pounds (11 kg) to play the overweight Dreiberg. He compared Dreiberg to a soldier who returns from war unable to fit into society. During several attempts to get Watchmen adapted as a film, Kevin Costner, Christopher Walken, and Richard Gere were each considered for the part. John Cusack, who is an admitted fan of the graphic novel, expressed great interest in playing the role. His character in the film is more brutal than in the original comic.

=== The Minutemen ===
- Carla Gugino as Sally Jupiter / Silk Spectre:
  A retired superheroine, mother of Laurie Juspeczyk and the first Silk Spectre. Gugino's character ages from 25 years old in the 1940s to 67 years old in the 1980s, and the then-37-year-old actress wore prosthetics to reflect the aging process. Gugino described her character's superhero outfit as "Bettie Page meets Alberto Vargas." In earlier attempts to make the film, Liv Tyler, Jamie Lee Curtis, Ann-Margret, Catherine Zeta-Jones, Winona Ryder, and Sigourney Weaver were considered for the part of Sally.
- Jeffrey Dean Morgan as Edward Blake / The Comedian:
  A superhero and a former member of the Minutemen who is commissioned by the U.S. government as a black-ops specialist. When reading the comic for the part, Morgan stopped when he saw his character was killed off three pages in. When telling his agent he did not want the part, he was told to continue reading it and find out how important his character was. Morgan found the role a challenge, explaining, "For some reason, in reading the novel, you don't hate this guy even though he does things that are unmentionable [like beat up and sexually assault Jupiter]. [...] My job is to kind of make that translate, so as a viewer you end up not making excuses to like him, but you don't hate him like you should for doing the things that he does." Of his casting, Snyder said, "It's hard to find a man's man in Hollywood. It just is. And Jeffrey came in and was grumpy and cool and grizzled, and I was, like, 'OK, Jeffrey is perfect!'"
- Stephen McHattie as Hollis Mason / Nite Owl:
  A retired former member and the first Nite Owl, Mason now owns and lives over an auto shop.
  - Clint Carleton as Young Hollis Mason
- Dan Payne as William Brady / Dollar Bill:
  A deceased member, Brady was a bank-sponsored member of The Minutemen who was created for publicity purposes. He dies during a bank robbery in 1947 when his cape is caught in the bank's revolving doors, allowing the robbers to shoot him at point-blank range.
- Niall Matter as Byron Lewis / Mothman:
  A former member, Lewis had a privileged upbringing and sought to help the less fortunate and fight oppression and corruption as a crime fighter. To this end, Lewis created a costume with special wings that helped him glide. His mental stability ultimately deteriorated after he was called before HUAC, leading to him being forcibly taken to a mental asylum.
- Apollonia Vanova as Ursula Zandt / The Silhouette:
  Deceased. A gun-toting vigilante, motivated by the deaths of her parents and sister at the hands of the Nazis in their native Austria. Zandt is killed along with her lesbian lover in what is implied to be a hate crime.
- Glenn Ennis as Hooded Justice:
  A deceased former member, H.J. was a violent vigilante who was trained in hand-to-hand combat.
- Darryl Scheelar as Nelson Gardner / Captain Metropolis:
  A former Marine Lieutenant, he was one of the more active members of the Minutemen, having organized its formation.

=== Other characters ===
- Matt Frewer as Edgar Jacobi / Moloch:
  A former supervillain. Moloch was jailed for a time during the 1970s. He is dying of cancer which he received from Adrian Veidt. Moloch was later murdered by Veidt, who frames Rorschach.
  - Mike Carpenter as Young Moloch
- Laura Mennell as Janey Slater:
  A scientist who was Osterman's first girlfriend until he fell for Laurie.
- Danny Woodburn as Tom Ryan / Big Figure
- Robert Wisden as Richard Nixon
- Frank Novak as Henry Kissinger
- Gary Houston as John McLaughlin
- Sean Allan and Garry Chalk as NORAD Generals
- Michael Kopsa as Paul Klein
- Chris Gauthier as Seymour David

Cameo roles include Jay Brazeau as a news vendor, Mark Acheson as a large man at Happy Harry's, Leah Gibson as Silhouette's girlfriend, Alessandro Juliani as a Rockefeller Military Base technician, Salli Saffioti as Annie Leibovitz, and Ted Cole as Dick Cavett.

== Production ==
In 1986, producers Lawrence Gordon and Joel Silver acquired film rights to Watchmen for 20th Century Fox. After author Alan Moore declined to write a screenplay based on his story, Fox enlisted screenwriter Sam Hamm. Hamm rewrote Watchmen's complicated ending, making a "more manageable" conclusion involving an assassination and a time paradox. Fox put the project into turnaround in 1991, and the project was moved to Warner Bros. Pictures, where Terry Gilliam was attached to direct and Charles McKeown to rewrite the script. Gilliam and Silver were only able to raise $25 million for the film, a quarter of the necessary budget, because their previous films had gone overbudget. Gilliam eventually left Watchmen, describing the comic as "unfilmable", and Warner Bros. dropped the project.

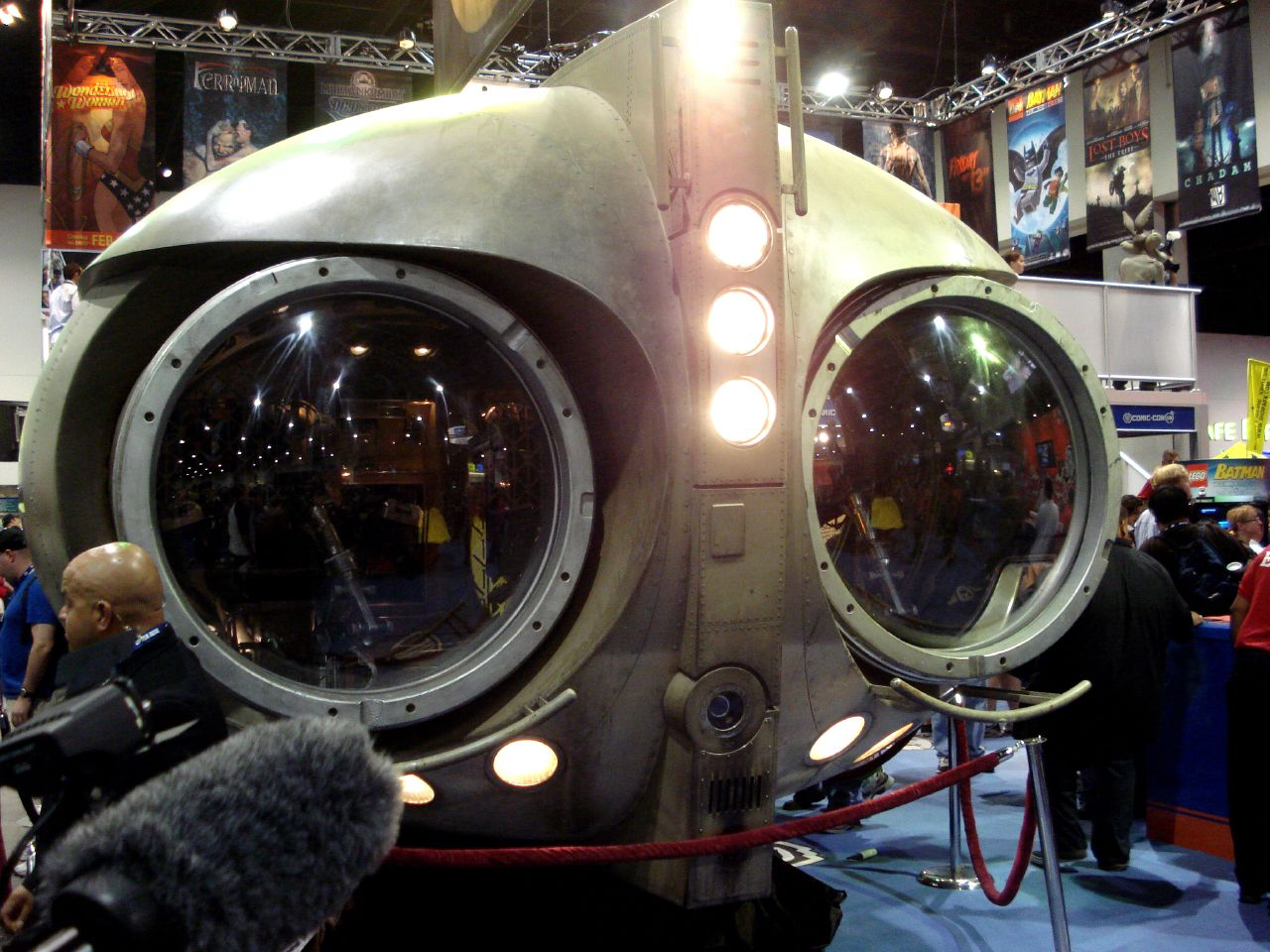
Archie, Nite Owl's airship, on display at the 2008 Comic-Con

In October 2001, Gordon partnered with Lloyd Levin and Universal Pictures, hiring David Hayter to write and direct. Hayter and the producers left Universal due to creative differences, and Gordon and Levin expressed interest in setting up Watchmen at Revolution Studios. The project did not hold together at Revolution Studios and subsequently fell apart. In July 2004, it was announced Paramount Pictures would produce Watchmen, and Michael Bay was considered to direct. Eventually, they attached Darren Aronofsky to direct Hayter's script. Producers Gordon and Levin remained attached, collaborating with Aronofsky's producing partner, Eric Watson. Paul Greengrass replaced Aronofsky when he left to focus on The Fountain. Ultimately, Paramount placed Watchmen in turnaround.

In October 2005, Gordon and Levin met with Warner Bros. once again to develop the project. Tim Burton at one point expressed interest in directing the film, but ultimately turned it down. Impressed with Zack Snyder's work on 300, Warner Bros. approached him to direct an adaptation of Watchmen. Screenwriter Alex Tse was hired to rewrite Hayter's script. He drew from his favorite elements of Hayter's script, and returned the story to the original Cold War setting of the Watchmen comic, in contrast to Hayter's script, which took place in modern times. Similar to his approach to 300, Snyder used the comic book as a storyboard. Following negotiations, Paramount, which had already spent $7 million in their failed project, earned the rights for international distribution of Watchmen and 25% of the film's ownership.

The fight scenes were extended, and a subplot about energy resources was added to make the film more topical. Although he intended to stay faithful to the look of the characters in the comic, Snyder intended Nite Owl to look scarier and made Ozymandias's armor into a parody of the rubber "muscle suits" from 1997's Batman & Robin. Production took place in Vancouver, where a New York City back lot was built. Sound stages were used for apartments and offices, while sequences on Mars and in Antarctica were shot against green screens. Filming started on September 17, 2007, and ended on February 19, 2008, on an estimated $120 million budget. To handle the 1,100 shots featuring visual effects, a quarter of them being computer-generated imagery, ten different effects companies were involved with Watchmen. 20th Century Fox filed a lawsuit to block the film's release on grounds of copyright infringements, citing agreements it had made with Lawrence Gordon. Ten weeks before the film's release date, a Federal judge ruled that Fox controlled its distribution rights. The studios settled three weeks later; Fox received an upfront payment and a percentage of the worldwide gross from the film and all sequels and spin-offs in return.

Dave Gibbons became an adviser on Snyder's film, but Moore has refused to have his name attached to any film adaptations of his work. Moore has stated he has no interest in seeing Snyder's adaptation; he told Entertainment Weekly in 2008, "There are things that we did with Watchmen that could only work in a comic, and were indeed designed to show off things that other media can't." While Moore believes that David Hayter's screenplay was "as close as I could imagine anyone getting to Watchmen," he asserted he did not intend to see the film if it were made.

Regarding the changed ending in which Dr. Manhattan is blamed for nuclear devastation instead of an extraterrestrial squid, Snyder "figured it took about 15 minutes to explain [the squid's appearance] correctly; otherwise, it's pretty crazy." By omitting the squid Snyder felt that he could give more time to explore and develop the existing characters. Oscar Gonzalez of CNET stated that "Because of this change, however, the movie is not canon in regards to the Watchmen TV series." Earlier drafts had Veidt die, but Snyder reversed this change.

== Music ==
Both a soundtrack and excerpts from Tyler Bates' film score were released as albums on March 3, 2009. The soundtrack features three songs written by Bob Dylan—"Desolation Row", "All Along the Watchtower", and "The Times They Are a-Changin'"—with only the latter performed by Dylan on the soundtrack. It includes some songs mentioned in the comic, such as Simon and Garfunkel's "The Sound of Silence" and Leonard Cohen's "Hallelujah". Dylan's "Desolation Row'" and "All Along the Watchtower" are also quoted in the graphic novel. Music by Philip Glass from Koyaanisqatsi plays when Doctor Manhattan is looking back on his life when he arrives on Mars. The Introitus of Mozart's Requiem appears at the end of the film. "Desolation Row" was covered by My Chemical Romance specially for the film, and the song plays in the end credits. The music video was directed by Snyder and features several in-universe references to Watchmen.

== Release ==
=== Marketing ===
Warner Bros. Interactive Entertainment published an American-only episodic video game to be released alongside the film called Watchmen: The End Is Nigh. Warner Bros. took this low-key approach to avoid rushing the game on such a tight schedule, as most games adapted from films are panned by critics and consumers. The game is set in the 1970s and is written by Len Wein, the comic's editor; Dave Gibbons is also an advisor. On March 4, 2009, Glu Mobile released Watchmen: The Mobile Game, a beat 'em up mobile game featuring Nite Owl and The Comedian fighting enemies in their respective settings of New York City and Vietnam. On March 6, 2009, a game for the Apple Inc. iPhone and iPod Touch platform was released, titled Watchmen: Justice is Coming. Though highly anticipated, this mobile title suffered from serious gameplay and network issues which have yet to be resolved.

As a promotion for the film, Warner Bros. Entertainment released Watchmen: Motion Comic, a series of narrated animations of the original comic book. The first chapter was released for purchase in the summer of 2008 on digital video stores, such as iTunes Store and Amazon Video on Demand. DC Direct released action figures based on the film in January 2009. Director Zack Snyder set up a YouTube contest petitioning Watchmen fans to create faux commercials of products made by the fictional Veidt Enterprises.

The producers released two short video pieces online, which were intended to be viral videos designed as fictional backstory pieces, with one being a 1970 newscast marking the tenth anniversary of the public appearance of Doctor Manhattan. The other was a short propaganda film promoting the Keene Act of 1977, which made it illegal to be a superhero without government support. An official viral marketing website, the New Frontiersman, is named after the tabloid magazine featured in the graphic novel and contains teasers styled as declassified documents.

After the trailer for the film premiered in July 2008, DC Comics president Paul Levitz said that the company had had to print more than 900,000 copies of Watchmen trade collection to meet the additional demand for the book that the advertising campaign had generated, with the total annual print run expected to be over one million copies. DC Comics reissued Watchmen #1 for the original cover price of $1.50 on December 10, 2008; no other issues are planned to be reprinted.

The teaser trailer was attached in July 2008 and debuted in November 2008.

=== Home media ===
Tales of the Black Freighter, a fictional comic within the Watchmen limited series, was adapted as a 26-minute, direct-to-video animated feature directed by Daniel DelPurgatorio and Mike Smith from Warner Premiere, Warner Bros. Animation, and Legendary titled Watchmen: Tales of the Black Freighter and released on March 24, 2009. It was originally included in the Watchmen script, but was changed from live-action footage to animation because of the $20 million it would have cost to film it in the stylized manner of 300 that Snyder wanted. This animated version, originally intended to be included in the final cut, was then cut because the film was already approaching a three-hour running time. Gerard Butler, who starred in 300, voices the Captain in the animated feature, having been promised a role in the live-action film that never materialized. Like the original live-action film itself, international rights to the Black Freighter film are held by Paramount Home Entertainment.

The Black Freighter releases also include Under the Hood, a 38-minute, fictional in-universe documentary detailing the characters' backstories, which takes its title from that of Hollis Mason's memoirs in the comic book. Unlike the film and Tales of the Black Freighter which were both R-rated, Under the Hood is PG-rated because it is meant to resemble a behind-the-scenes television news magazine profile of the characters. The actors themselves were allowed to improvise during filming interviews in character. Bolex cameras were even used to film faux archive footage of the Minutemen.

In addition, the 325-minute Watchmen: Motion Comic was released via Blu-ray, DVD, and digital video stores on March 3, 2009, as part of the Warner Premiere: Motion Comics series.

Warner released a 186-minute director's cut of the film, expanded from the 162-minute theatrical cut, on all formats on July 21, 2009. This was followed by the November 10, 2009, home video release of the 215-minute "Ultimate Cut". It comprises the director's cut with Tales of the Black Freighter edited in throughout, along with additional newsstand framing sequences. The Ultimate Cut was released on 4K UHD Blu-ray on July 19, 2016.

All DVD and Blu-ray editions of the three cuts come in various permutations, with varying quantities of extra features.

Watchmen debuted at the top of the rental, DVD, and Blu-ray charts. First week sales of the DVD stood at 1,232,725 copies, generating $24,597,425 in sales revenue. By November 1, 2009, the DVD had sold a total of 2,510,321 copies and made $46,766,383 in revenue.

As of 2022, it has made $152,601,532 from domestic DVD and Blu-ray sales.

Greg Silverman (former Warner Bros. executive) said that the film did eventually become profitable.

== Reception ==
=== Box office ===
Watchmen was released at midnight on March 5, 2009, and earned an estimated $4.6 million for the early showing, approximately twice as much as 300, Snyder's previous comic book adaptation, earned. The film earned $24,515,772 in 3,611 theaters during its first day, and later finished its opening weekend grossing $55,214,334. At that point, it had the biggest number of screenings for an R-rated film, breaking the previous record held by The Matrix Reloaded. Watchmen's opening weekend is the highest of any Alan Moore adaptation to date, and the income was also greater than the entire box office take of From Hell, which ended its theatrical run with $31,602,566.

Although the film finished with $55 million for its opening, while Snyder's previous adaptation 300 earned $70 million in its opening weekend, Warner Bros.' head of distribution, Dan Fellman, stated that the opening weekend success of the two films were not comparable because Watchmen's runtime was 45 minutes longer than 300, allowing for fewer showings a night. Watchmen pulled in $5.4 million at 124 IMAX screens, the second-largest IMAX opening at that time.

Following its first week at the box office, Watchmen saw a significant drop in attendance. By the end of its second weekend, the film brought in $17,817,301, finishing second on that weekend's box office chart. The 67.7% overall decrease was at the time of its release one of the highest for a major comic book film. Losing two-thirds of its audience from its opening weekend, the film finished second for the weekend of March 13–15, 2009. The film continued to drop about 60% in almost every subsequent weekend, leaving the top ten in its fifth weekend, and the top twenty in its seventh. Watchmen crossed the $100 million mark on March 26, its twenty-first day at the box office, and finished its theatrical run in the United States on May 28, having grossed $107,509,799 in 84 days. The film had grossed one fifth of its ultimate gross on its opening day, and more than half of that total by the end of its opening weekend.

Watchmen was the 31st-highest-grossing film of 2009, and the sixth-highest-grossing R-rated film of the year, behind The Hangover, Inglourious Basterds, District 9, Paranormal Activity, and It's Complicated. At the North American box office, Watchmen currently sits in the lower half of the forty-six films based on a DC Comics comic book, narrowly ahead of 1997's Batman & Robin.

Watchmen earned $26.6 million in 45 territories overseas; of these, Britain and France had the highest box office with an estimated $4.6 million and $2.5 million, respectively. Watchmen also took in approximately $2.3 million in Russia, $2.3 million in Australia, $1.6 million in Italy, and $1.4 million in South Korea. The film collected $77,873,014 in other territories, bringing its worldwide total to $185,382,813.

=== Critical response ===
On Rotten Tomatoes, Watchmen has a 65% approval rating based on 304 reviews, and an average rating of 6.4/10. The site's critical consensus reads: "Gritty and visually striking, Watchmen is a faithful adaptation of Alan Moore's graphic novel, but its complex narrative structure may make it difficult for it to appeal to viewers not already familiar with the source material." On Metacritic, which assigns a weighted average rating reviews from mainstream critics, the film has a score of 56 out of 100, based on 39 critics, indicating "mixed or average" reviews. Audiences polled by CinemaScore gave the film an average grade of "B" on an A+ to F scale; the primary audience was older men.

Patrick Kolan of IGN Australia awarded it a perfect 10/10 and wrote, "It's the Watchmen film you always wanted to see, but never expected to get." Roger Ebert gave it four out of four stars and wrote, "It's a compelling visceral film—sound, images and characters combined into a decidedly odd visual experience that evokes the feel of a graphic novel."

Richard Corliss of Time concluded, "this ambitious picture is a thing of bits and pieces," yet "the bits are glorious, the pieces magnificent." Jonathan Crocker of Total Film awarded it 4/5 stars, writing, "It's hard to imagine anyone watching the Watchmen as faithfully as Zack Snyder's heartfelt, stylised adap. Uncompromising, uncommercial, and unique." When comparing the film with the original source material, Ian Nathan of Empire felt that while "it isn't the graphic novel... Zack Snyder clearly gives a toss, creating a smart, stylish, decent adaptation." Nick Dent of Time Out Sydney gave the film 4 out of 5 in his review of February 25, praising the film's inventiveness but concluding:

While Watchmen is still as rich, daring, and intelligent an action film as there's ever been, it also proves Moore absolutely right [that Watchmen is inherently un-filmable]. As a comic book, Watchmen is an extraordinary thing. As a movie, it's just another movie, awash with sound and fury.

Some critics who wrote negative reviews disliked the film's use and depiction of the Cold War-period setting, stating that the film's attempt to use the 1980s fears that never came to pass felt dated, and that Snyder's slavish devotion to faithfully adapting the source material as literally as possible did not allow his work to exhibit a creative distinctiveness of its own, and that as a result, the film and its characters lacked vitality and authenticity. Philip Kennicott of The Washington Post, for example wrote, "Watchmen is a bore [...] It sinks under the weight of its reverence for the original." Devin Gordon wrote for Newsweek, "That's the trouble with loyalty. Too little, and you alienate your core fans. Too much, and you lose everyone—and everything—else."

Owen Gleiberman's Entertainment Weekly review reads, "Snyder treats each image with the same stuffy hermetic reverence. He doesn't move the camera or let the scenes breathe. He crams the film with bits and pieces, trapping his actors like bugs wriggling in the frame." "[Snyder] never pause[s] to develop a vision of his own. The result is oddly hollow and disjointed; the actors moving stiffly from one overdetermined tableau to another," said Noah Berlatsky of the Chicago Reader.

David Edelstein of New York agrees: "They've made the most reverent adaptation of a graphic novel ever. But this kind of reverence kills what it seeks to preserve. The movie is embalmed." Joe Morgenstern of The Wall Street Journal wrote, "Watching 'Watchmen' is the spiritual equivalent of being whacked on the skull for 163 minutes. The reverence is inert, the violence noxious, the mythology murky, the tone grandiose, the texture glutinous." Donald Clarke of The Irish Times was similarly dismissive: "Snyder, director of the unsubtle 300, has squinted hard at the source material and turned it into a colossal animated storyboard, augmented by indifferent performances and moronically obvious music cues."

The trade magazines Variety and The Hollywood Reporter were even less taken with the film. Justin Chang of Variety commented, "The movie is ultimately undone by its own reverence; there's simply no room for these characters and stories to breathe of their own accord, and even the most fastidiously replicated scenes can feel glib and truncated," and Kirk Honeycutt of The Hollywood Reporter writing, "The real disappointment is that the film does not transport an audience to another world, as 300 did. Nor does the third-rate Chandler-esque narration by Rorschach help...Looks like we have the first real flop of 2009."

Analyzing the divided response, Geoff Boucher of the Los Angeles Times felt that, like Eyes Wide Shut, The Passion of the Christ, or Fight Club, Watchmen would continue to be a talking point among those who liked or disliked the film. Boucher felt in spite of his own mixed feelings about the finished film, he was "oddly proud" that the director had made a faithful adaptation that was "nothing less than the boldest popcorn movie ever made. Snyder somehow managed to get a major studio to make a movie with no stars, no 'name' superheroes and a hard R-rating, thanks to all those broken bones, that oddly off-putting Owl Ship sex scene and, of course, the unforgettable glowing blue penis."

In 2023, director Christopher Nolan said that Snyder's version of Watchmen was ahead of its time and that it should have been released "post-Avengers". He added that "The idea of a superhero team, which it brilliantly subverts, wasn't a thing yet in movies."

=== Accolades ===
Watchmen was nominated for one award at the 2009 VES Awards, seven awards at the 36th Saturn Awards, and 13 awards at the 2009 Scream Awards. The film was also pre-nominated for the Academy Award for Best Visual Effects, although it did not make the final shortlist.

List of Awards
Award	Category	Recipient(s)	Result
36th Saturn Awards
36th Saturn Awards	Best Fantasy Film		Won
36th Saturn Awards	Best Director	Zack Snyder	Nominated
36th Saturn Awards	Best Supporting Actress	Malin Åkerman	Nominated
36th Saturn Awards	Best Writing	Alex Tse and David Hayter	Nominated
36th Saturn Awards	Best Costume	Michael Wilkinson	Won
36th Saturn Awards	Best Production Design		Nominated
36th Saturn Awards	Best Special Edition DVD Release	Watchmen: The Ultimate Cut	Won
2009 Scream Awards
2009 Scream Awards	Best Fantasy Film		Nominated
2009 Scream Awards	Best Supporting Actress	Carla Gugino	Nominated
2009 Scream Awards	Breakout Performance-Female	Malin Åkerman	Nominated
2009 Scream Awards	Best Ensemble		Nominated
2009 Scream Awards	Best F/X		Nominated
2009 Scream Awards	Scream Song of the Year	"Desolation Row" by My Chemical Romance	Nominated
2009 Scream Awards	Best Superhero	Jackie Earle Haley	Nominated
2009 Scream Awards	Best Superhero	Billy Crudup	Nominated
2009 Scream Awards	Best Superhero	Malin Åkerman	Nominated
2009 Scream Awards	Most Memorable Mutilation	Arms Cut off by Rotary Saw	Nominated
2009 Scream Awards	Fight Scene of the Year	Ozymandias v. The Comedian	Nominated
2009 Scream Awards	Holy Sh!t! Scene of the Year	The Destruction of Manhattan	Nominated
2009 Scream Awards	Best Comic Book Movie		Won
2009 VES Awards	Outstanding Animated Character in a Live Action Feature Motion Picture	Doctor Manhattan	Nominated

== See also ==
- Watchmen, an HBO limited series set after the events of the graphic novel.
- Watchmen (2024), a two-part animated film adaptation of the graphic novel.
- List of films set on Mars

== Bibliography ==
- Aperlo, Peter (February 2009). Watchmen: The Film Companion. Titan Books. p. 176. ISBN 978-1-84856-159-5.
