= Siberia (2018 film) =

2018 Canadian-American film by Matthew Ross

- Theatrical release poster
- Directed by: Matthew Ross
- Written by: Scott B. Smith
- Story by: Stephen Hamel
- Produced by: Stephen Hamel; Braden Aftergood; Gabriela Bacher; Dave Hansen
- Starring: Keanu Reeves; Ana Ularu; Pasha D. Lychnikoff; Veronica Ferres; Molly Ringwald
- Cinematography: Eric Koretz
- Edited by: Louise Ford
- Music by: Daniel Bensi; Saunder Jurriaans
- Production companies: Elevated Films; The Fyzz Facility; Ingenious Media; Global Road Entertainment; Summerstorm Entertainment; Film House Germany; Company Films
- Distributed by: Saban Films
- Release date: July 13, 2018 (United States)
- Running time: 104 minutes
- Countries: United States; Canada
- Languages: English; Russian
- Box office: $636,366

Siberia is a 2018 thriller film directed by Matthew Ross and written by Scott B. Smith from a story by Stephen Hamel. It stars Keanu Reeves, Ana Ularu, Pasha D. Lychnikoff and Molly Ringwald.

== Plot ==
American diamond merchant Lucas Hill travels to Russia to sell rare blue diamonds to gangster Boris Volkov. However, his contact in St. Petersburg, Pyotr who had the diamonds, has gone missing. Boris threatens Lucas to deliver the diamonds in 48 hours.

Following Pyotr's clues, Lucas arrives at a guest house in Mirny, Siberia, a rough mining town. He briefly contacts his wife Gabby through Skype. He goes to a cafe and starts a fight with two drunks who are harassing a cafe owner named Katya, who saves him after they jump him in the parking lot. Later, her brother Ivan suspects her of sleeping with Lucas, so she defiantly asks him to sleep with her.

Lucas meets Pyotr's brother Andrei who tells him that Pyotr sold counterfeit diamonds to a man named Samsonov and hid the real ones. Enraged, Lucas goes back to Katya's home. They start a passionate affair and Lucas lets Katya know that his relationship with his wife is more of a habit than a love story. Lucas goes bear hunting with Ivan and Katya's other brothers, who mock-threaten him. Lucas earns Ivan's respect when Lucas puts Ivan's dog out of its misery after the dog is accidentally shot by Ivan’s brother.

Lucas returns to Pyotr's apartment in St. Petersburg to search again for the diamonds, and finds one hidden in a candle that is real. Remembering a similar candle in the Mirny guest house, he asks Katya to bring it to him, finding another diamond inside, which is a fake. Lucas meets Boris to show him the real diamond and promise to return with the rest later. He is unknowingly followed by Katya, who arrives after the meeting has started. To solidify their deal, Boris demands a ritual of brotherhood where Boris’s woman services Lucas and Lucas' woman (Katya) services Boris. Lucas vainly attempts to talk his way out of the situation, but when Boris convinces Katya that refusal of such an offer is deadly, she tells Lucas to agree.

Returning to his hotel, Lucas is met by the FSB agents who arrested Samsonov. They pressure Lucas to sell the fake diamonds to Boris, which Pyotr had sold to Samsonov, and get the money to the agents. In return, they promise him safe passage home. Lucas and the FSB know that once Boris finds out, he will kill his wife and Katya and Lucas won't be able to hide for long. Lucas manages to convince Boris to buy the diamonds and wire the money to the agents' account, but gets a warning from Boris' henchman Pavel of the consequences if he betrays him.

Pyotr's brother Andrei tells Lucas where to find Pyotr, who is hiding in an old farm in Siberia. With help from Katya's brother, Ivan, and with Katya tagging along, Lucas goes there and he and Ivan find Pyotr murdered, leaving no way to retrieve the real diamonds. Lucas tells Ivan to let Katya know that his love for her is real when everything is finished. Lucas promises to meet Katya the next morning, while Ivan lends him his hunting rifle, knowing that there is no other way this could end but violently with Boris's henchmen. Katya and Ivan leave and Lucas burns down the shack where Pyotr's body was found.

Pavel and a few henchmen find Lucas at the farmhouse. Lucas manages to kill some of the henchmen while trying to escape, but he is shot in the back by Pavel and dies.

== Cast ==
- Keanu Reeves as Lucas Hill
- Ana Ularu as Katya
- Pasha D. Lychnikoff as Boris Volkov
- Veronica Ferres as Raisa
- Molly Ringwald as Gabby Hill
- Dmitry Chepovetsky as Ivan
- James Gracie as Vincent
- Eugene Lipinski as Polozin
- Rafael Petardi as Pavel
- Aleks Paunovic as Yefrem
- Boris Gulyarin as Pyotr
- Vlad Stokanic as Andrei
- Ashley St. George as Christa
- Vitaliy Demens as Lio
- Cory Chetyrbok As Anton

== Production ==
In February 2017, it was announced Keanu Reeves had been cast in the film, with Matthew Ross directing from a screenplay by Scott B. Smith. Stephen Hamel, Reeves, and Gabriela Bacher will produce the film under their Company Films, Summerstorm Productions banners respectively. In April 2017, Aleks Paunovic, Pasha D. Lychnikoff, Ana Ularu, and Molly Ringwald joined the cast of the film.

Production began in May 2017. Some scenes have been filmed in Saint Petersburg; Siberian scenes have also been filmed in Manitoba, Canada, including the small towns of Cooks Creek and Marquette.

== Release ==
In May 2018, Saban Films acquired distribution rights to the film. It had a limited domestic release in theaters on July 13, 2018, worldwide on July 20, 2018, and on VOD by Lionsgate Home Entertainment on September 18, 2018.

== Reception ==
On Metacritic, the film has a weighted average score of 34 out of 100, based on 15 critics, indicating "generally unfavorable reviews".
