= Baller's Lady =

Studio album by Passion
- Released: August 27, 1996
- Recorded: 1995–1996
- Genre: Hip hop
- Length: 53:46
- Label: MCA
- Producer: Kirv (also exec.); Mark C. Henry; Studio Ton

Professional ratings
Review scores
Source	Rating
AllMusic	4/5 stars
MusicHound R&B: The Essential Album Guide	2/5 stars

Baller's Lady is the debut studio album by the American rapper Passion. It was released on August 27, 1996, through MCA Records. Production was handled by Kirv, Mark C. Henry and Studio Ton. The album features guest appearances from B-Legit, E-40, Rappin' 4-Tay and Too $hort. The album was a commercial failure and only made it to #85 on the Top R&B/Hip-Hop Albums, causing MCA to drop her from the label.

== Where I'm From ==
Passion's debut single "Where I'm From" was released in early 1996 and became a minor hit on the Billboard Hot Rap Songs charts. The song samples the 1988 Too Short and Rappin' 4-Tay song, "Don't Fight the Feelin'", which originally sampled the 1982 One Way song of the same name.

"Where I'm From" was produced by Studio Ton and written by Passion Broussard, Kevin Irving, and Valerie Webb.

The album's final track, "Don't Fight the Remix" is a remixed version of the song and features performances from Rappin' 4-Tay, Too Short and Soul Depot. This remix is a bonus track exclusive to the CD release.

A clean version of the remix, titled the "Don't Fight the Clean Mix II", appeared in the 1996 film Bulletproof and was released as a single and a music video to promote the film's soundtrack.

The song "Baller's Lady" featuring E-40, was originally heard in the 1996 film The Great White Hype and was also included on the film's soundtrack.

== Track listing ==
1. "Keep It Real" - 3:25
2. "Where I'm From" - 3:26
3. "Gigolos Get Lonely Too" - 5:25
4. "Baller's Lady" - 3:46 (featuring E-40)
5. "Fonky Ride" - 4:54 (featuring B-Legit)
6. "Who's the Mack?" - 1:20
7. "Feel Me" - 4:47
8. "B.I.T.C.H." - 1:36
9. "Gotta Be da Bomb" - 3:23 (featuring D.A.P.)
10. "Sho Luv Them Gangstas "- 4:12
11. "Playa Hatas" - 3:48 (featuring Tee)
12. "Can't Be #1" - 3:33
13. "Natural High" - 4:29 (featuring D.A.P.)
14. "Bump Fo Ya Trunk "- 1:30
15. "Don't Fight the Remix" - 4:12 (featuring Too $hort, Rappin' 4-Tay & Soul Depot)

== Chart history ==
Chart (1996)	Peak position
US Top R&B/Hip-Hop Albums (Billboard)	85
