= R and J =

2021 American drama film based on Shakespeare's Romeo and Juliet

R#J
- Directed by: Carey Williams
- Screenplay by: Rickie Castaneda; Oleksii Sobolev; Carey Williams
- Based on: Romeo and Juliet by William Shakespeare
- Produced by: Timur Bekmambetov; Oleksii Sobolev; Igor Tsay
- Starring: David Zayas; María Gabriela de Faría; Diego Tinoco; RJ Cyler
- Cinematography: Diego Madrigal
- Edited by: Lam Nguyen
- Music by: Rene G. Boscio
- Production company: Interface Films
- Release date: January 30, 2021 (Sundance)
- Running time: 91 min.
- Country: United States
- Language: English

R#J is a 2021 American experimental romantic drama film written by Rickie Castaneda, Oleksii Sobolev and Carey Williams, who is also the director. The film stars David Zayas, María Gabriela de Faría, Diego Tinoco and RJ Cyler. The film is a modern-day adaptation of Shakespeare's romantic tragedy Romeo and Juliet, told through text messages, photos and videos on mobile phones and social media posts.

The film had its world premiere at the 2021 Sundance Film Festival on January 30, 2021.

== Cast ==
- David Zayas as Fernando
- María Gabriela de Faría as Nancy
- Diego Tinoco as Tybalt
- RJ Cyler as Benvo
- Moe Irvin as Alcide Montague
- Jacob Ming-Trent as Friar Lawrence
- Emilio Garcia-Sanchez as Sampson
- Camaron Engels as Romeo
- Siddiq Saunderson as Mercutio
- Ricky Russert as Gregory
- Francesca Noel as Juliet
- DeShawn Cavanaugh as Abram
- Matias Ponce as Young Fernando

== Release ==
The film had its premiere in the 2021 Sundance Film Festival on January 30, 2021 in the Next section. It also screened at South by Southwest in March 2021, where it won the Adobe Editing Award.

== Reception ==
R#J received mixed reviews from critics. On the review aggregator website Rotten Tomatoes, 52% of 27 critics' reviews are positive, with an average rating of 6.4/10. The website's consensus reads: "R#J represents an admirable attempt to update Romeo and Juliet, but alas, its bounty is not quite as boundless as the sea."
