= Marcus Callender =

American actor

- Born: March 6, 1990 (age 36)
- Occupation: Actor
- Years active: 2013–present

Marcus Callender is an American actor. He is best known for playing Oliver 'Power' Grant in the series Wu-Tang: An American Saga.

== Early life ==
Callender is from Brooklyn, New York City. He originally wanted to become a pro athlete and played basketball and baseball in high school. He became interested in acting in the 11th grade thanks to his English teacher Miss Bauman. She had him read plays such as The Crucible and had him perform in front of his classmates. She recognised his talents and advised him to start acting. He played the lead role in his school play A Raisin in the Sun.

== Career ==
Callender made his on-screen debut in the crime series Blue Bloods. He also made a one off appearance in the comedy drama series Elementary His first major role came playing Detective Yeager in the thriller series Eye Candy starring Victoria Justice. He was rumoured to have landed the role of Dr Dre in the biographical drama Straight Outta Compton but he eventually missed out on the role. He was cast to play one of the lead roles in an ABC drama show called Model Woman but it never materialised. His biggest role so far has been playing Oliver 'Power' Grant in the drama series Wu-Tang: An American Saga. He has made a one off appearance as Malcolm King in the crime drama series The Equalizer and has portrayed Ray Ray in both Power and its spinoff series Power Book II: Ghost.

== Filmography ==
=== Film ===
Year	Title	Role	Notes
2014	Listen Up Philip	Jock Guy	
2014	Dinner at 40	Duane	Short
2015	Anesthesia	Medical Assistant	
2015	Straight Outta Compton	HBO Rapper	
2016	The Breaks	Scooby	
2020	Sudden Darkness	Jerome Moore	Short

=== Television ===
Year	Title	Role	Notes
2013	Blue Bloods	EMT Bike Path	Episode; Fathers and Sons
2013	Elementary	Young Cop	Episode; On the Line
2013	Headshots & Breakdowns	Shane	2 episodes
2015	Eye Candy	Detective Yeager	10 episodes
2015	The Affair	Reggie	Episode; #2.10
2016	Shades of Blue	Miles	3 episodes
2016	Model Woman	Drew Pickett	Episode; Pilot
2016	The Night Of		Episode; The Beach
2017	The Breaks	Scooby	8 episodes
2016-2017	Power	Ray Ray	5 episodes
2017	Blindspot	Agent Berger	Episode; City Folks Under Wraps
2019	New Amsterdam	Kenny	Episode; The Denominator
2020	Evil	Harlan Zephyrs	Episode; Room 320
2021	The Equalizer	Malcolm King	Episode; It Takes a Village
2022	Power Book II: Ghost	Ray Ray	Episode; A Fair Fight
2019-2023	Wu-Tang: An American Saga	Oliver Grant	30 episodes
