= Wu-Tang: An American Saga =

American biographical drama television series

- Season 3 release poster
- Genre: Biographical drama
- Created by: The RZA; Alex Tse
- Starring: Ashton Sanders; Shameik Moore; Siddiq Saunderson; Julian Elijah Martinez; Marcus Callender; Erika Alexander; Zolee Griggs; David "Dave East" Brewster; TJ Atoms; Johnell Xavier Young; Joey Bada$$
- Composer: The RZA
- Country of origin: United States
- Original language: English
- No. of seasons: 3
- No. of episodes: 30

Production
- Executive producers: Mario Van Peebles; Gail Barringer; Michael C. Martin; Zak Schwartz; Brian Grazer; Francie Calfo; Alex Tse; The RZA; Method Man
- Producers: James Seidman; Earl Davis; Ryan O'Nan; Gabe Fonseca
- Cinematography: Gavin Kelly; Niels Alpert
- Editors: Josh Beal; Debby Germino; Jake Pushinsky; Bjørn T. Myrholt
- Running time: 42–59 minutes
- Production companies: RZA Productions; Minute Drill Productions; Imagine Television; 20th Television (Note: Beginning with season 2; not involved with season 1. Also took over as copyright holder from Imagine Television starting with season 2.)

Original release
- Network: Hulu
- Release: September 4, 2019 – April 5, 2023

Wu-Tang: An American Saga is an American biographical drama television series created by RZA and Alex Tse which premiered on September 4, 2019, on Hulu. The show portrays a fictionalized account of the formation of the Wu-Tang Clan. In January 2020, the series was renewed for a second season which premiered on September 8, 2021. In November 2021, the series was renewed for a third and final season which premiered on February 15, 2023. Set in New York City during the crack epidemic in the United States in the early 1990s, it follows Bobby Diggs as he unites a dozen young men who are torn between music and crime. The series stars Ashton Sanders as Bobby Diggs, alongside Shameik Moore, Siddiq Saunderson, Julian Elijah Martinez, Marcus Callender, and Erika Alexander.

== Premise ==
Wu-Tang: An American Saga is set in New York City during the crack epidemic in the United States in the early 1990s. It follows the Wu-Tang Clan's formation, a vision of Bobby Diggs aka The RZA (Sanders), and its rise amid the dangers and excesses that came with the epidemic. Seeking his own way out, Diggs turns to rap in order to carve a path to fame going against his older brother Divine (Martinez), who favored the drug trade as the means to giving their family a better life. The story depicts how it all came together for the clan as Diggs unites a dozen young men who are torn between music and crime. The group battles against the forces that hold them down and these include their own occasional impulse to give up the fight.

== Cast ==
=== Main ===
- Ashton Sanders as Bobby "RZA" Diggs
- Shameik Moore as Corey "Raekwon" Woods
- Siddiq Saunderson as Dennis "Ghostface Killah" Coles
- Julian Elijah Martinez as Mitchell "Divine" Diggs
- Marcus Callender as Oliver "Power" Grant
- Erika Alexander as Linda Diggs
- Zolee Griggs as Shurrie Diggs
- David "Dave East" Brewster as Clifford "Method Man" Smith
- TJ Atoms as Russell "Ol' Dirty Bastard" Jones
- Johnell Xavier Young as Gary "GZA" Grice
- Joey Bada$$ (season 1) / Uyoata Udi (seasons 2-3) as Jason "Inspectah Deck" Hunter
- Damani Sease as Lamont "U-God" Hawkins
- JaQwan J. Kelly as Jamel "Masta Killa" Irief

=== Recurring ===
- Malcolm Xavier as "Haze", based on Ernest "Kase" Sayon. (season 1)
- Moise Morancy as Treach
- Caleb Castille as Darryl "Cappadonna" Hill
- Trayce Malachi as young Bobby Diggs
- Jaidon Walls as young Divine Diggs
- Vincent Pastore as Fat Larry
- Anthony Chisholm as Old Chess Player
- Jorge Lendeborg Jr. as Jah Son (season 1)
- Ebony Obsidian as Nia
- Stephen McKinley Henderson as Uncle Hollis
- Natalie Carter as Miss Gloria
- Robert Crayton as Attila (season 1)
- Bokeem Woodbine as Jerome
- Jamie Hector as Andre D Andre (season 1)
- Jason C. Louder as Cressy (Season 1)
- Justus Davis-Graham as Randy Diggs
- Gbenga Akinnagbe as John "Mook" Gibbons
- Samuel McKoy-Johnson as Darius Coles
- Amyrh Harris as Darren Coles
- Jake Hoffman as Steve Rifkind
- Martin Fisher as Head Janitor
- La La Anthony as Tracy Waples (season 2)

=== Guest ===
- Christian Combs as Sean "Puff Daddy" Combs
- Wavyy Jones as Christopher "Biggie Smalls" Wallace / The Notorious B.I.G.
- Kelsey Caesar as Nasir "Nas" Jones
- Louis Gomez as Joseph "Fat Joe" Cartagena
- Joshua Grant as Lamont "Big L" Coleman
- Saeed Muhammad as Trevor "Busta Rhymes" Smith Jr.
- Keith Johnson as Erick Sermon
- Sedly Bloomfield as Major Harris
- James Adam Tucker as Wilbert Hart
- Nate Bynum as William Hart
- Xolo Maridueña as King Tech
- Ryan O'Nan as Tommy Mottola

== Episodes ==
Season	Episodes	Originally released	
Season	Episodes	First released	Last released
1	10	September 4, 2019	October 23, 2019
2	10	September 8, 2021	October 27, 2021
3	10	February 15, 2023	April 5, 2023

=== Season 1 (2019) ===
No. overall	No. in season	Title	Directed by	Written by	Original release date
1	1	"Can It Be All So Simple"	Chris Robinson	The RZA & Alex Tse	September 4, 2019
Staten Island, New York. Red Top. Blue Top. The birth of Wu-Tang starts with a bang. After a drive-by on Dennis Coles, he seeks revenge. His close friend, Bobby Diggs, has his eyes set on an SP-1200 drum machine.
2	2	"Winter Warz"	Norberto Barba	The RZA & Alex Tse	September 4, 2019
With Divine navigating politics in prison, Dennis and Bobby step up to handle his distribution responsibilities. They scrounge up enough cash to buy a kilo of crack-cocaine from one of Divine's associates, Haze.
3	3	"All In Together Now"	Darren Grant	The RZA & Alex Tse	September 4, 2019
The death of a friend shakes Staten Island to its core. While Dennis mourns, Bobby, Gary, and Ason reminisce. Prison becomes more complicated for Divine. Haze and Cressy plan to reunite Staten Island by hosting a rap battle.
4	4	"All That I Got Is You"	Tara Nicole Weyr	Rodney Barnes	September 11, 2019
Bobby and Dennis find a new hustle to make some cream - taking a slice of Wall Street for themselves. Later, they make music with Shotgun and Ason, drawing influence from witty and unpredictable sources.
5	5	"Cold World"	Jet Wilkinson	Ryan O'Nan	September 18, 2019
Divine returns home from prison but nothing feels the same - especially with Bobby in "charge" of the house. When Bobby cuts a track with a Shotgun, the rift between Park Hill and Stapleton grows. Infuriated, Dennis drops a track of his own.
6	6	"Impossible"	Craig Zisk	Zina Camblin	September 25, 2019
With debts to pay, Bobby continues his pick-ups – meeting up with friend and fellow rapper, Rebel. But short on cash and desperate, Bobby and Dennis try a new angle only to find themselves in a worse situation.
7	7	"Box in Hand"	Malcolm D. Lee	Chelsey Lora	October 2, 2019
Shotgun's troubled past is illuminated. With the rest of the Diggs' family moving out, Bobby and Divine must continue to hold it down. Before leaving, Jerome passes along some heartfelt advice to Divine.
8	8	"Labels"	Tara Nicole Weyr	Gabe Fonseca	October 9, 2019
Bobby embarks on his first tour with Gary and Ason and learns some harsh truths of the music business. Music might be the road to freedom but it's paved with plenty of set-backs. Industry Rule #4,080...
9	9	"I Declare War"	Craig Zisk	Zak Schwartz	October 16, 2019
With Attila's release from prison looming over Bobby, he must act. Dennis reevaluates his ways, drawing inspiration from ancient teachings. Shurrie realizes that there are parts of Staten Island she can't leave behind.
10	10	"Assassination Day"	Colin Bucksey	Emily Shesh	October 23, 2019
As a mysterious tape makes the rounds of NYC, Bobby and Dennis try to figure out how to handle Attila. Sha's savvy pays off and Shurrie evaluates her options. The seeds of Wu Tang begin to sprout.

=== Season 2 (2021) ===
No. overall	No. in season	Title	Directed by	Written by	Original release date
11	1	"Little Ghetto Boys"	Mario Van Peebles	The RZA & Alex Tse	September 8, 2021
Bobby and Dennis have joined the Diggs family in Ohio, with Bobby seemingly having abandoned his ambitions around music and Dennis and Shurrie expecting their first child. However, things heat up when Bobby is cornered by his girlfriend's ex. Bobby defends himself and is urged by his mother to turn himself in and tell his truth. RZA then leaves the group
12	2	"Brooklyn Zoo"	Craig Zisk	Emily Shesh	September 8, 2021
Bobby goes all in on music while the rest of the Clan struggles with life in the projects.
13	3	"Hollow Bones"	Matthew Ross	Ryan O'Nan	September 8, 2021
The Clan becomes disillusioned with their paths as Bobby prepares to steer them in a new direction.
14	4	"Pioneer the Frontier"	Craig Zisk	Zina Camblin	September 15, 2021
Bobby assembles Dennis, Divine, Sha, and Power on the Staten Island ferry, asking them to squash their beef and come together as Wu-Tang Clan.
15	5	"Visionz"	Dinh Thai	Zak Schwartz	September 22, 2021
The group works together to build out their recording studio, while simultaneously finding their harmony as collaborators. Divine utilizes his business acumen to guide Wu-Tang's branding and entity formation. Dennis prepares for Shurrie and Infinite to arrive in New York.
16	6	"Protect Ya Neck"	Mario Van Peebles	Lakshmi Sundaram	September 29, 2021
The Clan digs deep to make the perfect record to take the industry by storm.
17	7	"Airwaves"	Nijla Mu'min	Gabe Fonseca	October 6, 2021
With Protect Ya Neck in hand, the Clan hustles to get it on airwaves and in stores by any means necessary.
18	8	"Saturday Nite"	Rachel Raimist	Earl Davis	October 13, 2021
The pressure is on when the Clan tells label executives to come see them perform at a legendary hip hop club on a night they aren't booked.
19	9	"C.R.E.A.M"	Dinh Thai	Solange Morales	October 20, 2021
RZA is torn between long money and quick cash as the Clan struggles with financial issues.
20	10	"As High as Wu-Tang Gets"	Mario Van Peebles	Michael C. Martin	October 27, 2021
The Clan makes big moves for Wu domination.

=== Season 3 (2023) ===
No. overall	No. in season	Title	Directed by	Written by	Original release date
21	1	"I Can't Go to Sleep"	Mario Van Peebles	Alex Tse	February 15, 2023
Following six months in the wake of the season two finale, we find RZA and the Wu-Tang Clan have moved out of Staten Island to a mansion in the woods of New Jersey. Despite the massive success of their recently released album, they've only just begun.
22	2	"All I Need"	Nefertite Nguvu	Emily Shesh	February 15, 2023
As an album deadline nears, RZA must reconcile with his cousin Dirty by any means necessary. Dirty, however, takes refuge at Shurrie's apartment. The friendship between Ghostface and Raekwon strengthens as they discuss a potential collaboration.
23	3	"Dirty Dancin'"	Mario Van Peebles	Michael C. Martin	February 15, 2023
In our first allegorical movie of the season, we see Dirty take on the persona of "Dirt McGirt" in the theme of a 1970s blaxploitation film, as he finds inspiration for his first solo album, Return to the 36 Chambers.
24	4	"Daytona 500"	Matthew Ross	Zak Schwartz	February 22, 2023
The Wu-Tang Clan goes on a tour of the East Coast as we follow what happens between the shows on the tour bus. The guys quickly discover that living on a bus together might not be all fun, as they're forced to deal with their problems face-to-face.
25	5	"A Better Tomorrow"	Nefertite Nguvu	Zina Camblin	March 1, 2023
Following the completion of the tour, we see the paths of a few lesser known Wu-Tang members as they search for their individual voices amongst the crowd.
26	6	"Criminology"	Matthew Ross	Gabe Fonseca	March 8, 2023
In our second allegorical movie of the season, we examine Raekwon's inspiration behind his first solo album, Only Built 4 Cuban Linx... through the lens of 90s gangster cinema.
27	7	"Shadowboxin'"	Janice Cooke	Isabella Escalante	March 15, 2023
In order to secure a deal for their new label, Divine must deliver on the promises he made to music executive Tommy Mottola. But upon returning to the Wu mansion, he learns that signing members and getting Dirty to feature on a song is easier said than done.
28	8	"Liquid Swords"	The RZA	The RZA	March 22, 2023
For the third allegorical movie of the season, we follow GZA, who takes on the persona of "The Genius" as he journeys through an alternate reality New York City to unite the people using the music from his debut solo album, Liquid Swords.
29	9	"After the Smoke Is Clear"	Eif Rivera	Gabe Fonseca & Zak Schwartz	March 29, 2023
In the penultimate episode of the series, Ghostface reflects on the sacrifices of his past while dealing with the bittersweet outcome of his artistic success. Meanwhile, RZA ventures to take a different approach for the Clan's next album.
30	10	"Triumph"	The RZA	Alex Tse	April 5, 2023
RZA pushes his musicianship to new heights as he creates Wu-Tang Forever with a studio orchestra, but the recording process strains the Clan. As tensions boil over during their biggest tour yet, RZA is concerned about Wu-Tang's future and legacy.

== Production ==
=== Development ===
On October 11, 2018, it was announced that Hulu had given the production a series order consisting of ten episodes. The series was created by RZA and Alex Tse, both of whom were expected to write for the series and executive produce alongside Brian Grazer, Merrin Dungey, and Method Man. Consulting producers were set to consist of Ghostface Killah, Inspectah Deck, Masta Killa, and GZA as well as the estate of Ol' Dirty Bastard. Production companies were slated to include Imagine Television. On January 17, 2020, the series was renewed for a second season which premiered on September 8, 2021, with a three-episode release. On November 4, 2021, Hulu renewed the series for a third and final season. On December 14, 2022, it was announced that the third and final season will premiere on February 15, 2023.

=== Filming ===
Principal photography for the series commenced in February 2019 in New York City, New York. Filming took place on locations in East Orange, Elmwood Park, Kearny at Kearny Point, Newark, Paterson, Plainfield, and Secaucus in New Jersey.

== Release ==
Wu Tang: An American Saga was released internationally on Disney+ via the Star hub in selected territories.

== Reception ==
=== Audience viewership ===
According to Parrot Analytics, which looks at consumer engagement in consumer research, streaming, downloads, and on social media, Wu-Tang: An American Saga was the 10th most in-demand United States streaming series, during the week of September 11, 2021 to September 17, 2021.

=== Critical response ===
On Rotten Tomatoes, the first season holds an approval rating of 74% based on 19 reviews, with an average rating of 7.10/10. The site's critical consensus reads: "While not quite as impressive as its legendary subject matter, An American Saga is a beautifully rendered and raw exploration of the Wu-Tang journey." On Metacritic, it has a weighted average score of 58 out of 100 based on reviews from 4 critics, indicating "mixed or average reviews".

=== Accolades ===
Year	Award	Category	Nominee(s)	Result	Ref.
2020	Primetime Emmy Awards	Outstanding Original Main Title Theme Music	RZA	Nominated	
2020	Golden Reel Awards	Outstanding Achievement in Sound Editing – Episodic Short Form – Music	Shie Rozow	Won	
2020	Online Film & Television Association	Best New Theme Song in a Series	Wu-Tang: An American Saga	Nominated	
2020	Black Reel Awards	Outstanding Supporting Actor, Drama Series	Ashton Sanders	Nominated	
2020	Black Reel Awards	Outstanding Drama Series	Wu-Tang: An American Saga	Nominated	
2022	Golden Reel Awards	Outstanding Achievement in Sound Editing – Series 1 Hour – Music	Sebastian Zuleta	Won	
2022	Golden Trailer Awards	Best Music for a TV/Streaming Series	Wu-Tang: An American Saga	Won	
