= 4 tha Hard Way =

4 Tha Hard Way

Studio album by Rappin' 4-Tay
- Released: October 21, 1997
- Genre: West Coast hip hop; gangsta rap; G-funk
- Label: Noo Trybe Records
- Producer: Al Eaton; Alonzo Jackson; Ant Banks; C-Funk; Daniel LeMelle; G-Man Stan; K Lou; Les G; Mike City; Premiere Music; Rick James; Studio Ton

Rappin' 4-Tay chronology
Off Parole (1996)	4 Tha Hard Way (1997)	Bigga Than Da Game (1998)

Professional ratings
Review scores
Source	Rating
AllMusic	3/5 stars
The Source	3/5 stars

4 Tha Hard Way is the fourth album by the West Coast hip hop artist Rappin' 4-Tay, released by Noo Trybe Records in 1997. Featuring production from Bay Area producer Ant Banks, as well as guest appearances from the likes of Rick James, E-40 and Master P, the entire album is dedicated to the memory of Tupac Shakur. The album debuted on the Billboard 200 chart at number 169, with 7,000 copies sold in the first week. Upon the album's release, Rappin' 4-Tay considered 4 Tha Hard Way his best album despite its surprisingly low sales, with his manager blaming the label for changing the release date and not promoting the album.

Alex Henderson of AllMusic noted the album's "positive and congenial tone" and tendency towards "melodic, R&B-flavored tracks", concluding that it was "decent, but not remarkable". Miguel Burke of The Source thought that the best moments on the albums are the songs performed solo by Rappin' 4-Tay, where he "stray[s] away from the redundant topic of being a player", but criticized the album for its lack of a hit song, resulting in an album that fails to reach the level of the classic West Coast hip hop albums.

== Track listing ==
No.	Title	Length
1.	"Playaz Dedication"	4:49
2.	"One Nite"	4:03
3.	"Beats for Sale" (skit)	0:44
4.	"What's Wrong Wit' the Game" (featuring E-40)	4:15
5.	"Money Makes the Man" (featuring J. Mess & Sauce)	3:53
6.	"Where You Playin' At"	4:31
7.	"Cold Blooded" (featuring Rick James)	4:10
8.	"Just Came Up" (skit)	0:17
9.	"Back At Cha"	3:57
10.	"Playa 4 Life" (featuring Master P)	4:14
11.	"What Fo'"	5:25
12.	"Ain't Nobody Coachin'" (featuring Frankie J)	3:46
13.	"Brin' the Beat Back" (featuring Lil' Fly)	3:31
14.	"Lay Ya Gunz Down"	4:54
15.	"The Biggie (skit)"	0:27
16.	"The Biggie" (featuring Screwface)	4:06
17.	"Shake It" (featuring The Conscious Daughters)	4:26
18.	"The Element Of Surprise" (featuring San Quinn & Messy Marv)	4:21
19.	"Thinkin' About You" (featuring Carl "C.D." Douglas)	4:06
20.	"4-Tha Hard Way"	3:33
