= Faces in the Crowd (2011 film) =

- Promotional image
- Directed by: Julien Magnat
- Written by: Julien Magnat; Kelly Smith; Agnès Caffin
- Produced by: Kevin DeWalt; Jean-Charles Levy; Clément Miserez
- Starring: Milla Jovovich; Julian McMahon; David Atrakchi; Sarah Wayne Callies; Sandrine Holt
- Cinematography: Rene Ohashi
- Edited by: Antoine Vareille
- Music by: John McCarthy
- Production companies: Minds Eye Entertainment; Radar Films; Frantic Films; Forecast Pictures; Voltage Pictures
- Distributed by: Millennium Entertainment
- Release date: November 4, 2011
- Running time: 102 minutes
- Countries: United States; Canada; United Kingdom
- Language: English
- Budget: $15 million
- Box office: $2 million

Faces in the Crowd is a 2011 crime thriller film written and directed by Julien Magnat, starring Milla Jovovich, Julian McMahon, David Atrakchi, Michael Shanks, Sandrine Holt, and Sarah Wayne Callies.

== Premise ==
Anna Marchant (Milla Jovovich) witnesses a murder by a serial killer called Tearjerker Jack (David Atrakchi). Jack chases and attacks her, but she eludes him by falling from a bridge. Anna wakes from a coma one week later and is diagnosed with prosopagnosia, also known as "face blindness". Able to recognize objects but not faces, she works with police detective Sam Kerrest (Julian McMahon) to stop Tearjerker Jack before he can murder her.

== Cast ==
- Milla Jovovich as Anna Merchant
- Julian McMahon as Detective Samuel "Sam" Kerrest
- David Atrakchi as Detective Eric Lanyon / Tearjerker Jack
- Michael Shanks as Bryce, Anna's boyfriend
- Sarah Wayne Callies as Francine, Anna's bestfriend
- Sandrine Holt as Nina #6
- Marianne Faithfull as Dr. H Langenkamp
- Valentina Vargas as Nina, Anna's bestfriend
- Anthony Lemke as Bryce #3
- Nels Lennarson as Detective Kerrest #1
- Chris Kalhoon as Kerrest #2
- David Ingram as Bryce #2
- Medina Hahn as Nina #4

== Production ==
This movie is the second feature of writer/director Julien Magnat. Production began May 8, 2010 in and around Winnipeg, Manitoba, Canada, and principal photography wrapped up on June 13, 2010.

== Reception ==
On the review aggregator website Rotten Tomatoes, 0% of 5 critics' reviews are positive, with an average rating of 3.2/10.

== See also ==
- Prasanna Vadanam
