= Passion (rapper) =

American former rapper

- Also known as: Passion Broussard
- Born: Oakland, California
- Genres: Hip hop; R&B
- Occupations: Singer; rapper; songwriter; dancer; record producer
- Years active: 1995–2003
- Labels: MCA Records; Yo Playa Patna Records

Passion is an American former rapper. In 1996, she signed a deal with MCA Records and released her first single "Where I'm From", which peaked at 29 on the Hot Rap Singles. Her first album, Baller's Lady, was released on August 27, 1996, and entered the Top R&B/Hip-Hop Albums chart, peaking at 85. Passion made a cameo appearance in the 1996 E-40 music video for "Rapper's Ball". She continued to perform until 1998, with her last major appearance being on No Limit Records' compilation Mean Green.

== Discography ==
=== Studio albums ===
| Title | Release | Peak chart positions |
| Title | Release | US R&B |
|---|---|---|
| Baller's Lady | Released: August 27, 1996; Label: MCA | 85 |
| Blame It on the Game | Released: March 23, 1999; Label: Yo Playa Patna | — |

=== Singles ===
| Title | Release | Peak chart positions | | | Album |
| Title | Release | US Hot | US R&B | US Rap | Album |
|---|---|---|---|---|---|
| "Where I'm From" | 1996 | — | 88 | 29 | Baller's Lady |

== Soundtrack appearances ==
| Title | Release | Other artist(s) | Soundtrack album |
|---|---|---|---|
| "Baller's Lady" | 1996 | E-40 | The Great White Hype |
| "Where I'm From (Don't Fight the Clean Mix II)" | 1996 | Rappin' 4-Tay, Too Short, Soul Depot | Bulletproof |

=== Guest appearances ===
| Title | Release | Other artist(s) | Album |
|---|---|---|---|
| "Ain't No Playa (Playaz Shit)" | 1996 | Rappin' 4-Tay | Off Parole |
| "Don't Be Mad" | 1998 | | Major Players |

== Videography ==
=== Music videos ===
| Title | Release | Other artist(s) | Album |
|---|---|---|---|
| "Where I'm From" | 1996 | | Baller's Lady |
| "Where I'm From (Don't Fight the Clean Mix II)" | 1996 | Rappin' 4-Tay, Too Short, Soul Depot | Bulletproof |
