= Frank & Lola =

- Theatrical release poster
- Directed by: Matthew Ross
- Written by: Matthew Ross
- Produced by: Jay Van Hoy; John Baker; Christopher Ramirez; Lars Knudsen
- Starring: Michael Shannon; Imogen Poots; Michael Nyqvist; Justin Long; Stella Schnabel; Rosanna Arquette; Emmanuelle Devos
- Cinematography: Eric Koretz
- Edited by: Jennifer Lilly; Rebecca Rodriguez
- Music by: Daniel Bensi; Saunder Jurriaans
- Production companies: Parts and Labor; Killer Films; Lola Pictures; FullDawa Films; Great Point Media
- Distributed by: Universal Pictures; Paladin
- Release dates: January 27, 2016 (Sundance Film Festival); December 9, 2016 (United States)
- Running time: 88 minutes
- Country: United States
- Language: English
- Box office: $9,188

Frank & Lola is a 2016 American neo-noir erotic thriller film written and directed by Matthew Ross in his directorial debut, and starring Michael Shannon, Imogen Poots, Michael Nyqvist, Justin Long, Emmanuelle Devos and Rosanna Arquette.

The film had its world premiere at the 2016 Sundance Film Festival on January 27, 2016. It was released theatrically and through video on demand on December 9, 2016, by Universal Pictures and Paladin.

== Plot ==
Frank, a chef in Las Vegas, meets and falls in love with Lola, a mysterious young woman who is new to the city. When Lola receives a job as a fashion designer, Frank becomes jealous of her boss, Keith Winkleman, even though Keith makes it clear that he does not make a habit of sleeping with his employees. When Frank discovers a one-night stand Lola had in a hotel with an unknown man from out of town, he storms out feeling angry and betrayed. Drinking alone in a bar, he sees a man abusing his girlfriend. He follows the man outside and beats him in a fit of rage. Lola bails him out of jail the next morning and confides in him that her mother Patricia's previous boyfriend Alan Larsson, a Swedish millionaire, had raped her the previous summer. She cites the resulting mental trauma as reason for her infidelity. Frank becomes obsessed with exacting revenge on Alan, and begins finding out details about him online.

One night, Frank is hired to cook dinner for Keith, who, impressed with his culinary skills, flies him out to Paris for a trial with a French restaurateur. Frank uses the trip as an opportunity to find Alan, intent on killing him. He tracks Alan down using information he gathered online, and follows him to a local bistro. He introduces himself as "Keith", and tells Alan that he read his memoirs while studying at Northwestern University, where Alan was previously a professor. Impressed that Frank is a "fan", he invites him back to his place for a drink. Once there, Alan becomes suspicious of Frank and deduces that Frank never attended Northwestern University and is in reality there to kill him. Frank confronts him with a knife he concealed in his sleeve about Lola's rape, which Alan denies. Alan then shows Frank a sex tape with Lola and another woman, that shows Lola taking sexual orders from Alan. Alan explains that the two of them were romantically involved and they had picked up the other woman from their favorite sex club. Alan invites Frank to the club where he has a one-night stand with a wealthy Parisian woman and her friend. Meanwhile, the restaurateur is impressed with Frank and he gets a job as the head chef in their new Las Vegas restaurant.

Frank flies back to Las Vegas, and after having sex with Lola, informs her that he has learned the truth from Alan and announces that he is leaving her. The next morning, Frank deduces that the unknown man Lola had slept with was Alan, and asks Lola to tell him the truth about her affair with him. Lola tells Frank that the wealthy woman who picked him up in the club was in reality Alan's wife Claire, and that Alan brings her men to sleep with in exchange for her allowing him to do whatever he wants. She explains that Alan did in fact rape her while she was studying fashion in Paris, but that she had fallen in love with him due to Stockholm syndrome. She discovered that she became pregnant with Alan's child, and that Alan left her upon discovering this. Claire offered her a $400,000 check if Lola were to get an abortion and leave Paris, which she reluctantly agreed to, and moved to Las Vegas, where she then met Frank. Lola and Frank then tearfully break up with one another.

After a meeting with the restaurateur in Paris, he visits Claire who confirms Lola's side of things. Frank then tracks Alan down again while he is in Las Vegas, hoping to have another encounter with Lola. He puts a letter through Alan's door pretending to be Lola and asking him to meet her in the hotel's closed restaurant, which is actually Frank's new restaurant. There he confronts Alan a final time, and gets him to confess on camera that he thinks nothing of his wife and considers Lola to be his "prize". When Frank attempts to blackmail Alan into leaving them alone by sending the surveillance tape to Claire via her email, Alan attacks him. Frank gains the upper hand and beats Alan into submission, finally getting him to leave Las Vegas and Lola alone.

Sometime later, Keith's company hosts a dinner at Frank's new restaurant, and Keith congratulates him for his success. Lola arrives late to the dinner, and is surprised to find that the restaurant is Frank's. Frank explains that he made "that psycho" (Alan) leave her alone forever, and attempts to rekindle their relationship. Lola is unsure, but Frank asks her to think about it while he goes upstairs to get changed. When he comes back, he is heartbroken to find that Lola is no longer at the bar. However, Lola's reflection can be seen in one of the doors, watching Frank, leaving the status of their relationship ambiguous.

== Cast ==
- Michael Shannon as Frank Reilly
- Imogen Poots as Lola
- Michael Nyqvist as Alan Larsson
- Justin Long as Keith Winkleman
- Emmanuelle Devos as Claire Larsson
- Rosanna Arquette as Patricia
- David Atrakchi as Charles
- Carlos Moreno Jr. as Javier
- Stella Schnabel as Hazel
- Patrick Rocca as Henri Ricard
- Narcisse Mame as Khalil
- Maynor Alvarado as Luis
- Amy Lawhorn Argyle as Rachel
- Elisha Yaffe as Will
- Sophie Meister as Isobel

== Production ==
Writer/director Matthew Ross originally wrote the script nearly a decade before the film was shot. In the original screenplay, instead of Las Vegas the film was set in Brooklyn. He said, "An opportunity came up from producers and financiers who said that if I moved the film to downtown Las Vegas, they would finance it. Initially I was hesitant. I'd been living with the script for eight years at that point, and my experience with Las Vegas was probably pretty typical of most people who don't live there – hotels on The Strip and staying up all night in casinos. It just didn't feel real to me, and I wanted these characters to feel real. So in order to make that transition and to translate the movie, I spent more time in Vegas, specifically downtown, to try to get a sense of what it was like ... I discovered that there's a really cool and exciting, vibrant arts and culture scene there that's just been developing downtown." Ross believes the Vegas setting made for a better film, adding, "Yes, it took eight years to get the film made, but I also got to really refine the script. And if I'd made it earlier, it wouldn't have been as tight as it was when we shot it. Now I couldn't imagine it being anywhere else but Vegas – it's kind of the perfect backdrop for these two lonely, damaged characters in the movie. So it all really worked out perfectly."

In February 2014, it was announced Lola Pictures, Killer Films, Parts and Labor, and Preferred Content joined to produce the film, with Jan Van Hoy, Lars Knudsen, Christine Vachon, Kevin Iwashina, and John Baker to produce the film. In February 2015, Arclight Films announced that it had acquired all international sales rights for the film. In July 2015, the Sundance Institute selected Frank & Lola and director Matthew Ross to take part in its Feature Film Program's annual Music and Sound Design Labs at George Lucas's Skywalker Ranch. Frank & Lola was one of two completed featured films selected out the Lab's eight total projects. Saunder Jurriaans and Danny Bensi composed the film's score.

== Release ==
The film had its world premiere at the 2016 Sundance Film Festival on January 27, 2016. Shortly after, Universal Studios acquired worldwide distribution rights, excluding a few territories, with Paladin co-distributing the film. The film was released in a limited release and through video on demand on December 9, 2016.

=== Critical reception ===
On review aggregator Rotten Tomatoes, the film has an approval rating of 69%, based on reviews from 42 critics, with an average rating of 6.04/10. On Metacritic, which assigns a normalized rating to reviews, the film has a score of 56 out of 100, based on reviews from 18 critics.

In a 4-star review for The Guardian, Nigel Smith wrote: "Dark and sexy, Frank & Lola is always one step ahead of its audience, to deliver a haunting examination of male obsession and domination, that also serves as a weird sort of love story ... Shannon is superb, investing Frank with a surprising amount of tenderness even as he grows increasingly irate with Lola and her profusion of untruths. He's an alluring and dangerous lead, perfectly paired with Poots, who more than holds her own to finally deliver on all the promise she's shown in films less worthy of her talents."

Indiewire's Rodrigo Perez reviewed the film, writing, "There's a bewitching and intensely intoxicating quality to the opening act of Frank & Lola, a seductive, romantic noir turned psychosexual drama from assured first-time feature director Matthew Ross…Ross is a major talent worth watching. He's got an eye, a strong p.o.v, and the movie has many perceptive observations about the self-destructive perils of possessiveness, ownership and holding on too tight."

The Hollywood Reporter's Stephen Farber called Frank & Lola a "haunting dissection of male jealousy…Other films have focused on sexual jealousy, but Ross and Shannon probe deeper than most into the poisonous, compulsive nature of male suspicion…Ross has described Frank & Lola as a neo-noir, and it does deserve comparison with similarly dark character studies (such as Nicholas Ray's In a Lonely Place) from Hollywood's golden age of noir. This movie casts a troubling spell."

In Consequence of Sound, Michael Roffman wrote: "Part drama, part psychosexual thriller, part revenge fantasy, Michael Shannon's latest platform balls up the dark mystery of Polanski, the vivid passion of De Palma, and the razor tension of Hitchcock for a savvy and meticulous 90 mins…Frank & Lola is an electric modern noir that thrives from indelible characters and a palatable style. As both screenwriter and director, Ross proves he's a filmmaker with not just something to say, but somewhere to take us. Rest assured, our passports are ready."

The Film Stage's Ed Frankel: "Frank & Lola, a noirish erotic thriller from journalist-turned-director Matthew Ross, finds leads Michael Shannon and Imogen Poots in top form. They excel as lovers in this tightly-wound psychosexual love story that has elements of the best of Eyes Wide Shut…Frank & Lola has some of that film's noir-esque aesthetic, too, with hints of Michael Mann's night-time city look…Carried by two accomplished performances, and despite a tight 87-minute running time, this is a rich saga, bathed in atmosphere that disturbs as much as it engrosses. It's certainly not a date movie, and all the better for it."

Deadline's Anthony D'Alessandro: "The former Variety reporter and Filmmaker editor has crafted a complex psycho-sexual love story here, with hues of Jacques Audiard's The Beat That My Heart Skipped, Francis Ford Coppola's The Conversation and Bernardo Bertolucci's Last Tango in Paris, among other titles."

The Boston Globe included the film in its "Finding Winners at Sundance" wrap-up, with critic Ty Burr saying that: "This feature debut from writer-director Matthew Ross teases intriguing interference patterns out of its various genres, moods, and locations…It's great to see a Vegas movie without a single scene set in a casino, and when Frank & Lola hops the Atlantic to Paris…Ross uses the Marais district and the Place des Vosges with a similarly fresh and unnerving eye…Ross is one to keep an eye on."

At JoBlo.com, Chris Bumbray gave Frank & Lola and 8/10 rating, writing that "Even if their relationship is toxic, for some strange reason you want them patch things up and live happily ever after. This is nuts considering how crazy they both are, but Ross makes it work…One thing that's significant about Frank & Lola is that it's a legitimately serious film about sex, something that's increasingly rare these days…Ross has a really sharp eye, with it having a rich, sophisticated look that gives the film studio-level production values. The acting - of course - is superb with Shannon getting a showcase part that plays to his strengths. Poots is similarly good… It's a sexy, adult thriller that doesn't pander and never feels artificial. This one will likely find an appreciative audience and makes for a promising debut for writer/director Ross."

Ross and Frank & Lola were also included on a number of "Best of Sundance" roundups. Indiewire listed Ross as #3 on its list of "25 Filmmakers and Actors Who Rocked Sundance," saying that "Michael Shannon is in almost literally a dozen movies this year, but we wonder if he'll get a better showcase across the rest of 2016 as he does in Sundance movie Frank & Lola, and the man responsible, Matthew Ross, should get a ton of attention as a result. A former film journalist, Ross made a number of acclaimed shorts including Lola and Inspired by Bret Easton Ellis, but makes a striking debut with this feature." Additionally, The Film Stage named Frank & Lola as one of 15 best films of the festival, and Ioncinema included Ross on its list "Top 10 New Voices" at Sundance 2016.
