= Where I'm From (Passion song) =

Single by Passion

from the album Baller's Lady
- Released: 1996
- Recorded: 1995
- Genre: Hip hop; R&B
- Length: 3:27
- Label: MCA
- Songwriter(s): Passion Broussard; Kevin Irving; Valerie Webb
- Producer(s): Studio Ton

Passion singles chronology
"Where I'm From" (1996)	"Gigolos Get Lonely Too" (1996)

"Where I'm From" is the lead single by American former rapper Passion taken from her only studio album, Baller's Lady. Released in early 1996, the song became a minor hit on the Billboard Hot Rap Songs charts.

== Background ==
The song samples the 1988 Too Short and Rappin' 4-Tay song, "Don't Fight the Feelin'", which originally sampled the 1982 One Way song of the same name.

"Where I'm From" was produced by Studio Ton and written by Passion Broussard, Kevin Irving, and Valerie Webb.

== The Remix ==
The album's final track, "Don't Fight the Remix" is a remixed version of the song and features performances from Rappin' 4-Tay, Too Short and Soul Depot. This remix is a bonus track exclusive to the CD release.

A clean version of the remix, titled the "Don't Fight the Clean Mix II", appeared in the 1996 film Bulletproof and was released as a single and a music video to promote the film's soundtrack.

== Chart positions ==
Chart	Position
Bubbling Under Hot 100	108
Hot Rap Singles	29
Hot R&B/Hip-Hop Singles & Tracks	88
