= Alex Tse =

American screenwriter (born 1976)

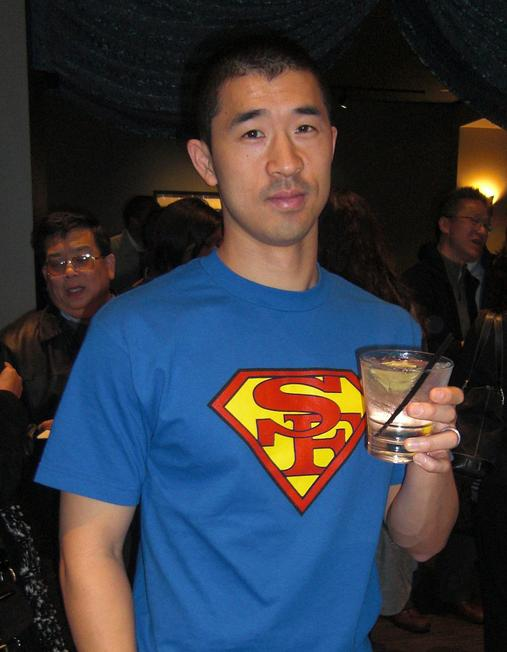
- Alex Tse in 2009
- Born: 1976 (age 49–50); San Francisco, California, United States
- Occupation: Screenwriter; Television show creator; Executive producer
- Years active: 2004–present

Alex Tse (born 1976) is an American screenwriter and television show creator active since 2004. He was one of the creators and executive producers of the TV series Wu-Tang: An American Saga (2019–2023). Prior to that, Tse wrote the 2004 gangster film Sucker Free City, co-wrote the 2009 superhero film Watchmen, and wrote the 2018 film Superfly.

Tse grew up in San Francisco and attended Emerson College in Boston.

== Background ==
Alex Tse, a Chinese American, was born in 1976 to a banker father and a teacher mother. He grew up in the Richmond District in San Francisco. He went to Alamo Elementary School, Presidio Middle School, and Lowell High School in the area. When Tse was growing up, his parents were movie fans, and he was incidentally exposed to movies not appropriate for his age like Heavy Metal, Prom Night, and Altered States. His father's favorite film was The Godfather, and the family would watch two films every Christmas, such as To Live and Die in L.A..

Tse attended Emerson College in Boston. When Tse was a first-year student at Emerson, he explored journalism as a career by having a radio show and realized that it was not his aspiration. He saw Pulp Fiction and was inspired by the film to pursue a screenwriting career. He described Pulp Fiction's influence on him:

I had never seen anything like it, in terms of narrative structure, characters, the character's point of view, all the pop culture references and humor. It seemed like it was coming from my own sensibility... though the world of Pulp Fiction is so fantastic and obviously not my world, it felt like these were characters who were speaking from the perspective of people in your world. And I don't know that a movie has done that since.

After Tse graduated from college, he moved to Los Angeles in December 1998 to pursue a writing career. He worked for under three years producing rap videos and working part-time jobs for Miramax Films and Walt Disney Pictures. One of his first productions was the music video for the single "You Never Knew" from the album 3rd Eye Vision by Hieroglyphics, and the video eventually aired on Yo! MTV Raps. His work attracted the attention of other independent rappers, for whom he also produced videos. He was encouraged to begin temping and found temp work at Disney, particularly under then-president Peter Schneider. Tse also learned more about screenwriting by reading scripts, with two noteworthy examples being the onomatopoeia in James Mangold's script for Heavy and the sarcasm in the narrative for Man on the Moon.

== Career ==
After three years of small jobs, Tse sold to television-based Showtime a script called 87 Fleer, about four middle-class kids from the Richmond District. The company was impressed with his script and encouraged him to write a pilot about gangs. By June 2002, Tse submitted a first-story outline titled The Game for a potential television series. By the following September, the outline was developed into a full script that eventually became the Showtime television movie Sucker Free City (2004), directed by Spike Lee. For the film, Tse won a literary award from PEN Center USA for best teleplay, and he was nominated for best screenplay (original or adapted) for the 2006 Black Reel Awards. After Sucker Free City was released, Tse and Lee discussed the possibility of producing a feature film based on Tse's first script 87 Fleer. Tse developed a script for an untitled project for the singer Ashanti. He also developed a script for a remake of Super Fly (1972) for Warner Bros. and Silver. Tse said that the remake "had nothing to do with the original" and that it evolved into a possible film titled Gangland.

After Sucker Free City, Tse performed uncredited production rewrites for such films as House of Wax, Step Up, and its sequel, Step Up 2: The Streets. He was also attached as screenwriter to adapt the following films that went unproduced: the 1951 science-fiction short-story collection The Illustrated Man and the 2005 American thriller novel The Winter of Frankie Machine. Tse's major screenwriting debut came when he was a co-writer for the 2009 superhero film Watchmen, which was directed by Zack Snyder. He and fellow screenwriter David Hayter were nominated for a Saturn Award for Best Writing for Watchmen. After Watchmen, Tse was attached to adapt the following films that went unproduced: 1961 children's book The Phantom Tollbooth and the 2005 science fiction novel The Traveler. In 2012, Tse said he was planning to make his directorial debut with 87 Fleer. Toward the end of 2013, Tse was hired by Columbia Pictures to write the script for a film adaptation of the racing video game series Gran Turismo. The Hollywood Reporter called Tse "one of the bigger names in genre screenwriting" for his work on the following films that went unproduced: a remake of The Crow, a live-action remake of the anime film Ninja Scroll, a film adaptation of the graphic novel Battling Boy by Paul Pope, and a remake of Highlander.

Tse optioned in 2014 the rights to the 2010 graphic novel Tribes: The Dog Years by Michael Geszel and Peter Spinetta with an interest in writing and producing a film adaptation. In 2017, the film was in development with Tse executive producing with Joel Silver's Silver Pictures. Later in the year, Sony Pictures bought the rights to Super Fly to remake the film based on a script by Tse. The remake, titled Superfly, premiered in June 2018.

In April 2018, Alex Tse was writing the screenplay for The Last Masters, a martial arts action thriller that is a US-China co-production between Global Road Entertainment and Tang Media Partners. In the following October, Hulu ordered the ten-episode drama Wu-Tang: An American Saga, a series about the American hip hop group Wu-Tang Clan. The series, which premiered in September 2019, was created and written by The RZA and Tse.

In 2023, the film Gran Turismo was released, with Tse and Jason Hall credited for the story (Hall and Zach Baylin were credited for the screenplay).

== Credits ==
Tse's credits
Year	Title	Medium	Notes
2004	Sucker Free City	Television film	Writer
2009	Watchmen	Feature film	Screenplay by Tse and David Hayter
2018	Superfly	Feature film	Writer
2019	Wu-Tang: An American Saga	Television series	Creator, writer, executive producer
2023	Gran Turismo	Feature film	Story by Tse and Jason Hall; screenplay by Hall and Zach Baylin

== Personal life ==
Tse's favorite films include Annie Hall and Major League.

In 2006, Tse married Lisa, a graphic designer.

== See also ==
- History of the Chinese Americans in San Francisco
