= Siddiq Saunderson =

American actor

- Born: December 15, 1996 (age 29); New York City, New York
- Occupation: Actor
- Years active: 2013–present

Siddiq Saunderson is an American actor. He is best known for playing Dennis 'D-Love' Coles in the drama series Wu-Tang: An American Saga and Maurice in season 4 of the drama series Godfather of Harlem.

== Early life ==
Saunderson was born in Brooklyn, New York City. He grew up acting in plays in elementary school and middle school and went to a performing arts school in Brooklyn. He is a graduate of Carnegie Mellon University. He moved to Los Angeles soon after for more acting opportunities.

== Career ==
Early on in his career he made a one off appearance in the comedy series Boomerang portraying Dallas. His first recurring role was playing Keon Woods in the thriller series Messiah He received rave reviews for his performance as Mercutio in the romantic drama film R and J, a gen z adaption of Romeo & Juliet. His biggest role in his career so far has been portraying Dennis 'D-Love' Coles in the drama series Wu-Tang: An American Saga. He played Khalif, one of the lead characters in the drama film Kemba satrring Nesta Cooper. He made an appearance in 3 episodes of the crime show Blue Bloods and had a recurring role as Maurice in season 4 of the drama series Godfather of Harlem.

== Filmography ==
=== Film ===
Year	Title	Role	Notes
2013	It Felt Like Love	Sweet 16 Party Guest	Short
2018	Not Like Other Girls	Josh	Short
2021	R and J	Mercutio	
2021	Mother's Milk	Sparrow	
2024	Kemba	Khalif	
2024	Meal Ticket	Saint	Short
2025	The Late Night Creep	Marcus	
2026	ANSWR		

=== Television ===
Year	Title	Role	Notes
2013	Redwood Time	Partygoer	Episode; London Guy(Part IV)
2019	Boomerang	Dallas	Episode; Game Night
2020	Messiah	Keon Woods	3 episodes
2023	East New York	Terry Green	Episode; Up in Smoke
2019-2023	Wu-Tang: An American Saga	Dennis 'D-Love' Coles	30 episodes
2024	Blue Bloods	Fence	3 episodes
2025	Godfather of Harlem	Maurice	7 episodes
2026	The Terror: Devil in Silver	Mr. Mack's Son	Episodes; Disturbed, Vermillion
