= Off Parole =

Studio album by Rappin' 4-Tay
- Released: March 19, 1996
- Studios: One Little Indian Studio (Richmond, CA); The Enterprise (Los Angeles, CA); Kirv Productions (Hollywood, CA); Find-A-Way Studios (Hayward, CA); Dangerous Music (Atlanta, GA); Bay View Productions Studio (San Francisco, CA); Premier Studio (San Francisco, CA); Encore Studios (Los Angeles, CA); Frisco Studios (San Francisco, CA); Tight Out Da Gate Studio (San Francisco, CA)
- Genres: West Coast hip-hop; gangsta rap; g-funk
- Length: 1:11:35
- Label: Chrysalis
- Producers: Al Eaton; Dave G; Doug Rasheed; G-Man Stan; Kirv; Les G; Mike Dean; Rappin' 4-Tay; Reg; T.C.; The Enhancer; Too $hort

Rappin' 4-Tay chronology
Don't Fight the Feelin' (1994)	Off Parole (1996)	4 tha Hard Way (1997)

Singles from Off Parole
- 1. "Ain't No Playa" Released: 1996; 2. "A Lil Som'em Som'em" Released: 1996

Professional ratings
Review scores
Source	Rating
AllMusic	3/5 stars

Off Parole is the third studio album by American rapper Rappin' 4-Tay. It was released on March 19, 1996 via Chrysalis Records. The recording sessions took place at One Little Indian Studio in Richmond, at The Enterprise and Encore Studios in Los Angeles, at Kirv Productions in Hollywood, at Find-A-Way Studios in Hayward, at Dangerous Music in Atlanta, at Bay View Productions Studio, Premier Studio, Frisco Studios and Tight Out Da Gate Studio in San Francisco.

Production was handled by Al Eaton, G-Man Stan, Mike Dean, Reggie-Reg, T.C., Dave G, Doug Rasheed, Kevin "Kirv" Irving, Les G, The Enhancer, Too $hort and 4-Tay himself, with Frank "Franky J." Hudson Jr. serving as executive producer. It features guest appearances from Passion, D-Moe, Fly Nate Tha Banksta, Franky J., Hugh EMC, JT the Bigga Figga, Kandice Love, Lil' Fly, MC Breed, Primo, San Quinn, Seff Tha Gaffla, Too $hort, T-Lowe, and 4-Tay's seven-year-old daughter Jasmyne Forté. In the United States, the album reached number 38 on the Billboard 200 and number 10 on the Top R&B/Hip-Hop Albums charts.

There were four music videos directed to promote the album: "Never Talk Down", "A Lil' Some'em Some'em", "Ain't No Playa (Playaz Shit)" and "Off Parole". The song "Never Talk Down" slightly differs from the one presented on Too $hort's Gettin' It (Album Number Ten).

== Track listing ==
No.	Title	Writer(s)	Producer(s)	Length
1.	"I Paid My Dues" (featuring Kandice Love)	Anthony Forté; Al Eaton	Al Eaton	4:25
2.	"New Trump" (featuring Lil Fly)	Forté; Mike Dean	Mike Dean	4:14
3.	"A Lil' Some'em Some'em" (featuring Gary Mackey and Sugar)	Forté; Eaton	Al Eaton	5:37
4.	"Check Ya Self"	Forté; Kevin Irving	Kirv	3:27
5.	"Ain't No Playa (Playaz Shit)" (featuring Passion)	Forté; Stan Keith; Shannon Lacy	G-Man Stan	5:02
6.	"Never Talk Down" (featuring Too $hort and MC Breed)	Forté; Todd Shaw; Eric Breed	Too $hort; Rappin' 4-Tay	5:37
7.	"25-2-Life"	Forté; Don Marsh	The Enhancer	5:04
8.	"Boogie Bang Bang" (featuring Franky J.)	Forté; Tomie Witherspoon; Reggie Smith	T.C.; Regi-Reg	4:29
9.	"Comin' Back"	Forté; Doug Rasheed	Doug Rasheed	4:04
10.	"Hala at a Playa"	Forté; David Golostin	Dave G	4:11
11.	"Game on the Shelf" (featuring JT the Bigga Figga, San Quinn and Seff Tha Gaffla)	Forté; Joseph Tom; Quincy Brooks; Yusef Sterling; Witherspoon; Reggie Smith	T.C.; Regi-Reg	3:43
12.	"Off Parole"	Forté; Dean	Mike Dean	4:14
13.	"Where's the Party" (featuring Charles Hill, Ron Kenoly and Sean Tayco)	Forté; Eaton	Al Eaton	4:56
14.	"Phat Like That" (featuring Jasmyne Forté)	Forté; Leslie Gray	Les G	3:42
15.	"Still Phuckin with My Folks" (featuring Primo, T-Lowe, D-Moe, Nate The Banksta and Hugh E. MC)	Forté; Keith	G-Man Stan	4:47
16.	"Ain't No Playa (Radio Mix)"			4:13
Total length:				1:11:35

Sample credits

- Track 3 contains an interpolation of "I Want'a Do Something Freaky to You" written by Leon Haywood.
- Track 9 contains an interpolation of "Everything's Gonna Be Alright" written by Eban Kelly and Jimi Randolph.
- Track 13 contains an interpolation of "High" written by Randy Mullen.

== Personnel ==
- Anthony "Rappin' 4-Tay" Forté – vocals, producer (track 6)
- Kandice Love – vocals (track 1)
- Gary "Lil' Fly" Hudson – vocals (track 2), co-producer
- Gary Mackey – vocals (track 3)
- Sugar – vocals (track 3)
- Passion – vocals (track 5)
- Todd "Too $hort" Shaw – vocals & producer (track 6)
- Eric Breed – vocals (track 6)
- Frank "Franky J." Hudson Jr. – vocals (track 8), executive producer, photography
- Joseph "JT the Bigga Figga" Tom – vocals (track 11)
- Quincy "San Quinn" Brooks – vocals (track 11)
- Yusef "Seff Tha Gaffla" Sterling – vocals (track 11)
- Charles Hill – vocals (track 13)
- Ron Kenoly – vocals (track 13)
- Sean Tayco – vocals (track 13)
- Jasmyne Forté – vocals (track 14)
- Lionel "Primo" Primus – vocals (track 15)
- T-Lowe – vocals (track 15)
- D. "D-Moe" Morris – vocals (track 15)
- Fly Nate Tha Banksta – vocals (track 15)
- Hugh E. Gregory – vocals (track 15)
- Barry "Race" Smith – bass (track 8)
- Al Eaton – producer (tracks: 1, 3, 13)
- Mike Dean – producer (tracks: 2, 12)
- Kevin "Kirv" Irving – producer (track 4)
- "G-Man Stan" Keith – producer (tracks: 5, 15)
- Don "The Enhancer" Marsh – producer (track 7)
- Tomie "T.C." Witherspoon – producer (tracks: 8, 11)
- Reggie "Reg" Smith – producer (tracks: 8, 11)
- Doug Rasheed – producer (track 9)
- David "Dave G" Golostin – producer (track 10)
- Leslie "Les G" Gray – producer (track 14)
- Pat Johnson – photography
- Tar – photography
- Kiki – photography

== Charts ==
Chart (1996)	Peak position
US Billboard 200	38
US Top R&B/Hip-Hop Albums (Billboard)	10
