= Playaz Club =

Single by Rappin' 4-Tay

from the album Don't Fight the Feelin'
- Released: August 16, 1994
- Recorded: 1994
- Genre: G-funk; West Coast hip hop
- Length: 4:26
- Label: Chrysalis
- Songwriter: Anthony Forté
- Producers: Cyrus Esteban; Franky J

Rappin' 4-Tay singles chronology
"Playaz Club" (1994)	"I'll Be Around" (1995)

"Playaz Club" is the lead single from Rappin' 4-Tay's second album, Don't Fight the Feelin'. The song was produced by Cyrus Esteban and Frank "Franky J" Hudson, Jr. who used a sample of Judy Clay and William Bell's 1968 hit "Private Number".

Released in August 1994, "Playaz Club" became the first of two top 40 hits for Rappin' 4-Tay and was his biggest hit on the Billboard Hot 100, peaking at number 36.

== Track listing ==
=== A-side ===
1. "Playaz Club" (Radio Version) – 4:24
2. "Playaz Club" (Album Version) – 4:24

=== B-side ===
1. "Playaz Club" (Clean Version) – 4:24
2. "Playaz Club" (Instrumental) – 4:20

== Charts ==
Chart (1994)	Peak position
Billboard Hot 100	36
Billboard Hot R&B Singles	54
Billboard Hot Rap Singles	10
Billboard Hot Dance Music/Maxi-Singles Sales	22
Billboard Rhythmic Top 40	10
