= Don't Fight the Feelin' =

Studio album by Rappin' 4-Tay
- Released: July 26, 1994
- Recorded: 1993–1994
- Studio: Graffiti Tunez (West Oakland, California); Buck Fifty Records; Bay View Productions; Sucka Free City; JT's in the Mo
- Length: 67:12
- Label: Chrysalis; Rag Top
- Producer: Franky J; Ant Banks; Black C; Cyrus Esteban; Gigolo G; J-Mack; JT the Bigga Figga; Lil' Fly; T.C.

Rappin' 4-Tay chronology
Rappin' 4-Tay Is Back (1991)	Don't Fight the Feelin' (1994)	Off Parole (1996)

Singles from Don't Fight the Feelin'
- 1. "Playaz Club" Released: 1994; 2. "I'll Be Around" Released: 1994

Professional ratings
Review scores
Source	Rating
AllMusic	4.5/5 stars

Don't Fight the Feelin' is the second studio album by American rapper Rappin' 4-Tay from San Francisco, California. It was released on July 26, 1994 via Chrysalis Records and Rag Top Records. Recording session took place at Graffiti Tunez in West Oakland, at Buck Fifty Records, at Bay View Productions, at Sucka Free City and at JT's in the Mo. Production was handled by Ant Banks, Black C of RBL Posse, Cyrus Esteban, Gigolo G, J-Mack, JT the Bigga Figga, Lil' Fly, T.C., and Franky J, who also served as executive producer. The album features guest appearances from fellow San Francisco-based rappers JT the Bigga Figga, Lil' Fly and Seff tha Gaffla.

The album spawned two charted singles, "Playaz Club" and "I'll Be Around", which made it to numbers 36 and 39 respectively on the Billboard Hot 100 singles chart in the United States. The album itself peaked at number 174 on the Billboard 200 and at number 52 on the Top R&B/Hip-Hop Albums.

The album title was named for the song "Don't Fight the Feelin'" on Too $hort's 1988 album Life Is...Too Short, which is where Rappin' 4-Tay made his mainstream debut.

== Track listing ==
Don't Fight the Feelin'
No.	Title	Length
1.	"Back Again"	2:12
2.	"Dank Season" (featuring Seff tha Gaffla)	4:34
3.	"Keep One in the Chamba"	3:24
4.	"Can U Buckem'"	4:16
5.	"Just Cause I Called You a Bitch"	2:59
6.	"Playaz Club"	4:26
7.	"She's a Sell Out"	5:09
8.	"I'll Be Around"	5:47
9.	"Tear the Roof Off"	4:20
10.	"Sucka Free"	4:43
11.	"Call It What You Want Too"	4:56
12.	"I Got Cha Back" (featuring JT the Bigga Figga & Lil' Fly)	4:08
13.	"This Is What I Know"	3:38
14.	"The Gift"	4:12
15.	"Out 4000"	3:53
16.	"Playaz Club (Remix)" (hidden track)	4:35
Total length:		67:12

Notes

- Only the first pressing of this album contained the original version of "I'll Be Around" with a running time of 5:16, which is not available on the single or any other album. All subsequent pressings of this album contained a remixed version of "I'll Be Around" with a running time of 5:47. The most obvious difference between the original version and the remix is that in the remix the music starts at the very beginning during the phone call, in the original the music doesn't start until after the phone call intro.

=== Sample credits ===
- Track 6 contains a sample of the guitar riff from "Private Number" by Judy Clay and William Bell
- Track 7 contains the line "You can't trust a big butt and a smile", repeated many times in the background, from "Jimmy" by Boogie Down Productions; and "Don't Fight the Feelin'" by Too $hort
- Track 8 contains a sample of the chorus from "I'll Be Around" by The Spinners.

== Personnel ==
- Anthony Forté – main artist, lyrics, vocals
- Seff Tha Gaffla – featured artist (track 2)
- Joseph Tom – featured artist (track 12), engineering, producer
- Gary Hudson – featured artist (track 12), engineering, producer
- Erica Gilles – vocals
- Frank Hudson Jr. – engineering, producer, executive producer
- Cyrus Esteban – engineering, producer
- Gigolo Gee – engineering, producer
- Tomie Witherspoon – engineering, producer
- Anthony Banks – producer
- Christopher Matthews – producer
- John Young – producer
- Ken Lee – mastering

== Charts ==
Chart performance for Don't Fight the Feelin'
Chart (1994)	Peak position
US Billboard 200	174
US Top R&B/Hip-Hop Albums (Billboard)	52
US Heatseekers Albums (Billboard)	4
