= Rappin' 4-Tay =

American rapper

- Also known as: 4-Tay
- Born: Anthony H. Forté; March 2, 1968 (age 58)
- Origin: San Francisco, California, U.S.
- Genres: West Coast hip hop; G-funk
- Occupations: Rapper; songwriter; record producer
- Years active: 1988–present
- Labels: Chrysalis; Rag Top; EMI; Noo Trybe; Virgin
- Formerly of: T.W.D.Y.; The Dangerous Crew

Anthony H. Forté (born March 2, 1968), known professionally as Rappin' 4-Tay, is an American rapper from San Francisco, California.

== Early life ==
Anthony Forte was born March 2, 1968, and grew up in San Francisco's Fillmore District. He has a twin sister. He has a son as well as three daughters.

== Music career ==
Right after high school, 4-Tay made his debut on the Too Short album Life Is...Too Short. He was later convicted on drug charges and served ten months in prison. Upon his release from prison he released his debut album Rappin' 4-Tay Is Back in 1991, and followed up in 1994 with Don't Fight the Feelin', which included the hits "Playaz Club" (which sampled the song "Private Number" by William Bell and Judy Clay and hit number 36 on the Billboard Hot 100), the "Dank Season" featuring Seff Tha Gaffla, and "I'll Be Around" (which hit number 39 on the US Hot 100, number 59 in Australia, and number one in New Zealand ).

In 1995, two Rappin' 4-Tay songs—"Problems" and "A Message for Your Mind"—were featured on the Dangerous Minds soundtrack. "A Message For Your Mind" sampled "I Want You Back" by The Jackson 5.

Rappin' 4-Tay's mainstream success has been scarce since then, but he was featured on 2Pac's All Eyez on Me album on the track "Only God Can Judge Me" in 1996 and Master P's West Coast Bad Boyz II compilation in 1997. 4-Tay was also an original member of Bay Area supergroup T.W.D.Y. in 1999.

In 2003 Rappin' 4-Tay released the album Gangsta Gumbo with the single "Burning, Burning", followed up by the album That's What You Thought in 2007. In 2010 He was featured on R&B Artist E. Broussard's song titled Big Game Droppin'.

He was featured on the song "My Alphabets" on fellow Bay Area rap veteran Mac Dre's 2004 album The Genie of the Lamp. In 2011, Rappin' 4-Tay, E-40 and Playalitical collaborated on a song entitled "Bounce It Like a Bad Check" which was featured on the Political Playboy Music album released by Playalitical. In 2012 Rappin' 4-Tay collaborated on the song "Picture a Nigga" with Lil' Gang$ta, as well as helping with his debut album.

In 2013, he headlined the main stage of Seattle Hempfest with artists Ditch, Tony Tag, Brian Meyers and more.

In May 2014, he appeared with E Bone415 in a music video about Alcatraz Island.

== "Playaz Club" controversy ==
In 2014, 4-Tay spoke out against Drake for using lyrics from 4-Tay's 1994 song "Playaz Club" in the collaboration "Who Do You Love?" with YG. The artists settled out of court with 4-Tay being promised $100,000 and future credits for the song. However, it was later revealed that Drake had not actually paid 4-Tay the $100,000.

4-Tay eventually received royalties for his contributions to "Who Do You Love?". In 2018, the royalties to both the YG single and "Playaz Club" were auctioned on Royalty Exchange and at one time had bids of upward of $38,250 with the seller reportedly being 4-Tay.

== Discography ==
Studio albums

- Rappin' 4-Tay Is Back (1991)
- Don't Fight the Feelin' (1994)
- Off Parole (1996)
- 4 tha Hard Way (1997)
- Bigga Than Da Game (1998)
- Introduction To Mackin' (1999)
- Gangsta Gumbo (2003)
- That's What You Thought (2007)
- The World Is A Ghetto (2008)
- Still Standing (Volume 1) (2011)
- Strictly Enforced (2011)
- Where Is The Love? (2011)
- My Favorites (Volume 1) (2012)

Collaborative albums

- Derty Werk (with T.W.D.Y.) (1999)
- Ghetto Visa (with Squirrel) (2007)
- The Lost Tapes (with Squirrel) (2009)
- Ghetto Visa (Volume 2) (with Squirrel) (2010)
- Exported Game (with Big Willie & Spike2ms) (2011)
- Born To Be A Player (with Benni Boom) (2012)
- Bay Overdose (with V-Town) (2013)

Mixtapes

- Dlk Enterprise Presents: Rappin' 4-Tay – Dlk Collabs (Volume 5) (2022)

Charted singles

Title	Year	Peak chart positions						Album
Title	Year	US	US R&B/HH	AUS	FRA	NZ	UK	Album
"Playaz Club"	1994	36	54	—	—	—	63	Don't Fight the Feelin'
"I'll Be Around" (featuring The Spinners)	1995	39	37	59	44	1	30	Don't Fight the Feelin'
"Ain't No Playa (Playaz Shit)"	1996	73	55	—	—	—	—	Off Parole

Other certified songs

Title	Year	Certifications	Album
"Only God Can Judge Me" (2Pac featuring Rappin' 4-Tay)	1996	RMNZ: Platinum	All Eyez on Me

Guest appearances

Title	Year	Other artist(s)	Album
"Don't Fight the Feelin'"	1988	Too Short	Life Is... Too Short
"Did You Get the Dank"	1993	JT the Bigga Figga	Playaz N the Game
"You Do Your Thang"	1994	—N/a	West Coast Bad Boyz, Vol. 1
"Root of All Evil"	1995	JT The Bigga Figga, San Quinn	Dwellin' in tha Labb
"Only God Can Judge Me"	1996	2Pac	All Eyez on Me
"Never Talk Down"	1996	Too Short, MC Breed	Gettin' It (Album Number Ten)
"Don't Fight the Remix"	1996	Passion, Too Short, Soul Depot	Baller's Lady
"Up's and Down's"	1997	—N/a	West Coast Bad Boyz II
"It's Goin' Down" (Remix)	1997	Celly Cel, E-40, B-Legit, Mack 10	The G Filez
"Playa Paraphernalia"	1997	Ant Banks, J-Dubb	Big Thangs
"Urban Rapsody"	1997	Rick James	Urban Rapsody
"World Famous"	1997	A Lighter Shade of Brown	A Lighter Shade of Brown
"360°"	1998	Eightball, Spice 1, E-40, Otis & Shug	Lost
"Dogghouse"	2000	Tha Eastsidaz, Twinz	Tha Eastsidaz
"Candi Coated"	2000	Latino Velvet, Candi	Velvet City
"Das OK"	2002	Spice 1	Spiceberg Slim
"Get High with Me"	2003	Frost, Shorty B	Somethin' 4 the Riderz

Soundtrack appearances

Title	Year	Other artist(s)	Album
"Problems"	1995		Dangerous Minds
"A Message for Your Mind"	1995		Dangerous Minds
"Where I'm From (Don't Fight the Clean Mix II)"	1996	Passion, Too Short, Soul Depot	Bulletproof
"Holla"	2000	Celly Cel, 2-Ton	Held Up
"Win or Lose"	2000		Baller Blockin'

== Videography ==
Music videos

Title	Year	Other artist(s)	Album
"Where I'm From (Don't Fight the Clean Mix II)"	1996	Passion, Too Short, Soul Depot	Baller's Lady & Bulletproof OST
"Dogghouse"	2000	Tha Eastsidaz, Twinz	Tha Eastsidaz
