= List of songs recorded by Melanie Martinez =

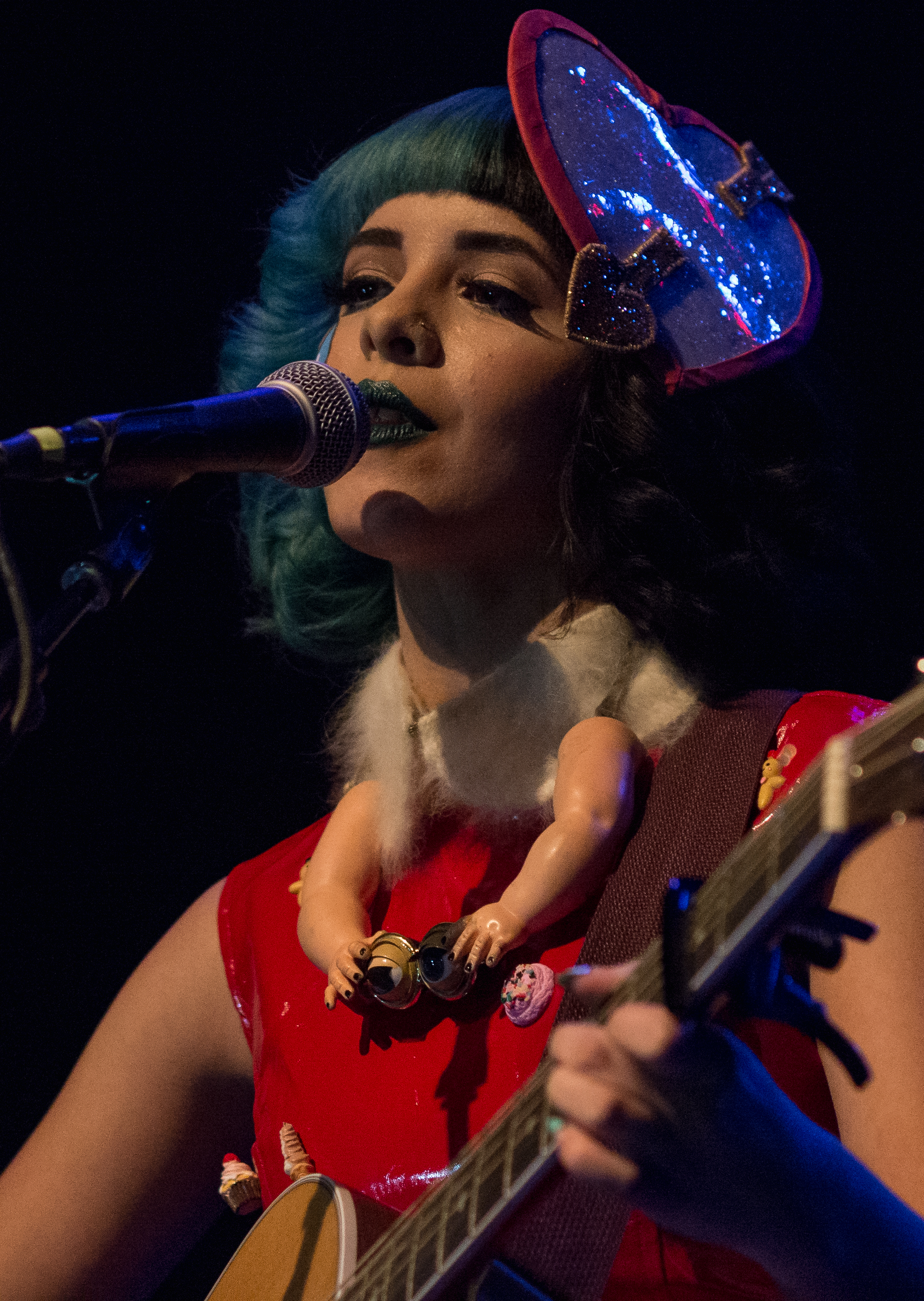
Martinez performing at Gramercy Theatre in New York City in February 2014

Melanie Martinez is the American singer and songwriter. She auditioned for the American television vocal talent show The Voice and became a member of Team Adam. Within the fifth week, she was eliminated which subsequently led to her beginning independent work on original material. In 2014, she released Dollhouse, her debut EP featuring the singles "Dollhouse" and "Carousel", which appeared on the trailer for the television series American Horror Story: Freak Show. In 2015, Martinez released her conceptual debut album titled Cry Baby, featuring the critically acclaimed lead single "Pity Party", along with other singles "Soap" and "Sippy Cup".

== Released songs ==
Key
| † | Indicates single release |
| ‡ | Indicates song included on an alternative version of the album |

| Title | Writer(s) | Album | Year | Ref |
|---|---|---|---|---|
| "Alphabet Boy" | Melanie Martinez; Jeremy Dussolliet; Tim Sommers | Cry Baby | 2015 |
| "Avoidant" | | Hades | 2026 |
| "The Bakery" † | Melanie Martinez; Blake Slatkin | After School | 2020 |
| "The Bakery" † | Melanie Martinez; Blake Slatkin | K–12 ‡ | 2020 |
| "Batshit Intelligence" | | Hades | 2026 |
| "Battle of the Larynx" | Melanie Martinez | Portals | 2023 |
| "Bittersweet Tragedy" | Melanie Martinez; Daniel Omelio | Dollhouse - EP | 2014 |
| "Brain & Heart" | Melanie Martinez; Michael Keenan; Fred Jerkins III; Jennifer Lopez; LaShawn Daniels; Cory Rooney; Rodney Jerkins | After School | 2020 |
| "Brain & Heart" | Melanie Martinez; Michael Keenan; Fred Jerkins III; Jennifer Lopez; LaShawn Daniels; Cory Rooney; Rodney Jerkins | K–12 ‡ | 2020 |
| "Cake" | Melanie Martinez; Christopher Baran | Cry Baby ‡ | 2015 |
| "Cake" | Melanie Martinez; Christopher Baran | Cry Baby's Extra Clutter | 2016 |
| "Carousel" † | Melanie Martinez; Jeremy Dussolliet; Tim Sommers | Dollhouse - EP | 2014 |
| "Carousel" † | Melanie Martinez; Jeremy Dussolliet; Tim Sommers | Cry Baby | 2015 |
| "Chatroom" | | Hades | 2026 |
| "Class Fight" | Melanie Martinez; Michael Keenan | K–12 | 2019 |
| "The Contortionist" | Melanie Martinez | Portals | 2023 |
| "Copy Cat" † | Melanie Martinez; Michael Keenan; Tierra Whack | Non-album single | 2020 |
| "Cry Baby" | Melanie Martinez; Jeremy Dussolliet; Tim Sommers | Cry Baby | 2015 |
| "Dead to Me" | Melanie Martinez; Jeremy Dussolliet; Tim Sommers | Dollhouse - EP | 2014 |
| "Death" † | Melanie Martinez | Portals | 2023 |
| "Detention" | Melanie Martinez; Michael Keenan | K–12 | 2019 |
| "Disney Princess" † | Melanie Martinez; Christopher Baran | Hades | 2026 |
| "Dollhouse" † | Melanie Martinez; Jeremy Dussolliet; Tim Sommers | Dollhouse - EP | 2014 |
| "Dollhouse" † | Melanie Martinez; Jeremy Dussolliet; Tim Sommers | Cry Baby | 2015 |
| "Drama Club" | Melanie Martinez; Jeremy Dussolliet; Tim Sommers | K–12 | 2019 |
| "Evil" | Melanie Martinez | Portals | 2023 |
| "Faerie Soirée" | Melanie Martinez | Portals | 2023 |
| "Field Trip" | Melanie Martinez; Michael Keenan | After School | 2020 |
| "Field Trip" | Melanie Martinez; Michael Keenan | K–12 ‡ | 2020 |
| "Fire Drill" † | Melanie Martinez; Michael Keenan | Non-album single | 2020 |
| "Garbage" | | Hades | 2026 |
| "Gingerbread Man" † | Melanie Martinez; Michael Keenan; Arthur McArthur | Cry Baby's Extra Clutter | 2016 |
| "Glued" | Melanie Martinez; Michael Keenan | After School | 2020 |
| "Glued" | Melanie Martinez; Michael Keenan | K–12 ‡ | 2020 |
| "Grudges" | | Hades | 2026 |
| "Gutter" | | Hades | 2026 |
| "Hell's Front Porch" | | Hades | 2026 |
| "High School Sweethearts" | Melanie Martinez; Michael Keenan | K–12 | 2019 |
| "Is This A Cult?" | Cameron Cade | Hades | 2026 |
| "The Last Two People On Earth" | | Hades | 2026 |
| "Leeches" | Melanie Martinez | Portals | 2023 |
| "Light Shower" | Melanie Martinez | Portals | 2023 |
| "Lunchbox Friends" | Melanie Martinez; Michael Keenan | K–12 | 2019 |
| "Mad Hatter" | Melanie Martinez; Jeremy Dussolliet; Bryan Fryzel; Aaron Kleinstub | Cry Baby | 2015 |
| "Milk and Cookies" | Melanie Martinez; Jeremy Dussolliet; Rick Markowitz | Cry Baby | 2015 |
| "Milk of the Siren" | Melanie Martinez | Portals ‡ | 2023 |
| "Monolith" | Melanie Martinez | Hades | 2026 |
| "Monopoly Man" | | Hades | 2026 |
| "Moon Cycle" | Melanie Martinez | Portals | 2023 |
| "Mrs. Potato Head" | Melanie Martinez; Jeremy Dussolliet; Tim Sommers | Cry Baby | 2015 |
| "Notebook" | Melanie Martinez; Michael Keenan | After School | 2020 |
| "Notebook" | Melanie Martinez; Michael Keenan | K–12 ‡ | 2020 |
| "Numbers" | Melanie Martinez; Michael Keenan | After School | 2020 |
| "Numbers" | Melanie Martinez; Michael Keenan | K–12 ‡ | 2020 |
| "Nurse's Office" | Melanie Martinez; Michael Keenan | K–12 | 2019 |
| "Nymphology" | Melanie Martinez | Portals | 2023 |
| "Orange Juice" | Melanie Martinez; Michael Keenan | K–12 | 2019 |
| "Pacify Her" | Melanie Martinez; Chloe Angelides; Michael Keenan | Cry Baby | 2015 |
| "Piggyback" | Melanie Martinez | Non-album single | 2017 |
| "Pity Party" † | Melanie Martinez; Christopher Baran; Kara DioGuardi; John Gluck; Wally Gold; Seymour Gottlieb; Herb Wiener | Cry Baby | 2015 |
| "Play Date" | Melanie Martinez; Jennifer Decilveo | Cry Baby ‡ | 2015 |
| "Play Date" | Melanie Martinez; Jennifer Decilveo | Cry Baby's Extra Clutter | 2016 |
| "Pluto" | Melanie Martinez | Portals ‡ | 2023 |
| "Possession" † | Melanie Martinez; Christopher Baran | Hades | 2026 |
| "Powder" | Melanie Martinez | Portals ‡ | 2023 |
| "The Plague" | | Hades | 2026 |
| "The Principal" | Melanie Martinez; Michael Keenan | K–12 | 2019 |
| "Recess" | Melanie Martinez; Michael Keenan; Emily Warren | K–12 | 2019 |
| "Show & Tell" | Melanie Martinez; Michael Keenan | K–12 | 2019 |
| "Sippy Cup" † | Melanie Martinez; Jeremy Dussolliet; Tim Sommers | Cry Baby | 2015 |
| "Soap" † | Melanie Martinez; Emily Warren; Kyle Shearer | Cry Baby | 2015 |
| "Spider Web" | Melanie Martinez | Portals | 2023 |
| "Strawberry Shortcake" | Melanie Martinez; Michael Keenan; Emily Warren | K–12 | 2019 |
| "Tag, You're It" | Melanie Martinez; Scott Harris; Rick Markowitz | Cry Baby | 2015 |
| "Teacher's Pet" | Melanie Martinez; Michael Keenan | K–12 | 2019 |
| "Teddy Bear" | Melanie Martinez; Phoebe Ryan; Felix Snow | Cry Baby ‡ | 2015 |
| "Teddy Bear" | Melanie Martinez; Phoebe Ryan; Felix Snow | Cry Baby's Extra Clutter | 2016 |
| "Test Me" | Melanie Martinez; Michael Keenan | After School | 2020 |
| "Test Me" | Melanie Martinez; Michael Keenan | K–12 ‡ | 2020 |
| "Training Wheels" | Melanie Martinez; Scott Hoffman | Cry Baby | 2015 |
| "Tunnel Vision" | Melanie Martinez | Portals | 2023 |
| "Uncanny Valley" | | Hades | 2026 |
| "The Vatican" | | Hades | 2026 |
| "Void" † | Melanie Martinez | Portals | 2023 |
| "Weight Watchers" | | Hades | 2026 |
| "Wheels on the Bus" | Melanie Martinez; Michael Keenan; Emily Warren | K–12 | 2019 |
| "White Boy With A Gun" | | Hades | 2026 |
| "Womb" | Melanie Martinez | Portals | 2023 |

== Unreleased songs ==
Key
| † | Denotes songs with leaked studio versions |
| † | Denotes songs with leaked non-studio versions |

| Title | Year | Writer(s) | Notes |
|---|---|---|---|
| "99 Cent Store" † | 2014 | Melanie Martinez; Jeremy Dussolliet; Tim Sommers | Failed to be included on Cry Baby (2015).; The studio version was leaked on September 17, 2018. |
| "Alone" | 2009 | Melanie Martinez | Published by Gap City Music and Warner-Tamerlane Publishing Corp. |
| "A Million Men" † | 2013 | Melanie Martinez | Published by Gap City Music and Warner-Tamerlane Publishing Corp.; The studio session leaked on May 7, 2016, via SoundCloud.; Known alternatively as "Million Men".; Has a fully produced studio version which remains unleaked.; Written as early as January 7, 2013; hand-written lyrics sheet is visible in a post Melanie made to Instagram. |
| "A Thousand Words" † | 2013 | Melanie Martinez; John Feldmann; Neon Hitch | Published by Gap City Music and Warner-Tamerlane Publishing Corp.; Known alternatively as "Thousand Words".; The studio version was leaked on February 19, 2021. |
| "AK-47" | 2016 | Melanie Martinez; HYDDE | |
| "Arts & Crafts" † | 2014 | Melanie Martinez; Joshua Monroy; Casey Goode | Failed to be included on Cry Baby (2015).; The studio version was leaked on May 14, 2021, via SoundCloud. |
| "Band-Aid" † | 2014 | Melanie Martinez; Bryan Fryzel; Aaron Kleinstub; Jeremy Dussolliet | Failed to be included on Cry Baby (2015).; The studio version was leaked on March 19, 2017, via SoundCloud.; The leaked demo was recorded sometime in July 2014. |
| "Barely Juice" † | 2021 | Melanie Martinez; Jeremy Dussolliet; Tim Sommers | Failed to be included on Portals (2023).; The studio version was leaked on November 4, 2021. |
| "Birthing Addicts" † | 2012 | Melanie Martinez | Published by Gap City Music and Warner-Tamerlane Publishing Corp.; The song was originally released on Martinez' YouTube channel, but has since been taken down.; The studio version was leaked on May 17, 2021. |
| "Bones Are Blue" † | 2014 | Melanie Martinez | Failed to be included on Cry Baby (2015).; The studio version was leaked on May 17, 2021, via SoundCloud.; Written and also debuted (live on the online streaming service, Ustream) on December 4, 2012. |
| "Can't Shake You" † | 2013 | Melanie Martinez; Anya Marina; Larzz Principato | The studio version was leaked on December 29, 2015, via SoundCloud.; Background vocals were recorded by Anya Marina.; The leaked file was recorded from July 23–24, 2013. |
| "Coloring Book" † | 2014 | Melanie Martinez; Jeremy Dussolliet; Tim Sommers | Failed to be included on Cry Baby (2015).; The studio version was leaked on May 10, 2021, via SoundCloud. |
| "Cooties" † | 2014 | Melanie Martinez; Phoebe Ryan; Felix Snow | Failed to be included on Cry Baby (2015).; The studio version was leaked on February 17, 2021.; Recorded in the same session with "Teddy Bear", on May 7, 2014. |
| "Corpse" † | 2021 | Melanie Martinez; Jeremy Dussolliet; Tim Sommers | Failed to be included on Portals (2023).; The demo version was leaked on October 31, 2021 . |
| "Curly Cue" † | 2011 | Melanie Martinez | Published by Gap City Music and Warner-Tamerlane Publishing Corp.; The studio version was leaked on May 17, 2021. |
| "Dear Porcupines" † | 2013 | Melanie Martinez | Published by Gap City Music and Warner-Tamerlane Publishing Corp.; Known alternatively as "Dear Porcupine".; Known alternatively as "Porcupines".; The song was originally released on Martinez' YouTube channel, but has since been taken down.; The studio version was leaked on May 17, 2021. |
| "Eraser" † | 2016 | Melanie Martinez; Jeremy Dussolliet; Tim Sommers | Failed to be included on K–12 (2019).; The studio version was leaked on May 10, 2021. |
| "Emerald" † | 2021 | Melanie Martinez | Failed to be included on Portals (2023).; The studio version was leaked on October 31, 2021 . |
| "Fairy Dance" † | 2021 | Melanie Martinez | Failed to be included on Portals (2023).; The studio version was leaked on November 4, 2021 . |
| "Fingers Crossed" † | 2021 | Melanie Martinez; Jeremy Dussolliet; Tim Sommers | Failed to be included on Portals (2023).; The studio version was leaked on November 15, 2021 . |
| "Garden" † | 2021 | Melanie Martinez; Jeremy Dussolliet; Tim Sommers | Failed to be included on Portals (2023).; The studio version was leaked on October 31, 2021 . |
| "Glue Stick" † | 2016 | Melanie Martinez; Jeremy Dussolliet; Tim Sommers | Failed to be included on K–12 (2019).; The studio version was leaked on May 10, 2021. |
| "Gold Diggin' Love" † | 2013 | Melanie Martinez | Martinez performed this song at Gramercy Theatre in February 2014.; Written in Los Angeles on October 9, 2013. |
| "Gravitate" † | 2021 | Melanie Martinez; Jeremy Dussolliet; Tim Sommers | Failed to be included on Portals (2023).; The studio version was leaked on July 22, 2021 . |
| "Half Hearted" † | 2014 | Melanie Martinez; Miles Nasta | Failed to be included on Cry Baby (2015).; An acoustic worktape/voice memo was leaked on August 11, 2018. |
| "Haunted" † | 2014 | Melanie Martinez; Kara DioGuardi; Christopher Baran | Additionally published by Clandestine Sonics, MXM Music AB, and These Are Songs of Pulse.; Failed to be included on Cry Baby (2015).; The studio version was leaked on September 6, 2018. |
| "Hawaii Space Guitar" † | 2021 | Melanie Martinez; Jeremy Dussolliet; Tim Sommers | Failed to be included on Portals (2023).; The studio version was leaked on November 5, 2021 . |
| "Heart at the Door" | 2013 | Melanie Martinez; Reggie Perry | Published by Gap City Music and Warner-Tamerlane Publishing Corp.; Additionally published by Reginald Perry Music. |
| "History" † | 2017–2019 | Melanie Martinez; Michael Keenan | Failed to be included on After School (2020).; The studio version was leaked on May 16, 2021. |
| "Inconsistent Flame" † | 2021 | Melanie Martinez | Failed to be included on Portals (2023).; The studio version was leaked on May 9, 2022 . |
| "Intervals" † | 2013 | Melanie Martinez | Published by Gap City Music and Warner-Tamerlane Publishing Corp.; There are two known studio sessions. |
| "I Scream" † (feat. Snow Tha Product) | 2015 (Cry Baby demo); 2016 (Reworked version) | Melanie Martinez; Christopher Baran | Failed to be included on Cry Baby (2015).; There are 3 known versions of the song: Demo 1: The original Cry Baby 2015 solo demo. Snippets of it started circulating in September 2020 and was leaked in full on May 16, 2021.; Demo 2: The hook demo, including only Melanie's chorus. This was the demo where the song was re-recorded on May 28, 2016, intending to pitch to other artists. It was leaked on January 4, 2020.; Demo 3: A demo of the song recorded in 2016 too, featuring Snow's Parts which weren't included on previous demos. It was leaked on January 5, 2020. |
| "I Think I'm Crazy" † | 2012 | Melanie Martinez | Published by Gap City Music and Warner-Tamerlane Publishing Corp.; The song was originally released on Martinez' YouTube channel, but has since been made private. |
| "Jinx" † | 2021 | Melanie Martinez | Failed to be included on Portals (2023).; The studio version was leaked on November 15, 2021 . |
| "Jumprope" † | 2014 | Melanie Martinez; Justin Tranter; Nick Monson | Failed to be included on Cry Baby (2015).; The studio version was leaked on May 16, 2021. |
| "Labyrinth" † | 2021 | Melanie Martinez; Jeremy Dussolliet; Tim Sommers | Failed to be included on Portals (2023).; The studio version was leaked on November 16, 2021 . |
| "Last Chapter (Never Stayed for Love)" | 2013 | Melanie Martinez; John Feldmann; Neon Hitch | Published by Gap City Music and Warner-Tamerlane Publishing Corp.; Additionally published on the ASCAP.; Known alternatively as "Stay for Love". |
| "Magnets" † | 2021 | Melanie Martinez; Jeremy Dussolliet; Tim Sommers | Failed to be included on Portals (2023).; The studio version was leaked on July 22, 2021 . |
| "Mistakes" † | 2013 | Melanie Martinez; Daniel Omelio | Failed to be included on Cry Baby (2015).; The studio version was leaked on October 10, 2020.; Known alternatively as "Dressed in Mistakes". |
| "Mother of Pearl " † | 2021 | Melanie Martinez; Jeremy Dussolliet; Tim Sommers | Failed to be included on Portals (2023).; The studio version was leaked on October 31, 2021 . |
| "Needle and Thread" † | 2021 | Melanie Martinez; Jeremy Dussolliet; Tim Sommers | Failed to be included on Portals (2023).; The studio version was leaked on November 5, 2021 . |
| "Night Mime" † | 2013, 2016 | Melanie Martinez; Rick Markowitz | Published by Gap City Music and Warner-Tamerlane Publishing Corp.; Failed to be included on Dollhouse - EP (2014) and Cry Baby (2015).; There are 3 known versions of the song: Demo 1: Made for a scrapped EP from 2013 produced by Doveman. It remains unleaked.; Demo 2: Reworked demo intended for Cry Baby produced by Robopop. It was leaked on May 7, 2021.; Demo 3: Reworked demo intended for pitching to other artists. It does not have a chorus. It leaked on January 25, 2016. |
| "The One" † | 2013 | Melanie Martinez | Published by Gap City Music and Warner-Tamerlane Publishing Corp.; Known alternatively as "One".; The song was originally released on Martinez' YouTube channel, but has since been taken down. |
| "Papercut" † | 2016 | Melanie Martinez; Jeremy Dussolliet; Tim Sommers | Failed to be included on K–12 (2019).; Alternatively titled as "Papercuts".; The studio version was leaked on February 17, 2021. |
| "Psycho Lovers" † | 2013 | Melanie Martinez; Daniel Omelio | Published by Gap City Music and Warner-Tamerlane Publishing Corp.; Additionally published by Robopop Musik.; Failed to be included on Cry Baby (2015). |
| "Puzzles" † | 2021 | Melanie Martinez; Jeremy Dussolliet; Tim Sommers | Failed to be included on Portals (2023).; The studio version was leaked on August 8, 2021 . |
| "Race" † | 2013 | Melanie Martinez | Published by Gap City Music and Warner-Tamerlane Publishing Corp. |
| "Rocking Horse" † | 2014–2015 | Melanie Martinez; Jeremy Dussolliet; Tim Sommers | Failed to be included on Cry Baby (2015).; The studio version was leaked on February 15, 2021.; Contains samples of "All The Places" by Pete Rock & CL Smooth. |
| "Ring Pop" † | 2014 | Melanie Martinez; Jeremy Dussolliet; Tim Sommers | Failed to be included on Cry Baby (2015).; There are 2 known versions of the song: Demo 1: First version of the song. It leaked on April 25, 2021.; Demo 2: Reworked version of the song with new lyrics. It leaked on April 30, 2021. |
| "Rough Love" † | 2014 | Melanie Martinez | Published by Gap City Music and Warner-Tamerlane Publishing Corp.; The studio version was leaked on May 17, 2021. |
| "Run" † | 2013 | Melanie Martinez; Bryan Fryzel | Published by Gap City Music and Warner-Tamerlane Publishing Corp. |
| "Schizo" † | 2014 | Melanie Martinez; Jeremy Dussolliet; Tim Sommers | Published by Gap City Music and Warner-Tamerlane Publishing Corp.; Additionally published by Reginald Perry Music.; Failed to be included on either Cry Baby (2015).; The studio version was leaked on September 16, 2018. |
| "Seesaw" † | 2015 | Melanie Martinez; Jennifer Decilveo | Failed to be included on either Cry Baby (2015).; The studio version was leaked on May 14, 2021. |
| "Smoke" † | 2009 | Melanie Martinez | Published by Gap City Music and Warner-Tamerlane Publishing Corp.; The song was originally released on Martinez' YouTube channel, but has since been taken down.; One of Martinez' oldest known songs. |
| "Strawberry Fields Forever" † | 2014 | John Lennon; Paul McCartney | A song originally by The Beatles that Martinez covered.; Failed to be included on Cry Baby (2015).; The studio version was leaked on September 12, 2018. |
| "Synchronicities" † | 2021 | Melanie Martinez; Jeremy Dussolliet; Tim Sommers | Failed to be included on Portals (2023).; The studio version was leaked on November 4, 2021 . |
| "Time Flies" † | 2013 | Melanie Martinez | Published by Gap City Music and Warner-Tamerlane Publishing Corp.; The studio version was leaked on May 17, 2021. |
| "Trophy Wife" † | 2015 | Melanie Martinez; Michael Keenan | Failed to be included on Cry Baby (2015).; The studio version was leaked on May 17, 2021. |
| "Tunnel Vision" † | 2021 | Melanie Martinez; Jeremy Dussolliet; Tim Sommers | Failed to be included on Portals (2023).; The studio version was leaked on November 4, 2021 .; It was replaced with its repurposed version "Tunnel Vision" (2023) |
| "Twins" † | 2014 | Melanie Martinez; Jeremy Dussolliet; Tim Sommers | Failed to be included on Cry Baby (2015).; The studio version was leaked on April 26, 2021.; Recorded on October 29, 2014. |
| "Unhappy Meal" † | 2014 | Melanie Martinez | A demo was leaked on September 17, 2018. |
| "Walkie Talkie" † | 2021 | Melanie Martinez; Jeremy Dussolliet; Tim Sommers | Failed to be included on Portals (2023).; The studio version was leaked on November 4, 2021. |
| "Where Do Babies Come From?" † | 2014 | Melanie Martinez | Failed to be included on Cry Baby (2015).; The studio version was leaked on October 10, 2020.; Teased by Melanie to her Instagram on July 6, 2014; possibly being the recording date. |
| "Wicked Words" † | 2012 | Jared Dylan | Written by Jared Dylan in December 2012, then sometime in early-mid January 2013, Melanie recorded for a version that would be released February 14, 2013 (along with a visuals "music video").; The song eventually went unreleased after being removed from streaming/public view sometime in either 2013 or 2014. |
| "You Love I" † | 2013–2014 | Melanie Martinez; Jeremy Dussolliet; Tim Sommers | Published by Gap City Music and Warner-Tamerlane Publishing Corp.; Additionally published by Reginald Perry Music.; Failed to be included on Dollhouse - EP (2014) and also Cry Baby (2015). |
| "Zzzz" † | 2014 | Melanie Martinez; Jeremy Dussolliet; Tim Sommers | Failed to be included on Cry Baby (2015).; The third version ("zzzz 03.mp3") was leaked on January 12, 2021.; The first version ("zzzz 01.mp3") was leaked on April 20, 2021.; The second version ("zzzz 02.mp3") was leaked on May 17, 2021. |
