= Melanie Martinez discography =

Recordings by American singer-songwriter

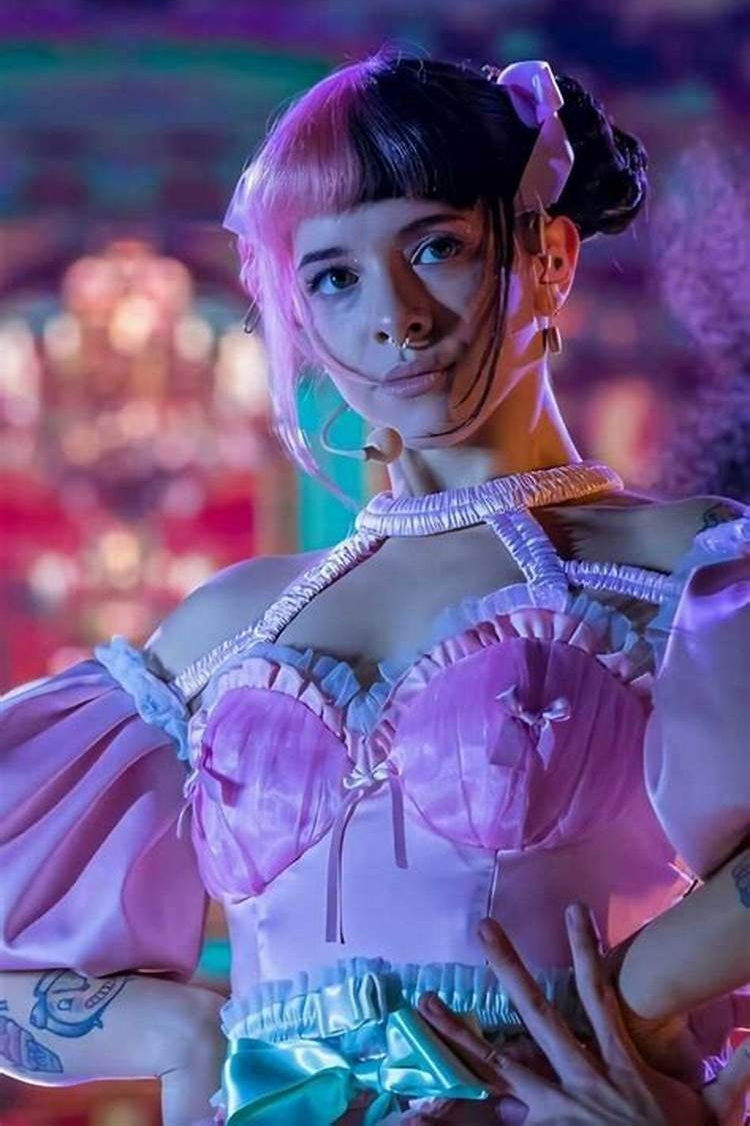
- Melanie Martinez at All Things Go. Washington, DC. (2019)
- Studio albums: 4
- EPs: 4
- Singles: 16
- Promotional singles: 11
- Music videos: 32

American singer-songwriter Melanie Martinez has released four studio albums, four extended plays, sixteen singles, two promotional singles and thirty two music videos. After her long journey on The Voice, Martinez signed a recording contract with Atlantic Records in 2014.

Her debut EP, Dollhouse, was released in the same year and included her two first singles, "Dollhouse" and "Carousel". Her debut album, Cry Baby, was released in 2015. It peaked at number six on the US Billboard 200 and was certified platinum by the RIAA. Three singles, "Pity Party", "Soap", and "Sippy Cup", promoted the album.

Martinez's second studio album, K–12, was released in 2019. It peaked at number three on the Billboard 200 and reached the top ten in Australia, Canada, Ireland, New Zealand, and the United Kingdom. Martinez released the EP After School in September 2020, featuring "The Bakery", its lead single. Her third studio album, Portals was released in 2023. This was followed by her fourth studio album, Hades, released in 2026.

== Studio albums ==
Title	Details	Peak chart positions										Sales	Certifications
Title	Details	US	US Alt.	AUS	CAN	IRE	NLD	NZ	SCO	SPA	UK	Sales	Certifications
Cry Baby	Released: August 14, 2015; Label: Atlantic; Formats: Cassette, CD, digital download, LP, streaming	6	1	27	10	35	65	21	40	6	32	US: 988,000	RIAA: 2× Platinum; BPI: Platinum; FIMI: Gold; MC: Platinum; RMNZ: 2× Platinum
K–12	Released: September 6, 2019; Label: Atlantic; Formats: Cassette, CD, digital download, LP, streaming	3	1	6	10	7	8	8	8	6	8		RIAA: Platinum; BPI: Gold; MC: Platinum; RMNZ: Gold
Portals	Released: March 31, 2023; Label: Atlantic; Formats: Cassette, CD, digital download, LP, streaming	2	1	1	3	3	8	1	3	8	2		BPI: Gold
Hades	Released: March 27, 2026; Label: Atlantic; Formats: Cassette, CD, digital download, LP, streaming	3	1	4	13	8	7	7	2	12	5	US: 84,000	
Elysium	Scheduled: TBA; Label: Atlantic	To be released											

== Extended plays ==
Title	Details	Peak chart positions		
Title	Details	US	AUS	UK
Dollhouse	Released: May 19, 2014; Label: Atlantic; Format: CD, digital download, LP	— (Note: Dollhouse did not enter the Billboard 200, but did peak at number 4 on the Billboard Heatseekers Albums chart.)	—	—
Pity Party	Released: May 6, 2016; Label: Atlantic; Format: Digital download	—	—	—
Cry Baby's Extra Clutter	Released: November 25, 2016; Label: Atlantic; Format: LP	—	—	—
After School	Released: September 25, 2020; Label: Atlantic; Format: CD, digital download, LP	74	63	70
"—" denotes single that did not chart or was not released.

== Singles ==
=== As lead artist ===
Title	Year	Peak chart positions								Certifications	Album
Title	Year	US	US Pop Dig.	US Rock	CAN	IRE	NZ Hot	UK	WW	Certifications	Album
"Dollhouse" (Note: "Dollhouse" is also included in the EP Pity Party EP.)	2014	—	—	—	—	—	—	—	—	RIAA: 2× Platinum; BPI: Gold; MC: Platinum; RMNZ: Gold	Dollhouse and Cry Baby
"Carousel"	2014	—	38	— (Note: "Carosoul" did not enter the Billboard Hot Rock & Alternative Songs, but peaked at number nine on the Billboard Alternative Digital Songs Charts.)	—	—	—	—	—	RIAA: Platinum; BPI: Silver; MC: Gold	Dollhouse and Cry Baby
"Pity Party" (Note: "Pity Party" is also included on the EP Pity Party EP.)	2015	— (Note: "Pity Party" did not enter the Billboard Hot 100, but peaked at number four on the Bubbling Under Hot 100 Singles chart.)	40	— (Note: "Pity Party" did not enter the Billboard Hot Rock & Alternative Songs, but peaked at number 13 on the Billboard Alternative Digital Songs Charts.)	—	—	—	175	—	RIAA: 2× Platinum; BPI: Silver; MC: Platinum; RMNZ: Gold	Cry Baby
"Soap"	2015	—	16	— (Note: "Soap" did not enter the Billboard Hot Rock & Alternative Songs, but peaked at number 12 on the Billboard Alternative Digital Songs Charts.)	—	—	—	—	—	RIAA: Platinum; BPI: Silver; MC: Gold; RMNZ: Gold	Cry Baby
"Sippy Cup"	2015	—	—	— (Note: "Sippy Cup" did not enter the Billboard Hot Rock & Alternative Songs, but peaked at number 18 on the Billboard Alternative Digital Songs Charts.)	—	—	—	—	—	RIAA: Gold; BPI: Silver; RMNZ: Gold	Cry Baby
"Gingerbread Man"	2016	—	—	—	—	—	—	—	—		Cry Baby's Extra Clutter
"Copy Cat" (featuring Tierra Whack)	2020	—	—	—	—	—	—	—	—		Non-album singles
"Fire Drill"	2020	—	—	—	—	—	35	—	—		Non-album singles
"The Bakery" (Note: "The Bakery" is also included on the deluxe edition of K–12.)	2020	—	—	25	—	—	23	—	—		After School
"Death"	2023	95	—	9	—	66	7	67	161		Portals
"Void"	2023	61	—	5	51	51	8	44	87		Portals
"Evil"	2023	— (Note: "Evil" did not enter the Billboard Hot 100, but peaked at number seven on the Bubbling Under Hot 100 chart.)	—	12	—	—	14	—	—		Portals
"Possession"	2026	— (Note: "Possession" did not enter the Billboard Hot 100, but peaked at number one on the Bubbling Under Hot 100 chart.)	—	11	—	—	15	—	—		Hades
"Disney Princess"	2026	—	—	39	—	—	—	—	—		Hades
"Uncanny Valley"	2026	—	—	37	—	—	35	—	—		Hades
"The Vatican"	2026	—	—	—	—	—	—	—	—		Hades
"—" denotes a recording that did not chart or was not released in that territory.

=== Promotional singles ===
Title	Year	Peaks					Album
Title	Year	US	US Alt. Dig.	US Pop Dig.	US Rock	CAN	Album
"Toxic" (The Voice Performance)	2012	—	—	39	—	—	Non-album singles
"Lights" (The Voice Performance)	2012	—	—	39	—	—	Non-album singles
"Bulletproof" (The Voice Performance)	2012	—	—	—	—	—	Non-album singles
"Hit the Road Jack" (The Voice Performance)	2012	—	—	—	—	—	Non-album singles
"Cough Syrup" (The Voice Performance)	2012	—	15	—	— (Note: "Cough Syrup" did not enter the Billboard Hot Rock Songs chart, but reached number 19 on the Rock Digital Songs chart.)	—	Non-album singles
"Seven Nation Army" (The Voice Performance)	2012	86	3	—	10	55	Non-album singles
"Too Close" (The Voice Performance)	2012	94	—	—	11	76	Non-album singles
"Crazy" (The Voice Performance)	2012	— (Note: "Crazy" did not enter the Billboard Hot 100, but reached number 18 on the Bubbling Under Hot 100 extension chart.)	—	30	—	99	Non-album singles
"The Show" (The Voice Performance)	2012	— (Note: "The Show" did not enter the Billboard Hot 100, but reached number 23 on the Heatseekers Songs chart.)	—	35	—	—	Non-album singles
"High School Sweethearts"	2019	—	—	—	—	—	K–12
"Strawberry Shortcake"	2019	—	—	—	—	—	K–12
"—" denotes a recording that did not chart or was not released in that territory.

== Other charted and certified songs ==
Title	Year	Peak chart positions										Certifications	Album
Title	Year	US Bub.	US Rock	AUS	FRA	IRE	NOR	NZ Hot	SWE Heat.	SWI	UK	Certifications	Album
"Cry Baby"	2015	—	—	—	—	—	—	—	—	—	—	RIAA: Gold; BPI: Silver; MC: Gold	Cry Baby
"Alphabet Boy"	2015	24	—	—	—	—	—	—	—	—	—	RIAA: Gold	Cry Baby
"Pacify Her"	2015	15	—	—	—	—	—	—	—	—	—	RIAA: Platinum; BPI: Silver; RMNZ: Gold	Cry Baby
"Mrs. Potato Head"	2015	5	—	—	—	—	—	—	—	—	—	RIAA: Gold; BPI: Silver; MC: Gold; RMNZ: Gold	Cry Baby
"Mad Hatter"	2015	—	—	—	—	—	—	—	—	—	—	RIAA: Platinum; BPI: Silver; MC: Gold; RMNZ: Gold	Cry Baby
"Tag, You're It"	2015	—	—	—	—	—	—	—	—	—	—	RIAA: Gold; BPI: Silver; RMNZ: Gold	Cry Baby
"Milk & Cookies"	2015	—	—	—	—	—	—	—	—	—	—	RIAA: Gold	Cry Baby
"Training Wheels"	2015	—	—	—	—	—	—	—	—	—	—	RIAA: Platinum; BPI: Silver; RMNZ: Gold	Cry Baby
"Cake"	2015	—	—	—	—	—	—	—	—	—	—	RIAA: Gold; BPI: Silver; RMNZ: Gold	Cry Baby (Deluxe Edition)
"Play Date"	2015	—	—	76	138	45	23	—	1	78	78	RIAA: 2× Platinum; BPI: Gold; MC: Gold; RMNZ: Platinum	Cry Baby (Deluxe Edition)
"Teddy Bear"	2015	—	—	—	—	—	—	—	—	—	—	RIAA: Gold	Cry Baby (Deluxe Edition)
"Wheels on the Bus"	2019	—	—	—	—	—	—	24	—	—	—		K–12
"Show & Tell"	2019	14	— (Note: "Show & Tell" did not enter the Hot Rock & Alternative Songs chart, but peaked at number 21 on the Rock Digital Song Sales chart.)	—	—	—	—	21	—	—	—		K–12
"Nurse's Office"	2019	—	—	—	—	—	—	28	—	—	—		K–12
"Lunchbox Friends"	2019	—	—	—	—	—	—	25	—	—	—	MC: Gold	K–12
"Teacher's Pet"	2019	—	—	—	—	—	—	—	—	—	—	RIAA: Gold; BPI: Silver; RMNZ: Gold	K–12
"Tunnel Vision"	2023	9	13	—	—	—	—	16	—	—	—		Portals
"Faerie Soirée"	2023	—	19	—	—	—	—	—	—	—	—		Portals
"Light Shower"	2023	—	18	—	—	—	—	—	—	—	—		Portals
"Spider Web"	2023	—	17	—	—	—	—	—	—	—	—		Portals
"Leeches"	2023	—	28	—	—	—	—	—	—	—	—		Portals
"Battle of the Larynx"	2023	—	20	—	—	—	—	—	—	—	—		Portals
"The Contortionist"	2023	3	10	—	—	—	—	12	—	—	—		Portals
"Moon Cycle"	2023	—	27	—	—	—	—	—	—	—	—		Portals
"Nymphology"	2023	19	15	—	—	—	—	—	—	—	—		Portals
"Womb"	2023	—	30	—	—	—	—	—	—	—	—		Portals
"Milk of the Siren"	2023	—	37	—	—	—	—	—	—	—	—		Portals
"Garbage"	2026	—	38	—	—	—	—	32	—	—	—		Hades
"Is This a Cult?"	2026	—	45	—	—	—	—	37	—	—	—		Hades
"White Boy with a Gun"	2026	—	48	—	—	—	—	—	—	—	—		Hades
"Grudges"	2026	—	42	—	—	—	—	—	—	—	—		Hades
"Monopoly Man"	2026	—	44	—	—	—	—	29	—	—	—		Hades
"—" denotes a recording that did not chart or was not released in that territory.

== Music videos ==
List of music videos, showing year released and directors.
Title	Year	Director(s)	Album	Ref.
"Dollhouse"	2014	Nathan Scialom; Tom McNamara	Dollhouse	
"Carousel"	2014	Adam Donald	Dollhouse	
"Pity Party"	2015	Melanie Martinez	Cry Baby	
"Sippy Cup"	2015	Melanie Martinez	Cry Baby	
"Soap" / "Training Wheels"	2015	Melanie Martinez	Cry Baby	
"Cry Baby"	2016	Melanie Martinez	Cry Baby	
"Alphabet Boy"	2016	Melanie Martinez	Cry Baby	
"Tag, You're It" / "Milk and Cookies"	2016	Melanie Martinez	Cry Baby	
"Pacify Her"	2016	Melanie Martinez	Cry Baby	
"Mrs. Potato Head"	2016	Melanie Martinez	Cry Baby	
"Mad Hatter"	2017	Melanie Martinez	Cry Baby	
"Show & Tell"*	2019	Melanie Martinez	K–12	
"Wheels on the Bus"*	2019	Melanie Martinez	K–12	
"Class Fight"*	2019	Melanie Martinez	K–12	
"The Principal"*	2019	Melanie Martinez	K–12	
"Nurse's Office"*	2019	Melanie Martinez	K–12	
"Drama Club"*	2019	Melanie Martinez	K–12	
"Strawberry Shortcake"*	2019	Melanie Martinez	K–12	
"Lunchbox Friends"*	2020	Melanie Martinez	K–12	
"Orange Juice"*	2020	Melanie Martinez	K–12	
"Detention"*	2020	Melanie Martinez	K–12	
"Teacher's Pet"*	2020	Melanie Martinez	K–12	
"High School Sweethearts"*	2020	Melanie Martinez	K–12	
"Recess"*	2020	Melanie Martinez	K–12	
"The Bakery"	2020	Melanie Martinez	After School	
"Death"	2023	Melanie Martinez	Portals	
"Void"	2023	Melanie Martinez	Portals	
"Tunnel Vision"	2023	Melanie Martinez	Portals	
"Faerie Soirée"	2024	Melanie Martinez	Portals	
"Light Shower"	2024	Melanie Martinez	Portals	
"Spider Web"	2024	Melanie Martinez	Portals	
"Leeches"	2025	Melanie Martinez	Portals	
"*" denotes that the music video was originally featured in the K–12 film.
