= The Trilogy Tour (Melanie Martinez) =

2024 concert tour by Melanie Martinez

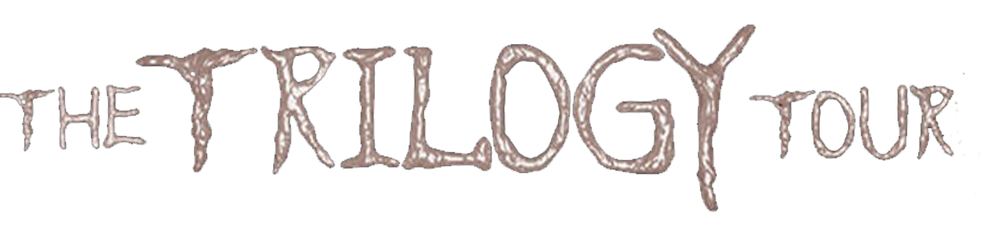
- Tour by Melanie Martinez
- Location: North America; Europe
- Associated albums: Cry Baby; K-12; Portals
- Start date: May 10, 2024
- End date: November 16, 2024
- Legs: 3
- No. of shows: 33 in North America; 19 in Europe; 1 in Latin America; 53 in total
- Supporting acts: Men I Trust; Elita; Beach Bunny; Sofia Isella; Lola Young
- Attendance: 374,610 (27 shows)
- Box office: $38,433,050 (27 shows)
- Website: https://www.melaniemartinezmusic.com/tour

Melanie Martinez concert chronology
- Portals Tour (2023–2024); The Trilogy Tour (2024); Hades: The Sacrifice (2026)

The Trilogy Tour was the fifth concert tour and first all-arena tour by American singer-songwriter Melanie Martinez, launched in support of her (Note: Martinez uses she/her and they/them pronouns. This article uses she/her pronouns for consistency.) first three studio albums, Cry Baby, K-12 and Portals. Comprising fifty-three shows, the tour started on May 10, 2024, at the Climate Pledge Arena in Seattle, Washington, and concluded on November 16, 2024, at the Corona Capital festival in Mexico City, Mexico. Men I Trust, Beach Bunny, Sofia Isella, Elita, and Lola Young served as opening acts.

== Background ==
On November 9, 2023, Martinez announced twenty-one dates across North America, near the conclusion of her The Portals Tour. Presale began on November 14, 2023 with the general sale going on sale on three days later. On November 17, 2023, Martinez announced the addition of seven new shows to the tour, including a second show at Madison Square Garden in her home of New York City, due to "overwhelming demand" according to the official mailing list. On March 21, 2024, Martinez announced nineteen European, with a presale on March 25, 2024, and a general sale on March 28.

== Critical reception ==
The tour was met with critical acclaim for the production, visuals, costumes and the general development of the entire tour.

Ali Choudhary of The Courier commended the singer saying that she "truly delivered a theatrical and delicious spectacle—not only with her expressional and gorgeous outfits designed by Pipenco Lorena and transforming hairstyles by William Scott Blair—but by presenting a surreal performance packed with effortless vocals which were nothing short of what you’d expect from an utterly phenomenal artist."

Corey Ware of Breathe Pop magazine described the tour as "The nearly three-hour show, was as close to a Broadway production as it was to a pop tour."

Kat Sophia, from the Santa Barbara Independent at Melanie's show in Inglewood said: "Alt-Pop Star Chronicles Each Album of Her Discography in Nostalgia-Filled, Whimsical, Daring Show at Kia Forum"

Ed Mazley, from the AZCentral said: "The Trilogy Tour is an elaborate theatrical extravaganza as conceptually audacious as we'll likely see a major pop star manage in a massive sports arena until Melanie Martinez somehow figures out a way to top herself."

Jordi Bardají, from the Jenesai: pop "The show is an abundance of rarely seen costumes, makeup and sets. And what's rare is that not many pop artists commit so deeply to a childlike aesthetic, and then a teenager, to end up becoming a monster with four eyes and malformed ears, also telling the story of a life, of a girl who becomes an adult in the worst way"

== Commercial performance ==
The Trilogy Tour was a commercial success, marking Martinez's transition from theater shows to large venues. After the initial tour announcement, tickets in more than twenty cities were completely sold out and reaching maximum capacity in these spaces within a few weeks. Due to high demand, six more dates were added to the tour with an additional performance at Madison Square Garden. Martinez's performances at the arena received an attendance of 28,903, becoming one of the only alternative female artists to have sold out Madison Square Garden more than once in a row. The North American leg grossed more than $38 million across twenty-seven shows, in addition to selling more than 300,000 tickets within the approximately two-month period.

During the European leg of the tour, Martinez performed the biggest show of her career with a sold-out attendance of over 22,000 at the Co-op Live in Manchester. On October 3, 2024, the singer was honored in the United Kingdom for having sold more than 50,000 tickets in four completely sold-out shows.

== Set list ==
The following setlist is obtained from the concert at the Climate Pledge Arena in Seattle on May 10, 2024. It is not intended to represent all dates throughout the tour.

Act I: Cry Baby

1. "Cry Baby"
2. "Dollhouse"
3. "Sippy Cup"
4. "Carousel"
5. "Alphabet Boy" (not performed in festival dates)
6. "Soap"
7. "Happy Birthday to You"
8. "Pity Party"
9. "Play Date"
10. "Mad Hatter"

Act II: K–12

10. "Wheels on the Bus"
11. "Class Fight" (not performed in festival dates)
12. "The Principal" (Video Interlude)
13. "Show & Tell"
14. "Nurse's Office"
15. "Strawberry Shortcake" (not performed in festival dates)
16. "Lunchbox Friends" (not performed in festival dates)
17. "Teacher's Pet"
18. "High School Sweethearts"

Act III: Portals

19. "Death"
20. "Void"
21. "Tunnel Vision"
22. "Faerie Soirée"
23. "Light Shower" (not performed in festival dates)
24. "Spider Web"
25. "Battle of the Larynx" (not performed in festival dates)
26. "The Contortionist" (not performed in festival dates)
27. "Nymphology"
28. "Evil"
29. "Womb"

Encore

1. "Angels Song"

== Tour dates ==
List of concerts, showing date, city, country, venue, opening acts, attendance and revenue
Date (2024)	City	Country	Venue	Opening act(s)	Attendance	Revenue
May 10	Seattle	United States	Climate Pledge Arena	Men I Trust; Beach Bunny	15,091 / 15,091	$1,628,106
May 12	Oakland	United States	Oakland Arena	Men I Trust; Beach Bunny	14,746 / 14,746	$1,474,779
May 14	Thousand Palms (Note: Labeled as Palm Springs in promotional material.)	United States	Acrisure Arena	Men I Trust; Beach Bunny	9,236 / 9,236	$1,111,170
May 15	Inglewood	United States	Kia Forum	Men I Trust; Beach Bunny	14,779 / 14,779	$1,633,856
May 17	Paradise (Note: Labeled as Las Vegas in promotional material.)	United States	MGM Grand Garden Arena	Men I Trust; Beach Bunny	12,465 / 12,465	$1,086,207
May 18	Salt Lake City	United States	Delta Center	Men I Trust; Beach Bunny	11,735 / 11,735	$1,146,528
May 20 (Note: Originally scheduled for May 21, but was rescheduled to avoid conflicting with the NBA playoffs.)	Denver	United States	Ball Arena	Men I Trust; Beach Bunny	13,706 / 13,706	$1,277,240
May 22 (Note: Originally scheduled for May 25, but was rescheduled to avoid conflicting with the NBA playoffs.)	Dallas	United States	American Airlines Center	Men I Trust; Beach Bunny	13,170 / 13,170	$1,501,761
May 23	Houston	United States	Toyota Center	Men I Trust; Beach Bunny	12,715 / 12,715	$1,270,422
May 24	Austin	United States	Moody Center	Men I Trust; Beach Bunny	12,196 / 12,196	$1,260,812
May 28	Duluth	United States	Gas South Arena	Beach Bunny; Sofia Isella	11,075 / 11,075	$1,152,787
May 29	Orlando	United States	Kia Center	Beach Bunny; Sofia Isella	13,480 / 13,480	$1,340,815
May 31	Raleigh	United States	PNC Arena	Beach Bunny; Sofia Isella	14,389 / 14,389	$1,449,768
June 1	Baltimore	United States	CFG Bank Arena	Beach Bunny; Sofia Isella	12,341 / 12,341	$1,147,966
June 3	Philadelphia	United States	Wells Fargo Center	Beach Bunny; Sofia Isella	14,763 / 14,763	$1,605,466
June 5	New York City	United States	Madison Square Garden	Beach Bunny; Sofia Isella	28,903 / 28,903	$3,519,532
June 6	New York City	United States	Madison Square Garden	Beach Bunny; Sofia Isella	28,903 / 28,903	$3,519,532
June 7	Boston	United States	TD Garden	Beach Bunny; Sofia Isella	13,897 / 13,897	$1,334,171
June 9	Toronto	Canada	Scotiabank Arena	Beach Bunny; Sofia Isella	15,070 / 15,070	$1,370,990
June 11	Minneapolis	United States	Target Center	Beach Bunny; Sofia Isella	13,554 / 13,554	$1,244,958
June 13	Columbus	United States	Nationwide Arena	Beach Bunny; Sofia Isella	14,830 / 14,830	$1,538,285
June 14	Detroit	United States	Little Caesars Arena	Beach Bunny; Sofia Isella	14,731 / 14,731	$1,500,696
June 15 (Note: This concert is part of Bonnaroo Music Festival.)	Manchester	United States	Great Stage Park	—N/a	—N/a	—N/a
June 18	Tampa	United States	Amalie Arena	Beach Bunny; Sofia Isella	13,695 / 13,695	$1,346,131
June 19	Sunrise	United States	Amerant Bank Arena	Beach Bunny; Sofia Isella	12,278 / 12,278	$1,228,604
June 22	Fort Worth	United States	Dickies Arena	Beach Bunny; Sofia Isella	12,332 / 12,332	$1,196,535
June 23	San Antonio	United States	Frost Bank Center	Beach Bunny; Sofia Isella	13,940 / 13,940	$1,298,800
June 25	Phoenix	United States	Footprint Center	Beach Bunny; Sofia Isella	12,470 / 12,470	$1,392,921
June 27	Anaheim	United States	Honda Center	Beach Bunny; Sofia Isella	13,023 / 13,023	$1,373,744
July 31	Hershey	United States	Giant Center	Lola Young	—	—
August 2 (Note: This concert is part of Osheaga Festival.)	Montreal	Canada	Parc Jean-Drapeau	—N/a	—N/a	—N/a
August 4 (Note: This concert is part of Lollapalooza.)	Chicago	United States	Grant Park	—N/a	—N/a	—N/a
September 18	Dublin	Ireland	3Arena	Elita	—	—
September 20	Birmingham	England	Utilita Arena	Elita	—	—
September 21	Manchester	England	Co-op Live	Elita	—	—
September 23	Glasgow	Scotland	OVO Hydro	Elita	—	—
September 24	Cardiff	Wales	Utilita Arena Cardiff	Elita	—	—
September 26	London	England	The O_{2} Arena	Men I Trust; Elita	—	—
September 29	Brussels	Belgium	Forest National	Men I Trust; Elita	—	—
October 1	Amsterdam	Netherlands	Ziggo Dome	Men I Trust; Elita	—	—
October 2	Paris	France	Accor Arena	Men I Trust; Elita	—	—
October 4	Décines-Charpieu (Note: Labeled as Lyon in promotional material.)	France	LDLC Arena	Men I Trust; Elita	—	—
October 5	Barcelona	Spain	Palau Sant Jordi	Men I Trust; Elita	—	—
October 7	Madrid	Spain	WiZink Center	Men I Trust; Elita	—	—
October 10	Cologne	Germany	Lanxess Arena	Men I Trust; Elita	—	—
October 11	Frankfurt	Germany	Festhalle Frankfurt	Men I Trust; Elita	—	—
October 12	Hamburg	Germany	Barclays Arena	Men I Trust; Elita	10,000 / 16,000 (62.5%)	—
October 15	Łódź	Poland	Atlas Arena	Men I Trust; Elita	—	—
October 16	Prague	Czech Republic	O_{2} Arena	Men I Trust; Elita	—	—
October 18	Casalecchio di Reno (Note: Labelled as Bologna in promotional material.)	Italy	Unipol Arena	Men I Trust; Elita	—	—
October 19	Assago (Note: Labeled as Milan in promotional material.)	Italy	Unipol Forum	Men I Trust; Elita	—	—
November 16 (Note: This concert is part of Corona Capital.)	Mexico City	Mexico	Autódromo Hermanos Rodríguez	—N/a	—N/a	—N/a
Total					384,610 / 390,610 (98.46%)	$38,433,050

== Co-performers ==
=== Openers ===
- Elita Harkov
- Beach Bunny
- Lola Young
- Sofia Isella
- Men I Trust

=== Dancers ===
- Nico Lonetree
- Angel Mammoliti
- Brandon Mathis
- Jas Lin
- Andrea Bess
- Shannon Kelly
- Macy Swaim
- Shauna Davis
- Mario Harris
- Daisy DeMack

=== Band ===
- Harry Foster
- AI Cleveland III
- Chad Hasty
- Alia Mohamed
- Layne

== Notes ==
Show details
