= One Love (music producer) =

American record producer

- Born: Timothy Paul Sommers
- Origin: Rockville, Maryland, United States
- Instruments: Drums; piano; synthesizer
- Years active: 2009–present
- Label: Warner/Chappell

Tim Sommers, known professionally as One Love, is an American record producer, songwriter, and multi-instrumentalist. His professional career began after cowriting the Grammy-nominated "Airplanes" with long-time collaborator Kinetics while attending Cornell University. He has written and produced songs for Madison Beer, Melanie Martinez, Fletcher, Pitbull, Tate McRae, Jennifer Lopez, Lil Wayne, Hailee Steinfeld, Anthony Ramos, Lonely Island and more.

== Discography ==
Year	Artist	Song	Album	Credit
2026	Nickelback	Last Night Was Fun	Everything Under The Sun	Producer, writer
2026	Madison Beer	bittersweet	locket	Producer, writer
2026	Madison Beer	angel wings	locket	Producer, writer
2026	Madison Beer	free	locket (deluxe)	Producer, writer
2026	Dustin Lynch	Clean Slate	Clean Slate	Producer, writer
2026	ZEROBASEONE	Top 5	Single	Producer, writer
2026	lovelytheband	miss me	we're all feeling the same	Producer, writer
2026	Breland	In My Truck	Single	Producer, writer
2026	Zia Victoria	free spirit	Single	Producer, writer
2026	Dana Salah	Samurai (ft King Deco)	Bent Bladna	Producer, writer
2026	Airplane Man	Gloria Euphoria	Gloria Euphoria	Producer, writer, mixer
2025	NCT Dream	Beat It Up	Beat It Up	Producer, writer
2025	Wonho	If You Wanna	Syndrome	Producer, writer
2025	Wonho	Beautiful	Syndrome	Producer, writer
2025	Madison Beer	bittersweet	Single	Producer, writer
2025	Inigo Quintero	El Pacto	El Sitio de Siempre	Writer
2025	Airplane Man	The Ceiling	Single	Producer, writer, mixer
2025	Airplane Man	Kickstand	Single	Producer, writer, mixer
2025	Airplane Man	You Were The Sea	Single	Producer, writer, mixer
2025	Airplane Man	Motorbike	Single	Producer, writer, mixer
2025	Ellee Duke	Copium	Single	Producer, writer
2025	Anna Shoemaker	Iced Coffee	Someone Should Stop Her	Writer
2025	Frawley	I Broke My Heart For The Plot	Single	Producer, writer
2024	David Kushner	Humankind	The Dichotomy	Producer, writer
2024	Fletcher	Doing Better	In Search Of The Antidote	Producer, writer
2024	Fletcher	Eras Of Us	In Search Of The Antidote	Producer, writer
2024	Fletcher	Crush	In Search Of The Antidote	Producer, writer
2024	Fletcher	Joyride	In Search Of The Antidote	Producer, writer
2024	Alexa Cappelli	Replicate You	The Process Of Elimination	Producer, writer
2023	Madison Beer	Spinnin	Silence Between Songs	Producer, writer
2023	Madison Beer	Sweet Relief	Silence Between Songs	Producer, writer
2023	Madison Beer	Envy The Leaves	Silence Between Songs	Producer, writer
2023	Madison Beer	17	Silence Between Songs	Additional Production
2023	Madison Beer	Ryder	Silence Between Songs	Producer, writer
2023	Madison Beer	At Your Worst	Silence Between Songs	Producer, writer
2023	Madison Beer	Showed Me (How I Fell In Love With You)	Silence Between Songs	Producer, writer
2023	Madison Beer	Home To Another One	Silence Between Songs	Producer, writer
2023	Madison Beer	Dangerous	Silence Between Songs	Producer, writer
2023	Madison Beer	Reckless	Silence Between Songs	Producer, writer
2023	Madison Beer	Silence Between Songs	Silence Between Songs	Producer, writer
2023	Madison Beer	King Of Everything	Silence Between Songs	Producer, writer
2023	Madison Beer	Home To Another One (Timbaland Remix)	Single	Writer
2023	Melanie Martinez	TUNNEL VISION	Portals	Producer, writer
2023	Melanie Martinez	MILK OF THE SIREN	Portals	Producer, writer
2023	Fletcher	Eras Of Us	Eras Of Us - Single	Producer, writer
2023	Fletcher	Better Version (Remix ft. Kelsea Ballerini)	Girl Of My Dreams	Producer, writer
2023	lovelytheband	Nice To Know You	Nice To Know You - Single	Producer, writer
2023	lovelytheband	Hell Of A Week	if we're being honest	Producer, writer
2023	lovelytheband	2 Drinks Away	if we're being honest	Producer, writer
2023	lovelytheband	I Can't Love	if we're being honest	Producer, writer
2023	lovelytheband	If We're Being Honest	if we're being honest	Producer, writer
2023	Leah Kate	Unbreakup	Super Over	Producer, writer
2023	Kiiara	Speed	Single	Producer, writer
2023	girlfriends	Thanks Anyway	Over My Dead Body	Producer, writer
2023	44phantom	Ugly	Ugly - Single	Producer, writer
2023	NIIKO X SWAE	Parallel Universes (Feat. Frawley)	Parallel Universes - Single	Writer
2023	Rachel Grae	How Dare You	How Dare You - Single	Producer, writer
2022	Madison Beer	Showed Me (How I Fell In Love With You)	Silence Between Songs	Producer, writer
2022	Madison Beer	Dangerous	Silence Between Songs	Producer, writer
2022	Fletcher	Better Version	Girl Of My Dreams	Producer, writer
2022	Fletcher	Becky's So Hot	Girl Of My Dreams	Producer, writer
2022	Fletcher	Guess We Lied	Girl Of My Dreams	Writer
2022	Morgan Evans	Over for You	Over For You - Single	Producer, writer
2022	Morgan Evans	Over For You (Live In Melbourne)	Over For You - Single	Writer
2022	Bryce Vine	y can't we b friends?	y can't we b friends? - Single	Producer, writer
2022	Bryce Vine	American Dream	American Dream - Single	Producer, writer
2022	Frawley	Kiss And Tell	Kiss And Tell - Single	Producer, writer
2022	Dyllon Burnside	Superpowers	Superpowers - Single	Producer, writer
2021	Madison Beer	Reckless	Silence Between Songs	Producer, writer
2021	Anthony Ramos	Blessings	Love and Lies	Producer, writer
2021	Anthony Ramos	Control	Love and Lies	Producer, writer
2021	Anthony Ramos	Pray For Me	Love and Lies	Producer, writer
2021	Madison Beer	Good in Goodbye	Life Support	Producer, writer
2021	Madison Beer	Stay Numb and Carry On	Life Support	Producer, writer
2021	Madison Beer	Homesick	Life Support	Producer, writer
2021	Madison Beer	Selfish	Life Support	Writer
2021	Madison Beer	Sour Times	Life Support	Producer, writer
2021	Madison Beer	Baby	Life Support	Producer, writer
2021	Madison Beer	Stained Glass	Life Support	Producer, writer
2021	Madison Beer	Channel Surfing / The End	Life Support	Writer
2021	Stevie Mackey	Hung Up On You (feat. JoJo)	The Most Wonderful Time	Writer
2021	Olivia Noelle	Feel This Way Tomorrow	Feel This Way Tomorrow - Single	Producer, writer
2021	Airplane Man	Mirror Fight	Mirror Fight — Single	Producer, writer, mixer
2021	Airplane Man	Mirror Fight - Stripped	Mirror Fight — Single	Producer, writer, mixer
2021	Dylan Owen	Hurt Enough (feat. Kinetics)	Hurt Enough - Single	Producer, writer, mixer
2020	Jennifer Lopez	In the Morning	In the Morning — Single	Writer
2020	Lil Wayne	Dreams	Funeral	Producer, writer
2020	Adam Lambert	Velvet	Velvet	Producer, writer
2020	FLETCHER	Forever	Forever – Single	Producer, writer
2020	FLETCHER	Last Laugh	Promising Young Woman Official Soundtrack	Producer, writer
2020	FLETCHER	Forever (Stripped)	Forever (Stripped) – Single	Producer, writer
2020	New Hope Club	Why Oh Why	New Hope Club	Writer
2020	JRM	America	America – Single	Writer
2020	Frawley	Knocking On My Heart	Knocking On My Heart – Single	Writer
2020	Frawley	Knocking On My Heart (Still)	Knocking On My Heart (Still) - Single	Producer, writer
2020	Sophie Beem	Petty	Petty – Single	Producer, writer
2020	IV Jay	On My Way (feat. Jeven Reliford)	Still Home For The Holidays (An R&B Christmas Album)	Producer, writer
2020	Broken Back	Good Days (feat. Dany Synthé)	Good Days	Producer, writer
2019	Madison Beer	Dear Society	Dear Society – Single	Producer, writer
2019	Melanie Martinez	Drama Club	K-12	Producer, writer
2019	Tate McRae	Stupid	All the Things I Never Said	Writer
2019	FLETCHER	Undrunk	You Ruined New York City for Me	Writer
2019	FLETCHER	If You're Gonna Lie	You Ruined New York City for Me	Writer
2019	Anthony Ramos	Come Back Home	The Good & The Bad	Producer, writer
2019	Frawley	Easy	Easy – Single	Producer, writer
2019	Frawley	Ain't Nobody's Baby	Ain't Nobody's – Single	Producer, writer
2019	Frawley	Hard Boy	Hard Boy – Single	Producer, writer
2019	Frawley	Losers	Losers – Single	Producer, writer
2019	Matoma	Not Coming Home (feat. JRM)	One in a Million	Producer, writer
2019	Matoma	When You Leave (feat. Nikki Vianna)	When You Leave - Single	Writer
2019	Confetti	Dear God	Dear God – Single	Producer, writer
2019	Airplane Man	Borderline	Borderline – Single	Producer, writer, mixer
2019	BOYFRIENDZ, Lil Lotus, Smrtdeath, lil aaron	BE AROUND	BFZ2	Producer, Writer
2018	West Coast Massive & Brayton Bowman	High & Low	High & Low – Single	Writer
2018	Quinn XCII	Sad Still	From Michigan With Love	Producer, writer
2018	Jacob Sartorious	Said No One Ever	Better With You	Producer, writer
2018	ABIR	Tango	MINT	Producer, writer
2018	Madison Beer	Fools	As She Pleases	Producer, writer
2018	Madison Beer	Teenager in Love	As She Pleases	Producer, writer
2018	Madison Beer	Tyler Durden	As She Pleases	Producer, writer
2018	Airplane Man	Focus	Focus – Single	Producer, writer, mixer
2018	Airplane Man	Brain Damage	Brain Damage – Single	Producer, writer, mixer
2018	Airplane Man	Keep Movin	Keep Movin – Single	Producer, writer, mixer
2018	Tritonal	Out My Mind (feat. Riley Clemmons)	U & Me	Writer
2018	EZI	SoBer With YoU	AFRAID OF THE DARK EP	Writer
2017	Airplane Man	New Supplier	New Supplier – Single	Producer, writer, mixer
2017	Marc E. Bassy	Plot Twist (feat. KYLE)	Gossip Columns	Producer, writer
2017	Marc E. Bassy	Plot Twist (Remix) [feat. Hailee Steinfeld]	Gossip Columns	Producer, writer
2017	Hailee Steinfeld	Most Girls	Most Girls – Single	Producer, writer
2017	Jacob Sartorious	No Music	Left Me Hangin'	Producer, writer
2017	Accent	Paper Game (Remix) [feat. Kinetics & One Love]	The Last Lyricist EP	Producer, writer, mixer
2017	Grace VanderWaal	Sick of Being Told	Just the Beginning	Producer, writer
2016	Airplane Man	We're on Fire	We're on Fire – Single	Producer, writer, mixer
2016	Airplane Man	Take Me All the Way Home	Take Me All the Way Home – Single	Producer, writer, mixer
2016	Airplane Man	Reign	Reign – Single	Producer, writer, mixer
2016	The Lonely Island	Incredible Thoughts (feat. Michael Bolton and Justin Timberlake)	Popstar: Never Stop Never Stopping	Producer, writer
2016	Sophie Beem	Nail Polish	Sophie Beem EP	Producer, writer
2016	Sophie Beem	Skyline	Sophie Beem EP	Producer, writer
2016	King Deco	Read My Lips	Read My Lips – Single	Producer, writer
2016	Inas X	Love Is (Remix) [feat. Monty]	Love Is – Single	Producer, writer
2016	Inas X	Gets Me High	Gets Me High – Single	Producer, writer
2016	Jena Rose	Paper Walls	Paper Walls – Single	Producer, writer
2016	Diana Espir	When the Love Hits	When the Love Hits – Single	Producer, writer
2015	Melanie Martinez	Cry Baby	Cry Baby	Producer, writer
2015	Melanie Martinez	Dollhouse	Cry Baby	Producer, writer, mixer
2015	Melanie Martinez	Sippy Cup	Cry Baby	Producer, writer
2015	Melanie Martinez	Carousel	Cry Baby	Producer, writer, mixer
2015	Melanie Martinez	Alphabet Boy	Cry Baby	Producer, writer
2015	Melanie Martinez	Mrs. Potato Head	Cry Baby	Producer, writer
2015	Christina Grimmie	Cliche	Cliche – Single	Producer, writer
2015	Katy Tiz	Whistle (While You Work It)	Whistle (While You Work It) – Single	Writer
2015	Katy Tiz	Jus' Whistle (While You Work It) [feat. Shaggy & Inner Circle)	Whistle (While You Work It) – Single	Writer
2015	Clairity	Sharks In The Swimming Pool	Sharks In The Swimming Pool – Single	Producer, writer
2015	Clairity	Velcro	Alienation	Producer, writer
2015	Lenka	Hearts Brighter	The Bright Side	Producer
2015	Jasmine Thompson	Do It Now	Adore	Producer, writer
2014	Men In My Head	Century Love (feat. 50 Cent)	Century Love – Single	Producer, writer
2014	Melanie Martinez	Dead To Me	Dollhouse EP	Producer, writer, mixer
2014	Neon Hitch	Yard Sale	Yard Sale – Single	Producer, writer
2014	Neon Hitch	Intro	301 to Paradise Mixtape	Producer, writer
2014	Neon Hitch	Gypsy Star	301 to Paradise Mixtape	Producer, writer
2014	Neon Hitch	Red Lights	301 to Paradise Mixtape	Producer, writer
2014	Neon Hitch	We Can't Stop (Miley Cyrus Cover)	301 to Paradise Mixtape	Producer, writer
2014	Neon Hitch	Some Like It Hot (feat. Kinetics)	301 to Paradise Mixtape	Producer, writer
2014	Neon Hitch	Subtitles (feat. Kinetics)	301 to Paradise Mixtape	Producer, writer
2014	Neon Hitch	Warner Blvd	Single	Producer, writer, mixer
2014	Kinetics & One Love	Time Machine (feat. Neon Hitch)	Time Machine – Single	Producer, writer, mixer
2014	King Deco	Ocean	Tigris EP	Producer, writer, mixer
2014	iSH	Happy When It's Gone	Up & Up	Producer, writer
2014	Jordan JAE	Said No One Ever	Said No One Ever – Single	Producer, writer, mixer
2014	Totem	Believe In Us (feat. Kinetics & One Love)	Believe In Us – Single	Producer, writer, mixer
2014	Melanie Martinez	Dollhouse (One Love Remix)	Dollhouse (The Remixes)	Producer, writer, mixer
2014	Pitbull	This Is Not A Drill (feat. Bebe Rexha)	Globalization	Producer, writer
2013	Jamie Drastik	Chasing Shadows (feat. Pitbull & Havana Brown)	Chasing Shadows – Single	Writer
2013	Hook N Sling & Chris Willis	Magnet	Magnet – Single	Writer
2013	Dimitri Vegas & Like Mike	Find Tomorrow (Ocarina) [feat. Wolfpack & Katy B]	Find Tomorrow – Single	Writer
2013	Mike Stud	Bad Habits (feat. Kinetics)	Relief	Producer, writer, mixer
2013	Matt Beilis	Silence Says	Silence Says – Single	Producer, writer
2013	Radical Something	Ghost Town (feat. Outasight & Kinetics)	Ghost Town – Single	Writer
2012	Meital Dohan	On Ya (feat. Sean Kingston)	On Ya EP	Writer
2012	Kinetics	Rain Outside (feat. R.A. The Rugged Man & Remedy)	With A Little Help From My Friends	Producer, writer, mixer
2012	Kinetics	Rich Man (feat. Unknown Prophets)	With A Little Help From My Friends	Producer, writer, mixer
2012	Kinetics	Any Means Necessary (feat. Nitty Scott)	With A Little Help From My Friends	Producer, writer, mixer
2012	Kinetics	Would You Follow Me (feat. Deuce Broadway)	With A Little Help From My Friends	Producer, writer, mixer
2012	Kinetics	Music Speak (feat. B. Love & Hunter Stout)	With A Little Help From My Friends	Producer, writer, mixer
2012	Kinetics & One Love	I Am A Computer	You Are Not Alone	Producer, writer, mixer
2012	Kinetics & One Love	Hideous (feat. Mimoza)	You Are Not Alone	Producer, writer, mixer
2012	Kinetics & One Love	You Could Save Us All	You Are Not Alone	Producer, writer, mixer
2012	Kinetics & One Love	Still Dreamin' (feat. Termanology)	You Are Not Alone	Producer, writer, mixer
2012	Kinetics & One Love	Sign Language (feat. Wynter Gordon)	You Are Not Alone	Producer, writer, mixer
2012	Kinetics & One Love	Strangers (feat. Nitty Scott)	You Are Not Alone	Producer, writer, mixer
2012	Kinetics & One Love	In My Own World (feat. Yung Joey)	You Are Not Alone	Producer, writer, mixer
2012	Kinetics & One Love	Sometimes I Feel Like A Robot	You Are Not Alone	Producer, writer, mixer
2012	Kinetics & One Love	From Gorillas To Cyborgs	You Are Not Alone	Producer, writer, mixer
2012	Kinetics & One Love	Vecino Del Mar (feat. KGB)	You Are Not Alone	Producer, writer, mixer
2012	Kinetics & One Love	This Too Shall Pass (feat. Accent & Polina Goudieva)	You Are Not Alone	Producer, writer, mixer
2012	Kinetics & One Love	Will You Be Remembered? (Remix) [feat. KTSB, B. Love & Hunter Stout)	You Are Not Alone	Producer, writer, mixer
2012	Mike Stud	Youth	Youth – Single	Producer, writer, mixer
2011	Kinetics	What Model Are You?	What Model Are You?	Producer, writer, mixer
2011	Kinetics	Be Easy (Remix) [feat. Radical Something]	What Model Are You?	Producer, writer, mixer
2011	Kinetics	Butterfly Effect	What Model Are You?	Producer, writer, mixer
2011	Kinetics	Halley's Comet	What Model Are You?	Producer, writer, mixer
2011	Kinetics	The Joker (feat. Chris Webby)	What Model Are You?	Producer, writer, mixer
2011	Kinetics	Day In The Life (feat. Daniel Feldman)	What Model Are You?	Producer, writer, mixer
2011	Kinetics & One Love	Halley's Comet 2.0	Halley's Comet 2.0 – Single	Producer, writer
2011	Mike Stud	Bottle It Up (feat. Kinetics & One Love)	Bottle It Up – Single	Writer, mixer
2010	B.o.B	Airplanes (feat. Hayley Williams of Paramore)	B.o.B Presents: The Adventures of Bobby Ray	Writer
2010	B.o.B	Airplanes, Pt. II (feat. Eminem & Hayley Williams of Paramore)	B.o.B Presents: The Adventures of Bobby Ray	Writer
2010	Kinetics & One Love	Graduation Song (feat. Wynter Gordon)	Graduation Song – Single	Producer, writer, mixer
2009	Kinetics & One Love	The New Colossus	Fading Back To Normal	Producer, writer, mixer
2009	Kinetics & One Love	Fading... (feat. Christine Dominguez)	Fading Back To Normal	Producer, writer, mixer
2009	Kinetics & One Love	Airplanes	Fading Back To Normal	Producer, writer, mixer
2009	Kinetics & One Love	Hemlock	Fading Back To Normal	Producer, writer, mixer
2009	Kinetics & One Love	Lampin'	Fading Back To Normal	Producer, writer, mixer
2009	Kinetics & One Love	The High Line	Fading Back To Normal	Producer, writer, mixer
2009	Kinetics & One Love	When The Buzz Disappears	Fading Back To Normal	Producer, writer, mixer
2009	Kinetics & One Love	Jewels	Fading Back To Normal	Producer, writer, mixer
2009	Kinetics & One Love	Dazed and Confused	Fading Back To Normal	Producer, writer, mixer
2009	Kinetics & One Love	Fully Focused	Fading Back To Normal	Producer, writer, mixer
2009	Kinetics & One Love	Fingers and Toes	Fading Back To Normal	Producer, writer, mixer
2009	Kinetics & One Love	...Back to Normal	Fading Back To Normal	Producer, writer, mixer
2008	Kinetics & One Love	One and Only (feat. Christine Dominguez)	The Kinetics EP	Producer, writer, mixer
2008	Kinetics	High Noon	The Kinetics EP	Producer, mixer
