= Kinetics (rapper) =

American rapper

- Born: Jeremy Dussolliet; Brooklyn, New York
- Origin: New York City, New York, United States of America
- Genres: Hip hop
- Years active: 2009–present
- Website: www.kineticsandonelove.com

Jeremy Dussolliet, known professionally as Kinetics is a rapper and songwriter based in New York City who has been releasing hip-hop projects since 2008. He has collaborated with R.A. the Rugged Man, Skyzoo, Remedy from Wu-Tang Killa Bees, Termanology, Accent, the Unknown Prophets and others, but is best known for his work with friend and longtime collaborator, NYC producer One Love. In 2009, Kinetics & One Love started releasing experimental hip-hop projects and writing and producing for other artists.

== Early life ==
Jeremy "Kinetics" Dussolliet was born in Brooklyn, New York and raised in the Hudson Valley. He started writing poetry and rapping in high school but did not release any original music until he met Tim "One Love" Sommers – a drummer, producer and DJ at Cornell University, where the two were both students. The two started working on songs together in 2007, with One Love handling the production and Kinetics providing rap vocals. In 2008, Kinetics released a free seven-track EP online, which helped the rapper first develop a small buzz in the New York area. One Love produced two songs off the project and played keys on a third. A popular song on The Kinetics EP, "High Noon," addressed a real incident in which Kinetics was sliced in the face by an opponent’s box-cutter during a rap battle in a club parking lot.

After the release of The Kinetics EP, Kinetics & One Love decided to form a group and start an artist project together. The first Kinetics & One Love album, Fading Back To Normal, was released in 2009. That album contained the Kinetics & One Love original, “Airplanes,” which was later bought by Atlantic Records and re-released commercially as the second single of rapper B.o.B's debut album.

In the summer of 2012, Kinetics released his first mixtape entitled With A Little Help From My Friends, featuring guest appearances from R.A. the Rugged Man, Remedy, Nitty Scott, Dylan Owen, the Unknown Prophets and Lower East Side-based rapper and poet Accent. On August 28, 2012, Kinetics & One Love released their second album entitled You Are Not Alone, with guest appearances from Termanology, Wynter Gordon, Nitty Scott and Accent.

Since 2013, Kinetics has been featured on tracks by Neon Hitch, King Deco and Accent as well as the chorus of “No Reservation” by BK Brasco, Timbaland and Pusha T. In 2014 he took a hiatus from releasing projects, however, to focus on songwriting for other artists. He is currently managed by Nullah Sarker of Hourglass Entertainment and Lava Music Publishing.

== Musical style and lyrical content ==
Kinetics has described his musical style as east coast cypher rap fused with a pop songwriting approach to choruses, production and overall presentation – especially in his collaborations with One Love. Characteristic elements of his rapping include strings of multisyllabic rhymes, alliteration, double-entendres and extended metaphors. He also likes song-long story tracks, often ending with twists or grand revelations. The song “Michelle,” for example, is a coming of age story about an immigrant girl living in the Bronx in the 1970s - doubling as a metaphor for and personification of the genre of hip-hop, in the spirit of rapper Common’s "I Used to Love H.E.R." He has also noted film director Christopher Nolan as a major influence on his storytelling style (specifically the aspects of time distortion in narratives and twist endings), and sometimes calls himself "hip-hop's Chris Nolan."

Kinetics & One Love often focus on mankind's future decisions its ability to react to technology and overpopulation. Technology and computers have become such prevalent themes in their music that Kinetics & One Love have adopted alter egos as alien computer programs and often refer to themselves as robots and cyborgs in their songs. Kinetics has frequently referenced the scientist and inventor Nikola Tesla.

== Songwriting credits ==
Together with his producer and writing partner One Love, Kinetics has cowritten for a variety of artists including B.o.B, Pitbull, Eminem and Melanie Martinez and Madison Beer making his commercial debut in 2010 by penning the chorus to B.o.B's Grammy nominated, platinum selling single "Airplanes" featuring Hayley Williams of Paramore.

Year	Artist	Album	Track
2010	B.o.B	The Adventures of Bobby Ray	"Airplanes" (Feat. Hayley Williams)
2010	B.o.B	The Adventures of Bobby Ray	"Airplanes pt. II" (Feat. Hayley Williams & Eminem)
2013	Hook N Sling & Chris Willis	Single	"Magnet"
2013	Dimitri Vegas & Like Mike	Single	"Find Tomorrow (Ocarina)" (Feat. Wolfpack & Katy B)
2014	Neon Hitch	301 to Paradise	"Intro"
2014	Neon Hitch	301 to Paradise	"Gypsy Star"
2014	Neon Hitch	301 to Paradise	"Red Lights"
2014	Neon Hitch	301 to Paradise	"We Can't Stop"
2014	Neon Hitch	301 to Paradise	"Subtitles" (Feat. Kinetics)
2014	Neon Hitch	301 to Paradise	"Some Like It Hot" (Feat. Kinetics)
2014	Neon Hitch	Eleutheromaniac	"Yard Sale"
2014	Melanie Martinez	Dollhouse EP	"Dollhouse"
2014	Melanie Martinez	Dollhouse EP	"Carousel"
2014	Melanie Martinez	Dollhouse EP	"Dead to Me"
2014	Pitbull	Globalization	"This Is Not A Drill" (Feat. Bebe Rexha)
	Christina Grimmie	ADORE EP	"Cliche"
2015	Clarity	Single	"Sharks In The Swimming Pool"
2015	Clarity	Alienation	"Velcro"
2015	Katy Tiz	Single	"Whistle (While You Work It)"
2015	Melanie Martinez	Cry Baby	"Cry Baby"
2015	Melanie Martinez	Cry Baby	"Dollhouse"
2015	Melanie Martinez	Cry Baby	"Sippy Cup"
2015	Melanie Martinez	Cry Baby	"Carousel"
2015	Melanie Martinez	Cry Baby	"Alphabet Boy"
2015	Melanie Martinez	Cry Baby	"Milk and Cookies"
2015	Melanie Martinez	Cry Baby	"Mrs. Potato Head"
2015	Melanie Martinez	Cry Baby	"Mad Hatter"
2015	Jasmine Thompson	Single	"Do It Now"
2016	King Deco	Single	"Castaway"
2016	Sophie Beem	Sophie Beem EP	"Skyline"
2016	Sophie Beem	Sophie Beem EP	"Sleepless/City Kid"
2016	Sophie Beem	Sophie Beem EP	"Nail Polish"
2016	The Lonely Island	Popstar: Never Stop Never Stopping Soundtrack	"Incredible Thoughts" (Feat. Michael Bolton)
2018	Madison Beer	As She Pleases	"Fools"
2018	Madison Beer	As She Pleases	"Tyler Durden"
2018	Madison Beer	As She Pleases	"Teenager In Love"
2023	Melanie Martinez	Portals	Milk of the Siren

== Discography ==
- The Kinetics EP (2008)
- Fading Back To Normal (2009) (collaborative project with producer One Love)
- With A Little Help From My Friends (2012)
- You Are Not Alone (2012) (collaborative project with producer One Love)
