= Kinetics & One Love =

Hip-hop and songwriting duo

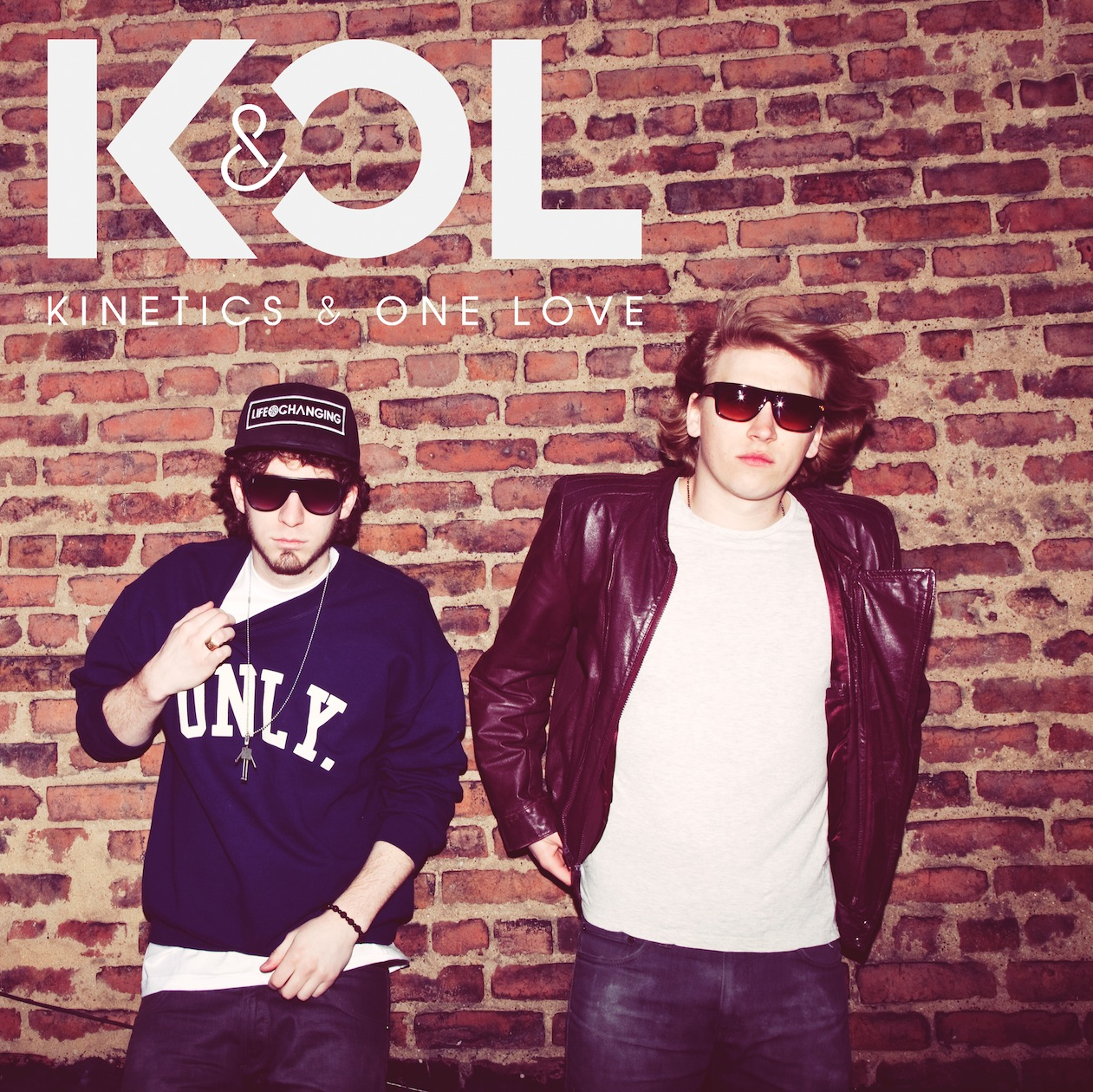
- Kinetics & One Love

Background information
- Origin: New York City
- Genres: Hip hop; pop
- Years active: 2009–present
- Members: Jeremy "Kinetics" Dussolliet; Tim "One Love" Sommers
- Website: www.kineticsandonelove.com

Jeremy "Kinetics" Dussolliet and Tim "One Love" Sommers are an American musical duo from New York City. They made their commercial debut as songwriters in 2010 by penning the chorus to B.o.B's single "Airplanes". They have collaborated with R.A. the Rugged Man and Remedy from Wu-Tang Killa Bees, Termanology and the Unknown Prophets, Neon Hitch, Melanie Martinez, Madison Beer and Wynter Gordon.

== About ==
Kinetics & One Love began writing music together after meeting in 2007 and forming a hip-hop group – with Kinetics as the rapper and One Love as the producer. In 2009, they released their first album Fading Back to Normal, featuring the original Kinetics & One Love version of "Airplanes," with One Love production and Kinetics rap verses. After handing out a few hundred copies of the album around New York, a copy made its way into the offices of Atlantic Records in New York City. While still college students at Cornell University, Dussolliet and Sommers were invited to the label to speak with A&Rs from Atlantic and, in early 2010, signed a publishing deal with Warner/Chappell Music, Inc. "Airplanes" was bought by Atlantic and became the second single off rapper B.o.B's debut album, The Adventures of Bobby Ray. Paramore's Hayley Williams was also featured on the track. The song climbed to the number 2 spot on the Billboard Hot 100. A second version of "Airplanes" featuring Eminem was also included on B.o.B's album and was nominated for a Grammy for Best Pop Collaboration.

After the release of "Airplanes," Kinetics & One Love moved to New York City and began writing and producing for various pop and indie artists, managed by Nullah Sarker of Hourglass Entertainment. In the summer of 2012, Kinetics released a hip-hop mixtape entitled With A Little Help From My Friends, with guest appearances by R.A. the Rugged Man, Remedy, Nitty Scott, and others. One Love produced half of the songs on the mixtape and mixed and engineered the entire project. On August 28, 2012, Kinetics & One Love released their second album You Are Not Alone, with guest appearances from Termanology, Wynter Gordon, and Nitty Scott. The album broke the top ten on the iTunes hip-hop chart and climbed to #55 on the all albums iTunes chart. It also landed at No. 57 on Billboard Magazine's R&B/Hip-Hop chart and No. 32 on its Heatseekers chart..

== Selected songwriting and production credits ==
Year	Artist	Song	Album	Certification
2023	Jimin of BTS, Kodak Black, NLE Choppa, JVKE, Muni Long	Angel Pt. 1	Fast X Original Motion Picture Soundtrack	
2023	Madison Beer	Home To Another One	Silence Between Songs	
2023	Melanie Martinez	TUNNEL VISION	Portals	
2023	Melanie Martinez	MILK OF THE SIREN	Portals	
2023	Julia Wolf	Get Off My	Good Thing We Stayed	
2023	Julia Wolf	Hot Killer	Good Thing We Stayed	
2023	Julia Wolf	Rookie Of The Year	Good Thing We Stayed	
2023	Julia Wolf	Sorority Girls	Good Thing We Stayed	
2023	Julia Wolf	Dracula	Good Thing We Stayed	
2022	Rosa Linn	Snap	Single	Gold
2022	Madison Beer	Showed Me (How I Fell In Love With You)	Single	
2022	Madison Beer	Dangerous	Single	
2022	Fletcher	Better Version [feat. Kelsea Ballerini]	Girl Of My Dreams	
2022	Fletcher	Becky's So Hot	Girl Of My Dreams	
2022	Fletcher	Guess We Lied	Girl Of My Dreams	
2022	Tate McRae	What's Your Problem	I Used To Think I Could Fly	
2022	Bryce Vine	y can't we b friends?	Single	
2022	Bryce Vine	American Dream	Single	
2022	Morgan Evans	Over for You	Single	
2021	Madison Beer	Selfish	Life Support	Platinum
2021	Madison Beer	Good In Goodbye	Life Support	
2021	Madison Beer	Stay Numb and Carry On	Life Support	
2021	Madison Beer	Homesick	Life Support	
2021	Madison Beer	Sour Times	Life Support	
2021	Madison Beer	Baby	Life Support	
2021	Madison Beer	Stained Glass	Life Support	
2021	Madison Beer	Reckless	Single	
2021	Anthony Ramos	Blessings	Love and Lies	
2021	Anthony Ramos	Control	Love and Lies	
2021	Anthony Ramos	Pray For Me	Love and Lies	
2021	Charlotte Lawrence	Rx	Charlotte	
2021	Julia Wolf	Falling In Love	Girls In Purgatory	
2020	Jennifer Lopez	In the Morning	Single	
2020	Lil Wayne	Dreams	Funeral	
2020	Adam Lambert	Velvet	Velvet	
2020	FLETCHER	Forever	Single	
2020	FLETCHER	Last Laugh	Promising Young Woman (Original Motion Picture Soundtrack)	
2020	lovelytheband	Emo	Conversations With Myself About You	
2020	lovelytheband	I Should Be Happy	Conversations With Myself About You	
2020	Travis Barker, Captain Cuts, Loote, Home Alone	Sex With My Ex	Single	
2019	Tate McRae	Stupid	all the things i never said	Gold
2019	Madison Beer	Dear Society	Single	
2019	Melanie Martinez	Drama Club	K-12	
2019	FLETCHER	Undrunk	you ruined New York city for me	Gold
2019	FLETCHER	If You're Gonna Lie	you ruined New York city for me	
2019	Anthony Ramos	Come Back Home	The Good & The Bad	
2019	David Guetta	Better When You're Gone [Feat. Loote]	Single	
2019	Loote	85%	lost	
2019	Loote	Tomorrow Tonight	lost	
2019	Loote	Lost	lost	
2019	Loote	She's All Yours	lost	
2017	Marc E. Bassy	Plot Twist (feat. KYLE)	Gossip Columns	
2017	Marc E. Bassy	Plot Twist (Remix) [feat. Hailee Steinfeld]	Gossip Columns	
2017	Hailee Steinfeld	Most Girls	Single	2× Platinum
2017	Grace VanderWaal	Sick of Being Told	Just the Beginning	
2016	The Lonely Island	Incredible Thoughts (feat. Michael Bolton and Justin Timberlake)	Popstar: Never Stop Never Stopping	
2015	Melanie Martinez	Dollhouse	Cry Baby	2× Platinum
2015	Melanie Martinez	Carousel	Cry Baby	Platinum
2015	Melanie Martinez	Sippy Cup	Cry Baby	Gold
2015	Melanie Martinez	Mrs. Potato Head	Cry Baby	Gold
2015	Melanie Martinez	Alphabet Boy	Cry Baby	Gold
2015	Melanie Martinez	Cry Baby	Cry Baby	Gold
2015	Melanie Martinez	Mad Hatter	Cry Baby	Platinum
2015	Melanie Martinez	Milk And Cookies	Cry Baby	Gold
2015	Katy Tiz	Whistle (While You Work It)	Single	
2014	Pitbull	This Is Not A Drill (feat. Bebe Rexha)	Globalization	
2010	B.o.B	Airplanes (feat. Hayley Williams of Paramore)	B.o.B Presents: The Adventures of Bobby Ray	6× Platinum
2010	B.o.B	Airplanes, Pt. II (feat. Eminem & Hayley Williams of Paramore)	B.o.B Presents: The Adventures of Bobby Ray	

== Discography ==
- The Kinetics EP (2008) (solo Kinetics project)
- Fading Back To Normal (2009)
- With A Little Help From My Friends (2012) (solo Kinetics project)
- You Are Not Alone (2012)

== Awards ==
- 2011 Grammy nomination for Best Pop Collaboration
- 2011 ASCAP Pop Music Award
- 2011 ASCAP Rhythm & Soul Music Award
