= Pity Party (song) =

Single by Melanie Martinez

from the album Cry Baby
- Released: June 2, 2015
- Recorded: April 2014
- Genre: Alternative pop; electro
- Length: 3:24
- Label: Atlantic
- Songwriters: Christopher Baran; Kara DioGuardi; John Gluck; Wally Gold; Seymour Gottlieb; Melanie Martinez; Herb Wiener
- Producer: CJ Baran

Melanie Martinez singles chronology
"Carousel" (2014)	"Pity Party" (2015)	"Soap" (2015)

Music video
- "Pity Party" on YouTube

"Pity Party" is a song by American singer-songwriter Melanie Martinez based on Lesley Gore's 1963 hit "It's My Party". It was released as the lead single from her (Note: Martinez uses she/her and they/them pronouns. This article uses she/her pronouns for consistency.) debut album, Cry Baby (2015), on June 2, 2015. The music video was released on June 1, 2015. It impacted contemporary hit radio on March 22, 2016.

== Background and composition ==
An alt-pop and electro track, the song uses the chorus from Lesley Gore's "It's My Party" released in 1963, as an interpolation, and also employs the iconic repeating-note horns hook from the original song as the recurring theme throughout. On July 28, 2016, the song was certified Gold by the RIAA, having sold 500,000 copies.

Regarding the song, Martinez said, "This was during my second session with Kara DioGuardi. It was awesome to write that song because I love music from the 50s and 60s. When I was singing, Kara said my voice reminded her of Judy Garland and artists from that time. I really wanted to write about no one showing up to my birthday party and the song is perfect inspiration for this theme. I love samples, especially older songs because they can put a new take on an old song. So we were really inspired by that and we sampled it for the first line of the chorus and that is how 'Pity Party' came about".

Mike Wass of Idolator noted how both "Pity Party" and Grace's single "You Don't Own Me" are based on Lesley Gore's songs, saying "there seems to be a revival of the late Lesley Gore's music afoot".

== Music video ==
The music video for "Pity Party" was released on June 1, 2015. However, the video was leaked 3 days prior to the official release. The video was directed by Melanie herself, describing it as a "fun experience for her", considering she's the only person featured in the video.

A behind the scenes video was released June 17, 2015.

== Track listing ==
Digital download and streaming
No.	Title	Length
1.	"Pity Party"	3:24

Remixes EP
No.	Title	Length
1.	"Pity Party" (Madison Mars Remix)	4:45
2.	"Pity Party" (Kayliox Remix)	4:43
3.	"Pity Party" (XVII Remix)	4:01
4.	"Pity Party" (K Theory Remix)	4:58
5.	"Pity Party" (The Feels Remix)	4:32
6.	"Pity Party" (Myles Travitz Remix)	3:02
7.	"Pity Party" (Kassiano Remix)	4:04

== Charts ==
Chart (2016)	Peak position
Czech Republic Singles Digital (ČNS IFPI)	65
Finland (Suomen virallinen radiosoittolista)	36
Slovakia Singles Digital (ČNS IFPI)	70
UK Singles (OCC)	175
US Bubbling Under Hot 100 (Billboard)	4
US Pop Airplay (Billboard)	40

== Certifications ==
Region	Certification	Certified units/sales
Canada (Music Canada)	Platinum	80,000^{‡}
New Zealand (RMNZ)	Gold	15,000^{‡}
Poland (ZPAV)	Gold	25,000^{‡}
United Kingdom (BPI)	Silver	200,000^{‡}
United States (RIAA)	2× Platinum	2,000,000^{‡}
^{‡} Sales+streaming figures based on certification alone.

== Release history ==
Region	Date	Format	Label	Ref.
United States	June 2, 2015	Digital download	Atlantic; Warner	
United Kingdom	June 2, 2015	Digital download	Atlantic; Warner	
South Africa	June 2, 2015	Digital download	Atlantic; Warner	
Australia	June 2, 2015	Digital download	Atlantic; Warner	
United States	March 22, 2016	Contemporary hit radio	Atlantic	
Italy	October 21, 2016	Contemporary hit radio	Warner	

== Pity Party EP ==
Pity Party EP

EP by Melanie Martinez
- Released: May 6, 2016
- Length: 15:32
- Label: Atlantic

Melanie Martinez chronology
Cry Baby (2015)	Pity Party EP (2016)	Cry Baby's Extra Clutter EP (2016)

Pity Party EP is Melanie Martinez's second EP, released digitally on May 6, 2016 in Ireland, Mexico and the UK. As an International version of her debut EP Dollhouse EP(2014)

=== Track listing ===
No.	Title	Writer(s)	Producer	Length
1.	"Pity Party"	Melanie Martinez; Christopher Baran; Kara DioGuardi; John Gluck; Wally Gold; Seymour Gottlieb; Herb Wiener	Baran	3:24
2.	"Dollhouse"	Martinez; Jeremy Dussolliet; Sommers	Kinetics & One Love	3:52
3.	"Dead to Me"	Martinez; Dussolliet; Sommers	Kinetics & One Love	3:30
4.	"Bittersweet Tragedy"	Martinez; Daniel Omelio	Robopop	4:49
Total length:				15:32
