= You Are Not Alone (Kinetics & One Love album) =

You Are not Alone

Studio album by Kinetics & One Love
- Released: August 28th, 2012
- Recorded: 2011–2012
- Genre: Hip hop
- Length: 48:45
- Producer: Tim "One Love" Sommers, Jeremy "Kinetics" Dussolliet, Kenna Okoye

Kinetics & One Love chronology
Fading Back to Normal	You Are not Alone

You Are Not Alone is the second album from hip-hop group and songwriting duo Kinetics & One Love. Released on August 28, 2012, the album features guest appearances from Termanology, Wynter Gordon, Nitty Scott, Jon Bellion, Time Out Club's KTSB and the Lower East Side-based rapper and poet Accent. It also features guest production from Kenna Okoye. Within its first two hours on sale, the album broke the top ten on the iTunes hip-hop chart and climbed to #55 on the all albums iTunes chart. It also charted at No. 57 on Billboard Magazine's R&B/Hip-Hop chart and No. 32 on its Heatseekers chart. Upon its release, You Are Not Alone was reviewed by Billboard Magazine, MTV's Buzzworthy, Vibe Magazine, Complex Magazine, The Source Magazine and XXL Magazine.

You Are Not Alone is a socially conscious concept album, reflecting upon the decisions of society as a whole and pondering the future direction of mankind. Throughout the course of the album, rapper Kinetics discusses a broad range of issues, such as teen suicide ("Sign Language"), domestic abuse ("Hideous"), feelings of isolation and being an outcast ("Sometimes I Feel Like A Robot"), declining standards of hip-hop music ("I Am A Computer") and even touches upon the genocide of Native Americans, the use of weapons of mass destruction and overprescription in the pharmaceutical industry (in "You Could Save Us All").

== Track listing ==
1. "I Am a Computer" (4:00)
2. "Hideous" (featuring Mimoza) (3:51)
3. "You Could Save Us All" (3:48)
4. "Still Dreamin'" (featuring Termanology) (3:13)
5. "Sign Language" (featuring Wynter Gordon) (4:45)
6. "Strangers" (featuring Nitty Scott) (3:48)
7. "In My Own World" (featuring Yung Joey) (3:42)
8. "Sometimes I Feel Like a Robot" (4:32)
9. "From Gorillas to Cyborgs" (5:44)
10. "Vecino Del Mar" (featuring KGB) (3:46)
11. "This Too Shall Pass" (featuring Accent & Polina Goudieva) (4:05)
12. "Will You Be Remembered Remix" (featuring KTSB, B.Love & Hunter Stout) (3:31)
