= Cry Baby (Melanie Martinez album) =

2015 studio album by Melanie Martinez

Studio album by Melanie Martinez
- Released: August 14, 2015
- Studio: The Schach (New York City); Freq Show Music (Brooklyn, New York)
- Genre: Pop; alternative pop
- Length: 46:38
- Label: Atlantic
- Producer: Kinetics & One Love; Christopher J. Baran; Kara DioGuardi; Kyle Shearer; SmarterChild; Babydaddy; Frequency; Aalias; Felix Snow

Melanie Martinez chronology
Dollhouse EP (2014)	Cry Baby (2015)	Pity Party EP (2016)

Singles from Cry Baby
- 1. "Pity Party" Released: June 2, 2015; 2. "Soap" Released: July 10, 2015; 3. "Sippy Cup" Released: July 31, 2015

Cry Baby is the debut studio album by American singer and songwriter Melanie Martinez, released on August 14, 2015, through Atlantic Records. Following her appearance on The Voice in 2012, Martinez developed the album as a concept album, centered on a fictional character of the same name which she used to explore themes of emotional vulnerability, family conflict, and troubled relationships.

Cry Baby is a pop and alternative pop album that incorporates toy-like sounds, synth-driven production, and hip-hop-influenced beats. Martinez drew from imagery of childhood and domestic life throughout the record, reworking them into narratives addressing abandonment, abuse, romance, and emotional isolation. She directed and styled the album as well as all of its accompanying music videos, which together form a continuous visual storyline. The album was released in multiple formats, including vinyl, CD, cassette, and digital download, with physical editions featuring special packaging and an illustrated storybook written by Martinez. Three singles were issued from the album, including "Pity Party", "Soap", and "Sippy Cup". Martinez supported the album with the Cry Baby Tour, which ran from 2015 to 2016 and included shows across North America and Europe.

Cry Baby received generally positive reviews from critics, who commented on its cohesive concept and distinctive aesthetic. Commercially, the album debuted at number six on the US Billboard 200 and later achieved multi-platinum certification in the United States. In 2020, the deluxe edition track "Play Date" gained renewed attention after going viral on social media platforms, and it led to the album's re-entry on the Billboard 200.

== Background and production ==
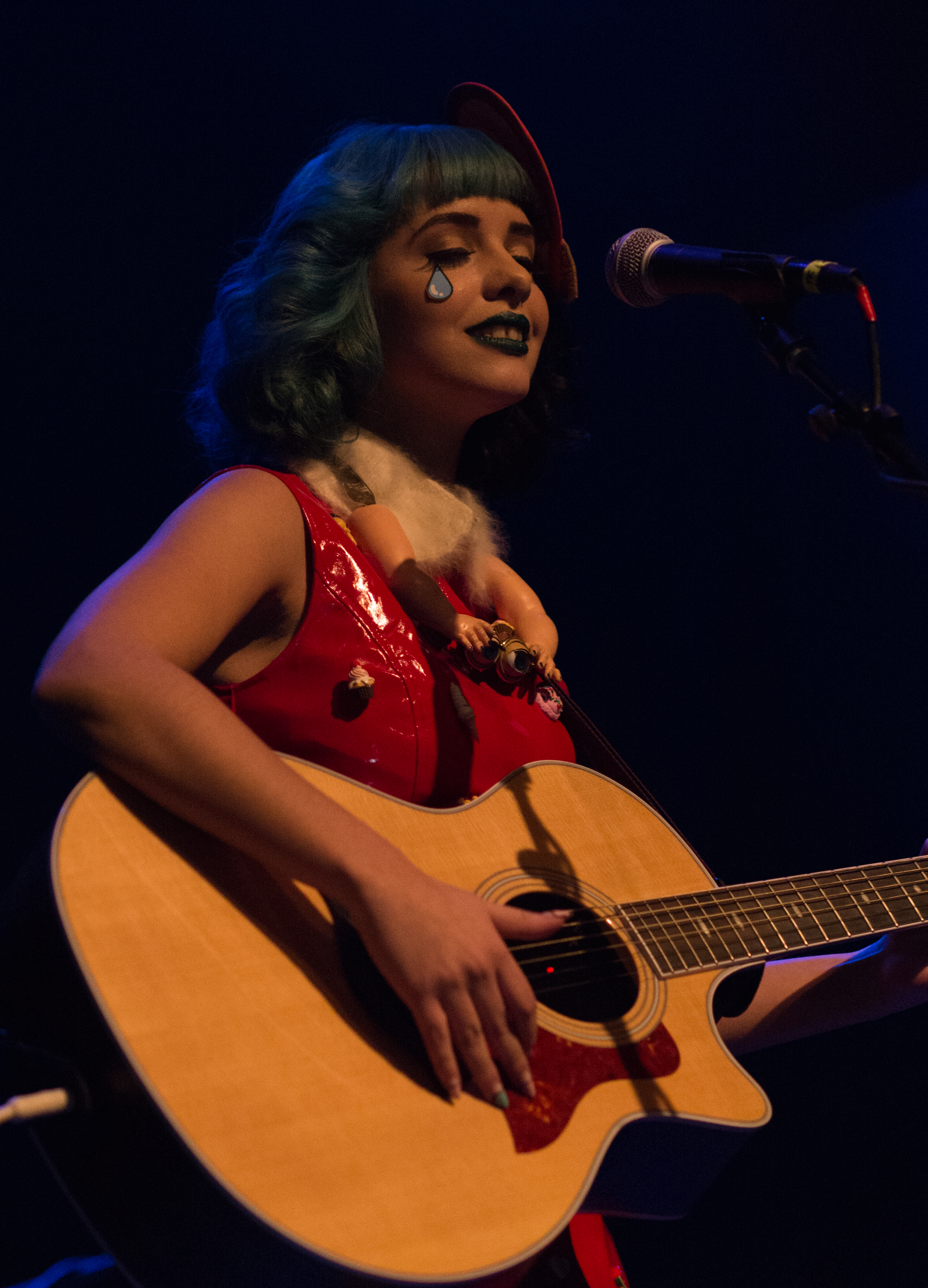
Martinez in 2014, at Gramercy Theater 6

In 2012, Martinez had participated in The Voice, during the period when she was in high school, and she started to gain popularity from there. In May 2014, she released her debut extended play, Dollhouse, which is composed of four tracks.

Martinez directed and styled Cry Baby, in addition to the music videos featured on the album. Martinez said she wanted to name the record Cry Baby, since she had been "teased as a kid for being super emotional" because she "took things way too seriously". Working on the album, Martinez stated that she had been "very emotional and super personal", and making the character Cry Baby assisted her to "deal with [her] own insecurities", saying that she could "throw it all onto Cry Baby" instead of herself.

== Music and lyrics ==
"Mrs. Potato Head"
Martinez described "Mrs. Potato Head" as a song about "feeling the need to change how you look to fit a certain standard", inspired by the idea of pulling apart and rearranging the toy's face as a metaphor for plastic surgery.

Noted as a pop and alternative pop record, Cry Baby is a concept album where Martinez focuses on the inner conflicts and painful romance of family life. According to Popdust, the album adapts an assemblage of "toy-like sounds and textures", which frames a narrative centered on a young girl confronting themes such as "abandonment" ("Pity Party"), "bloody terror" ("Sippy Cup"), "exhilarating love" ("Training Wheels"), "crippling heartache" ("Soap" and "Alphabet Boy"), "glossy optimism" ("Mad Hatter"), and "emotional emptiness" ("Pacify Her"). Lyrically, Cry Baby is a "twisted blend of childhood naïveté, teenage angst, and adult apathy, all of which are sung over creepy synths and hard-hitting hip-hop beats".

Martinez draws on imagery of "youth and family" in several songs such as "Carousel", "Training Wheels", and "Milk and Cookies"; she reworks these songs into R&B- and electro-infused songs that address "familial strife, abuse, and romance gone wrong". She also constructs a world of "enchanted transgressions and human-consuming flaws", using these motifs to encourage listeners to "reconsider" their own experiences.

== Release and promotion ==
=== Marketing and packaging ===
On July 17, 2015, the cover artwork for Cry Baby was revealed. Merchandise bundles also became available to pre-order on Martinez's website, with the digital pre-order available from July 24. In October, she visited Billboard studio to perform "Pity Party" and "Soap". In an interview with American TV channel Fuse in December, Martinez revealed that she would release music videos for all tracks of the album. The music video of the album's title track, "Cry Baby", was released on March 14, 2016. Directed by Martinez, the video surpassed 400,000 views by 2016. "Alphabet Boy"'s music video was revealed on June 2, and a double feature music video for "Tag, You're It" along with "Milk and Cookies" was released on August 23. The remaining music videos were "Pacify Her" (November 16, 2016), "Mrs. Potato Head" (December 1, 2016), and "Mad Hatter" (September 23, 2017), serving as the conclusion to the Cry Baby visual story.

In April 2020, one of the deluxe edition's bonus tracks, "Play Date", reached the Viral 50 songs on Spotify, as a slow-motion fan edit of Timothée Chalamet in Call Me by Your Name went viral on TikTok and sparked a wave of similar celebrity edits. It resulted from a popular trend on multiple platforms where users make an edit repurposing the song's opening-verse title phrase as the punchline to a previously unheard piece of dialogue. On May 1, the song was certified Gold by RIAA; as of December 8, it has been certified Platinum. On May 26, Martinez released the lyric video for the song.

Cry Baby was released on August 14, 2015, through Atlantic Records, as a digital download, CD, vinyl, and audio cassette tape formats. The vinyl and CD contained special packaging, which included a storybook that follows the album by illustrator Chloe Tersigni. The storybook became available in the pre-order bundle, featuring rhymes and illustrations based on the album, written by Martinez herself.

=== Singles ===
Three singles were released from Cry Baby, which failed to chart in the Billboard Hot 100. Martinez debuted "Pity Party" on June 2, 2015, as the lead single from the album. She directed its music video and premiered it on June 1 through YouTube. She stated that "every single song connects to each other and this song was a turning point in the story when no one shows up to her party and she shifts personalities a little". The song was certified Platinum by Recording Industry Association of America (RIAA). On June 30, 2016, Martinez performed the song in Jimmy Kimmel Live. The second single was "Soap", released on July 10. Its music video was released on November 18, as a double feature with "Training Wheels". The song was certified Platinum by RIAA on February 28, 2020. "Sippy Cup" was chosen as the third and last single from the album on July 31. Martinez released its snippet on July 28; two days later, Spin premiered the song's music video which served as the second part of her 2014 single "Dollhouse".

=== Tour ===
Cry Baby
- Tour by Melanie Martinez
- Associated album: Cry Baby
- Start date: August 26, 2015
- End date: November 28, 2016
- Legs: 9
- No. of shows: 98 in North America; 4 in Oceania; 5 in Latin America; 17 in Europe; 124 in total
- Supporting act: Handsome Ghost

Melanie Martinez concert chronology
- Dollhouse Tour (2014–2015); Cry Baby Tour (2015–2016); K-12 Tour (2019–2020)

The Cry Baby Tour was the second concert tour by Martinez, in support of Cry Baby. It consisted of nine legs and 124 shows, beginning on August 26, 2015, in Charlotte, North Carolina. She announced the final addition of the North American tour in June 2016, and the band Handsome Ghost performed as a supporting act. The second tour in London was added, visiting Heaven and O2 Forum on April 27 and May 7, respectively. The European tour started in Hammersmith Apollo on November 21, and finished in Olympia Theatre, Dublin on November 28.

== Critical reception ==
Professional ratings
Review scores
Source	Rating
ABC News	4.5/5 stars
AllMusic	3.5/5 stars
Atwood Magazine	7.6/10
Billboard	2/5 stars
Outlet	8.5/10
Popdust	4/5
Spin	8/10

Cry Baby received positive reviews from music critics. ABC News described the album as "a jarring, affecting record" that stays with listeners long after it finishes, calling it "not for passive listening" and praising it as a rare pop release that combines strong catchiness with artistic ambition. Jason Scott at Popdust described the album as "13 tracks of pure hypnotic bliss [that] tests the absolute bounds of alt-pop, puncturing and bleeding out of [Martinez's] Lesley Gore and Purity Ring influence", highlighting "Sippy Cup", "Mrs. Potato Head", "Soap", "Cry Baby" and "Alphabet Boy". AllMusic's Matt Collar compared Martinez to Björk and Beyoncé and said that "her songs also fit nicely next to the work of contemporaries like Lorde and Lana Del Rey". Billboard author Jason Lipshutz also stated she drew heavily from the dark pop stylings of both Lorde and Lana Del Rey, but he argued that she lacked the "subtlety of her influences". He suggested that provocative lyrics on songs such as "Dollhouse" can "overshadow" the production, and noted the disturbing subject matter of "Tag, You're It". While acknowledging the album's ambition, Lipstuz concluded that its strict adherence to a central concept sometimes forces the material to be uncomfortable.

Writing for Atwood Magazine, Maggie McHale described Cry Baby as an addictive alt-pop record comparable to artists such as Lana Del Rey and Marina and the Diamonds, highlighting Martinez's sultry yet childlike vocal delivery and the album's blend of innocence and darker lyricism. McHale noted, however, that parts of the album feel less distinctive, with songs such as "Dollhouse", "Training Wheels", and "Pacify Her" resembling material that could appear on similar alt-pop releases, while tracks like "Pity Party", "Soap", and the title track were cited as stronger examples of Martinez's emerging individuality. Brennan Carley of Spin commented that Martinez approaches the album as a concept album built around unsettling contrasts, describing its songs as "saccharine nursery rhymes" that are nonetheless "truly, deeply unsettling". Carley suggested that the record creates a tone that "rattles you with a painted smile". Outlet's Thomas Kraus described Cry Baby as "the most artistic pop album" he had heard in 2015, praising how Martinez developed the album's central theme. He noted a few weaker moments, citing "Training Wheels" as less effective, but concluded that the record largely succeeds by building on its strongest ideas and distinctive visual concept.

Spin named the album number 22 on their list of "The 25 Best Pop Albums of 2015".

== Commercial performance ==
Cry Baby debuted at number 6 on the Billboard 200 with 40,000 units sold in its first week; it also debuted at the top of the Alternative Albums Chart. On February 24, 2017, it was certified Platinum by RIAA, having sold 1,000,000 units in the US; it was among eight debut albums from 2015 that achieved platinum certification. Billboard magazine reported that Cry Baby had remained on the Billboard 200 chart for 104 consecutive weeks as of August 15, without dropping off. In 2020, following the viral success of "Play Date", the album re-entered the Billboard 200.

== Track listing ==
All tracks were written by Melanie Martinez, Jeremy Dussolliet and Tim Sommers while produced by One Love, except where noted.

Standard edition
No.	Title	Writer(s)	Producer(s)	Length
1.	"Cry Baby"			3:59
2.	"Dollhouse"			3:51
3.	"Sippy Cup"			3:15
4.	"Carousel"			3:50
5.	"Alphabet Boy"			4:13
6.	"Soap"	Martinez; Emily Warren Schwartz; Kyle Shearer	Shearer	3:29
7.	"Training Wheels"	Martinez; Scott Hoffman	Babydaddy	3:25
8.	"Pity Party"	Martinez; Christopher J. Baran; Kara DioGuardi; John Gluck; Wally Gold; Seymour Gottlieb; Herb Wiener	Baran	3:24
9.	"Tag, You're It"	Martinez; Scott Harris; Rick Markowitz	SmarterChild; Mike Miller^{[a]}	3:09
10.	"Milk and Cookies"	Martinez; Dussolliet; Markowitz	SmarterChild; Michael Keenan^{[a]}	3:26
11.	"Pacify Her"	Martinez; Chloe Angelides; Keenan	Keenan	3:40
12.	"Mrs. Potato Head"	Martinez; Dussolliet; Sommers	Kinetics & One Love	3:37
13.	"Mad Hatter"	Martinez; Dussolliet; Bryan Fryzel; Aaron Kleinstub	Frequency; Aalias	3:21
Total length:				46:38

Deluxe edition
No.	Title	Writer(s)	Producer(s)	Length
14.	"Play Date"	Martinez; Jennifer Decilveo	Keenan; Decilveo^{[a]}	2:59
15.	"Teddy Bear"	Martinez; Phoebe Ryan; Felix Snow	Snow	4:05
16.	"Cake"	Martinez; Baran; DioGuardi	Baran	3:19
Total length:				57:01

=== Notes ===
- ^{^[a]} signifies an additional producer.
- "Pity Party" samples Lesley Gore's "It's My Party" (1963), written by Wally Gold, John Gluck, Herb Wiener, and Seymour Gottlieb.

== Credits and personnel ==
Credits were adapted from the liner notes.

Recording locations

- The Schach; New York, New York (7)
- Freq Show Music Studios; Brooklyn, New York (13)

Personnel

- Melanie Martinez – vocals, songwriter, art direction, design
- Jeremy "Kinetics" Dussolliet – songwriter
- Tim "One Love" Sommers – songwriter, producer, engineer
- Emily Warren – songwriter
- Kyle Shearer – songwriter, producer
- Scott Hoffman – songwriter
- Babydaddy – producer, keyboards, programmer
- JL Brown – additional vocal engineer
- Christopher J. Baran – songwriter, producer, engineer
- Kara DioGuardi – songwriter
- Herb Wiener – songwriter
- Seymour Gottlieb – songwriter
- John Gluck – songwriter
- Wally Gold – songwriter
- Chris Gehringer – mastering
- Rick "SmarterChild" Markowitz – songwriter, producer, engineer
- Scott Harris – songwriter
- Mike Miller – additional producer
- Michael Keenan – additional producer, songwriter, engineer
- Chloe Angelides – songwriter
- Bryan Fryzel – songwriter
- Aaron Kleinstub – songwriter
- Frequency & Aalias – producer, recording, keyboards, programming
- Craig Bruck – booking agent
- Jeff Levin – A&R direction, A&R
- Pete Ganbarg – A&R direction
- Nina Webb – marketing
- Caiti Green – marketing
- Anne DeClemente – A&R administration
- Sachiko Asano – art direction, design
- Chloe Tersigni – illustration
- Lissy Elle – photography

== Charts ==
=== Weekly charts ===
Weekly chart performance
Chart (2015–2024)	Peak position
Argentine Albums (CAPIF)	7
Australian Albums (ARIA)	27
Belgian Albums (Ultratop Flanders)	77
Belgian Albums (Ultratop Wallonia)	149
Canadian Albums (Billboard)	10
Croatian International Albums (HDU)	19
Dutch Albums (Album Top 100)	65
Estonian Albums (Eesti Tipp-40)	36
Finnish Albums (Suomen virallinen lista)	36
Greek Albums (IFPI)	40
Hungarian Physical Albums (MAHASZ)	13
Irish Albums (IRMA)	35
Italian Albums (FIMI)	18
Lithuanian Albums (AGATA)	36
Mexican Albums (AMPROFON)	7
New Zealand Albums (RMNZ)	21
Polish Albums (ZPAV)	36
Portuguese Albums (AFP)	23
Scottish Albums (Official Charts)	15
Spanish Albums (Promusicae)	6
UK Albums (Official Charts)	32
US Billboard 200	6
US Top Alternative Albums (Billboard)	1
US Top Rock & Alternative Albums (Billboard)	18
US Indie Store Album Sales (Billboard)	7

=== Year-end charts ===
Year-end chart performance
Chart (2016)	Position
US Billboard 200	44
Chart (2017)	Position
US Billboard 200	87
Chart (2022)	Position
Lithuanian Albums (AGATA)	90
Chart (2024)	Position
Belgian Albums (Ultratop Flanders)	165
Croatian International Albums (HDU)	37
US Billboard 200	178

== Certifications ==
List of certifications and sales
Region	Certification	Certified units/sales
Canada (Music Canada)	Platinum	80,000^{‡}
Denmark (IFPI Danmark)	Platinum	20,000^{‡}
Italy (FIMI)	Gold	25,000^{‡}
Mexico (AMPROFON)	2× Platinum	120,000^{‡}
New Zealand (RMNZ)	2× Platinum	30,000^{‡}
United Kingdom (BPI)	Platinum	300,000^{‡}
United States (RIAA)	2× Platinum	2,000,000^{‡}
^{‡} Sales+streaming figures based on certification alone.

== Release history ==
List of release dates and formats
Region	Date	Format	Edition	Label	Ref.
Various	August 14, 2015	CD; digital download; streaming	Standard; deluxe	Atlantic	
Various	2016	Cassette	Standard	Atlantic	
Various	November 25, 2022	LP	Deluxe	Atlantic	
Various	May 17, 2024	CD	Deluxe	Atlantic	
Various	September 12, 2025	LP	Anniversary	Atlantic	(Note: The anniversary edition includes the deluxe edition bonus tracks alongside the Dollhouse EP.)

== Cry Baby's Extra Clutter EP ==
Cry Baby's Extra Clutter EP

EP by Melanie Martinez
- Released: November 25, 2016
- Length: 13:51
- Label: Atlantic
- Producer: Michael Keenan; Felix Snow; CJ Baran; Arthur McArthur

Melanie Martinez chronology
Pity Party EP (2016)	Cry Baby's Extra Clutter EP (2016)	K–12 (2019)

Singles from Cry Baby's Extra Clutter EP
- 1. "Gingerbread Man" Released: January 29, 2016

Cry Baby's Extra Clutter EP is the third extended play by American singer Melanie Martinez. It was released on November 25, 2016, through Atlantic Records. The EP received a physical vinyl release, being available via Urban Outfitters and Martinez's website. It includes a Christmas single, "Gingerbread Man".

=== Track listing ===
Standard edition
No.	Title	Writer(s)	Producer(s)	Length
1.	"Play Date"	Melanie Martinez; Jenny D	Michael Keenan; D^{[c]}	2:59
2.	"Teddy Bear"	Martinez; Phoebe Ryan; Felix Snow	Snow	4:05
3.	"Cake"	Martinez; Christopher J. Baran; Kara Dioguardi	Baran	3:19
4.	"Gingerbread Man"	Martinez; Keenan; Jeremy McArthur	Keenan; McArthur	3:28
Total length:				13:51

Notes

- ^{^[c]} signifies an additional producer.

=== Personnel ===
Credits were adapted from the liner notes.

- Melanie Martinez – lead vocals, songwriter, art direction
- Jenny D – songwriter, additional producer
- Michael Keenan – songwriter, producer
- Phoebe Ryan – songwriter
- Felix Snow – songwriter, producer
- Christopher J. Baran – songwriter, producer, engineer
- Kara DioGuardi – songwriter
- Jeremy McArthur – songwriter, producer
- Craig Bruck – booking agent
- Jeff Levin – A&R
- Pete Ganbarg – A&R
- Nina Webb – marketing
- Caiti Green – marketing
- Anne DeClemente – A&R administration
- Chris Gehringer – master
- Sachiko Asano – art direction
- Chloe Tersigni – illustration

=== Release history ===
List of release dates and formats
Region	Date	Format	Label	Ref.
Various	November 25, 2016	LP	Atlantic	
