= Mrs. Potato Head (song) =

2015 song by Melanie Martinez

- Physical edition Cry Baby storybook art for "Mrs. Potato Head"

Song by Melanie Martinez

from the album Cry Baby
- Genre: Dark wave
- Length: 3:37
- Label: Atlantic; Warner/Chappell
- Songwriters: Melanie Martinez; Jeremy Dussolliet; Tim Sommers
- Producer: One Love

Music video
- "Mrs. Potato Head" on YouTube

"Mrs. Potato Head" is a song by American singer-songwriter Melanie Martinez from her (Note: Martinez uses she/her and they/them pronouns. This article uses she/her pronouns for consistency.) debut album, Cry Baby (2015). Lyrically, the song deals with plastic surgery, its consequences, and the struggle for beauty in the modern world, especially for women. It was written by Martinez, Jeremy Dussolliet, and Tim Sommers, and was produced by Kinetics & One Love.

"Mrs. Potato Head" was hailed as a highlight of Cry Baby, with critics praising Martinez's songwriting and vocal delivery, Kinetics & One Love's production, and the song's overall theme.

On December 1, 2016, a music video of the song was released, depicting the fictional protagonist of the song's parent album, Cry Baby, watching the decay of a woman pressured to undergo plastic surgery , through a television screen.

The song charted and peaked at number five on the Billboard Bubbling Under Hot 100 chart.

== Background and composition ==
"Mrs. Potato Head" is a dark wave song that is three minutes and thirty-seven seconds. Lyrically, "Mrs. Potato Head" has been noted for its lyrics on plastic surgery and its consequences. In an interview with Vice's Noisey.com, Melanie Martinez stated, "I had the idea for "Mrs. Potato Head" for a long time and the whole visual I had in my head was the fact that you can pull toy pieces off the face and that could represent plastic surgery." In an interview with Billboard, Martinez stated that "Mrs. Potato Head" was "the most challenging song to write, but it was worth it."

== Critical reception ==
"Mrs. Potato Head" received acclaim from critics. In his review of Cry Baby, Allan Raible of ABC News, deemed "Mrs. Potato Head" a highlight of Cry Baby. He went on to call "Mrs. Potato Head" a "biting critique" on plastic surgery, and an overall "masterpiece". Jason Scott of PopDust, called the track "a revelation on plastic surgery and the need for torturous beauty", and called the track a "must listen". Thomas Kraus of Outlet Magazine dubbed "Mrs. Potato Head" his favorite track from Cry Baby, and rated the track 10/10. He further praised Martinez's lyricism and vocal delivery, and ultimately called the song "all-around brilliant".

== Music video ==
A music video for "Mrs. Potato Head" was released December 1, 2016. The video begins with Cry Baby, the fictional protagonist of the song's parent album, watching television advertisements for blonde wigs and diet pills that supposedly make a woman ‘beautiful’. Depressed, Cry Baby stuffs her bra and covers her hair with a wig to appear beautiful. Cry Baby then returns to watching television, where she sees the fictional titular character described in the song, Mrs. Potato Head, undergo many cosmetic operations, as a result of her husband, Mr. Potato Head, requesting she get a facelift. The fictitious couple then regret the decision to alter Mrs. Potato Head's body through cosmetic surgery, as said surgery has backfired and ruined her natural beauty. Mr. Potato Head lets his wife wear a wig in a feeble attempt to make her look better. Mrs. Potato Head realizes she was beautiful without her numerous cosmetic operations, and that she was attempting to conform to modern beauty standards. In the end, Mr. Potato Head leaves Mrs. Potato Head for another woman, and Cry Baby removes her own "enhancements" out of shock. Cry Baby then realized her true beauty.

Maggie Dickman of Alternative Press praised the video, saying it was "eerily amazing". Dickman further lauded the video, stating, "In her classic style, Martinez challenges traditional beauty stereotypes in the most real way possible."

== Charts ==
"Mrs. Potato Head" charted and peaked at number five on the Billboard Bubbling Under Hot 100 chart for the week of December 24, 2016.

=== Weekly charts ===
Chart (2016)	Peak position
US Bubbling Under Hot 100 (Billboard)	5

== Certifications ==
Region	Certification	Certified units/sales
Canada (Music Canada)	Gold	40,000^{‡}
New Zealand (RMNZ)	Gold	15,000^{‡}
United Kingdom (BPI)	Silver	200,000^{‡}
United States (RIAA)	Gold	500,000^{‡}
^{‡} Sales+streaming figures based on certification alone.
