= Soap (song) =

2015 single by Melanie Martinez

Single by Melanie Martinez

from the album Cry Baby
- Released: July 10, 2015
- Recorded: July 2014
- Genre: Alt-pop
- Length: 3:29
- Label: Atlantic
- Songwriters: Melanie Martinez; Emily Warren; Kyle Shearer
- Producer: Kyle Shearer

Melanie Martinez singles chronology
"Pity Party" (2015)	"Soap" (2015)	"Sippy Cup" (2015)

Music video
- "Soap/Training Wheels" on YouTube

"Soap" is a song by American singer Melanie Martinez, featured on her (Note: Martinez uses she/her and they/them pronouns. This article uses she/her pronouns for consistency.) debut studio album, Cry Baby. The song was released along with a music video on July 10, 2015, as the second single of the album, and was serviced to Alternative radio stations in August. Co-written by Kyle Shearer, who produced the track, and Emily Warren, it was featured in the 2016 film Nerve.

== Background and composition ==
In the interview with Elle, Martinez stated: "Soap was written about my current boyfriend when we were first talking, I felt too scared to say how I felt about him and thought if I told him it'd be like throwing a toaster in his bath. So I washed my mouth out with soap. I think anyone can really relate to this song. I'm sure there was a time in everyone's life where they felt too scared to say how they felt so they 'washed their mouth out with soap'. Everyone is allowed to be vulnerable. I think women and men and dogs and cats and ants and aliens can all express themselves and be vulnerable."

"Soap" was premiered exclusively on Elle magazine's website on July 9, 2015. An alt-pop track, it was released as the second single from Martinez's debut studio album, Cry Baby. The song was serviced to Alternative radio stations in August. "Soap" was later featured in the 2016 film Nerve.

== Music video ==
The music video for "Soap" was released July 10, 2015, the same day the song was released. It was directed by a couple of Martinez's friends in her hotel room tub. Another music video for "Soap" was released November 18, as a double feature music video with her song "Training Wheels".

== Track listing ==
Digital download

1. Soap – 3:29

Remixes - EP

1. Soap (Steve James remix) – 3:59
2. Soap (Gladiator remix) – 3:07
3. Soap (Stooki Sound remix) – 4:42
4. Soap (Luxxury remix) – 6:38
5. Soap (Sailors remix) – 3:41
6. Soap (Jerome Price remix) – 4:48

== Personnel ==
- Mixing – Mitch McCarthy
- Mastering – Chris Gehringer

== Charts ==
Weekly chart performance
Chart (2015)	Peak position
Alternative Digital Songs (Billboard)	12
Twitter Top Tracks (Billboard)	26

== Certifications ==
Certifications and sales
Region	Certification	Certified units/sales
Canada (Music Canada)	Gold	40,000^{‡}
New Zealand (RMNZ)	Gold	15,000^{‡}
Poland (ZPAV)	Gold	25,000^{‡}
United Kingdom (BPI)	Silver	200,000^{‡}
United States (RIAA)	Platinum	1,000,000^{‡}
^{‡} Sales+streaming figures based on certification alone.

== Release history ==
Release dates and formats
Region	Date	Format	Label	Ref.
Various	July 10, 2015	Digital download	Atlantic	
United States	August 2015	Alternative radio	Atlantic	
Various	October 23, 2015	Digital download	Atlantic	
