= Play Date (song) =

Song by Melanie Martinez

from the album Cry Baby
- Released: August 14, 2015
- Genre: Dark wave; pop
- Length: 2:59
- Label: Atlantic
- Songwriters: Melanie Martinez; Jennifer Decilveo
- Producers: Michael Keenan; Jennifer Decilveo

Lyric video
- "Play Date" on YouTube

"Play Date" is a song by American singer-songwriter Melanie Martinez from the deluxe edition of her (Note: Martinez uses she/her and they/them pronouns. This article uses she/her pronouns for consistency.) debut album, Cry Baby (2015). In April 2020, the song gained popularity due to its use in an edit of actor Timothée Chalamet which led to its widespread use on the video-sharing app TikTok, receiving over 1.9 billion views for the month. On May 1, 2020, the song was certified Gold by the Recording Industry Association of America (RIAA) for selling over 500,000 units in the United States. This was followed by Platinum and later 2× Platinum in 2022, for selling over 2,000,000 equivalent units in the United States.

== Background ==
"Play Date" was recorded in New York and according to Martinez, was written "pretty quickly."

Despite being released in 2015, the song became a sleeper hit and gained popularity in April 2020 due to widespread use on the app TikTok. By May 8, the song had gained over 80 million streams on Spotify and 40 million views on YouTube. The song has been featured on multiple prominent Spotify playlists, such as Today's Top Hits, Pop Rising and Teen Beats. Martinez was featured on the cover of both Pop Rising and Teen Beats.

On April 28, 2020, Martinez posted on Instagram, addressing the song's success as the "best birthday present ever". When asked if the song would be released as a single, Martinez said that she was not sure "because it very much lives on the Cry Baby album already."

The song is featured in the video game Just Dance 2025 Edition, the routine is a short 2D animation made by French animation studios Eddy and Les Monstres.

== Composition ==
"Play Date"
The chorus of "Play Date"

"Play Date" is a dark wave and pop song. It features a "catchy chorus" and has been described as a "punchy pop anthem" and "a serious mood."

The song's lyrics narrate a woman who is involved in a casual relationship through the metaphor of two children on a play date. Throughout the song, the woman denies that she has romantic feelings for her sexual partner until the end when she confesses that she does.

== Music video ==
Martinez revealed on May 8, 2020, that she was planning to record a music video for "Play Date" from her home.

A lyric video for the song was released on May 26, 2020. It debuted with 1.3 million views in the first 24 hours.

Eventually, Melanie scrapped the video to instead work on the video for her single "The Bakery".

== 100 gecs remix ==
On June 17, 2020, a remix with duo 100 gecs was released. The remix was taken down shortly after its release for unknown reasons. The cover is a drawing of Martinez and the 100 gecs holding three hearts, each of them reading "Melanie Martinez", "100 Gecs" and "Play Date Remix" on the front.

== Charts ==
Chart (2020)	Peak position
Australia (ARIA)	76
Belgium (Ultratip Bubbling Under Flanders)	2
Belgium (Ultratop 50 Wallonia)	46
Czech Republic Singles Digital (ČNS IFPI)	79
Estonia (Eesti Tipp-40)	34
France (SNEP)	138
Greece (IFPI)	53
Ireland (IRMA)	45
Lithuania (AGATA)	33
Malaysia (RIM)	3
Netherlands (Dutch Top 40 Tipparade)	27
Norway (VG-lista)	23
Portugal (AFP)	119
Singapore (RIAS)	6
Slovakia Singles Digital (ČNS IFPI)	77
Swedish Heatseeker (Sverigetopplistan)	1
Switzerland (Schweizer Hitparade)	78
UK Singles (OCC)	78
US Alternative Digital Songs (Billboard)	13
US Rolling Stone Top 100	88

== Certifications ==
Region	Certification	Certified units/sales
Canada (Music Canada)	Gold	40,000^{‡}
New Zealand (RMNZ)	Platinum	30,000^{‡}
Poland (ZPAV)	Platinum	50,000^{‡}
United Kingdom (BPI)	Gold	400,000^{‡}
United States (RIAA)	2× Platinum	2,000,000^{‡}
^{‡} Sales+streaming figures based on certification alone.

== Release history ==
Region	Date	Format	Label	Ref.
Various	August 14, 2015	Digital download; streaming	Atlantic Records	
