= Sippy Cup (song) =

2015 single by Melanie Martinez

Single by Melanie Martinez

from the album Cry Baby
- Released: July 31, 2015
- Length: 3:15
- Label: Atlantic
- Songwriters: Melanie Martinez; Jeremy Dussolliet; Tim Sommers
- Producer: One Love

Melanie Martinez singles chronology
"Soap" (2015)	"Sippy Cup" (2015)	"Gingerbread Man" (2015)

Music video
- "Sippy Cup" on YouTube

"Sippy Cup" is a song by American singer-songwriter Melanie Martinez, released as the third single from her (Note: Martinez uses she/her and they/them pronouns. This article uses she/her pronouns for consistency.) debut studio album, Cry Baby (2015). Martinez co-wrote the song with Jeremy Dussolliet and Tim Sommers, and One Love produced it. A music video featuring fashion designer Stella Rose Saint Clair was released July 31, 2015.

== Background and composition ==
In the interview with Spin, Martinez described "Sippy Cup" as the second part to her song "Dollhouse", stating: "The song is basically the bridge between the Dollhouse EP and the Cry Baby album. This song is about what actually 'goes down in the kitchen', a deeper look into Crybaby's family life." The song is composed in G minor.

== Music video ==
Released on July 31, 2015, a music video for "Sippy Cup" features fashion designer Stella Rose Saint Clair.

== Charts ==
Chart (2015)	Peak position
Alternative Digital Songs	18

== Certifications ==
Region	Certification	Certified units/sales
New Zealand (RMNZ)	Gold	15,000^{‡}
United Kingdom (BPI)	Silver	200,000^{‡}
United States (RIAA)	Gold	500,000^{‡}
^{‡} Sales+streaming figures based on certification alone.

== Release history ==
Region	Date	Format	Label	Ref.
Worldwide	July 31, 2015	Digital download (via pre-order of the album)	Atlantic Records	
