= Dollhouse (EP) =

Dollhouse EP

EP by Melanie Martinez
- Released: May 19, 2014
- Recorded: 2013–2014
- Genres: Indie pop; alternative pop; art pop
- Length: 16:07
- Label: Atlantic
- Producers: Kinetics & One Love; Robopop

Melanie Martinez chronology
Dollhouse EP (2014)	Cry Baby (2015)

Singles from Dollhouse EP
- 1. "Dollhouse" Released: February 9, 2014; 2. "Carousel" Released: September 1, 2014

Dollhouse is the debut extended play (EP) by American singer-songwriter Melanie Martinez, released on May 19, 2014, by Atlantic Records. The EP was primarily produced and co-written by hip hop duo Kinetics & One Love. Dollhouse peaked at number four on the Billboard Heatseekers Albums chart.

== Background ==
On April 7, 2014, it was reported by Marketwired that Martinez had signed to Atlantic Records. It was also announced that Martinez would release her (Note: Martinez uses she/her and they/them pronouns. This article uses she/her pronouns for consistency.) debut extended play on May 19, 2014, and would go on a tour promoting the EP beginning on June 4, 2014.

== Chart performance ==
Dollhouse spent 13 weeks on the Billboard Heatseekers Albums chart, where it peaked at number four on June 7, 2014.

Chart (2014)	Peak position
US Heatseekers Albums (Billboard)	4

== Track listing ==
All tracks are written by Melanie Martinez, Tim Sommers, and Jeremy Dussolliet, except where noted. All tracks are produced by Kinetics & One Love, except where noted.

No.	Title	Writer(s)	Producer(s)	Length
1.	"Dollhouse"			3:52
2.	"Carousel"			3:50
3.	"Dead to Me"			3:30
4.	"Bittersweet Tragedy"	Martinez; Daniel Omelio	Robopop	4:49
Total length:				14:81

== Tour ==
Dollhouse Tour
- Tour by Melanie Martinez
- Location: United States
- Associated album: Dollhouse
- Start date: June 4, 2014
- End date: March 13, 2015
- Legs: 3
- No. of shows: 37
- Supporting acts: AJR; Dresses; Mike Squillante

Melanie Martinez concert chronology
- Dollhouse Tour (2014–2015); Cry Baby Tour (2015–2017)

The Dollhouse Tour was the first concert tour by American singer-songwriter Melanie Martinez, to promote her debut EP Dollhouse, consisting of three legs. The tour began on June 4, 2014 in Philadelphia and concluded on March 13, 2015 in Pittsburgh.

=== Set list ===
1. "Mad Hatter"
2. "Carousel"
3. "Alphabet Boy"
4. "Bittersweet Tragedy"
5. "Dead to Me"
6. "Pacify Her"
7. "Cry Baby"
8. "Cake"
9. "Dollhouse"

=== Tour dates ===
List of U.S. concerts showing dates, venue, and opening act
Date	City	Venue	Opening act(s)
June 4, 2014	Philadelphia	World Café Live	Dresses; Mike Squillante
June 5, 2014	Norfolk	FM Backstage	Dresses; Mike Squillante
June 7, 2014	Asheville	The Lab	Dresses; Mike Squillante; Ashley Heath
June 9, 2014	Nashville	High Watt	Dresses; Mike Squillante
June 10, 2014	Atlanta	Vinyl	Dresses; Mike Squillante
June 12, 2014	Carrboro	Cat's Cradle	Dresses; Mike Squillante
June 14, 2014	Charlottesville	The Southern	Dresses; Mike Squillante
June 15, 2014	Baltimore	Soundstage	Dresses; Mike Squillante
June 16, 2014	Vienna	Jammin' Java	Dresses; Mike Squillante
June 18, 2014	Portland	Port City Music Hall	Dresses; Mike Squillante
June 19, 2014	Boston	Middle East	Dresses; Mike Squillante
June 21, 2014	Providence	The Met	Dresses; Mike Squillante
June 24, 2014	New York City	Marlin Room	Dresses; Mike Squillante
November 9, 2014	Dallas	House of Blues	Mike Squillante
November 11, 2014	Denver	Larimer Lounge	Mike Squillante
November 12, 2014	Salt Lake City	Kilby Court	Mike Squillante
November 14, 2014	Seattle	El Corazon Lounge	Mike Squillante
November 15, 2014	Portland	White Eagle	Mike Squillante
November 17, 2014	San Francisco	The Chapel	Mike Squillante
November 19, 2014	San Diego	Voodoo Room	Mike Squillante
November 20, 2014	Los Angeles	The Mint	Mike Squillante
November 22, 2014	Santa Ana	Constellation Room	Mike Squillante
November 24, 2014	Phoenix	Pub Rock	Mike Squillante
January 22, 2015	Hamden	Space	AJR
January 23, 2015	Boston	Brighton Music Hall	AJR
January 24, 2015	Albany	The Hollow	AJR
January 27, 2015	Vienna	Jammin' Java	AJR
January 28, 2015	Philadelphia	World Café Live	AJR
January 29, 2015	New York City	Bowery Ballroom	AJR
February 2, 2015	Detroit	The Shelter	AJR
February 3, 2015	Cleveland	Cambridge Room	AJR
February 5, 2015	Columbus	The Basement	AJR
February 6, 2015	Indianapolis	Deluxe	AJR
February 8, 2015	Madison	The Frequency	AJR
February 10, 2015	Chicago	Lincoln Hall	AJR
February 12, 2015	St. Louis	Off Broadway	AJR
February 13, 2015	Kansas City	Midland Theatre	AJR
March 13, 2015	Pittsburgh	Club AE	AJR
