= Carousel (Melanie Martinez song) =

2014 single by Melanie Martinez

Single by Melanie Martinez

from the EP Dollhouse
- Released: September 1, 2014
- Genre: Indie pop
- Length: 3:50
- Label: Atlantic
- Songwriters: Melanie Martinez; Kinetics & One Love
- Producers: Kinetics & One Love

Melanie Martinez singles chronology
"Dollhouse" (2014)	"Carousel" (2014)	"Pity Party" (2015)

Music video
- "Carousel" on YouTube

"Carousel" is a song by Latin American singer-songwriter Melanie Martinez. The song was featured on Martinez's debut EP, Dollhouse (2014) and her (Note: Martinez uses she/her and they/them pronouns. This article uses she/her pronouns for consistency.) debut studio album Cry Baby (2015). "Carousel" was released on September 1, 2014, as the second single from Dollhouse. A music video accompanying the song was released on October 15, 2014. The song was used in the trailer for the fourth season of the horror anthology television series American Horror Story.

== Background and composition ==
In 2014, the song was featured in a preview of season four of FX's horror anthology series, American Horror Story, with the theme also being a riff on the song. Martinez told the Huffington Post that American Horror Story is "'absolutely, hands down' her favorite show" and mentioned that she contacted FX about the song as soon as she heard about the season's carnival theme. She later received a call from the network two days before the promo aired.

"Carousel" is labeled as indie pop, described by Martinez as, "My feeling in love with someone and being stuck on the same ride and trying to grab them but I never reach them".

== Critical reception ==
Lyndsey Parker of Yahoo! Music praised the song and Martinez, saying, "Melanie Martinez has moved on from The Voice to American Horror Story. And her new song and video are so good. The two-toned-haired Goth girl wonder, one of the most unique contestants to ever appear on The Voice ... While her new video for the song, out just in time for Halloween, isn't quite as twisted as anything on AHS, it's still totally creepy-cool, depicting a doomed romance that literally spins out of control at a dark, deserted Long Island carnival".

== Track listing ==
Single
No.	Title	Length
1.	"Carousel"	3:50
Total length:		3:50

Carousel Remixes – EP
No.	Title	Length
1.	"Carousel (Bobby Green Remix)"	4:37
2.	"Carousel (Bleep Bleep Remix)"	4:02
3.	"Carousel (Eric Sharp Radio Mix)"	4:31
4.	"Carousel (SNBRN Remix)"	5:41
Total length:		18:11

== Charts ==
Chart (2014–2016)	Peak position
Alternative Digital Songs (Billboard)	9
Pop Digital Songs (Billboard)	38

== Certifications ==
Region	Certification	Certified units/sales
Canada (Music Canada)	Gold	40,000^{‡}
Poland (ZPAV)	Gold	25,000^{‡}
United Kingdom (BPI)	Silver	200,000^{‡}
United States (RIAA)	Platinum	1,000,000^{‡}
^{‡} Sales+streaming figures based on certification alone.

== Release history ==
Region	Date	Format	Label	Ref.
United States	Oct 15, 2014	Digital download	Atlantic	
