= Dollhouse (Melanie Martinez song) =

Single by Melanie Martinez

from the EP Dollhouse
- Released: 10 February 2014
- Recorded: September 2013
- Genre: Alternative pop; art pop
- Length: 3:52
- Label: Atlantic
- Songwriters: Melanie Martinez; Kinetics & One Love
- Producers: Kinetics & One Love

Melanie Martinez singles chronology
| "Dollhouse" (2014) | "Carousel" (2014) |

Music video
- "Dollhouse" on YouTube

"Dollhouse" is the debut single by American singer-songwriter Melanie Martinez. Written alongside production duo Kinetics & One Love, the song was released on February 10, 2014 as the lead single of her debut EP of the same name, and later featured on her debut studio album, Cry Baby (2015). Lyrically, "Dollhouse" is about a dysfunctional family, who, according to Martinez, is "hiding being a perfect plastic facade". Martinez has also stated that "Dollhouse" is a metaphor for how people view celebrities and their apparently perfect public lives.

The song was also featured in a preview for the ABC Family series Pretty Little Liars.

== Background and composition ==
"Dollhouse" was revealed to be a prequel to "Sippy Cup", another single from the Cry Baby album that is about an alcoholic mother who decides to kill her husband and his mistress, sparing only her daughter.

Lyrically, according to Martinez, the song discusses a dysfunctional family that is "hiding behind a perfect facade", while also serving as a double entendre "for how people view celebrities" and their seemingly perfect public lives.

== Music video ==
The music video for the song was directed by Nathan Scialom & Tom McNamara and uploaded on Martinez's YouTube channel on February 9, 2014. The video starts with a little girl playing with her dolls in a dollhouse. A visible doll is one that has makeup that is made to look like Martinez, who is playing the character Cry Baby in the video. The girl leaves the dollhouse, and the camera gives a closeup as the song starts. It then zooms in on Cry Baby, who is inside of the dollhouse. She sheds the light on her dysfunctional family, explaining that her father is out cheating on her mother, while her brother is smoking marijuana, as the camera pans over her mother who is passed out on the couch holding a wine bottle.

The video then shows the family dressing up so they can look perfect in public and put on the facade of being a perfect family. After this the camera shows the family sitting on the couch, watching TV. Cry Baby describes that, to the outer world, while her mother may seem perfect, she is far from it, as when her husband is out cheating on her with another woman, she drinks away her sorrows. Cry Baby then notices that the girl is coming back upstairs, and warns the other dolls to go back into the places they were in before. They do, and as the girl approaches, Cry Baby stands up. The girl smiles at her, but then Cry Baby tells the girl that her family isn't as perfect as they let on, and she turns the girl into a doll. The rest of the family begins to corner the girl, and as they approach her the girl is turned back into a human. Scared, she runs away as the dollhouse closes.

== Track listing ==
Digital download
| No. | Title | Length |
|---|---|---|
| 1. | "Dollhouse" | 3:51 |
| Total length: | | 3:51 |

Dollhouse Remixes – EP
| No. | Title | Length |
|---|---|---|
| 1. | "Dollhouse" (Kiely Rich Remix) | 6:20 |
| 2. | "Dollhouse" (One Love Remix) | 4:27 |
| 3. | "Dollhouse" (Jai Wolf Remix) | 4:08 |
| 4. | "Dollhouse" (Treasure Fingers H.O.U.S.E Remix) | 4:46 |
| Total length: | | 19:41 |

== Certifications ==
| Region | Certification | Certified units/sales |
|---|---|---|
| Canada (Music Canada) | Platinum | 80,000^{‡} |
| New Zealand (RMNZ) | Gold | 15,000^{‡} |
| Poland (ZPAV) | Gold | 25,000^{‡} |
| United Kingdom (BPI) | Gold | 400,000^{‡} |
| United States (RIAA) | 2× Platinum | 2,000,000^{‡} |
^{‡} Sales+streaming figures based on certification alone.

== Release history ==
| Region | Date | Format(s) | Label | Ref. |
|---|---|---|---|---|
| United States | February 10, 2014 | Digital download | Self-released | |
| Canada | July 24, 2014 | Remixes EP | Atlantic Records | |
| United States | July 24, 2014 | Remixes EP | Atlantic Records | |
