= Cry Baby (Melanie Martinez song) =

Song by Melanie Martinez

from the album Cry Baby
- Released: August 14, 2015
- Recorded: 2014
- Genre: Alt-pop
- Length: 3:59
- Label: Atlantic
- Songwriter(s): Melanie Martinez; Jeremy Dussolliet; Tim Sommers
- Producer(s): One Love

Music video
- "Cry Baby" on YouTube

"Cry Baby" is a song by American singer-songwriter Melanie Martinez from her (Note: Martinez uses she/her and they/them pronouns. This article uses she/her pronouns for consistency.) debut studio album of the same name (2015). The song's music video was released on March 14, 2016.

== Background and composition ==
"Cry Baby" runs for three minutes and fifty-nine seconds. The alt-pop song opens the album, creating a "spooky" atmosphere with minimalist electronic sounds and whispered lyrics.

The song is positioned in the key of F minor and runs at a tempo of 95 BPM. Although it was composed in said key, a chord progression isn't followed.

== Certifications ==
Region	Certification	Certified units/sales
Canada (Music Canada)	Gold	40,000^{‡}
United Kingdom (BPI)	Silver	200,000^{‡}
United States (RIAA)	Gold	500,000^{‡}
^{‡} Sales+streaming figures based on certification alone.
