= Fletcher discography =

Artist discography

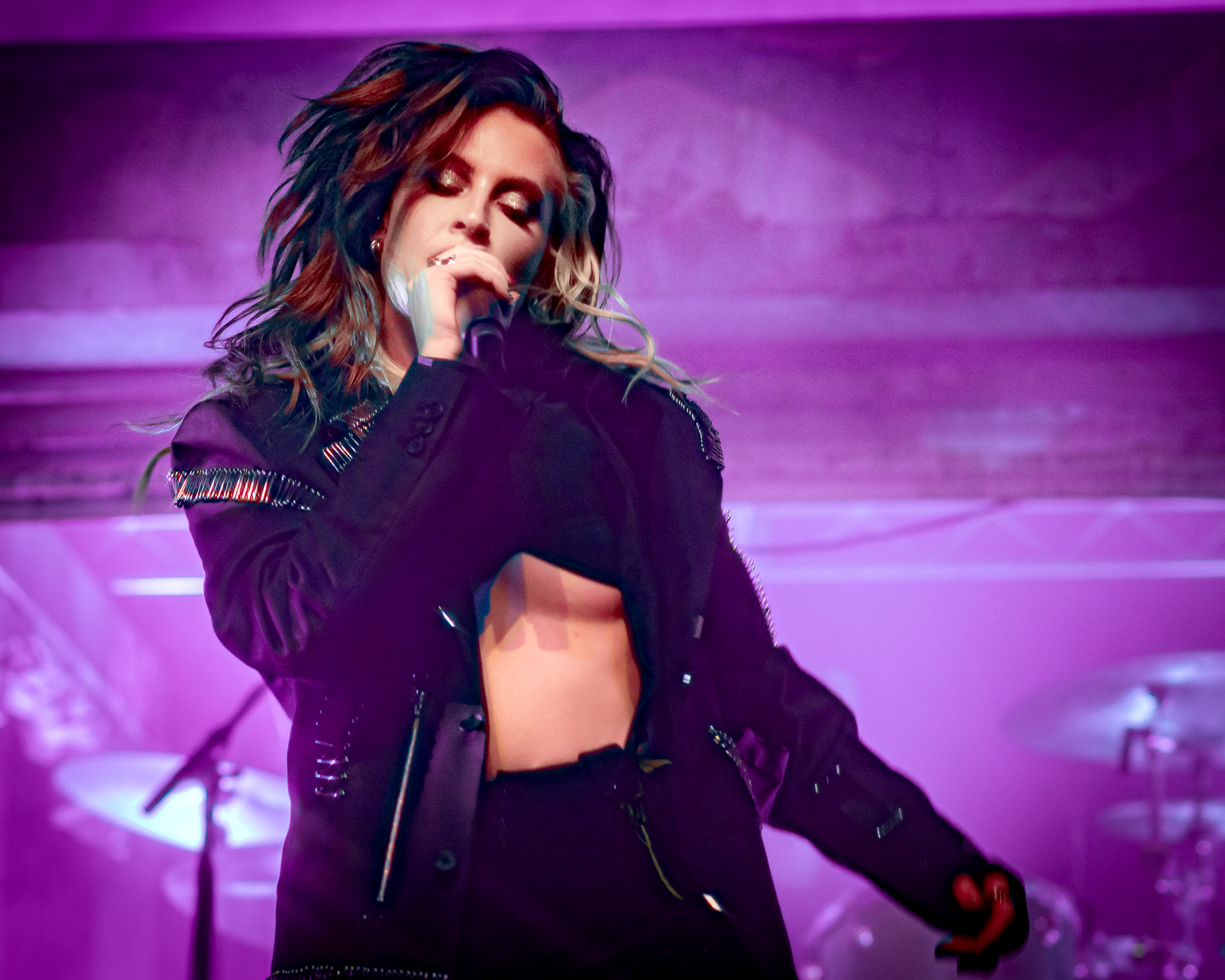
- Fletcher performing at the Fonda Theatre; March 2, 2022
- Studio albums: 3
- EPs: 3
- Live albums: 1
- Singles: 31

American pop singer Fletcher has released three studio albums, one live album, three extended plays and thirty-one singles as a lead artist.

== Studio albums ==
List of studio albums, with selected chart details and chart positions
Title	Details	Peak chart positions							
Title	Details	US	AUS	BEL (FL)	GER	IRE	NLD	NZ	UK
Girl of My Dreams	Released: September 16, 2022; Label: Capitol; Format: Digital download, streaming, vinyl, CD, cassette	15	42	16	45	77	35	9	44
In Search of the Antidote	Released: March 22, 2024; Label: Capitol, EMI	36	66	14	28	—	34	23	26
Would You Still Love Me If You Really Knew Me?	Released: July 18, 2025; Label: Capitol	—	—	29	34	—	78	—	—
"—" denotes a recording that did not chart or was not released in that territory.

== Live albums ==
List of live albums, with selected chart details and chart positions
Title	Details	Peak chart positions
Title	Details	BEL (FL)
The Antidote: Fletcher Live	Released: December 13, 2024; Label: Capitol; Format: Digital download, streaming, vinyl	190

== Extended plays ==
List of extended plays, with selected details
Title	Details
Finding Fletcher	Released: September 30, 2016; Label: Self-released; Format: Digital download
You Ruined New York City for Me	Released: August 16, 2019; Label: Capitol; Format: Digital download, vinyl
The S(ex) Tapes	Released: September 9, 2020; Label: Capitol; Format: Digital download, vinyl, cassette

== Singles ==
=== As lead artist ===
List of singles as lead artist, with selected chart positions and certifications
Title	Year	Peak chart positions						Certifications	Album
Title	Year	US	US Pop	US Rock	CAN	IRE	NZ Hot	Certifications	Album
"War Paint"	2015	—	—	—	—	—	—		Finding Fletcher
"Live Young Die Free"	2016	—	—	—	—	—	—		Finding Fletcher
"Avalanche"	2016	—	—	—	—	—	—		Finding Fletcher
"Wasted Youth"	2016	—	—	—	—	—	—		Finding Fletcher
"You Should Talk"	2017	—	—	—	—	—	—		Non-album singles
"I Believe You"	2018	—	—	—	—	—	—		Non-album singles
"Undrunk"	2019	61	16	—	83	65	33	RIAA: Platinum; MC: Gold	You Ruined New York City for Me
"If You're Gonna Lie"	2019	—	—	—	—	—	—		You Ruined New York City for Me
"About You"	2019	—	—	—	—	—	—		You Ruined New York City for Me
"One Too Many"	2019	—	—	—	—	—	—		Non-album singles
"Forever"	2020	—	—	—	—	—	—		Non-album singles
"Bitter" (featuring Kito or Trevor Daniel)	2020	—	—	—	—	—	—	RIAA: Platinum; BPI: Silver; MC: Gold	The S(ex) Tapes
"If I Hated You"	2020	—	—	—	—	—	30		The S(ex) Tapes
"Feel"	2020	—	—	—	—	—	—		The S(ex) Tapes
"The One"	2020	—	—	—	—	—	—		The S(ex) Tapes
"Last Laugh"	2020	—	—	—	—	—	—		Promising Young Woman
"On Fire Again"	2021	—	—	—	—	—	—		To All the Boys: Always and Forever
"She Said"	2021	—	—	—	—	—	—		Love, Victor
"Healing"	2021	—	—	—	—	—	32		Girl of My Dreams (Deluxe edition)
"Girls Girls Girls"	2021	—	—	—	—	—	32		Non-album singles
"Cherry" (with Hayley Kiyoko)	2021	—	—	—	—	—	—		Non-album singles
"Her Body Is Bible"	2022	—	—	—	—	—	—		Girl of My Dreams
"Becky's So Hot"	2022	—	—	31	—	—	—		Girl of My Dreams
"Sting"	2022	—	—	—	—	—	21		Girl of My Dreams
"Better Version"	2022	—	—	—	—	—	—		Girl of My Dreams
"Suckerpunch"	2022	—	—	—	—	—	31		Girl of My Dreams (Deluxe edition)
"Silent Night"	2022	—	—	—	—	—	—		Non-album single
"Eras of Us"	2023	—	—	—	—	—	21		In Search of the Antidote
"Lead Me On"	2024	—	32	—	—	—	—		In Search of the Antidote
"Doing Better"	2024	—	—	—	—	—	22		In Search of the Antidote
"Boy"	2025	—	—	—	—	—	—		Would You Still Love Me If You Really Knew Me?
"—" denotes a recording that did not chart or was not released in that territory.

=== As featured artist ===
Title	Year	Album
"Arcade" (Duncan Laurence featuring Fletcher)	2020	Small Town Boy
"Another Life" (Surf Mesa featuring Fletcher and Josh Golden)	2021	Non-album singles
"Sauna" (Rio Arya featuring Fletcher)	2021	Non-album singles
"Butterflies" (MAX featuring Fletcher)	2021	Non-album singles
"Bitch Back" (Olivia O'Brien featuring Fletcher)	2022	Bitch Back

== Guest appearances ==
List of non-single guest appearances, with other performing artists, showing year released and album name
Title	Year	Other artist(s)	Album
"Lover"	2020	Niall Horan	Spotify Singles

== Other charted songs ==
List of other charted songs, with selected chart positions
Title	Year	Peak chart positions	Album
Title	Year	NZ Hot	Album
"Guess We Lied..."	2022	39	Girl of My Dreams
"Serial Heartbreaker"	2022	25	Girl of My Dreams
