= Young Bombs =

Canadian electronic dance music duo

- Origin: Vancouver, Canada
- Genres: EDM; Dance
- Years active: 2014–present
- Labels: Astralwerks; Sony Music Canada
- Members: Tristan Norton; Martin Kottmeier
- Website: www.youngbombs.com

Young Bombs are a Canadian electronic music duo composed of DJ/producers Tristan Norton and Martin Kottmeier. Starting in 2014, the pair began working on remixes for acts like The Chainsmokers, Lady Gaga, Billie Eilish, Galantis, and numerous others. In 2019, they began releasing original music for the first time with the single, "Starry Eyes", which reached No. 31 on the Dance Club Songs chart.

== History ==
Tristan Norton and Martin Kottmeier are both natives of Vancouver, British Columbia and met while playing in different bands in high school. The two began making music together and eventually moved to Los Angeles to form part of the backing band for a pop artist. They moved back to Vancouver some time after and began writing jingles, including one for Pizza Hut. The two also initially wanted to form an indie rock band. The name "Young Bombs" comes from a short-lived band they formed with another friend. The two decided to focus on EDM after Kottmeier took an interest in the genre.

In 2014, the two released various remixes of songs by acts like Galantis ("You"), Cazzette ("Sleepless"), and Sigma ("Nobody to Love"), among others. In 2015, Young Bombs played their first live show, opening for The Chainsmokers at New City Gas in Montreal. That year, they also continued releasing remixes, including those for Nick Jonas ("Teacher"), Secondcity ("I Wanna Feel"), and Fletcher ("War Paint"). In 2016, the pair played in Las Vegas for the first time, again opening up for The Chainsmokers at Hakkasan. New remixes that year included those for acts like Billie Eilish ("Ocean Eyes"), Troye Sivan ("Wild"), and Rozes ("Burn Wild"), among others.

In 2017, Young Bombs played numerous festivals, including Lollapalooza, the Firefly Music Festival and the Shaky Beats Music Festival. They also released remixes of songs by Lady Gaga ("The Cure") and Selena Gomez ("Kill Em with Kindness") among others. In November 2017, the duo released a 7-minute spoof of the Netflix series, Stranger Things, entitled, Stranger Bombs. The video featured cameos from Shaun Frank and The Chainsmokers' Alex Pall and also included portions of the Young Bombs' remix of Alan Walker's "Faded".

In 2018, the duo played at the Life Is Beautiful Music & Art Festival. They also released remixes for The Chainsmokers ("This Feeling" featuring Kelsea Ballerini), Bazzi ("Mine"), and Weezer ("Say It Ain't So").

After years of making successful remixes, Young Bombs wanted a change. They explained, "As an artist, you want a song to be your own and have your fans connect with your creations." In March 2019, the duo released its first original single, "Starry Eyes" which reached No. 20 on the Canada Top 40 Chart. It was also the first recording they released after signing to Astralwerks. Young Bombs released a second song, "Don't Let Them", in May 2019. They released the single "Better Day" featuring Aloe Blacc in October 2019 which reached No. 16 on the Canada Top 40 chart, becoming their highest-charting single yet. Young Bombs shared that Aloe was their first choice to feature on the song, which they say has a "universal message" that listeners everywhere can connect with.

That year, the duo also played the main stage at the Ultra Music Festival in Miami. As of April 2019, Young Bombs have released around 85 remixes.

In October 2020, Young Bombs released their debut EP "The Young Bombs Show" featuring new single, "Wrong Side of Love" with Darius Rucker.

In 2021, they received a Juno Award nomination at the Juno Awards of 2021, for Breakthrough Group of the Year.

In 2023, Young Bombs released the single "Let You Down" (featuring Deza).

In 2026, they released the single "Kuya" with Swedish DJ ERIICE.

== Discography ==
=== Extended plays ===
List of extended plays, with selected chart positions
| Title | Details | | | |
| Title | Details | Canada Top 40 | US Dance Club Songs | US Mix Show Airplay |
|---|---|---|---|---|
| The Young Bombs Show | Released: 23 October 2020; Label: Astralwerks; Format: Digital download | — | — | — |

=== Singles ===
| Year | Single | Peak chart positions | | | Certifications | Album |
| Year | Single | CAN CHR | US Dance Club Songs | US Mix Show Airplay | Certifications | Album |
|---|---|---|---|---|---|---|
| 2019 | "Starry Eyes" | 20 | 31 | — | | The Young Bombs Show |
| 2019 | "Don't Let Them" | — | — | 15 | | The Young Bombs Show |
| 2019 | "Loyal" (featuring GiGi) | — | — | — | | The Young Bombs Show |
| 2019 | "Where the Shadow Ends" (with Banners) | — | — | — | | Where the Shadow Ends |
| 2019 | "Better Day" (featuring Aloe Blacc) | 16 | 26 | 30 | MC: Gold | The Young Bombs Show |
| 2020 | "High Road" (featuring Robinson) | — | — | — | | The Young Bombs Show |
| 2020 | "Wrong Side of Love" (featuring Darius Rucker) | — | — | — | | The Young Bombs Show |
| 2021 | "Summer In Brooklyn" (featuring Jordy) | 23 | — | — | | Non-album singles |
| 2021 | "U Up?" (featuring Stondon Massey) | — | — | — | | Non-album singles |
| 2022 | "Kinda Funny" (featuring Audrey Mika) | — | — | — | | Non-album singles |
| 2022 | "We Own the Night" | — | — | — | | Non-album singles |
| 2022 | "Key to My Heart" | — | — | — | | Non-album singles |
| 2023 | "Bad" (featuring Discrete and Alex Hosking) | — | — | — | | Non-album singles |
| 2023 | "Let You Down" (featuring Deza) | — | — | — | | Non-album singles |
| 2023 | "Magnets in the Dark" (featuring Lizzy Land) | — | — | — | | Non-album singles |
| 2023 | "Strangers" (featuring Linney) | — | — | — | | Non-album singles |
| 2024 | "All My Love" (featuring Bryn Christopher) | — | — | — | | Non-album singles |
| 2025 | "Be Mine" (with Marco Generani) | — | — | — | | Non-album singles |
| 2026 | "Vele" | — | — | — | | Non-album singles |
| 2026 | "Kuya" (with ERIICE) | — | — | — | | Non-album singles |
| 2026 | "Fire" / "Izindaba" | — | — | — | | Non-album singles |
"—" denotes a recording that did not chart or was not released.

=== Select remixes ===
List of remixes with selected details
| Title | Year | Original artist |
|---|---|---|
| "You" | 2014 | Galantis |
| "Sleepless" | 2014 | Cazzette |
| "My Love" | 2014 | Route 94 (feat. Jess Glynne) |
| "Boom Clap" | 2014 | Charli XCX |
| "Nobody to Love" | 2014 | Sigma |
| "I Wanna Feel" | 2015 | Secondcity |
| "Compass" | 2015 | Zella Day |
| "America" | 2015 | Xylø |
| "Weekend Millionaires" | 2015 | Katelyn Tarver |
| "Teacher" | 2015 | Nick Jonas |
| "War Paint" | 2015 | Fletcher |
| "Paradise in You" | 2015 | Radical Something |
| "Faded" | 2016 | Alan Walker (feat. Iselin Solheim) |
| "Wild" | 2016 | Troye Sivan (feat. Alessia Cara) |
| "Burn Wild" | 2016 | Rozes |
| "Dance with Me" | 2016 | Kelly Clarkson |
| "Wild Things" | 2016 | Alessia Cara |
| "High" | 2016 | Jesper Jenset |
| "Ocean Eyes" | 2016 | Billie Eilish |
| "Whole Heart" | 2016 | Gryffin (feat. Bipolar Sunshine) |
| "The Cure" | 2017 | Lady Gaga |
| "Kill Em with Kindness" | 2017 | Selena Gomez |
| "Glory" | 2017 | Bastille |
| "Mine" | 2018 | Bazzi |
| "This Feeling" | 2018 | The Chainsmokers (feat. Kelsea Ballerini) |
| "Say It Ain't So" | 2018 | Weezer |
| "head first" | 2020 | Christian French |
| "Forever" | 2023 | Gryffin (feat. Elley Duhé) |

== Awards and nominations ==
| Year | Awards | Category | Nominee / work | Result |
|---|---|---|---|---|
| 2021 | Juno Award | Breakthrough Group of the Year | Young Bombs | Nominated |
