= Caroline Pennell =

American singer-songwriter

Carol Ades
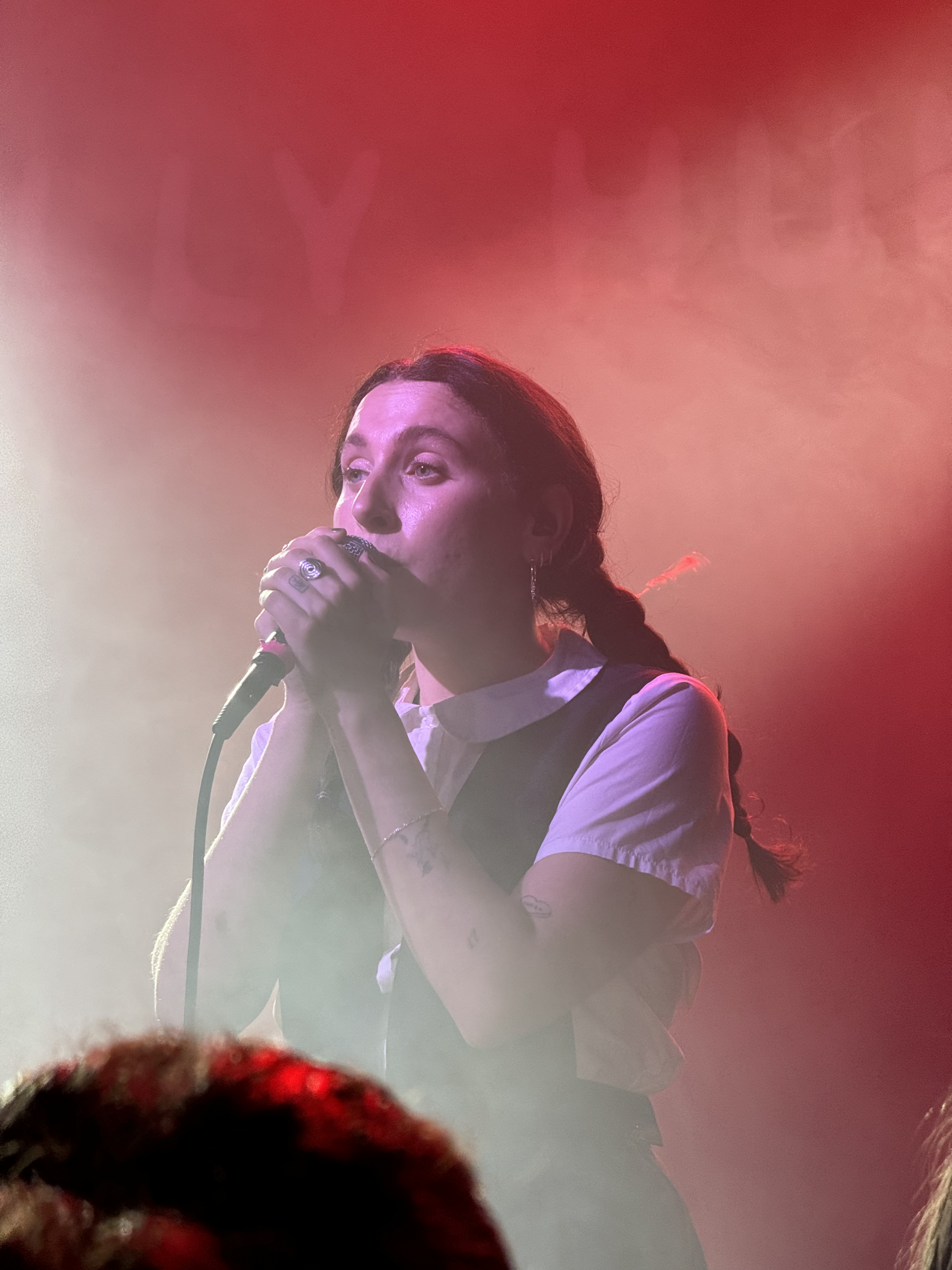
- Pennell performing in 2024

Background information
- Born: Caroline Ades Pennell; December 27, 1995 (age 30); Saddle River, New Jersey, U.S.
- Genres: Indie pop, indie folk
- Occupation: Singer-songwriter
- Instruments: Vocals, piano, guitar
- Years active: 2012–present
- Label: Nettwerk
- Website: carolades.com

Caroline Ades Pennell, also known by her stage name Carol Ades, is an American singer and songwriter. She gained recognition as a contestant at the fifth season of the United States version of the reality singing competition The Voice.

== Career ==
=== On The Voice ===
Pennell was 17 when she auditioned for the fifth season of the American series of The Voice. She turned the chairs of CeeLo Green and Blake Shelton with her blind audition singing Ellie Goulding's "Anything Could Happen." She chose Green to be her coach.

In the "battle rounds", Pennell battled and won against Anthony Paul, singing "As Long As You Love Me" by Justin Bieber. In the "knockout round", she faced George Horga, Jr. She chose to sing Ingrid Michaelson's "The Way I Am," and won once again. In the "Live Rounds", she sang "We're Going to Be Friends" by The White Stripes and won the majority in the public vote. In the Top 10, she sang "Leaving on a Jet Plane" and landed in the bottom three. Before voting in the "Instant Save" system, (Voting to pick one contestant in the bottom three to move forward) Pennell and Tessanne Chin performed Lorde's "Royals". Pennell was predicted to be the underdog in the bottom three, but after her performance, she received 80% of the Twitter votes and moved on to the Top 8. The next week, she sang "Dog Days Are Over" by Florence and The Machine, and again landed in the bottom three. Matthew Schuler was picked on Twitter by the "Instant Save," ending Pennell's time as a contestant.

Stage	Song	Original Artist	Date	Order	Result
Blind Audition	"Anything Could Happen"	Ellie Goulding	September 23, 2013	1.2	Two chairs turned Joined Team Cee-lo
Battle Rounds (Top 48)	"As Long as You Love Me" (vs. Anthony Paul)	Justin Bieber	October 14, 2013	7.1	Advanced
Knockout Rounds (Top 32)	"The Way I Am" (vs. George Horga, Jr.)	Ingrid Michaelson	October 29, 2013	12.7	Advanced
Live Playoffs (Top 20)	"We're Going to Be Friends"	The White Stripes	November 5, 2013	14.5	Safe
Live Top 12	"Wake Me Up"	Avicii	November 11, 2013	16.1	Safe
Live Top 10	"Leaving on a Jet Plane"	Peter Paul and Mary	November 18, 2013	18.4	Bottom Three; Instant Save
Live Top 8	"Dog Days Are Over"	Florence and the Machine	November 25, 2013	20.3	Bottom Three; Eliminated

Non-competition performances
Stage	Song	Original Artist	Date	Order
Top 12	"Give a Little Bit" (with CeeLo Green, Kat Robichaud, Jonny Gray, Amber Nicole, and Tamara Chauniece)	Supertramp	November 6, 2013	15.2
Live Top 12 Results	"Roam" (with CeeLo Green, Kat Robichaud, and Jonny Gray)	The B-52's	November 12, 2013	17.2
Live Top 10 Results	"Royals" (with Tessanne Chin)	Lorde	November 19, 2013	19.4
Live Top 8 Performances	"Lego House" (with Jacquie Lee, James Wolpert, and Matthew Schuler)	Ed Sheeran	November 25, 2013	20.3
Finals	"Bohemian Rhapsody" (with Jacquie Lee, Cole Vosbury, James Wolpert and Matthew Schuler)	Queen	December 17, 2013	27.2
Finals	"Wagon Wheel" (with Will Champlin, Cole Vosbury, Austin Jenckes and Jonny Gray)	Old Crow Medicine Show	November 26, 2013	27.6

=== Nettwerk Music Group ===
Pennell announced that she would join the Nettwerk Music Group. She was featured on the album From Cover to Cover: 30 Years at Nettwerk. Her version of Coldplay's "Yellow" was one of the most downloaded songs from the album.

=== Other appearances ===
In addition to Coldplay's "Yellow", Pennell has also covered "Come and Get It" from the movie The Magic Christian, a song written by Paul McCartney. Her performance was featured as one of the five songs on Music for Linda, produced by Paul McCartney, sold to raise funds for Women and Cancer Fund.

She was featured on Bassjackers and Lucas and Steve's song "These Heights".

== Personal life ==
As of 2022, Pennell resides in Los Angeles. She is queer.

== Discography ==
=== As Carol Ades ===
==== Studio albums ====
Title	Details
Late Start	Released: September 27, 2024; Label: Independent

==== Extended plays ====
Title	Details
Through	Released: October 29, 2021; Label: Independent
Sadtown USA	Released: December 9, 2022; Label: Independent
Worst Person in the World	Released: March 6, 2026; Label: Forge Records

==== Singles ====
Title	Year	Album
"I Can't Wait to Be British"	2021	Through
"Crying During Sex"	2021	Through
"Unlearn Me"	2021	Through
"26"	2022	Non-album singles
"Before the Night Is Over" (with Kristiane)	2022	Non-album singles
"Sadtown USA"	2022	Sadtown USA
"Special"	2022	Sadtown USA
"First Christmas"	2022	Non-album singles
"All Time Low"	2023	Non-album singles
"Free"	2023	Non-album singles
"Better Than You Found Me"	2024	Late Start
"Hope Is a Scary Thing"	2024	Late Start
"Dreams"	2024	Late Start
"Late Start"	2024	Late Start
"Never Fucking Fall in Love Again"	2024	Late Start
"Good Swimmer"	2025	Non-album single
"Worst Person in the World"	2025	Worst Person in the World
"Merry Go Round"	2025	Worst Person in the World
"Turns Out I'm Amazing"	2026	Worst Person in the World
"Normal Feelings"	2026	Worst Person in the World
"That's My Girl"	2026	Worst Person in the World
"Familiar Hell"	2026	Worst Person in the World

=== As Caroline Pennell ===
==== Extended plays ====
Title	Details
The Race	Released: January 13, 2013; Label: Independent; Formats: Digital download
December Songs	Released: November 4, 2016; Label: Nettwerk
Phases	Released: January 12, 2018; Label: Nettwerk
Blue	Released: May 22, 2020; Label: Nettwerk

==== Singles ====
Title	Year	Album
"Follow the Sun"	2016	Non-album singles
"Say It in the Silence"	2016	Non-album singles
"Hallelujah"	2016	Non-album singles
"Lovesick" (featuring Felix Snow)	2016	Phases
"Drive Me Home"	2017	Phases
"Blue"	2018	Blue

=== Songwriting credits ===
Title	Year	Artist(s)	Album
"Stuck" (with Tove Styrke)	2018	Lost Kings	Paper Crowns
"Would I"	2018	Maggie Lindemann	Non-album single
"Favorite Part of Me"	2019	Astrid S	Down Low
"I Don't Like You"	2019	Grace VanderWaal	Letters Vol. 1
"Invisible"	2019	Zara Larsson	Klaus: Original Motion Picture Soundtrack
"Never Fucking Fall in Love Again"	2019	X Lovers	Virgin
"Yours"	2020	Jesse McCartney	Non-album single
"Tension"	2020	Dagny	Strangers / Lovers
"Past Life"	2020	Trevor Daniel and Selena Gomez	Nicotine
"Under / Over"	2020	Gracie Abrams	Minor
"Shh...Don't Say It"	2020	Fletcher	The S(ex) Tapes
"It's Okay If You Forget Me"	2020	Astrid S	Leave It Beautiful
"I Don't Know Why" (with NOTD)	2020	Astrid S	Leave It Beautiful
"Geen traan"	2020	Glennis Grace	Non-album single
"Fuckedupminddd"	2020	Lauren Aquilina	Ghost World
"Best Friend"	2020	Lauren Aquilina	Ghost World
"What Do I Call You"	2020	Taeyeon	What Do I Call You
"Your Name Hurts"	2020	Hailee Steinfeld	Half Written Story
"You"	2021	Benny Blanco with Marshmello and Vance Joy	Friends Keep Secrets 2
"Sin x Secret"	2021	Charlotte Lawrence	Charlotte
"Telling Myself"	2021	Joshua Bassett	Joshua Bassett
"The Art of Starting Over"	2021	Demi Lovato	Dancing with the Devil... the Art of Starting Over
"Lonely People"	2021	Demi Lovato	Dancing with the Devil... the Art of Starting Over
"The Way You Don't Look at Me"	2021	Demi Lovato	Dancing with the Devil... the Art of Starting Over
"Carefully"	2021	Demi Lovato	Dancing with the Devil... the Art of Starting Over
"The Kind of Lover I Am"	2021	Demi Lovato	Dancing with the Devil... the Art of Starting Over
"California Sober"	2021	Demi Lovato	Dancing with the Devil... the Art of Starting Over
"Butterfly"	2021	Demi Lovato	Dancing with the Devil... the Art of Starting Over
"EveryTime I Cry"	2021	Ava Max	Non-album single
"He Loves Me, But..."	2021	Sofia Carson	Sofia Carson
"Under"	2021	Chelsea Cutler	When I Close My Eyes
"Sims"	2021	Corook	Achoo!
"Two Tears in a Bucket"	2022	Sofia Carson	Sofia Carson
"Sex Not Violence"	2022	Yungblud	Yungblud
"Halfway"	2022	Ber	Halfway
"All I Need Is You"	2023	Kesha	Gag Order
"Hate Me Harder"	2023	Kesha	Gag Order
"Cry Over Everything"	2023	Charli Adams	Nothing to Be Scared Of
"Punisher"	2023	K.Flay	Mono
"People"	2023	Half Alive	Persona
"I Told You So"	2024	Briston Maroney	Non-album single
"Look How Far You've Come"	2024	Joshua Bassett	The Golden Years
"Tonight I Might"	2024	Katseye	SIS (Soft Is Strong)
"Adored"	2024	Paris Hilton	Infinite Icon
"I'm Not a Machine"	2024	Bishop Briggs	Tell My Therapist I'm Fine
"30 Something"	2025	Nao	Jupiter
"Death"	2025	Corook	Committed to a Bit
"Red Flag"	2025	Kesha	Period
"Fashion"	2025	Michael Clifford	Sidequest
"Kiss My Neck"	2025	Mimi Webb	Confessions
"If My Heart Was a House"	2025	Jade	That's Showbiz Baby! The Encore
