= Past Life (Trevor Daniel song) =

2020 single by Trevor Daniel and Selena Gomez

Single by Trevor Daniel and Selena Gomez

from the album Nicotine
- Released: June 26, 2020
- Length: 3:04 (duo version); 3:01 (solo version)
- Label: Alamo; Interscope
- Songwriters: Trevor Daniel; Finneas O'Connell; Sean Myer; Caroline Pennell; Mick Coogan; Jay Stolar
- Producers: Finneas; Sean Myer

Trevor Daniel singles chronology
"Forgot" (2019)	"Past Life" (2020)	"Bitter" (2020)

Selena Gomez singles chronology
"Boyfriend" (2020)	"Past Life" (2020)	"Ice Cream" (2020)

Music video
- "Past Life" on YouTube

"Past Life" is a song by American singer Trevor Daniel. It was written by Daniel, Finneas O'Connell, Caroline Pennell, Jay Stolar, Mick Coogan and Sean Myer, with production handled by O'Connell and Sean Myer. The song was released by Alamo Records and Interscope Records on March 6, 2020, as single for his album Nicotine (2020). An official remix with American singer Selena Gomez was released on June 26, 2020. Idolator describe the song as a "looming summer smash". Another remix adding American rapper Lil Mosey as a featured artist was released on July 31, 2020.

== Music video ==
The music video for "Past Life" was directed by Vania Heymann and Gal Muggia and was officially released on July 14, 2020.

== Commercial performance ==
On the Billboard Hot 100, the song debuted and peaked at number 77, becoming Daniel's second chart entry on the chart. The song also entered charts in Canada and Hungary peaking at number 68 and number 38 respectively.

== Live performances ==
On August 18, 2020, Daniel performed a solo version of the song in a medley with "Falling" on The Tonight Show with Jimmy Fallon.

== Charts ==
Chart performance for "Past Life"
Chart (2020–2021)	Peak position
Canada Hot 100 (Billboard)	68
Canada CHR/Top 40 (Billboard)	16
Canada Hot AC (Billboard)	30
Croatia International Airplay (Top lista)	94
Greece International (IFPI)	94
Hungary (Single Top 40)	38
Ireland (IRMA)	89
Lithuania (AGATA)	88
Mexico Ingles Airplay (Billboard)	26
New Zealand Hot Singles (RMNZ)	5
Slovakia Airplay (ČNS IFPI)	32
UK Singles Downloads (Official Charts)	79
US Billboard Hot 100	77
US Adult Pop Airplay (Billboard)	20
US Pop Airplay (Billboard)	15
US Rolling Stone Top 100	76

== Certifications ==
Certifications for "Past Life"
Region	Certification	Certified units/sales
Brazil (Pro-Música Brasil)	Gold	20,000^{‡}
Canada (Music Canada)	Platinum	80,000^{‡}
New Zealand (RMNZ)	Gold	15,000^{‡}
United States (RIAA)	Gold	500,000^{‡}
^{‡} Sales+streaming figures based on certification alone.

== Release history ==
Release dates and formats for "Past Life"
Region	Date	Format	Label(s)	Ref.
Various	June 26, 2020	Digital download; streaming	Alamo; Interscope	
Australia	June 26, 2020	Contemporary hit radio	Universal	
Italy	July 3, 2020	Contemporary hit radio	Universal	
United States	July 14, 2020	Contemporary hit radio	Interscope	
United States	July 14, 2020	Rhythmic contemporary	Interscope	
United States	August 3, 2020	Hot adult contemporary	Interscope	
