= Klaus (soundtrack) =

Klaus (Music from the Netflix Film)

Film score by Alfonso González Aguilar
- Released: 20 December 2019
- Recorded: 2014–2019
- Genre: Film score
- Length: 57:49
- Label: Epic
- Producer: Alfonso González Aguilar

Alfonso González Aguilar chronology
| Get Her... If You Can (2019) | Klaus (2019) | Sonho de Aline (2020) |

Klaus (Music from the Netflix Film) is the soundtrack album to the 2019 film Klaus directed by Sergio Pablos. The original score is composed by Alfonso González Aguilar and featured 34 tracks, along with an original song "Invisible" performed by Zara Larsson. The album was released through Epic Records on 20 December 2019. Aguilar won the World Soundtrack Award – Public Choice.

== Development ==
The film score is composed by Alfonso González Aguilar who worked with Sergio Pablos on the score for five years since 2014. On writing the film's music, Aguilar tried to get into each character when he read the script and what should be the color of the characters, which he would place them all along the film, spotting the start and end point of the film. Aguilar considered the story was "very evolving", hence the idea was to create "something very unique in terms of sound and very dark [or gray]" and in the end, "something very, very colorful and happy, and much more textures in terms of harmonies and in terms of melodies".

Aguilar noted that he intended to write music to give that color, but he had provided the black-and-white animatics, hence, he had to imagine the colors for the film. Aguilar then created the mockups, main structure and themes, which he found it "incredible" when he saw the updated animatics with the color, afterwards he rearranged it to match the music to those colors. Aguilar wanted the music to be as good as the 2D animation and something distinguishable.

The musical piece for Jesper had an "easy, selfish sound" in the beginning, as the character thinks about himself; it was "the sort of cue you'd hear on the radio with guitars". After achieving the sound, he expands into a musical score with cues which were blended throughout the film. The theme cue which he composed when Jesper meet Klaus, had Jesper's theme blended when Klaus is in the town. He further blended the harmonies and mixed familiar cues that are heard earlier in the film, which was further expanded into an orchestra as Jesper transformed into being a better man and the sound palette becomes "colorful".

While composing the main theme, the audiences know that they were watching a Christmas film, but the music soon changes to reflect the narrative; Aguilar stated that the team were making a Christmas film which was not about Christmas, but a "story about friendship, emotions and letters". The first musical piece heard in the film was Christmas bells as he need to set up for the audience which was a film about Santa, but he is not Santa till the end. But, in the end, "we have Christmas and everyone loves it, but for me the challenge was setting up all the bases so you arrive at that moment of why we are living Christmas today." Aguilar noted that the much difficult cue to write was where Jesper and the children in Smeerensburg started to evolve, which took him 43 attempts to write. The score was recorded at the Vienna Synchron Stage.

The film also featured two pop songs: "Invisible" by Zara Larsson and "How You Like Me Now?" by The Heavy. The song "Invisible" was recorded specifically for the film, written by Larsson, Justin Tranter, Aguilar, Caroline Pennell and Jussi Karvinen.

== Reception ==
Konstantinos Sotiropoulos of Soundtrack Beat wrote "The fact that the movie "Klaus" is an excellent film proposal for Christmas time – a proposal that seems destined to become a classic in the years to come – is to a great extent due to the composer Alfonso G. Aguilar. His music has something to say at its every moment. It wants to cause something to the viewer. It is the kind of music that the cinema needs, music that can mobilize our inner world." John DeFore of The Hollywood Reporter wrote "Klaus' biggest missteps are in the three scenes where music in contemporary genres muddies the timeless atmosphere. Though never very distracting, these music cues will be sore thumbs if, as could conceivably happen, Klaus becomes something families find themselves watching decades from now." David Ehrlich of IndieWire wrote "Ill-fitting pop songs (one emulating "Frozen," the other "The Grinch") undermine the timeless aesthetic at key moments". Samuel Capper of Arctic Relations called it "a wonderful score from Alfonso Aguilar".

== Track listing ==
| No. | Title | Length |
|---|---|---|
| 1. | "The Legend of Klaus" (Suite) | 9:54 |
| 2. | "A Story About Letters" | 1:38 |
| 3. | "I've Got Someone Covering for Me" | 1:03 |
| 4. | "Good Job!" | 0:17 |
| 5. | "Welcome to Smeerensburg" | 1:42 |
| 6. | "The Battle Bell" | 0:46 |
| 7. | "Heading North" | 0:43 |
| 8. | "The Woodman" | 1:34 |
| 9. | "The First Letter" | 1:29 |
| 10. | "Nice Breaking and Entering" | 0:26 |
| 11. | "The Toy Frog" | 0:44 |
| 12. | "That's Totally Normal" | 1:35 |
| 13. | "Wind" | 0:44 |
| 14. | "Tradition" | 1:16 |
| 15. | "The Awesome Klaus" | 1:08 |
| 16. | "Rodeo" | 0:58 |
| 17. | "Go Reindeer" | 0:27 |
| 18. | "Don't Mess with the Postman" | 0:18 |
| 19. | "Changes" | 3:13 |
| 20. | "Ambush" | 0:56 |
| 21. | "Truce" | 1:10 |
| 22. | "Silhouette" | 0:57 |
| 23. | "Wait, Don't Touch That" | 1:08 |
| 24. | "The Young Klaus and Lydia" | 1:53 |
| 25. | "Look What You've Done" | 2:20 |
| 26. | "Klaus Family" | 0:58 |
| 27. | "Jesper Unveiled" | 1:51 |
| 28. | "Way Back Home" | 2:49 |
| 29. | "A Nice Big Piñata" | 1:27 |
| 30. | "Gifts Downhill" | 2:11 |
| 31. | "Walk of Evil" | 0:43 |
| 32. | "A True Act of Good Will, Always Sparks Another" | 2:18 |
| 33. | "I'm Coming Love" | 2:17 |
| 34. | "Once a Year, I Get to See My Friend" | 2:05 |
| 35. | "Invisible" (End Title from Klaus) (Zara Larsson) | 2:51 |
| Total length: | | 57:49 |

== Accolades ==
Accolades received by Klaus (film)
| Award | Date of ceremony | Category | Recipient(s) | Result | Ref. |
|---|---|---|---|---|---|
| Goya Awards | 25 January 2020 | Best Original Song | "Invisible" Jussi Ilmari Karvinen, Alfonso González Aguilar, Zara Larsson, Caroline Pennell, Justin Tranter (songwriters), Zara Larsson (performer), Jussifer (producer) | Nominated | |
| Hollywood Music in Media Awards | 29 January 2020 | Best Original Song – Animated Film | "Invisible" Jussi Ilmari Karvinen, Alfonso González Aguilar, Zara Larsson, Caroline Pennell, Justin Tranter (songwriters), Zara Larsson (performer), Jussifer (producer) | Nominated | |
| Quirino Awards | 27 June 2020 | Best Sound Design and Original Music | Gabriel Gutiérrez, Alfonso González Aguilar | Nominated | |
| World Soundtrack Awards | 24 October 2020 | Public Choice Award | Alfonso González Aguilar | Won | |
