= Shannon Beveridge =

American YouTuber

- Born: Dallas, Texas, United States

YouTube information
- Channel: nowthisisliving
- Years active: 2009–present
- Genres: comedy; vlog
- Subscribers: 675 thousand
- Views: 100 million

Shannon Beveridge is the host of 'Alphabet Club Podcast,' a photographer, and a director. In 2017, she won the best LGBTQ+ YouTube Channel at the 9th Shorty Awards and the LGBT+ Celebrity Rising Star Award at the 2017 British LGBT Awards. In 2019, she directed her first music video for Alyson Stoner's single "Stripped Bare." In 2024, she shot the single cover for Ariana Grande's "The Boy Is Mine."

== Early life ==
Beveridge was born in Dallas, Texas.

== Career ==
Beveridge first rose to prominence on her YouTube channel nowthisisliving. Many of the videos posed on her YouTube channel are about LGBTQ+ topics. Her former girlfriend Cammie Scott was often featured in her videos. On July 1, 2016, they posted a video channel explaining their breakup, which has received over 3.4 million views.

Beveridge went on the "Love Is Love" tour with Miles McKenna and Rebecca Black in 2017. In 2017, Beveridge starred in the music video for her former girlfriend Fletcher's single "Wasted Youth." Fletcher's 2020 EP The S(ex) Tapes tells the aftermath of their breakup. She filmed and directed music videos for Fletcher's EP The S(ex) Tapes, including "Sex (With My Ex), which she also starred in. In July 2022, Fletcher released the single "Becky's So Hot" about Beveridge's new girlfriend, Becky Missal.

Beveridge worked with her close friend, singer-songwriter Zolita, for a music video trilogy in 2021 and 2022. She played Zolita's high school cheerleading coach in "Somebody I Fucked Once," and was the creative director for "Single in September" and "I Fucking Love You."

In 2024, Beveridge launched the podcast "exes and o's" about queer relationships and sex. The podcast has included a range of LGBT guests, including Nikki Hiltz, PeachPRC, Tegan and Sara, as well as her ex-girlfriend Fletcher.

== Personal life ==
Beveridge was born in Dallas, Texas and lived in Norman, Oklahoma while attending the University of Oklahoma before moving to her current home in Los Angeles. She graduated from the University of Oklahoma with a bachelor's degree in Finance and was in the Delta Delta Delta sorority. She dated fellow YouTuber Cammie Scott from November 2012 to May 2016. From 2016 to 2020, Beveridge dated singer-songwriter Fletcher. From 2021 to 2023, she dated LA-influencer Becky Missal.

In July 2024, Beveridge posted on Instagram that she was dating LA-influencer Becca Moore. The two announced their breakup on an episode of the For The Girls podcast released in December 2024. Beveridge has been dating content creator and television host Tefi Pessoa since early 2025.

== Awards ==
Year	Award	Category	Result
2016	British LGBT Awards	Outstanding Contribution to LGBT+ Life	Nominated
2017	British LGBT Awards	LGBT Celebrity Rising Star Award	Won
2017	Shorty Awards	LGBTQ+ YouTube Channel Award	Won

== Videography ==
*List does not include personal and/or collaborative YouTube videos.

=== Directing and filming ===
==== Music videos ====
Year	Video	Artist	Credit	Ref.
2019	"Stripped Bare"	Alyson Stoner	Director	
2020	"Bitter"	Fletcher featuring Kito	Director, producer, and editor	
2020	"Forever (Stripped)"	Fletcher	Director and producer	
2020	"If I Hated You"	Fletcher	Director and cinematographer	
2020	"The One"	Fletcher	Director and cinematographer	
2020	"Feel (A Cappella)"	Fletcher	Director and cinematographer	
2020	"Shh...Don't Say It"	Fletcher	Director and cinematographer	
2020	"Silence"	Fletcher	Director and cinematographer	
2020	"Sex (With My Ex)"	Fletcher	Director and cinematographer	
2020	"vicious"	Tate McRae, ft. Lil Mosey	Director	
2021	"Pool House"	Kevin Burke	Director	
2022	"Single in September"	Zolita	Creative director	
2022	"I F*cking Love You"	Zolita	Creative director	
2022	"Ruin My Life"	Zolita	Creative director	
2023	"Crazy Ex"	Zolita	Creative director	
2024	"Bloodstream"	Zolita	Creative director	

=== Acting ===
Year	Video	Role	Notes	Ref.
2016	"Piece of Cake"	Jessie	Short film: Ella Lentini (director)	
2017	"Wasted Youth"	Self	Music video: Fletcher	
2020	"If I Hated You"	Self	Music video: Fletcher	
2020	"Sex (With My Ex)"	Self	Music video: Fletcher	
2021	"Somebody I F*cked Once"	Unnamed coach	Music video: Zolita	
