= Trevor Daniel (singer) =

American singer (born 1994)

- Born: Trevor Daniel Neill; September 28, 1994 (age 31); Houston, Texas, U.S.
- Origin: Houston, Texas, U.S.
- Genres: Pop; R&B; hip hop; electropop; pop rock
- Occupations: Singer; songwriter
- Years active: 2017–present
- Labels: Independent (current); Internet Money; Interscope; Alamo; RCA; Fearless Records/TLNTD Records, LLC. (former)
- Website: trevordanielofficial.com

Trevor Daniel Neill (born September 28, 1994) is an American singer and songwriter. He rose to prominence with his 2018 single "Falling", which entered the charts in than 20 countries after going viral in 2019. His debut studio album Nicotine (2020), moderately entered the Billboard 200.

== Career ==
Daniel started his career uploading his music to SoundCloud. His 2017 single "Pretend" eventually took off after being upload by a popular YouTube channel. He later got a call from Internet Money's Taz Taylor and signed a joint record contract with them along Alamo and Interscope in July 2018.

Daniel released the EPs Homesick in 2018 and Restless in 2019. The former featured the single "Falling", coming out in October that year. Despite the release of a Blackbear remix of the track it didn't become popular until 2019, after going viral on video-sharing app TikTok. It became his first charting single on the US Billboard Hot 100, peaking at number 17. The song was featured on Daniel's debut album Nicotine, also preceded by the single "Past Life" which was later re-released featuring vocals of American singer and actress Selena Gomez.

In 2020 he was featured on "Clown" on Blackbear's album Everything Means Nothing, provided vocals for a remix of "Bitter" by Fletcher and Kito and was also featured on Don Diablo and Imanbek's single "Kill Me Better". In 2021 he collaborated with Becky G and Tainy on "F is For Friends" for The SpongeBob Movie: Sponge on the Run soundtrack and appeared on "My Dear Love" by Bebe Rexha featuring Ty Dolla $ign from the former's second album Better Mistakes. He is currently working on his second album called "Sad Now Doesn't Mean Sad Forever". In June 2021 he released "Fingers Crossed" with American singer-songwriter Julia Michaels. It was accompanied by a music video directed by Grant Spanier. He was then seen on a Music Video with a popular DJ and Record Producer Alan Walker on Alan's song 'Extremes' which released on September 30 for Alan's Upcoming studio Album 'WALKERVERSE PT. II'. In 2023, he collaborated with Neoni for their song Bleach.

In a post on X (formerly Twitter) on July 12, 2024, Daniel announced that he had parted ways with his former record label, Alamo Records/RCA.

On October 25, 2024, Daniel released his comeback single, "Tempo", under his new record deal with Fearless Records & TLNTD Records. The record deal was short-lived, as he announced on X (formerly Twitter) on May 2, 2025, that he had got out of the record deal.

== Personal life ==
Daniel lived in Baton Rouge, Louisiana. His family moved to Fort Worth, Texas and later settled down in Houston, Texas where the singer calls home. Daniel admits that music became important to him in his life as a child and started playing drums in second grade. In high school, he began making music in Mixcraft 5 and recording vocals in his bedroom closet with the advice of YouTube tutorials. He decided to pursue music professionally in 2017.

== Musical influences ==
Daniel has been quoted revealing that his earliest influences were rap, rock, house and pop. He has cited Kanye West, Drake and Kid Cudi as influences.

== Discography ==
=== Studio albums ===
List of studio albums with selected chart positions
Title	Details	Peak chart positions	
Title	Details	US	CAN
Nicotine	Released: March 26, 2020; Label: Alamo, Interscope; Format: Digital download, streaming	79	61

=== EPs ===
List of EPs with selected chart positions
Title	Details	Peak chart positions	
Title	Details	US	CAN
Homesick	Released: October 11, 2018; Label: Alamo, Interscope, Internet Money; Format: digital download, streaming	64	37
Restless	Released: March 22, 2019; Label: Alamo, Interscope, Internet Money; Format: digital download, streaming	—	—
That Was Then	Released: November 5, 2021; Label: Alamo, RCA; Format: digital download, streaming	—	—
"—" denotes a recording that did not chart or was not released in that territory.

=== Singles ===
==== As lead artist ====
Title	Year	Peak chart positions										Certifications	Album/EP
Title	Year	US	US R&B/HH	AUS	CAN	FRA	IRE	NLD	NZ	SWI	UK	Certifications	Album/EP
"Youth"	2017	—	—	—	—	—	—	—	—	—	—		Non-album singles
"Pretend"	2017	—	—	—	—	—	—	—	—	—	—		Non-album singles
"With You"	2018	—	—	—	—	—	—	—	—	—	—		Non-album singles
"Mirror"	2018	—	—	—	—	—	—	—	—	—	—		Non-album singles
"Face It"	2018	—	—	—	—	—	—	—	—	—	—		Non-album singles
"Wake Up"	2018	—	—	—	—	—	—	—	—	—	—		Non-album singles
"Drive"	2018	—	—	—	—	—	—	—	—	—	—		Non-album singles
"Falling"	2018	17	11	13	13	21	12	11	17	11	14	RIAA: 4× Platinum; ARIA: 2× Platinum; BPI: Platinum; RMNZ: 3× Platinum; SNEP: Platinum	Homesick and Nicotine
"Trouble"	2019	—	—	—	—	—	—	—	—	—	—		Non-album single
"Paranoid"	2019	—	—	—	—	—	—	—	—	—	—		Restless
"Never"	2019	—	—	—	—	—	—	—	—	—	—		Non-album singles
"Forgot"	2019	—	—	—	—	—	—	—	—	—	—		Non-album singles
"Past Life" (solo or with Selena Gomez)	2020	77	—	—	68	—	89	—	— (Note: "Past Life" did not enter the NZ Top 40 Singles Chart, but peaked at number 5 on the NZ Hot Singles Chart.)	—	—	RIAA: Gold; MC: Platinum; RMNZ: Gold	Nicotine
"Fingers Crossed" (with Julia Michaels)	2021	—	—	—	—	—	—	—	— (Note: "Fingers Crossed" did not enter the NZ Top 40 Singles Chart, but peaked at number 35 on the NZ Hot Singles Chart.)	—	—		That Was Then
"Alone"	2021	—	—	—	—	—	—	—	—	—	—		That Was Then
"Dadada"	2021	—	—	—	—	—	—	—	—	—	—		That Was Then
"Extremes" (with Alan Walker)	2022	—	—	—	—	—	—	—	—	—	—		Walkerverse Pt. I & II
"Karma"	2022	—	—	—	—	—	—	—	—	—	—		Non-album singles
"SYL"	2023	—	—	—	—	—	—	—	—	—	—		Non-album singles
"Exhausted"	2023	—	—	—	—	—	—	—	—	—	—		Non-album singles
"Heartstrings"	2023	—	—	—	—	—	—	—	—	—	—		Non-album singles
"No Love" (with Bonnie X Clyde and Dvbbs)	2023	—	—	—	—	—	—	—	—	—	—		There's No Tomorrow
"Tempo"	2024	—	—	—	—	—	—	—	—	—	—		TBA
"Sweet"	2024	—	—	—	—	—	—	—	—	—	—		TBA
"—" denotes a recording that did not chart or was not released in that territory.

==== As featured artist ====
Single	Year	Album
"Bitter" (Fletcher featuring Trevor Daniel)	2020	The S(ex) Tapes (Fletcher album)
"Kill Me Better" (Don Diablo and Imanbek featuring Trevor Daniel)	2020	Forever
"Malibu Remix" (Sangiovanni featuring Trevor Daniel)	2021	Sangiovanni
"Cold Blood" (Silverstein featuring Trevor Daniel)	2022	Misery Made Me
"Angel" (The Rose featuring Trevor Daniel)	2023	Dual

=== Promotional singles ===
==== As featured artist ====
Title	Year	Album
"I Need Love" (Zara Larsson featuring Trevor Daniel)	2021	Poster Girl (Summer Edition)

=== Guest appearances ===
Title	Year	Other artist(s)	Album
"Clown"	2020	Blackbear	Everything Means Nothing
"F Is for Friends"	2021	Becky G, Tainy	The SpongeBob Movie: Sponge on the Run (Original Motion Picture Soundtrack)
"My Dear Love"	2021	Bebe Rexha, Ty Dolla $ign	Better Mistakes
