= Healing (song) =

2021 single by Fletcher

Single by Fletcher

from the album Girl of My Dreams (Deluxe)
- Released: June 22, 2021
- Genre: Pop
- Length: 3:08
- Label: Capitol
- Songwriter(s): Cari Fletcher; Scott Harris; Gregory Hein
- Producer(s): James Ho

Fletcher singles chronology
"She Said" (2021)	"Healing" (2021)	"Girls Girls Girls" (2021)

Music video
- "Healing" on YouTube

"Healing is a song co-written and performed by American pop singer Fletcher, released on June 22, 2021. Initially issued as a standalone single, the song appeared on the deluxe edition of her debut studio album Girl of My Dreams. The song was produced by frequent collaborator Malay.

== Music video ==
The official music video for "Healing" was directed by Fletcher and Ava Rikki. The video has accumulated 3.9 million views since its release in 2021.

== Chart positions ==
Chart performance for "Healing"
Chart (2021)	Peak position
New Zealand Hot Singles (RMNZ)	32
