= Homesick (EP) =

EP by Trevor Daniel
- Released: October 11, 2018
- Length: 17:01
- Label: Alamo; Interscope; Internet Money
- Producer: Charlie Handsome; KC Supreme; Taz Taylor

Trevor Daniel chronology
Homesick (2018)	Restless (2019)

Singles from Homesick
- 1. "Falling" Released: October 5, 2018

Homesick is the debut EP by American singer Trevor Daniel. It was released on October 11, 2018, by Alamo, Interscope and Internet Money Records.

== Track listing ==
Track listing adapted from the Tidal.

No.	Title	Writer(s)	Producer(s)	Length
1.	"Falling"	Trevor Neill; Ryan Vojtesak; Danny Snodgrass Jr.; Kim Candilora II; Martin Kottmeier; Tristan Norton	Charlie Handsome; KC Supreme; Taz Taylor	2:39
2.	"Mess"	Neill; E-Trou; Taylor; TouchofTrent		2:48
3.	"On My Own"	Neill; Taylor; MjNichols		2:34
4.	"For You"	Neill; JrHitmaker; Jol'z; KC Supreme; Taz Taylor; TouchofTrent		2:43
5.	"Wild"	Neill; KC Supreme; Taz Taylor; Weston Weiss		3:06
6.	"I Don't Know"	Neill; Devin Wright; Edgard Herrera; Taylor; MjNichols		3:11
Total length:				17:01

== Charts ==
=== Weekly charts ===
Chart (2020)	Peak position
Canadian Albums (Billboard)	37
US Billboard 200	64
US Top R&B/Hip-Hop Albums (Billboard)	35

=== Year-end charts ===
Chart (2020)	Position
US Billboard 200	178
US Top R&B/Hip-Hop Albums (Billboard)	82
