= Nicotine (album) =

Studio album by Trevor Daniel
- Released: March 26, 2020
- Recorded: 2018–2020
- Length: 25:56
- Label: Alamo; Interscope
- Producer: Gregory Aldae; Bardo; Based1; Ryan Bevolo; Blake Slatkin; Capi; Dwilly; E Trou; Omer Fedi; Finneas; Charlie Handsome; Jasper Harris; Cole Hutzler; KC Supreme; Angel Lopez; Nick Mira; Pacific; Ragelogic; Relik; Repko; Sean Myer; Sober Rob; Taz Taylor

Trevor Daniel chronology
Restless (2018)	Nicotine (2020)	Sad Now Doesn't Mean Sad Forever (2021)

Singles from Nicotine
- 1. "Falling" Released: October 5, 2018; 2. "Past Life" Released: March 6, 2020

Nicotine is the debut studio album by American singer Trevor Daniel. It was released on March 26, 2020, by Alamo and Interscope Records.

== Track listing ==
Credits adapted from Apple Music and Tidal.

No.	Title	Writer(s)	Producer(s)	Length
1.	"Nicotine"	Omer Fedi; Bardo Novotny; Cole Hutzler; Jose A. Velasquez; Justin de Vries; Kim Candilora II; Nicholas Mira; Stefan Schönewille; Trevor Neill; William Repko IV	Bardo; Mira; Fedi; KC Supreme; Repko; Pacific; Angel Lopez; Cole Hutzler; Trevor Daniel	2:46
2.	"Lovesick"	Fedi; Alex Dowbnia; Novotny; Blake Slatkin; Cole Hutzler; Mira; Candilora II; Rober Connelly; Neill; Repko IV	Sober Rob; Repko; Ragelogic; Fedi; Mira; KC Supreme; Hutzler; Slatkin; Bardo; Daniel	2:55
3.	"Anymore"	Novotny; Hutzler; Hagan Lange; Candilora II; Fedi; Ryan Bevolo; Neill; Repko IV	Ryan Bevolo; Repko; Fedi; KC Supreme; Hagan; Hutzler; Bardo; Daniel	2:11
4.	"Things We Do for Love"	Gregory Hein; Kevin Carbo; Neill	Capi; Gregory Aldae; Daniel	2:33
5.	"All of That"	Jasper Lee Harris; David Wilson; Elias Latrau; A. Velasquez; Candilora II; Fedi; Neill; Repko IV	KC Supreme; Dwilly; Repko; E Trou; Lopez; Harris; Daniel	2:02
6.	"OMG"	Novotny; Hutzler; Latrou; Candilora II; Fedi; Neill; Repko IV	Hutzler; Fedi; Bardo; KC Supreme; Repko; E Trou; Daniel	2:26
7.	"Disaster"	David Lataille Jr.; Fedi; Neill	Relik; Fedi; Daniel	2:46
8.	"911"	Ben Sturdivant; A. Velasquez; Fedi; Neill	Based1; Fedi; Lopez; Daniel	2:33
9.	"Past Life"	Neill; Finneas O'Connell; Sean Myer; Caroline Pennell; Mick Coogan; Jay Stolar	Finneas; Myer	3:01
10.	"Falling"	Neill; Tristan Norton; Martin Kottmeier; Danny Snodgrass, Jr.; Ryan Vojtesak	KC Supreme; Taz Taylor; Charlie Handsome	2:39
Total length:				25:52

== Charts ==
Chart performance for Nicotine
Chart (2020)	Peak position
Canadian Albums (Billboard)	61
Estonian Albums (Eesti Tipp-40)	15
Lithuanian Albums (AGATA)	17
US Billboard 200	79

== Certifications ==
Certifications for Nicotine
Region	Certification	Certified units/sales
New Zealand (RMNZ)	Gold	7,500^{‡}
^{‡} Sales+streaming figures based on certification alone.
