= Would You Still Love Me If You Really Knew Me? =

2025 studio album by Fletcher

Studio album by Fletcher
- Released: July 18, 2025
- Recorded: 2024–2025
- Length: 39:51
- Label: Capitol
- Producer: Fletcher; Jennifer Decilveo; Malay

Fletcher chronology
In Search of the Antidote (2024)	Would You Still Love Me If You Really Knew Me? (2025)	Would I Still Love Me If I Really Knew Me? (Live from California) (2025)

Singles from Would You Still Love Me If You Really Knew Me?
- 1. "Boy" Released: June 5, 2025; 2. "Hi, Everyone Leave Please" Released: July 18, 2025

Would You Still Love Me If You Really Knew Me? is the third studio album by American singer-songwriter Fletcher. It was released on July 18, 2025, through Capitol Records. The album was co-produced with Jennifer Decilveo and supported by two singles, "Boy" and "Hi, Everyone Leave Please". Written during late 2024 and early 2025, it reflects her personal growth and shifting perspectives following her previous album, In Search of the Antidote (2024).

Thematically, Would You Still Love Me If You Really Knew Me? explores themes of self-acceptance, identity, and emotional renewal. It combines acoustic and pop elements which emphasizes raw lyricism and stripped-back production. Critics noted its emotional depth and reflective tone, viewing it as a continuation of Fletcher's exploration of authenticity and queer identity. Would You Still Love Me If You Really Knew Me? reached number 29 on the Belgian Albums Chart and number 34 on the German Albums Chart.

== Background ==
Ahead of the album's release, Fletcher described Would You Still Love Me If You Really Knew Me? as deeply personal, calling it "my heart split open on record" in a hand-written letter shared with fans. She noted that the album was born from questioning whether she would still be loved if she revealed her present self, framing it as both an expression of vulnerability and liberation. Much of her earlier work had centered on sapphic narratives; with the release of "Boy", she introduced a different perspective by addressing a relationship with a man. Fletcher explained that, with this project, she aimed to create an expression of vulnerability and emotionality. She further stated that her past performances often revolved around creating what she described as an "epic experience" for her audience.

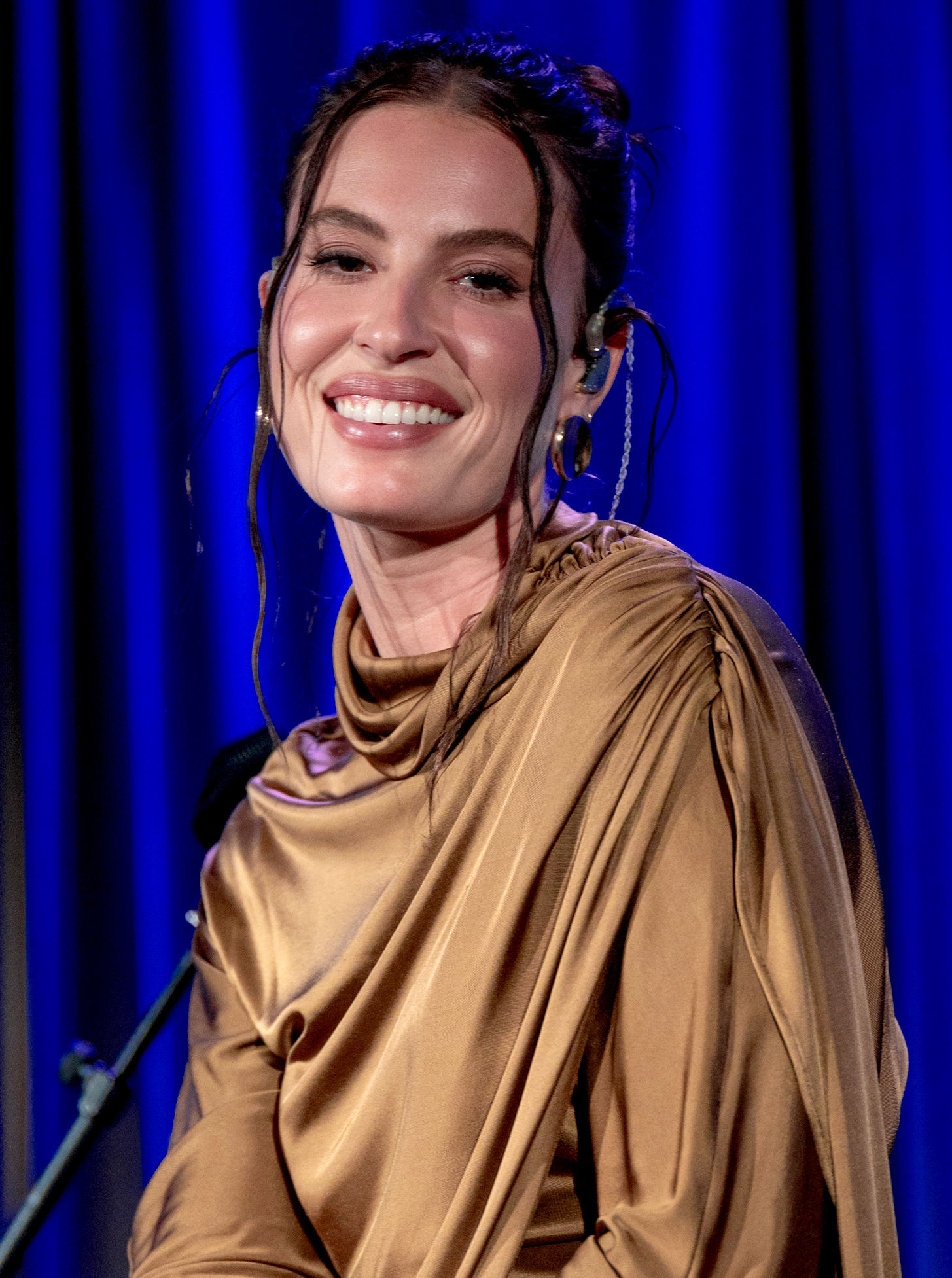
Fletcher in late 2024, a time she described as emotionally intense while beginning work on the album.

In another interview, Fletcher said that Would You Still Love Me If You Really Knew Me? felt like her most unguarded work to date. Released only a year after her second studio album In Search of the Antidote (2024), the album came together quickly—a pace she said mirrored the urgency she felt while writing it. She recalled: "Last year was one of the hardest years of my life", describing the record as "confessing everything that had been alive in my heart". She also admitted feeling "nervous, excited, scared, [and] relieved" as release day approached. In Rolling Stone, Fletcher explained that a "flood of emotions"—which shaped the album—emerged in late 2024 and early 2025, in the period following her recent tour. Regarding the inspiration behind "Boy", she did not provide specifics about her current relationship status. But she noted that she is in a positive place personally, adding that she had recently begun experiencing love again and feeling a deeper emotional connection.

== Composition ==
"Would You Still Love Me?"
In "Would You Still Love Me?", Fletcher concludes with a spoken-word segment, asking "tough questions" to both herself and her fans.

According to Elle, Would You Still Love Me If You Really Knew Me? consists of twelve introspective tracks that reveal a more unguarded side of Fletcher. She described its period as "a continuation" of her artistry — an emotional deepening and expansion rather than a departure from her previous work. A closing track, "Would You Still Love Me?", incorporates spoken word elements and poses questions to herself and her listeners. In an interview with Rolling Stone, Fletcher explained that "Boy" reflects a new chapter in her queer journey after unexpectedly falling in love with a man. She emphasized that she remains "so proud to be queer" and that the album is "not about a guy"; but rather about self-discovery and acceptance. She also described "Hi, Everyone Leave Please" as expressing her desire for freedom and as addressing her experiences in the music industry, including competition, shifting expectations, and burnout.

== Promotion ==
In the lead-up to the album's announcement, Fletcher cleared her Instagram page and began posting new teasers, including Pride Month greetings and the hand-written letter about the record. On June 5, 2025, she released the album's lead single "Boy", and simultaneously announced the album. It was her first studio album release since In Search of the Antidote, marking the beginning of a new phase in her career. "Hi, Everyone Leave Please" was released as the album's second single on July 18, accompanied by a video directed by a duo Birthplace, consisting of Pfion Vince and Madison Phipps.

== Critical reception ==
Professional ratings
Review scores
Source	Rating
Clash	7/10
Dork	4/5
Stereoboard	3/5 stars

Kaitlin Willoughby of Clash noted that Would You Still Love Me If You Really Knew Me? is built around a "dreamy, acoustic pop" tracks, which "pensively ruminate on identity, embracing change and practising self-love". Dork's Felicity Newton described the album as a candid and introspective record, highlighting its focus on self-discovery and the challenges of balancing personal authenticity with the expectations of others. Writing for Stereoboard, Issy Herring observed that it features a more stripped-back production compared to Fletcher's previous synth-pop work, emphasizing her experiences in the music industry and marking a shift in her music and lyrics. Melodic Magazine author Reagan Denning noted that while listeners first encountered Fletcher's alter ego, Cari, on her previous project Girl of My Dreams through tracks like "For Cari" and "I Think I'm Growing", the new album "brings her true self to the forefront, allowing Cari to take center stage".

Elle stated that while her earlier work has frequently drawn from autobiographical experiences, Would You Still Love Me If You Really Knew Me? carries a "different kind of rawness". Billboard described the album as "deeply introspective [and] often discomforting", concluding that she spills out all her "intrusive" thoughts in front of her listeners through Would You Still Love Me, and spends her time waiting for their opinions.

== Track listing ==
All songs were written and produced by Fletcher and Jennifer Decilveo, except where noted.

Standard edition
No.	Title	Writer(s)	Producer(s)	Length
1.	"Party"	Fletcher; Jennifer Decilveo; Shane McAnally		3:34
2.	"Hi, Everyone Leave Please"			2:56
3.	"Don't Tempt Me..."			3:56
4.	"The Arsonist"	Fletcher; Decilveo; McAnally		3:28
5.	"Boy"	Decilveo; McAnally; Fletcher		3:22
6.	"Chaos"	Fletcher; Decilveo; Caitlyn Smith		3:42
7.	"Distance"	Fletcher; Decilveo; Malay; Ilsey	Fletcher; Decilveo; Malay	3:23
8.	"Good Girl / Gone Girl"	Fletcher; Decilveo; Ilya; Aldae		3:20
9.	"All of the Women"			3:54
10.	"Congratulations!"			3:10
11.	"Would You Still Love Me?"			5:06
Total length:				39:51

Bonus track on physical editions
No.	Title	Length
12.	"Hail Mary"	3:24
Total length:		42:55

Extended version
No.	Title	Length
13.	"Until Next Time (Outro)"

=== Notes ===
- "Distance" is stylized as "D i s t a n c e".

== Personnel ==
Credits were adapted from Tidal and AllMusic.

- Fletcher – vocals, songwriting, production
- Jennifer Decilveo – programming, synthesizer, engineering (all tracks); piano (tracks 1–5, 7–11) drums (1, 3, 4, 7–10), organ (1), drum programming (2, 5)
- Nick "Squids" Squillante – vocal production, engineering
- Sylvia MacCalla – vocal production
- Sean Cook – engineering
- Rob Kinelski – mixing
- Eli Heisler – additional mixing
- Dale Becker – mastering
- Adam Burt – mastering assistance
- Nate Mingo – mastering assistance
- Katie Harvey – mastering assistance
- David Levita – guitar (1–10), bass (1, 6)
- Sam KS – drums (1–5, 7–10)
- Patrick Kelly – bass (2–5, 7–10)
- Tess Bjiere – art direction, creative direction
- Carissa Gallo – photography

== Charts ==
Weekly chart performance
Chart (2025)	Peak position
Belgian Albums (Ultratop Flanders)	29
Belgian Albums (Ultratop Wallonia)	113
German Albums (Offizielle Top 100)	34
Dutch Albums (Album Top 100)	78
Scottish Albums (OCC)	22
Spanish Albums (PROMUSICAE)	46
UK Albums Sales (OCC)	33
UK Download Albums (OCC)	87
UK Physical Albums (OCC)	29
UK Vinyl Albums (OCC)	31

== Live EP ==
Would I Still Love Me If I Really Knew Me? (Live from California)

EP / live album by Fletcher
- Released: September 26, 2025
- Length: 17:28
- Label: Capitol
- Producer: Fletcher; Jennifer Decilveo

Fletcher chronology
Would You Still Love Me If You Really Knew Me? (2025)	Would I Still Love Me If I Really Knew Me? (Live from California) (2025)

Fletcher released a live EP on September 28, 2025, titled Would I Still Love Me If I Really Knew Me? (Live from California), featuring tracks from Would You Still Love Me If You Really Knew Me?. The live EP features five overall tracks, with Jennifer Decilveo on piano and Shane McAnally on guitar. According to Sam Taylor of Dork, Carissa Gallo-directed visual snippet features Fletcher performing all tracks "against the backdrop of the Californian mountains".

=== Track listing ===
All tracks were written and produced by Fletcher and Jennifer Decilveo, except where noted.

Would I Still Love Me If I Really Knew Me? (Live from California) track listing
No.	Title	Writer(s)	Length
1.	"Would You Still Love Me?" (Live from California)		3:09
2.	"Chaos" (Live from California)	Fletcher; Jennifer Decilveo; Caitlyn Smith	3:58
3.	"Good Girl / Gone Girl" (Live from California)	Fletcher; Decilveo; Ilya; Aldae	3:45
4.	"Boy" (Live from California)	Fletcher; Decilveo; Shane McAnally	3:49
5.	"Congratulations!" (Live from California)		2:46
Total length:			17:38
