= If I Hated You =

2020 single by Fletcher

Single by Fletcher

from the EP The S(ex) Tapes
- Released: August 12, 2020
- Genre: Pop
- Length: 3:34
- Label: Capitol
- Songwriters: Cari Fletcher; James Ho; Maureen McDonald
- Producer: James Ho

Fletcher singles chronology
"Bitter" (2020)	"If I Hated You" (2020)	"Feel" (2020)

Music video
- "If I Hated You" on YouTube

"If I Hated You" is a song co-written and performed by American pop singer Fletcher; issued as the second single from her third extended play The S(ex) Tapes. The song was produced by Malay, who also served as co-writer.

== Music video ==
The official music video for "If I Hated You" was directed by Shannon Beveridge (Fletcher's ex-girlfriend). Fletcher and Beveridge filmed the music video while quarantining together during the COVID-19 pandemic. In an interview with the magazine Clash, Fletcher said, " {the music video for} 'If I Hated You' is filmed with six different security cameras in a room showing you what missing someone and thinking about them drunk at night feels like."

== Chart positions ==
Chart (2020)	Peak position
NZ Hot 40 Singles	30
