= Sting (Fletcher song) =

2022 single by Fletcher

Single by Fletcher

from the album Girl of My Dreams
- Released: September 2, 2022
- Length: 3:07
- Label: Capitol
- Songwriter(s): Cari Fletcher; Ali Payami; Jennifer Decilveo; Wens
- Producer(s): Ali Payami; Jennifer Decilveo; Malay

Fletcher singles chronology
"Becky's So Hot" (2022)	"Sting" (2022)	"Better Version" (2022)

Music video
- "Sting" on YouTube

"Sting" is a song by American pop singer Fletcher, released on September 2, 2022. It is the opening track and eighth track on the deluxe edition from her debut studio album Girl of My Dreams and was issued as the album's third single. An official lyric video for the song was released on September 1, 2022; one day before the single's official release.

== Background ==
Following the drama-filled buzz of her breakout single "Becky's So Hot", Fletcher continued to explore the emotional aftermath of a high-profile breakup. As part of the lead-up to her debut studio album Girl of My Dreams, she released "Sting" as a reflection of unresolved pain. The track centers on the lingering hurt of heartbreak, with Fletcher posing introspective questions about what it will take for her to finally move on.

== Composition ==
"Sting" builds on the sonic motifs Fletcher has explored throughout her career, combining emotive production with confessional lyricism. The track features a steady beat and melancholic tone that underscore her vulnerability. Lyrically, the song introduces a sense of emotional clarity as Fletcher embraces the complexity of pain, singing, "Maybe I like the way it sting".

== Critical reception ==
Pitchfork highlighted the song's energetic rhythm, calling it the strongest track on the album, but critiqued its emotional delivery. The review argued that Fletcher's intensity occasionally tips into melodrama and that the song's imagery, while evocative, lacks depth—citing a crumpled Taylor Swift shirt as one of the few concrete details.

== Chart performance ==
"Sting" chart performance
Chart (2022)	Peak position
NZ Hot 40 Singles	21
