= Bitter (Fletcher song) =

2020 single by Fletcher

Single by Fletcher featuring Kito or Trevor Daniel

from the EP The S(ex) Tapes
- Released: May 13, 2020
- Genre: Pop
- Length: 3:15
- Label: Capitol
- Songwriter(s): Cari Fletcher; Maaike Lebbing; Mary Weitz
- Producer(s): Maaike Lebbing

Fletcher singles chronology
"Forever" (2020)	"Bitter" (2020)	"If I Hated You" (2020)

Kito singles chronology
"Alone with You" (2020)	"Bitter" (2020)	"Follow" (2020)

Trevor Daniel singles chronology
"Past Life" (2020)	"Bitter" (2020)	"Kill Me Better" (2020)

Music videos
- "Bitter" (featuring Kito) on YouTube
- "Bitter" (featuring Trevor Daniel) on YouTube

"Bitter" is a song co-written and performed by American pop singer Fletcher; issued as the lead single from her third extended play The S(ex) Tapes. Two versions of the song were released: one version featuring producer Kito; and another version featuring American singer Trevor Daniel. Kito produced both versions of the song but she is not credited as a featured artist on the latter version.

"Bitter" was certified platinum by the Recording Industry Association of America on August 8, 2025.

== Music videos ==
An official music video was commissioned for each version of "Bitter". The music video for the version of the song featuring Kito was directed by Shannon Beveridge (Fletcher's ex-girlfriend). The music video for the version of the song featuring Trevor Daniel was directed by Brooke James.

== Certifications ==
Certifications and sales for "Bitter"
Region	Certification	Certified units/sales
Brazil (Pro-Música Brasil)	Gold	20,000^{‡}
Canada (Music Canada)	Gold	40,000^{‡}
United Kingdom (BPI)	Silver	200,000^{‡}
United States (RIAA)	Platinum	1,000,000^{‡}
^{‡} Sales+streaming figures based on certification alone.
