= Invisible (Zara Larsson song) =

Single by Zara Larsson

from the album Klaus: Original Motion Picture Soundtrack
- Released: 8 November 2019
- Genre: Pop; Ballad
- Length: 2:53
- Label: TEN; Epic; London 15
- Songwriters: Zara Larsson; Justin Tranter; Alfonso González Aguilar; Caroline Pennell; Jussi Karvinen
- Producer: Jussifer

Zara Larsson singles chronology
"All the Time" (2019)	"Invisible" (2019)	"Like It Is" (2020)

Music video
- "Invisible" on YouTube

"Invisible" is a song by Swedish singer Zara Larsson for the soundtrack to the 2019 Netflix original animated film Klaus. It was written by Larsson, Justin Tranter, Alfonso González Aguilar, Caroline Pennell and Jussi Karvinen, the latter was the one who produced it. The single was released on November 8, 2019, and the official music video was released on November 15 of the same year.

== Composition ==
"Invisible" is a pop ballad written by Larsson and Justin Tranter, who were assisted by Jussifer y Caroline Pennell. Zara described the song as "beautiful" and her "message of kindness speaks perfectly to the message of Klaus. I think it can inspire all of us to be a little compassionate to one another".

Tranter says "that director Sergio Pablos told them the theme of Klaus, and showed them parts of the storyboard. After this, Tranter began writing lyrics with a focus on that theme. Pablos wanted the song to have traditional Scandinavian influences, so Tranter worked with a Scandinavian producer to achieve the desired sound".

== Live performances ==
Larsson performed the song live for the first time on The Ellen DeGeneres Show on 3 December 2019.

== Awards and nominations ==
Year	Organization	Award	Result	Ref.
2019	Goya Awards	Best Original Song	Nominated	
2019	Hollywood Music in Media Awards	Best Original Song in an Animated Film	Nominated	

== Charts ==
=== Weekly charts ===
Chart (2019)	Peak position
Sweden (Sverigetopplistan)	44

== Release history ==
Region	Date	Format	Version	Label	Ref.
Various	8 November 2019	Digital download	Original	TEN; Epic	
