= Girls Girls Girls (Fletcher song) =

2021 single by Fletcher

Single by Fletcher
- Released: October 8, 2021
- Genre: Pop
- Length: 2:41
- Label: Capitol
- Songwriters: Cathy Dennis; Cari Fletcher; Lukasz Gottwald; Jonas W. Karlsson; Maaike Lebbing; Madison Love; Max Martin; Katy Perry; Mary Weitz
- Producer: Maaike Lebbing

Fletcher singles chronology
| "Healing" (2021) | "Girls Girls Girls" (2021) | "Cherry" (2021) |

Music video
- "Girls Girls Girls" on YouTube

"Girls Girls Girls" is a song co-written and performed by American pop singer Fletcher; issued as a standalone single on October 8, 2021. The song contains an interpolation of "I Kissed a Girl" as performed by Katy Perry.

== Music video ==
The official music video for "Girls Girls Girls" was directed by Kristen Jan Wong.

== Chart positions ==
| Chart (2021) | Peak position |
|---|---|
| NZ Hot 40 Singles | 32 |
