= Zolita =

American singer-songwriter (born 1994)

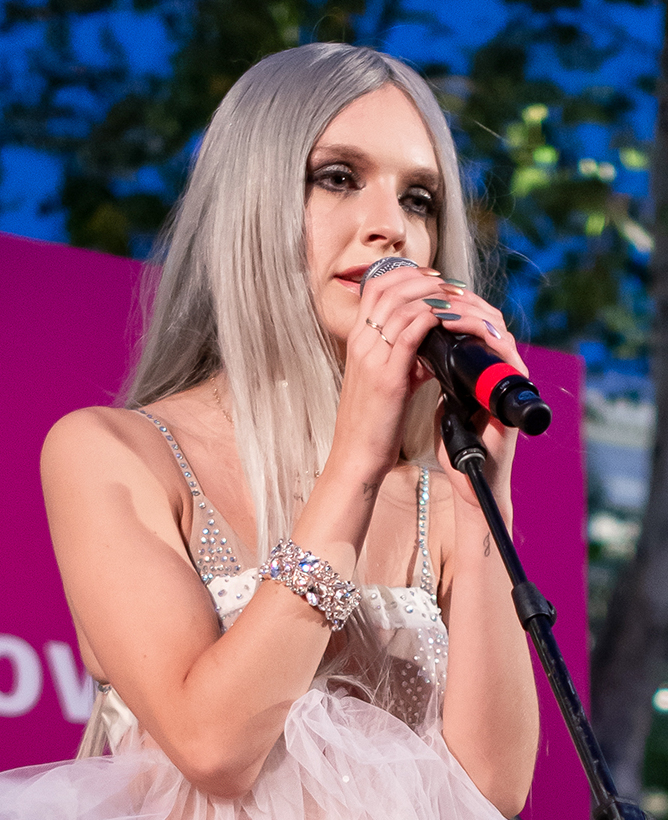
- Zolita performing at The Grove in Los Angeles, California in June 2018

Background information
- Born: Zoë Montana Hoetzel; September 23, 1994 (age 32)
- Genres: Alternative pop; electropop
- Occupations: Singer; songwriter; director; photographer
- Instruments: Vocals; guitar; piano
- Years active: 2015–present
- Labels: Tuxedo Media Group LLC; AWAL
- Website: zolitamusic.com

Zoë Montana Hoetzel (born September 23, 1994), known professionally as Zolita, is an American singer-songwriter. In 2015, she gained recognition when the music video for her song, "Explosion" became a viral video. Following its success, she released the music videos for the singles "Holy" (2016) and "Fight Like a Girl" (2017) directed by herself. She has released three extended plays: Immaculate Conception (2015), Sappho (2018), and Falling Out / Falling In (2023) as well as two studio albums: Evil Angel (2020) and Queen of Hearts (2024).

== Early life ==
Zolita was born on September 23, 1994, in New York to Heidi Schwarck and Holger Hoetzel, and was raised in Calabasas, California. Her father is of German descent, and her mother is of Danish descent. Her father inspired her to start making music and she grew up playing bluegrass and flat pick guitar. She has a brother, Max Montana, a basketball player; and a sister, Luna, a YouTuber and ballerina. She and her siblings all share the middle name Montana.

== Career ==
In 2015, Zolita gained recognition when the music video for her song, "Explosion" became a viral video. On October 13, 2015, she released her debut extended play Immaculate Conception. In June 2016, she released a video for the single "Holy", containing themes of female sexuality, spirituality, and feminism.

In 2017, Zolita released the first single from her second extended play Sappho titled "Fight Like a Girl", a protest song with feminist themes inspired by the Donald Trump 2016 presidential campaign. On October 26, 2017, she released "Come Home with Me" as the second single, and on May 4, 2018, she released "New You" as the third single from her second extended play Sappho which was released on May 18 of that year. Also in May 2018, she released "Like Heaven", which was listed on the list of "30 Lesbian Love Songs" by Billboard. On December 5, 2018, she released "Truth Tea" along with a music video as the lead single from her debut album, Evil Angel. On March 8, 2019, she released "Black Magic" along with a visual video, however, the song wasn't included on the final tracklist of her debut album. On June 28, 2019, she released "Shut Up and Cry" along with a lyric video as the second single from Evil Angel. On February 14, 2020, she released a cover of Usher's song "U Remind Me" with a music video. On August 7, 2020, she released "Oblivion" along with a music video as the third single from Evil Angel. On September 25 of the same year she released "Bedspell" as the fourth single from the album, and on November 20 she premiered the music video on the online magazine's website Them. The promotional single, "Loveline" was released a week before the album's release, and on December 4, 2020, her debut studio album, Evil Angel, was released.

Zolita released music videos for "Somebody I Fucked Once," "Single In September," and "I Fucking Love You" as a trilogy. Within the first week of release, the music video for "Somebody I Fucked Once" had 5 million views on YouTube. Her love interest is played by Tatchi Rigsby. Zolita's close friend Shannon Beveridge was the creative director for the latter two videos. She released the EP Falling Out / Falling In via AWAL in February 2023.

In 2024, Zolita released multiple singles, including "Small Town Scandal", all of which were part of the album Queen of Hearts, released later that year.

== Artistry ==
Zolita's music has been described as "a blend of dark-pop and R&B". Her musical style incorporates witchcraft and religion. She says that religious and witchcraft magic aesthetics are a huge part of her life saying "I feel like queer people are so drawn to Wicca and witchcraft because it's always been the alternative religion, it puts the power in yourself, and it's not historically been a religion that doesn't like queer people." She also cites Lady Gaga as her biggest influence.

== Personal life ==
Zolita is a lesbian. In a 2017 interview, she stated that she was afraid to come out to her female friends, saying "I was also worried that my female friends would no longer want to have girls' nights or sleepovers for fear that I might be attracted to them. So, I decided to keep my newfound queerness a secret." She also identifies herself as a witch; she explains this in videos on her YouTube channel, but also in her music videos where witchcraft is incorporated.

== Discography ==
=== Studio albums ===
Title	Details
Evil Angel	Released: December 4, 2020; Format: CD, LP, digital download; Label: Self-released
Queen of Hearts	Released: May 31, 2024; Format: digital download; Label: AWAL
Hell's Belles	Released: August 28, 2026; Format: TBA; Label: AWAL

=== Extended plays ===
Title	Details
Immaculate Conception	Released: October 13, 2015; Format: Digital download; Label: Self-released
Sappho	Released: May 18, 2018; Format: CD, digital download; Label: Tuxedo Media Group LLC
Falling Out / Falling In	Released: February 10, 2023; Format: CD, digital download; Label: AWAL

=== Singles ===
Title	Year	Album
"Explosion"	2015	Immaculate Conception
"Holy"	2016	Immaculate Conception
"Fight Like a Girl"	2017	Sappho
"Come Home with Me"	2017	Sappho
"New You"	2018	Sappho
"Truth Tea"	2018	Evil Angel
"Black Magic"	2019	Evil Angel
"Shut Up and Cry"	2019	Evil Angel
"U Remind Me"	2020	Non-album single
"Oblivion"	2020	Evil Angel
"Bedspell"	2020	Evil Angel
"Somebody I Fucked Once"	2021	Evil Angel
"Single in September"	2022	Non-album singles
"I Fucking Love You”	2022	Non-album singles
"20 Questions"	2022	Falling Out / Falling In
"Ruin My Life”	2022	Falling Out / Falling In
"Ashley”	2023	Falling Out / Falling In
"All Girls Go to Heaven"	2024	Queen of Hearts
"Small Town Scandal"	2024	Queen of Hearts
"Bloodstream"	2024	Queen of Hearts
"Bye Bye Baby"	2024	Queen of Hearts
"Hell's Belles"	2026	Hell's Belles
"Hardcore"	2026	Hell's Belles

=== Promotional singles ===
Title	Year	Album
"Like Heaven"	2018	Sappho
"Loveline"	2020	Evil Angel
