= In Search of the Antidote =

Studio album by Fletcher
- Released: March 22, 2024
- Recorded: Lakehouse (Asbury Park); M&S (Sherman Oaks); Beach Tree (Los Angeles); The Element Lab (Los Angeles); Kinetics & One Love (Los Angeles); Opus (Long Island)
- Length: 31:20
- Label: Capitol
- Producer: Jon Bellion; Jennifer Decilveo; German; The Monsters & Strangerz; Pete Nappi; One Love

Fletcher chronology
| Girl of My Dreams (2022) | In Search of the Antidote (2024) | Would You Still Love Me If You Really Knew Me? (2025) |

Singles from In Search of the Antidote
- 1. "Eras of Us" Released: December 8, 2023; 2. "Lead Me On" Released: January 25, 2024; 3. "Doing Better" Released: March 1, 2024

In Search of the Antidote is the second studio album by American singer-songwriter Fletcher. It was released on March 22, 2024, through Capitol Records. It explores themes of identity, ego, insecurity, and self-fulfillment, inspired by the artist's search for healing and meaning through love. Fletcher described the project as deeply personal, shaped by unfiltered introspection and her experiences with self-reflection and connection. In Search of the Antidote was preceded by several singles, including "Eras of Us", "Lead Me On", and "Doing Better". It debuted at number three on the Billboard Top Album Sales chart.

In Search of the Antidote received generally favorable reviews from critics, earning a Metacritic score of 72. While some praised its production quality, emotional depth, and vocal performance, others felt the album's impact was inconsistent, though they acknowledged standout moments throughout.

== Background ==
In Search of the Antidote explores themes of "identity, insecurity, ego, and self-fulfillment", containing "distinct production" as well as "powerful vocal delivery". A "personal" record, Fletcher acts as the "creative pivot" and examines the singer's "ultra-vivid storytelling and unfiltered introspection". Talking about the topic, Fletcher revealed that she had been looking for "the antidote in so many things" over the years, such as "women, the road, the stage, fans, spirituality and self-reflection". Making of the album begged the question of "what would truly heal" her, ultimately realizing that "love is the antidote". However, it was not until this record that she would see love "through all the different lenses and angles" and discover its "infinite manifestations", which would turn out to be her meaning of In Search of the Antidote.

== Marketing and commercial performance ==
Fletcher released the song "Eras of Us" on December 8, 2023. The song was released as a digital single with an accompanying music video, and she later revealed she was inspired to make the song after attending American singer Taylor Swift's concert tour, the Eras Tour. On January 24, 2024, Fletcher announced the title of the album, and it was revealed that "Eras of Us" would be included on the album.

In the album announcement, Fletcher also shared the song "Lead Me On" would be the next pre-release single. Its music video was unveiled on January 25. "Doing Better", the album's third pre-release single, was released on March 1. In June 2024, the song was included in Rolling Stone's the Best Songs of 2024 So Far. In the weeks leading up to the release of In Search of the Antidote, Fletcher took part in interviews on the Zach Sang Show and with Zane Lowe for Apple Music. She also made a television appearance performing "Pretending" on The Kelly Clarkson Show.

In Search of the Antidote debuted at number three in the US Billboard Top Album Sales charts.

== Critical reception ==
Professional ratings
Aggregate scores
| Source | Rating |
|---|---|
| Metacritic | 72/100 |
Review scores
| Source | Rating |
| AllMusic | 7/10 |
| Clash | 8/10 |
| Dork | 5/5 stars |
| The Line of Best Fit | 8/10 |
| Riff Magazine | 6/10 |

At Metacritic, which assigns a normalized rating out of 100 to reviews from professional publications, In Search of the Antidote received a weighted average score of 72, indicating "generally favorable reviews".

In a review for AllMusic, Marcy Donelson wrote that while her lyrics would be heard sometimes "cringy" and "bratty", the album's "raw vulnerability" is crucial. In concluding her review, the author stated: "In Search of the Antidote followed Girl of My Dreams into the Top 40". Narzra Ahmed of Clash described the album as "heavily produced, but in the best possible way" and complimented the album's "indie feel". Dork's Neive McCarthy wrote that "Fletcher delivers her truths and lessons with some of her most electric tracks yet" on the record. Conversely, Riff Magazine author Ben Siegel believed that the album's production only "occasionally succeeds" while praising Fletcher's vocals and lyrics, concluding the album contains "some fantastic moments".

== Track listing ==
In Search of the Antidote track listing
| No. | Title | Writer(s) | Producer(s) | Length |
|---|---|---|---|---|
| 1. | "Maybe I Am" | Cari Fletcher; Jordan K. Johnson; Stefan Johnson; Michael Pollack; Gregory Aldae Hein; Oliver Peterhof | The Monsters & Strangerz; German; S. Johnson^{[v]} | 2:44 |
| 2. | "Doing Better" | Fletcher; Jennifer Decilveo; Timothy Sommers; Jeremy Dussolliet; Mary Weitz | Decilveo^{[p]}; One Love^{[p]} | 2:33 |
| 3. | "Ego Talking" | Fletcher; Decilveo; Pete Nappi; Madison Love; Julia Michaels | Decilveo^{[p]}; Nappi^{[p]}; Colin Brittain^{[a]} | 2:23 |
| 4. | "Lead Me On" | Fletcher; J. Johnson; S. Johnson; Jon Bellion; Nappi; Pollack; Hein; Jason Cornet | The Monsters & Strangerz; Bellion; Nappi^{[p]} | 2:53 |
| 5. | "Two Things Can Be True" | Fletcher; Decilveo; Michaels | Decilveo^{[p]} | 2:45 |
| 6. | "Eras of Us" | Fletcher; Decilveo; Sommers; Dussolliet | Decilveo^{[p]}; One Love^{[p]} | 2:48 |
| 7. | "Attached to You" | Fletcher; Decilveo; Michaels | Decilveo^{[p]} | 2:36 |
| 8. | "Crush" | Fletcher; Decilveo; Sommers; Weitz | Decilveo^{[p]}; One Love^{[p]} | 2:24 |
| 9. | "Pretending" | Fletcher; Bellion; Nappi; Hein | Bellion; Nappi^{[p]} | 3:02 |
| 10. | "Joyride" | Fletcher; Decilveo; Sommers; Dussolliet | Decilveo^{[p]}; One Love^{[p]} | 3:04 |
| 11. | "Antidote" | Fletcher; Bellion; Nappi; Hein; Cornet | Bellion; Nappi^{[p]} | 4:08 |
| Total length: | | | | 31:20 |

=== Notes ===
- ^{^[p]} signifies a primary and vocal producer.
- ^{^[a]} signifies an additional producer.
- ^{^[v]} signifies a vocal producer.

== Personnel ==
Credits were adapted from the album's liner notes.

=== Musicians ===
- Fletcher – vocals
- Jordan K. Johnson – drums, keyboards, programming, instruments (tracks 1, 4)
- Stefan Johnson – drums, keyboards, programming, instruments (1, 4)
- Oliver Peterhof – drums, keyboards, programming, instruments (1)
- Pierre Lux-Rioux – guitars (1)
- Jennifer Decilveo – programming, instruments, synthesizer, bass, keyboards (2, 3, 5–8, 10); piano (5, 7)
- Mike Squillante – guitars, bass, drums (2, 3, 6, 10)
- One Love – programming, instruments (2, 6, 8, 10)
- Pete Nappi – programming, instruments (3, 9, 11); guitars (4, 9, 11), drums (9, 11)
- Jon Bellion – background vocals, drums, programming, instruments (4, 9, 11)
- David Levita – guitars (5, 7)

=== Technical ===
- Rob Kinelski – mixing
- Eli Heisler – mixing assistance
- Dale Becker – mastering
- Nick "Squids" Squillante – recording
- Stefan Johnson – recording (1)
- Jennifer Decilveo – recording (2, 3, 5–8, 10)
- One Love – recording (2, 6, 8, 10)
- Pete Nappi – recording (3, 4, 9, 11)
- Katie Harvey – mastering assistance
- Nate Mingo – mastering assistance
- Brady Wortzel – recording assistance (1)
- David "Dsilb" Silberstein – production coordination (1, 4)
- Jeremy "Jboogs" Levin – production coordination (1, 4)
- Christian "C" Johnson – production coordination (1, 4)

=== Visuals ===
- Tess Bjiero – creative direction, design
- Sebastián Faena – photography
- Ras Bartram – styling
- Allie Smith – make-up
- Edward Lampley – hair
- Lizzy Oppenheimer – creative production
- Dario Castillo – behind-the-scenes photography
- Nick Steinhardt – art direction, type design
- Patricia Gárate – creative lead

== Charts ==
Chart performance for In Search of the Antidote
| Chart (2024) | Peak position |
|---|---|
| Australian Albums (ARIA) | 66 |
| Austrian Albums (Ö3 Austria) | 74 |
| Belgian Albums (Ultratop Flanders) | 14 |
| Belgian Albums (Ultratop Wallonia) | 55 |
| Dutch Albums (Album Top 100) | 34 |
| German Albums (Offizielle Top 100) | 28 |
| New Zealand Albums (RMNZ) | 23 |
| Scottish Albums (OCC) | 5 |
| Swiss Albums (Schweizer Hitparade) | 85 |
| UK Albums (OCC) | 26 |
| US Billboard 200 | 36 |
