= Cazzette =

Swedish electronic dance music duo

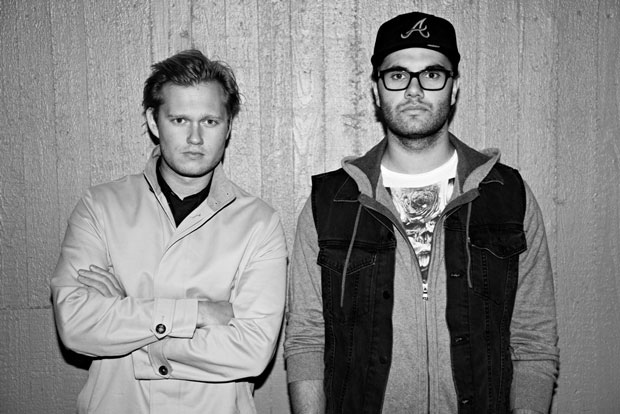
- Cazzette in 2013: Alexander Björklund (left); Sebastian Furrer (right)

Background information
- Origin: Sweden
- Genres: EDM, future house
- Years active: 2011–2018
- Labels: 4th & B'way, PRMD, STMPD
- Members: Alexander Björklund
- Past members: Sebastian Furrer
- Website: https://cazzette.com/ (Archived August 18, 2022)

Cazzette was a Swedish electronic dance music duo, founded in 2011 by musicians Alexander Björklund and Sebastian Furrer.

== Biography ==
The duo is best known for the songs "Beam Me Up", from their debut album Eject (2014), and "Sleepless" (2014), which charted in Sweden. They have also performed with Swedish progressive house DJ Avicii at a live show in New York City, on 27 September 2012 and again with Avicii as the guest act in Manchester on 20 February 2014. Early in 2015, the duo's collaboration with Terri B!, a song entitled, "Blind Heart", peaked at number one on the US Dance chart. On 31 March 2015, Cazzette announced their EP Desserts, which was released on 14 August 2015 release. They also announced the first single of the EP, "Together", released on 29 May 2015.

In 2016 Furrer announced that he stops touring with the act, only focusing on the production side.

== Discography ==
=== Albums ===
Title
Eject
Details
- Release date: 21 January 2014
- Label: PRMD, The Island Def Jam Music Group, UMG Recordings
Track listing

No.	Title	Length
1.	"On the Road"	4:00
2.	"Beam Me Up" (radio edit)	3:23
3.	"Run for Cover"	5:40
4.	"Hit Da Face"	6:14
5.	"Cream"	6:36
6.	"The Rat"	6:05
7.	"Beam Me Up"	6:45
8.	"Weapon"	3:09
9.	"Endorphine"	5:47
10.	"I Surrender"	6:31
11.	"Downfall"	6:43
12.	"The Coming"	7:22
13.	"Blood Theme"	5:40
14.	"F4t"	6:53

=== Extended plays ===
Title	Details	Track listing
Desserts	Release date: 28 August 2015; Label: ICONS Music, distributed by PRMD	No. / Title / Length; 1. / "Together" (featuring Newtimers) (radio edit) / 3:09; 2. / "Genius" / 3:36; 3. / "State of Bliss" / 3:08; 4. / "Solo Para Ti" / 3:44; 5. / "Dancing with Your Ghost" (featuring Sterling Fox) / 3:11; 6. / "State of Bliss" (Kill FM Remix) (radio edit) / 6:05
Time	Release date: 7 July 2017; Label: Kobalt Music, distributed by PRMD	No. / Title / Length; 1. / "Run the World" (featuring Nadia Gattas) / 2:56; 2. / "Just People" (featuring Karen Harding) / 2:56; 3. / "Oceans" (featuring Leo Stannard) / 3:15; 4. / "Handful of Gold" (featuring JONES) / 3:26; 5. / "Static" / 3:27
Stereo Mono	Release date: 17 August 2018; Label: ICONS Music, distributed by PRMD	No. / Title / Length; 1. / "In Time" (with Brando) / 3:11; 2. / "Old Habits" (featuring Amy Grace) / 3:15; 3. / "On My Mind" (featuring Richard Smitt) / 3:39; 4. / "Run Run" (featuring Morgan Bosman) / 3:43; 5. / "Missing You" (featuring Parson James) / 3:08

=== Singles ===
Year	Single	Peak chart positions			Album
Year	Single	SWE	DEN	NED	Album
2013	"Beam Me Up"	—	—	—	Eject
2013	"Weapon"	—	—	—	Eject
2013	"I Surrender" (featuring Niles Mason)	—	—	—	Eject
2013	"Shot At Night" (with The Killers)	—	—	—	Non-album single
2013	"Run for Cover"	—	—	—	Eject
2014	"Sleepless" (featuring The High)	24	39	33	Non-album singles
2014	"Blind Heart" (featuring Terri B!)	47	—	72	Non-album singles
2015	"Together" (featuring Newtimers)	98	—	—	Desserts
2015	"Genius" (featuring Buster Moe)	—	—	—	Desserts
2016	"She Wants Me Dead" (vs. AronChupa featuring The High)	—	—	—	Non-album singles
2016	"Blue Sky" (featuring Laleh)	—	—	—	Non-album singles
2016	"Static"	—	—	—	Non-album singles
2017	"Oceans" (featuring Leo Stannard)	—	—	—	Time
2017	"Handful Of Gold" (featuring Jones)	—	—	—	Time
2018	"Run Run" (featuring Morgan Bosman)	—	—	—	Stereo Mono
2018	"On My Mind" (featuring Richard Smitt)	—	—	—	Stereo Mono
2020	"Back & Forth" (featuring Galluxy)	--	--	--	Non-album single
"—" denotes a recording that did not chart or was not released.

=== Promotional singles ===
Year	Single	Peak chart positions			Album
Year	Single	SWE	DEN	NED	Album
2015	"Dancing with Your Ghost" (featuring Sterling Fox)	—	—	—	Desserts
2015	"Solo Para Ti"	—	—	—	Desserts
2015	"State of Bliss"	—	—	—	Desserts

== Remixes ==
Title	Year	Original artist(s)	Album
"Love Who Loves You Back"	2015	Tokio Hotel	Non-album remixes
"Serious"	2019	Midnight Kids (featuring Matthew Koma)	Non-album remixes
