= War Paint (Fletcher song) =

Single by Fletcher

from the EP Finding Fletcher
- Released: June 17, 2015
- Length: 3:45
- Label: Snapback Entertainment LLC
- Songwriters: Cari Fletcher; Jamie Kenney
- Producer: Jamie Kenney

Fletcher singles chronology
"War Paint" (2015)	"Live Young Die Free" (2015)

Music video
- "War Paint" on YouTube

"War Paint" is the debut single by American singer Fletcher. The song was released to digital outlets June 17, 2015. The song is the lead single from her debut EP titled Finding Fletcher. The song is written by Cari Fletcher and Jamie Kenney. The artist had envisioned the concept for the song before she began working with Kenney. They wrote and recorded "War Paint" in Nashville, Tennessee.

The song was released digitally only, but was also made available via music streaming service Spotify. It became a viral success and was listed as the most shared song on the application for two weeks. This attracted the attentions of mainstream media and "War Paint" surpassed 20 million streams in the months that followed. The artist has credited the song's coverage in Nylon magazine as being part of its success. The accompanying music video of "War Paint" was directed by Garen Barsegian. The song has received generally favourable reviews from music critics.

== Background and composition ==
"War Paint" is the first commercial work from the singer following her stint on reality television show and music competition The X Factor; where she competed as part of the girl group "Lakoda Rayne". It was the first single to be released commercially from her planned "Finding Fletcher" EP. Fletcher took a break from education to concentrate on her music career. She went to Nashville, Tennessee where she secured a writing session with Jamie Kenney. They co-wrote "War Paint" in their first session together, but Fletcher already had the concept of the song in mind. She believed it was a "killer concept" and had previously been undecided about keeping the song for herself or selling it to another artist. Fletcher has explained that her concept enabled the creation of a strong chorus. They then spent three days working on aspects of the hooks featured on "War Paint. Fletcher described the song as having "a beautiful meaning. It's so symbolic and colorful". Fletcher and Kenney loved the concept because it showcased who she is artistically. It was recorded in Marathon Village, Nashville. The song has a "fresh" production with the intention to create a new sound that also fits into the popular music genre. A banjo is one of the instruments used in the recording of "War Paint".

Fletcher has revealed that her song is about fighting for love and being unafraid to stand up for your beliefs without worrying about the consequences. She later told Mike Wass from Idolator that "it's about opening people's eyes to love and acceptance. Be who you are and love who love. Put your war paint on and don't ever stop fighting for what you believe in". After the release she returned to NYU to complete her degree while she continued to release a number of singles.

== Music video ==
The video for "War Paint" was released via the singer's YouTube account on July 8, 2015. The video was produced in a studio in Brooklyn, New York. It was filmed in one large room and took twelve hours to film. Garen Barsegian directed the video and Oleksii Babenko edited the video in post-production. Fletcher was directly involved with the creative process. Fletcher's friend Stephanie Troyak choreographed the video and other friends of the artist joined her on-set to perform dance routines. The choreography incorporated wild and in other parts, gentle dances. The video has a juxtaposition of both dark and colorful themes and Fletcher has described it as having a "cool vibe". The video includes neon tube lights as props and features multiple costume changes. Babenko impressed Fletcher with his editing of her backing dancers and managing to recreate her initial ideas for the visual.

Wass writing for Idolator said that the video's choreography was presented in a "fresh and original manner". But the critic criticized the lighting used in the visual, because they found it difficult to know what was happening in certain scenes.

== Critical reception ==
The song was included in an essential summer playlist article hosted via Billboard. Writer Jason Lipshutz opined that "War Paint" features "playful instrumentation and some whip-smart lyrical passages." Lauren Kruczyk writing for The Huffington Post branded it an "empowered song". Maxwell Losgar of Teen Vogue said that the song was a "home run" and "one of the summer's most unlikely pop hits." Bobby Olivier of NJ.com agreed with the Platten comparison, adding that the song is similar to Sara Bareilles' music. They added "it's hard to argue with the millions of Spotify listeners who chose to give her a try." Ilana Kaplan Vice magazine said branded "War Paint" an "anthemic, liberating hit" which remained true to Fletcher's ethos. Glamour magazine's Alexandra Schwartz called it a "contagious, punky pop song" which went viral fast.

Nylon's Hayden Manders gave the track a favourable review. He said that as soon as "War Paint" begins you know you will "experience something special". Praising Fletcher's vocal, Manders opined the song should be heard on high volume, noting it has "spitfire verses". They branded it a "summer jam", "percussion-heavy track" and "anthemic pop with introspection and soul." In 2016, Manders reflected on the song stating it was a "summer anthem". Adam Salandra of NewNowNext branded it a "catchy" and "upbeat single". He believed it would have been a perfect anthem for the campaign for gay marriage. Idolator's Wass said the song's "sing-a-long chorus" drew comparisons to the style of the band OneRepublic. He added it is a "rousing pop anthem" and praised the use of a banjo in the production. In another article the critic labelled it a "hype machine-conquering debut single" and "hook-filled anthem". Wass later concluded that Fletcher had made a "huge impression" with "the country-tinged pop track".

== Chart performance ==
The song was released to digital outlets June 17, 2015. The song went viral following the song's release to music streaming service Spotify. Associated Press reported it was the "most viral track" in the United States and third globally, for the week commencing June 29, 2015. With other 5 million streams the song stayed at the top of the list for two weeks and later amassed 20 million streams. The song was supported via Nylon magazine and Fletcher believed that the publications coverage of the single helped to make it successful. A remix titled "War Paint (Young Bombs Remix)" was later released to Spotify.

== Track listing ==
- Digital Download
1. "War Paint" – 3:45

== Release history ==
"War Paint" release history
Country	Date	Format
United States	June 17, 2015	Digital download
United Kingdom	June 17, 2015	Digital download
Japan	June 17, 2015	Digital download
Canada	June 17, 2015	Digital download
Australia	June 17, 2015	Digital download
France	June 17, 2015	Digital download
Germany	June 17, 2015	Digital download
