= Sleepless (Cazzette song) =

Single by Cazzette featuring The High
- Released: May 12, 2014
- Recorded: 2014
- Genre: Future house
- Length: 3:41 (Radio Edit); 4:43 (Club Edit)
- Label: PRMD
- Songwriter(s): Alexander Björklund; Sebastian Furrer; Arash Pornouri
- Producer(s): Cazzette; Arash Pornouri

Cazzette singles chronology
"Run For Cover" (2013)	"Sleepless" (2014)	"Blind Heart" (2014)

"Sleepless" is a single by Swedish electronic music duo Cazzette, featuring vocoder-processed vocals from UK artist The High. It was released on 12 May 2014.

== Release ==
The track was initially released on May 12 on Spotify and was released on Beatport, iTunes, and Amazon the next day on May 13. An EP entitled "Sleepless (Remixes I)" was also released on iTunes June 27, 2014 and on Beatport July 7, 2014.

== Track listing ==
Sleepless (feat. The High)
No.	Title	Length
1.	"Sleepless" (Radio Edit)	3:41
2.	"Sleepless" (Club Edit)	4:43

Sleepless (feat. The High) (Remixes I)
No.	Title	Length
1.	"Sleepless" (Oliver Nelson Remix)	3:37
2.	"Sleepless" (Prinston Acoustic Edit)	3:21
3.	"Sleepless" (Dear David Remix)	6:58
4.	"Sleepless" (Made in Norway Remix)	5:19
5.	"Sleepless" (A-Trak of Duck Sauce Remix)	5:37

Sleepless (feat. The High) (Remixes II)
No.	Title	Length
1.	"Sleepless" (Sneaker Snob Remix)	5:45

Sleepless (feat. The High) (Remixes III)
No.	Title	Length
1.	"Sleepless" (Ekonovah Remix)	3:53

== Charts ==
=== Weekly charts ===
Chart (2014)	Peak position
Czech Republic (Singles Digitál Top 100)	21
Denmark (Tracklisten)	39
Netherlands (Dutch Top 40)	21
Netherlands (Single Top 100)	33
Sweden (Sverigetopplistan)	24
US Hot Dance/Electronic Songs (Billboard)	14

=== Year-end charts ===
Chart (2014)	Position
Netherlands (Dutch Top 40)	96
US Hot Dance/Electronic Songs (Billboard)	46
