= You Ruined New York City for Me =

2019 EP by Fletcher

EP by Fletcher
- Released: August 16, 2019
- Length: 15:47
- Label: Capitol
- Producer: Malay

Fletcher chronology
Finding Fletcher (2016)	You Ruined New York City for Me (2019)	The S(ex) Tapes (2020)

Singles from You Ruined New York City for Me
- 1. "Undrunk" Released: January 25, 2019; 2. "If You're Gonna Lie" Released: April 26, 2019; 3. "About You" Released: May 24, 2019

You Ruined New York City for Me is the second extended play by American singer Fletcher, released on August 16, 2019 via Capitol Records. Although It did not chart in the United States, the lead single "Undrunk" became Fletcher's first song to chart on the Billboard Hot 100, peaking at number 61 in 2019.

== Background and inspiration ==
In an interview with Billboard, Fletcher explained that the title of You Ruined New York City for Me was inspired by her first major heartbreak, which left even the city itself feeling tainted by the relationship. The EP was described by her as "a page ripped out of my diary", written in real time as she processed the breakup. Its five tracks were conceived as a way of coping, each capturing different phases of the split, from the initial shock to reflection.

You Ruined New York City for Me marks Fletcher's first official release under Capitol Records, one year after signing with the label, and followed the commercial breakthrough of its lead single "Undrunk", which became her first entry on the Billboard Hot 100, peaking at number 61. She noted that the project's success felt significant in terms of queer representation, explaining, "If I can be that for somebody else, that's what success is, for me." Fletcher described You Ruined New York City for Me as documenting the fallout of a past toxic relationship in a "heart-on-my-sleeve" and "TMI" manner, with production from Malay. Its lead single, "Undrunk", explores the desire to undo a past relationship, a sentiment Fletcher noted resonated with many listeners; the track has been streamed over 100 million times worldwide, with fans responding to its honesty through social media messages.

== Critical reception ==
Melodic Magazine described You Ruined New York City for Me as an "honest look" at Fletcher's first love and heartbreak, praising her ability to be both "vulnerable and aggressive at the same time". The review highlighted the relatability of the tracks and her resilient vocals, calling the EP a strong introduction that demonstrates her gift for evocative songwriting.

== Track listing ==
You Ruined New York City for Me – Standard edition
No.	Title	Writer(s)	Producer(s)	Length
1.	"If You're Gonna Lie"	Amy Allen; Jeremy Dussolliet; Cari Fletcher; James Ho; Tim Sommers		3:23
2.	"Undrunk"	Allen; Dussolliet; Fletcher; Ho; Sommers		3:03
3.	"All Love"	Jennifer Decilveo; Fletcher; Ho		3:14
4.	"About You"	Ingrid Andress; Kara DioGuardi; Fletcher; Ho; Andrew Pruis; Derrick Southerland		3:03
5.	"Strangers"	Allen; Julian Bunetta; Fletcher; John Ryan	Ryan; Bunetta	3:04
Total length:				15:47

You Ruined New York City for Me – Extended edition
No.	Title	Writer(s)	Producer(s)	Length
6.	"Fuck You for Ruining New York City for Me"	Evan Bogart; Stephen "Koz" Kozmeniuk	Brandon Buttner	4:22
Total length:				20:09

=== Notes ===
- Credits were adapted from Apple Music.
- All songs were produced by Malay, except where noted.
