= Undrunk =

Single by Fletcher

from the EP You Ruined New York City for Me
- Released: January 25, 2019
- Genre: Synth-pop
- Length: 3:04
- Label: Capitol
- Songwriters: Cari Fletcher; Amy Allen; James Ho; Jeremy Dussolliet; Timothy Sommers
- Producer: Malay

Fletcher singles chronology
"I Believe You" (2018)	"Undrunk" (2019)	"If You're Gonna Lie" (2019)

Music video
- "Undrunk" on YouTube

"Undrunk" is a song by American singer-songwriter Fletcher. It was released on January 25, 2019, as the lead single from her second EP You Ruined New York City for Me (2019). The song, produced by Malay, became Fletcher's first song to chart.

== Background and concept ==
Prior to releasing the track, Fletcher visited iHeartRadio HQ in New York City to preview the song and share the personal story behind it. She described "Undrunk" as a "true and relatable testament" to her romantic experiences. During the interview, she also spoke about her long-standing journey in the music industry, her role as an ally to the LGBTQ community, and her hopes that her real-life stories would resonate with listeners anticipating her upcoming EP.

The concept for "Undrunk" emerged during a conversation Fletcher had in the studio, where she and her collaborators reflected on past relationships. She explained that the song was inspired by the desire to undo the experience of loving someone who had caused profound emotional damage. "We just started talking about our exes and what we had been through", she recalled. "The inspiration behind it is really just wishing you could undo loving that person that ruined your life, broke your heart into a million pieces, stomped on it, lit it on fire and then fucking ate it and threw it back up". The writing session revolved around questions like "What can you undo? Unkiss? Unlove? Unfuck?", with the melody naturally following those reflections.

Speaking about listeners' responses to the track, Fletcher added that she enjoyed hearing stories about how people relate to "Undrunk", often through humorous or emotionally raw moments after a night of drinking. Recalling one instance from college, she said, "One time I came home to my college roommate cooking an avocado — she literally cut an avocado and put Hershey's milk chocolate on it and put it in the microwave for like 16 minutes... I came in and was like, 'Are you good?' And she's like crying and sweating over the food". She noted that such bizarre drunk decisions reflect the emotional messiness at the heart of the song's message.

== Music video ==
The music video was released on February 13, 2019. It was co-directed by Emil Nava and Grace Pickering, and was produced by Ammolite. As of July 2021, the video has over 10 million views.

== Commercial performance ==
"Undrunk" was released in late January and quickly resonated with listeners, becoming the most-added song on Top 40 radio. On the Billboard Pop Songs chart dated February 16, 2019, it debuted at number 31 and later climbed to number 18. It has also been streamed more than 100 million times worldwide.

== Charts ==
"Undrunk" chart performance
Chart (2019)	Peak position
Canada Hot 100 (Billboard)	83
Ireland (IRMA)	65
New Zealand Hot Singles (Recorded Music NZ)	33
Slovakia Singles Digital (ČNS IFPI)	87
US Billboard Hot 100	61
US Dance Club Songs (Billboard)	8
US Pop Airplay (Billboard)	16
US Dance Airplay (Billboard)	32

== Certifications ==
"Undrunk" certifications
Region	Certification	Certified units/sales
Canada (Music Canada)	Gold	40,000^{‡}
United States (RIAA)	Platinum	1,000,000^{‡}
^{‡} Sales+streaming figures based on certification alone.
