= Falling (Trevor Daniel song) =

2018 single by American singer Trevor Daniel

Single by Trevor Daniel

from the EP Homesick and the album Nicotine
- Released: October 5, 2018
- Recorded: 2018
- Genre: R&B; hip hop; alternative R&B
- Length: 2:39
- Label: Alamo; Internet Money; Interscope
- Songwriters: Trevor Neill; Tristan Norton; Martin Kottmeier; Kim Candilora; Danny Snodgrass, Jr.; Ryan Vojtesak
- Producers: KC Supreme; Taz Taylor; Charlie Handsome

Trevor Daniel singles chronology
"Drive" (2018)	"Falling" (2018)	"Trouble" (2019)

Music video
- "Falling" on YouTube

"Falling" is a song by American singer Trevor Daniel, released as the lead single from his debut extended play (EP) Homesick (2018) and his debut studio album Nicotine (2020), by Alamo Records, Internet Money Records, and Interscope Records on October 5, 2018. The song was produced by KC Supreme, Taz Taylor and Charlie Handsome. A year later, the song started gaining popularity on short-form mobile videos platform TikTok and subsequently was added on various Spotify playlists and Viral Charts. It is his first charting single on the US Billboard Hot 100, and peaked at number 17. On January 15, 2020, a music video was released.

== Background and composition ==
The song was conceived in "a matter of hours" during Daniel's first studio session with record producer Taz Taylor, whose record label, Internet Money, Daniel was previously signed to with Alamo and Interscope in July 2018. Daniel recalls that they attempted to add a second verse to the song, but decided against it, because "the energy just wasn't the same". The rough cut was released as the official song.

== Music video ==
In 2018, Daniel released an initial music video which he described as "more of a short film to me than just a music video, and I'm excited to share my visions with everyone". The video was shot and edited by Mateo Mejia and Esteban Caicedo.

With the success of the song, a new official music video was filmed in 2019. It was directed by William Desena and officially premiered on January 15, 2020.

== Charts ==
=== Weekly charts ===
2019–2020 weekly chart performance
Chart (2019–2020)	Peak position
Australia (ARIA)	13
Austria (Ö3 Austria Top 40)	7
Belgium (Ultratop 50 Flanders)	22
Belgium (Ultratop 50 Wallonia)	34
Canada Hot 100 (Billboard)	13
Canada CHR/Top 40 (Billboard)	6
CIS Airplay (TopHit)	9
Czech Republic Singles Digital (ČNS IFPI)	4
Denmark (Tracklisten)	23
Estonia (Eesti Tipp-40)	6
Finland (Suomen virallinen lista)	5
France (SNEP)	21
Germany (GfK)	13
Global 200 (Billboard)	94
Global Excl. US (Billboard)	128
Greece International (IFPI)	3
Hungary (Stream Top 40)	2
Iceland (Tónlistinn)	18
Ireland (IRMA)	12
Italy (FIMI)	17
Latvia Streaming (LAIPA)	1
Lithuania (AGATA)	9
Malaysia (RIM)	2
Mexico Airplay (Billboard)	44
Netherlands (Single Top 100)	11
New Zealand (Recorded Music NZ)	17
Norway (VG-lista)	5
Romania (Airplay 100)	42
Russia Airplay (TopHit)	7
Scottish Singles Sales (Official Charts)	52
Singapore (RIAS)	5
Slovakia Singles Digital (ČNS IFPI)	7
Spain (Promusicae)	54
Sweden (Sverigetopplistan)	15
Switzerland (Schweizer Hitparade)	11
Ukraine Airplay (TopHit)	22
UK Singles (Official Charts)	14
UK Indie (Official Charts)	1
UK Hip Hop/R&B (Official Charts)	7
US Billboard Hot 100	17
US Adult Pop Airplay (Billboard)	32
US Hot R&B/Hip-Hop Songs (Billboard)	11
US Pop Airplay (Billboard)	1
US Rhythmic Airplay (Billboard)	16
US Rolling Stone Top 100	10

2026 weekly chart performance
Chart (2026)	Peak position
Latvia Airplay (TopHit)	46

=== Monthly charts ===
Monthly chart performance
Chart (2026)	Peak position
Latvia Airplay (TopHit)	74

=== Year-end charts ===
Chart (2020)	Position
Australia (ARIA)	41
Austria (Ö3 Austria Top 40)	31
Belgium (Ultratop Flanders)	55
Belgium (Ultratop Wallonia)	86
Canada (Canadian Hot 100)	19
CIS (Tophit)	26
Denmark (Tracklisten)	71
France (SNEP)	47
Germany (Official German Charts)	41
Hungary (Stream Top 40)	18
Italy (FIMI)	73
Netherlands (Single Top 100)	46
New Zealand (Recorded Music NZ)	35
Russia Airplay (Tophit)	19
Sweden (Sverigetopplistan)	50
Switzerland (Schweizer Hitparade)	35
UK Singles (OCC)	79
US Billboard Hot 100	22
US Hot R&B/Hip-Hop Songs (Billboard)	18
US Mainstream Top 40 (Billboard)	12

Chart (2021)	Position
CIS (Tophit)	147
Russia Airplay (Tophit)	102

== Certifications ==
Region	Certification	Certified units/sales
Australia (ARIA)	2× Platinum	140,000^{‡}
Belgium (BRMA)	Platinum	40,000^{‡}
Brazil (Pro-Música Brasil)	2× Diamond	320,000^{‡}
Denmark (IFPI Danmark)	Platinum	90,000^{‡}
France (SNEP)	Platinum	200,000^{‡}
Germany (BVMI)	Platinum	400,000^{‡}
Italy (FIMI)	Platinum	70,000^{‡}
New Zealand (RMNZ)	3× Platinum	90,000^{‡}
Poland (ZPAV)	2× Platinum	100,000^{‡}
Spain (Promusicae)	Platinum	60,000^{‡}
United Kingdom (BPI)	Platinum	600,000^{‡}
United States (RIAA)	4× Platinum	4,000,000^{‡}
Streaming
Greece (IFPI Greece)	Platinum	2,000,000^{†}
^{‡} Sales+streaming figures based on certification alone.^{†} Streaming-only figures based on certification alone.

== Release history ==
Region	Date	Format	Label	Ref.
Various	October 5, 2018	Digital download; streaming	Alamo Records; Internet Money	
United Kingdom	December 20, 2019	Contemporary hit radio	Alamo Records; Internet Money	
United States	January 14, 2020	Contemporary hit radio	Alamo Records; Interscope	
