= Becky's So Hot =

2022 single by Fletcher

Single by Fletcher

from the album Girl of My Dreams
- Released: July 20, 2022
- Length: 2:43
- Label: Capitol
- Songwriters: Cari Fletcher; Kyle Buckley; Jeremy Dussolliet; Lena Katina; Tim Sommers; Юлия Волкова
- Producers: Pink Slip; Tim Sommers

Fletcher singles chronology
"Her Body Is Bible" (2022)	"Becky's So Hot" (2022)	"Sting" (2022)

Music video
- "Becky's So Hot" on YouTube

"Becky's So Hot" is a song by American singer and songwriter Fletcher. It was released as the second single from her debut studio album Girl of My Dreams, on July 20, 2022. As of September 2022, the song has peaked at number 31 on the US Billboard Hot Rock & Alternative Songs chart.

== Music video ==
The official music video for "Becky's So Hot" was directed by Millicent Hailes and features Bella Thorne as Fletcher's love interest. The video depicts scenes involving Fletcher and Thorne and was released as part of the song's promotional compaign. Its visual narrative incorporates the relationship between the two characters portrayed in the video.

== Charts ==
Chart performance for "Becky's So Hot"
Chart (2022)	Peak position
US Hot Rock & Alternative Songs (Billboard)	31
