= Girl of My Dreams (album) =

2022 studio album by Fletcher

- Standard cover

Studio album by Fletcher
- Released: September 16, 2022
- Genre: Pop
- Length: 37:13
- Label: Capitol
- Producer: Jennifer Decilveo; Falconry; Alex Hope; Kito; Malay; Ryan Marrone; Marshmello; One Love; Ali Payami; Pink Slip; Jesse Shatkin; Sly

Fletcher chronology
The S(ex) Tapes (2020)	Girl of My Dreams (2022)	In Search of the Antidote (2024)

Singles from Girl of My Dreams
- 1. "Her Body Is Bible" Released: June 24, 2022; 2. "Becky's So Hot" Released: July 20, 2022; 3. "Sting" Released: September 2, 2022; 4. "Better Version" Released: September 9, 2022

Girl of My Dreams is the debut studio album by American singer-songwriter Fletcher, released on September 16, 2022, via Capitol Records. Several singles were released from the album, including "Her Body Is Bible", "Becky's So Hot", "Sting", and "Better Version" featuring Kelsea Ballerini. A deluxe edition followed on November 18, 2022, supported by the single "Suckerpunch" and the previously released "Healing".

The album received generally favorable reviews from critics, with a Metacritic score of 73. Some critics praised its emotional honesty, sonic variety, and exploration of self-love and healing, while others found its songwriting occasionally lacking in depth or nuance.

== Singles ==
Four singles have been released from Girl of My Dreams: "Her Body Is Bible", "Becky's So Hot", "Sting" and "Better Version" with Kelsea Ballerini. A deluxe edition of the album was released on November 18, 2022, which was promoted by the single "Suckerpunch" as well as the previously released single, "Healing".

== Critical reception ==
Girl of My Dreams ratings
Aggregate scores
Source	Rating
Metacritic	73/100
Review scores
Source	Rating
Clash	8/10
Dork	4/5 stars
Gigwise	9/10 stars
The Line of Best Fit	7/10
Pitchfork	5.9/10

Girl of My Dreams received generally favorable reviews from critics. At Metacritic, which assigns a normalized rating out of 100 to reviews from professional publications, the album received a weighted average score of 73, indicating "generally favorable reviews".

Shannon Garner of Clash called the album a "chaotic, unfiltered project that unpacks and tackles insecurities head-on" and "an intense rollercoaster of supercharged pop but even in its painful moments, the record radiates an undeniable hope". Dork praised the album as a pop record filled with raw emotion and sonic variety, noting how Fletcher moves seamlessly between explosive anthems and delicate ballads, showcasing her multidimensional artistry. Gigwise described it as a bold, emotionally transparent album infused with pop-punk energy, celebrating self-love and liberation. The review highlighted Fletcher's role in bringing WLW pop into the mainstream. The Line of Best Fit called the album a candid and fearless journey through heartbreak, chaos, healing, self-acceptance, and self-love, rooted in Fletcher's personal experiences and introspection. Writing for Pitchfork, Dani Blum was more critical, stating that Fletcher's songwriting on Girl of My Dreams "hides behind concerted confessions" and she "assigns clunky labels to her emotions without interrogating or even fully articulating them".

== Track listing ==
Girl of My Dreams – Standard edition
No.	Title	Writer(s)	Length
1.	"Sting"	Jennifer Decilveo; Cari Fletcher; Ali Payami; Wens	3:07
2.	"Guess We Lied..."	Amy Allen; Jeremy Dussolliet; Fletcher; Ho; Timothy Sommers	2:31
3.	"Birthday Girl"	Fletcher; Ryan Marrone; JP Saxe	3:16
4.	"Becky's So Hot"	Buckley; Dussolliet; Fletcher; Sommers	2:42
5.	"Better Version"	Dussolliet; Fletcher; Sommers	2:53
6.	"Conversations"	Fletcher; Jacob Kasher; Madison Love; Christopher Comstock; Michael Pollack	3:04
7.	"Serial Heartbreaker"	Decilveo; Fletcher; Ho	2:13
8.	"Her Body Is Bible"	Fletcher; Phil Plested; Sylvester Sivertsen; Jake Torrey	2:57
9.	"I Think I'm Growing?"	Ingrid Andress; Fletcher; Jesse Shatkin	1:32
10.	"Girl of My Dreams"	Decilveo; Fletcher; Wens; Payami	3:32
11.	"Holiday"	Buckley; Fletcher; Mary Weitz	3:13
12.	"I Love You, Bitch"	Fletcher; Ho; Alex Hope; Maaike Lebbing	2:53
13.	"For Cari"	Fletcher; Maureen McDonald; Shatkin	3:20
Total length:			37:13

Girl of My Dreams – Deluxe edition
No.	Title	Writer(s)	Length
1.	"20 Something"	Fletcher; Jonny Hockings; Lauren Aquilina	3:33
2.	"I Think I'm Growing?"	Andress; Fletcher; Shatkin	1:32
3.	"Girl of My Dreams"	Decilveo; Fletcher; Wens; Payami	3:32
4.	"Healing"	Fletcher; Scott Harris; Gregory Hein	3:08
5.	"Suckerpunch"	Fletcher; Elizabeth Boland; Connor McDonough; Riley McDonough	2:18
6.	"Birthday Girl"	Fletcher; Marrone; Saxe	3:16
7.	"Better Version"	Dussolliet; Fletcher; Sommers	2:53
8.	"Sting"	Decilveo; Fletcher; Payami; Wens	3:07
9.	"Becky's So Hot"	Buckley; Dussolliet; Fletcher; Sommers	2:42
10.	"Conversations"	Fletcher; Kasher; Love; Comstock; Pollack	3:04
11.	"Guess We Lied..."	Allen; Dussolliet; Fletcher; Ho; Sommers	2:31
12.	"Serial Heartbreaker"	Decilveo; Fletcher; Ho	2:13
13.	"Holiday"	Buckley; Fletcher; Weitz	3:13
14.	"Her Body Is Bible"	Fletcher; Plested; Sivertsen; Torrey	2:57
15.	"I Love You, Bitch"	Fletcher; Ho; Hope; Lebbing	2:53
16.	"For Cari"	Fletcher; McDonald; Shatkin	3:20
17.	"Better Version" (featuring Kelsea Ballerini)	Dussolliet; Fletcher; Sommers; Ballerini	2:54
Total length:			52:15

Girl of My Dreams – Target edition
No.	Title	Writer(s)	Length
14.	"Fuckboy"	Fletcher; Ho; Oliver Peterhof; Love	2:15
15.	"Riot"	Fletcher; Ignacio Cubina; McDonald; Stolinski Williams	2:40

Girl of My Dreams – Wet Dream edition
No.	Title	Writer(s)	Length
14.	"20 Something"	Fletcher; Jonny Hockings; Aquilina	3:33
15.	"Pussy Is Bible (Demo)"		2:58

== Charts ==
Chart performance for Girl of My Dreams
Chart (2022)	Peak position
Australian Albums (ARIA)	42
Austrian Albums (Ö3 Austria)	75
Belgian Albums (Ultratop Flanders)	16
Belgian Albums (Ultratop Wallonia)	66
Dutch Albums (Album Top 100)	35
German Albums (Offizielle Top 100)	45
Irish Albums (IRMA)	77
New Zealand Albums (RMNZ)	9
Scottish Albums (OCC)	18
UK Albums (OCC)	44
US Billboard 200	15
