= The S(ex) Tapes =

EP by Fletcher
- Released: September 9, 2020
- Length: 21:32
- Label: Capitol
- Producer: James Ho; Kito; Jennifer Decilveo

Fletcher chronology
You Ruined New York City for Me (2019)	The S(ex) Tapes (2020)	Girl of My Dreams (2022)

Singles from The S(ex) Tapes
- 1. "Bitter" Released: May 13, 2020; 2. "If I Hated You" Released: August 12, 2020; 3. "Feel" Released: August 21, 2020; 4. "The One" Released: September 4, 2020

The S(ex) Tapes is the third extended play by American singer Fletcher, released on September 9, 2020, via Capitol Records. Four singles were released from The S(ex) Tapes: "Bitter", "If I Hated You", "Feel" and "The One".

== Background ==
The S(ex) Tapes was created during quarantine and documents Fletcher's four-year relationship with her ex-partner, YouTuber Shannon Beveridge. The project was conceived as an intimate portrayal of their turbulent romance, with Beveridge directing its accompanying videos. Fletcher described the EP as showing her in her "most vulnerable form", pairing candid lyrics such as "I just had sex with my ex in a New York apartment" with raw, homemade visuals. The result was intended as an immersive package that stripped away polished pop aesthetics in favor of something more personal and unfiltered.

== Promotion ==
=== Singles ===
"Bitter" was released as the lead single of the album in May 13, 2020. The second single, "If I Hated You", was released in August 12, alongside its music video shot by her ex-partner. "Feel" and "The One" were released as third and fourth single in August 21 and September 4, respectively.

== Track listing ==
The S(ex) Tapes track listing
No.	Title	Writer(s)	Length
1.	"Silence"	Caroline Ailin; Fletcher; James Ho; Emily Warren	2:36
2.	"If I Hated You"	Fletcher; Ho; Maureen McDonald	3:34
3.	"Bitter"	Fletcher; Maaike Lebbing; Mary Weitz	3:15
4.	"The One"	Noonie Bao; Fletcher; Ho	3:02
5.	"Shh...Don't Say It"	Fletcher; Ho; Caroline Pennell	2:49
6.	"Feel"	Jennifer Decilveo; Fletcher; Caitlyn Smith	3:03
7.	"Sex (With My Ex)"	Fletcher; Ho; Ilsey Juber	3:13
Total length:			21:32
