= Fletcher (singer) =

American pop singer (born 1994)

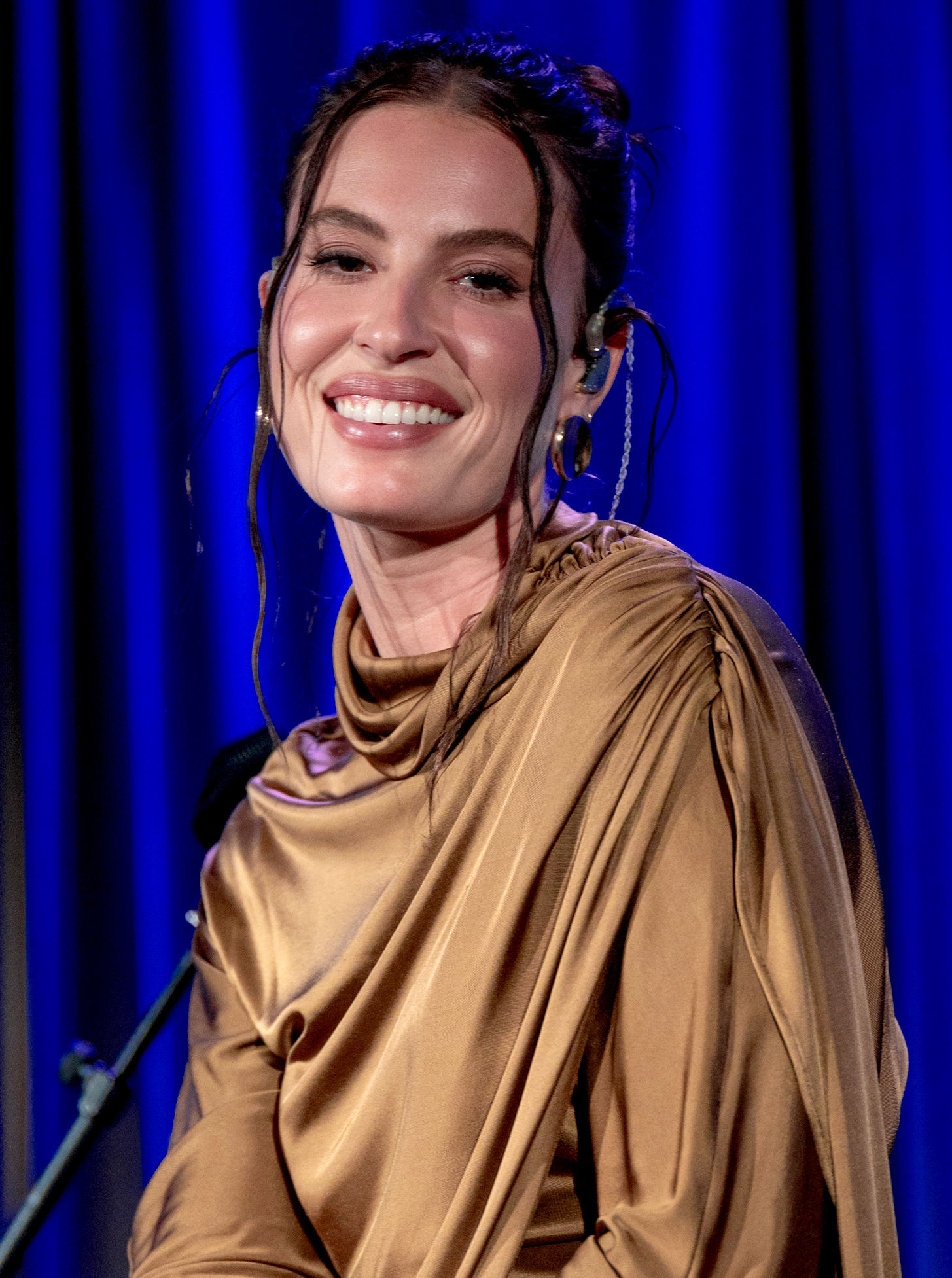
- Fletcher at the Grammy Museum in Los Angeles, October 2024
- Born: Cari Elise Fletcher; March 19, 1994 (age 32); Asbury Park, New Jersey, US
- Other name: Cari Fletcher
- Education: New York University
- Occupations: Singer; songwriter
- Years active: 2015–present
- Notable work: Discography
- Musical career
- Genre: Pop
- Instruments: Vocals; guitar; piano
- Label: Capitol
- Website: findingfletcher.com

Cari Elise Fletcher (born March 19, 1994), known mononymously by her last name (stylized in all caps), is an American singer. Her breakthrough song "Undrunk", released in 2019, was her first single to chart on the U.S Billboard Hot 100. "Undrunk" was released on January 25, 2019, as the lead single of her second extended play (EP), You Ruined New York City for Me (2019).

Fletcher's debut single as a solo artist, "War Paint", was released in 2015. Her 2016 single, "Wasted Youth", reached No. 1 on Billboard's Emerging Artist Chart. Fletcher was included on Forbes's 2022 30 under 30 list. She released her debut album, Girl of My Dreams, in 2022. In March 2024, she released her second album In Search of the Antidote. In July 2025, she released her third album Would You Still Love Me If You Really Knew Me?

== Early life ==
Fletcher was born in Asbury Park, New Jersey, to Bob and Noreen (née Napolitani) Fletcher; her father owned several car dealerships and her mother was a flight attendant. She began taking vocal lessons at the age of five. Fletcher has a younger brother.

In 2012, Fletcher graduated from Wall High School in nearby Wall Township, New Jersey, where she played women's volleyball. Upon graduating high school, she attended the Clive Davis Institute of Recorded Music at New York University (NYU). She took a year-long leave of absence and moved to Nashville, Tennessee, to pursue music full time. She completed NYU in 2016. She is currently based in Los Angeles.

== Career ==
In 2011, Fletcher competed on the premiere season of The X Factor. In the boot camp round, Simon Cowell paired Fletcher with Hayley Orrantia, Paige Elizabeth Ogle, and Dani Knights to form the group Lakoda Rayne under mentorship of Paula Abdul. They disbanded after being eliminated from the competition. In 2015, she moved to Nashville, Tennessee and began collaborating with producer Jamie Kenney, during which the single "War Paint" was released. The song went viral on Spotify after its release. In 2016, Spotify added Fletcher to their Spotify Spotlight list, helping catapult her as an independent artist. She was invited to speak on behalf of the company at Fortune Tech Conference in 2019 as a success story. In September 2016, she released her debut EP Finding Fletcher independently.

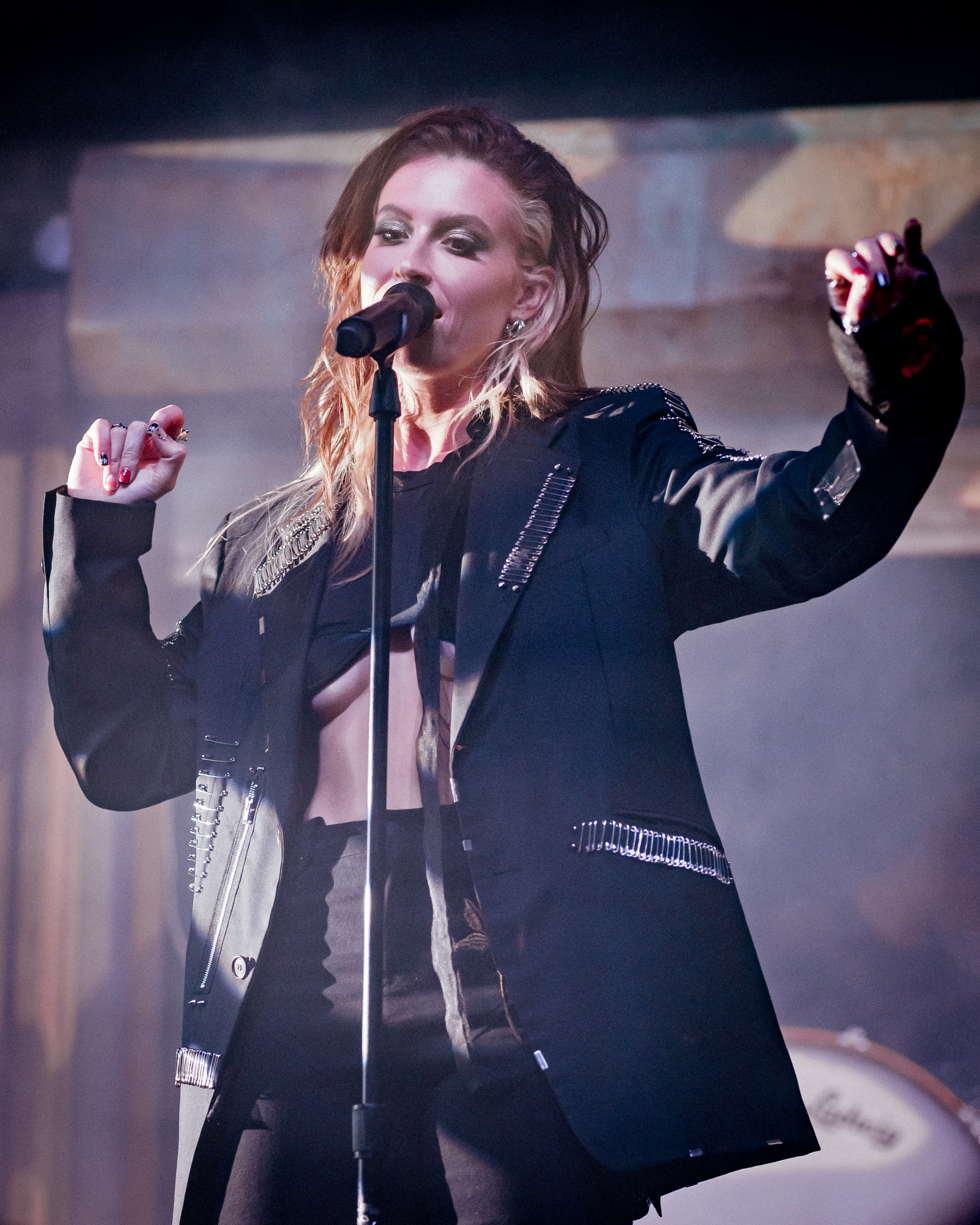
Fletcher performing in 2022

In August 2018, Fletcher announced that she had signed with Capitol Records, which is based in Los Angeles. She released her single "Undrunk" on January 25, 2019, and subsequently made her television debut on The Tonight Show Starring Jimmy Fallon. She also performed at Bonnaroo Music Festival, Life Is Beautiful Music & Art Festival, Lollapalooza that year.

In April 2019, she released "If You're Gonna Lie", marketed as a prequel to "Undrunk" and "About You", another single about the same ex. In August 2019, Fletcher released her second EP You Ruined New York City for Me, with all prior releases along with two new songs, "All Love" and "Strangers". In October 2019, Fletcher was announced as an opening act for Niall Horan's Nice to Meet Ya Tour, set to begin in 2020 before it was canceled due to the COVID-19 pandemic.

In September 2020, Fletcher released her EP, The S(ex) Tapes, which shares the raw aftermath of a breakup. She later released "Cherry" with Hayley Kiyoko, which Elle called "luscious, flirtatious, but fun".

On September 16, 2022, she released her debut album, Girl of My Dreams, which debuted at number fifteen on the US Billboard 200. On March 22, 2024, she released her sophomore album, In Search of the Antidote, which debuted at number three on the US Billboard Top Album Sales charts.

== Personal life ==
Fletcher has said that her ancestry is mostly German. Her paternal grandparents immigrated to the United States from Germany, where their last name was incorrectly anglicized from the German 'Fleischhauer' (the English equivalent is Butcher) to the English last name 'Fletcher', possibly due to its phonetic similarity. On a video, Fletcher stated that her family last name was 'Fleischhauer' but changed to 'Fletcher' and was shocked when informed that Fleischhauer was actually the German equivalent of 'Butcher'. Fletcher released "I Believe You" in support of sexual assault survivors in March 2018, penning a #MeToo-inspired letter to Billboard. She supported the movement with appearances at It's On Us and the United State of Women Summit. She's also participated in Girl Up and the Teen Vogue Summit in support of women's empowerment efforts.

Fletcher is a member of the LGBTQ+ community, and actively supports organizations such as GLAAD, The Trevor Project and It Gets Better. In March 2017, she told Billboard "I definitely identify within the LGBTQ community, but as far as putting a label on like gay, straight, bisexual, lesbian, queer... it's all in the family and spectrum, and sexuality and gender is not black and white. It's a spectrum that we all fall somewhere in the world on. That's how I feel comfortable expressing myself – loving who I feel like loving and who I'm attracted to." In December 2021, Fletcher stated that she identifies as queer and that she is "attracted to strong feminine energy which [sic] just so happens to more likely than not be women".

From 2016 to 2020, Fletcher dated YouTuber Shannon Beveridge. In 2017, Beveridge starred in the music video for her single "Wasted Youth". Fletcher's third EP The S(ex) Tapes, released in 2020, was inspired by the aftermath of their breakup. Beveridge filmed and directed all of the music videos for the EP, including "Sex (With My Ex)". In July 2022, Fletcher released the single "Becky's So Hot" about Beveridge's then-girlfriend. In 2023 after falling ill, Fletcher was diagnosed with Lyme disease. On June 5, 2025, upon releasing her new single "Boy", Fletcher revealed she is dating a man.

== Influences ==
Growing up, she was inspired by vocalists like Celine Dion, Mariah Carey, and Whitney Houston. She cited Bob Marley, and fellow New Jersey artists Bruce Springsteen, Bon Jovi, and Patti Smith as influences. Fletcher has also expressed admiration for Taylor Swift, Madonna, Lady Gaga, Amy Winehouse, Alanis Morissette, and Troye Sivan.

== Discography ==
- Girl of My Dreams (2022)
- In Search of the Antidote (2024)
- Would You Still Love Me If You Really Knew Me? (2025)

== Filmography ==
=== Television ===
List of television appearances and roles
Year	Title	Notes	Ref.
2011	The X Factor	Contestant	
2022	The L Word: Generation Q	Herself; Episode: "Little Boxes"	
2022	Miley's New Year's Eve Party	Herself	

== Tours ==
Headline

- Finding Fletcher Tour (2017)
- You Ruined New York City For Me Tour (2019)
- Fletcher 2020 Tour (2020), postponed due to COVID-19
- Girl of My Dreams Tour (2022)
- In Search of the Antidote Tour (2024)
- For the first and final time (intimate shows 2025)

Supporting

- LANY – Malibu Nights World Tour (2019)
- Panic! at the Disco – Viva Las Vengeance Tour Europe 2023

== Awards and nominations ==
Year	Association	Category	Nominated work	Result	Ref
2020	iHeartRadio Music Awards	Best New Pop Artist	Herself	Nominated	
2021	GLAAD Media Awards	Outstanding Breakthrough Music Artist	Herself	Nominated	
2023	MTV Europe Music Awards	Best Push Act	Herself	Nominated	
2023	GLAAD Media Awards	Outstanding Music Artist	Herself	Won	
2023	MTV Video Music Awards	Push Performance of The Year	"Becky's So Hot"	Nominated	
