= The Voice (American TV series) discography =

The Voice is an American television music competition to find singing talent amongst all genres of music, regardless of age, and accepts contestants of minor professional background. Its inaugural season was completed in June 2011 and has been broadcast biannually from 2012. The winners and finalists of the seasons have seen varied levels of success with musical releases. Musical releases before their participation on the show are not included in the list.

== Singles during The Voice ==
In a first for a music competition series, NBC and Universal Republic Records (later moved to Republic Records in 2012) offered fans of the show the ability to vote for their favorite artists by purchasing the studio versions of the songs that they perform on the live show each week via the iTunes Store. Only studio versions, not the live version, of its participants' performances are available for download on iTunes. Hot Digital Songs information is included as a rough gauge on the actual sales figures for the songs.

There is generally a studio version released for every song on The Voice by its contestants, except for the Battle Rounds and the Knockout segment of the show. In the first season, the battle rounds were recorded in the studio with both artists in the pairing. However, from season two onwards, only the winner's version of the song from the battle round is released. With the introduction of the Knockout Rounds in season three, where each contestant from the pairing sang a separate song, only the winner's single is released.

=== Hot 100 singles ===
Hot 100 singles per season
Season 1	16
Season 2	7
Season 3	10
Season 4	13
Season 5	4
Season 6	6
Season 7	12

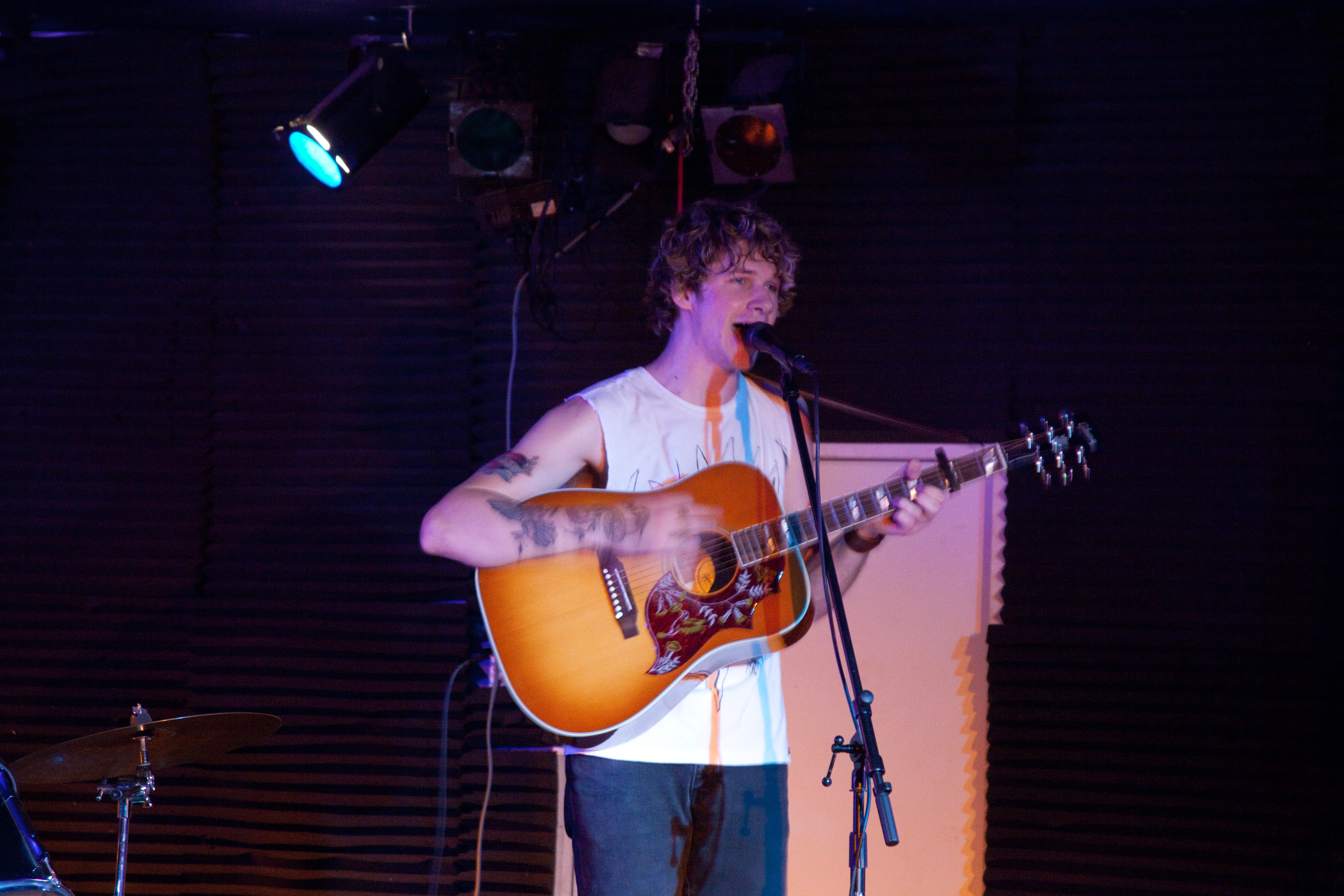
Matt McAndrew holds the record for highest-charting single, and the record for biggest selling single in the first week of release, with "Wasted Love", which sold 209,000 copies in the U.S.

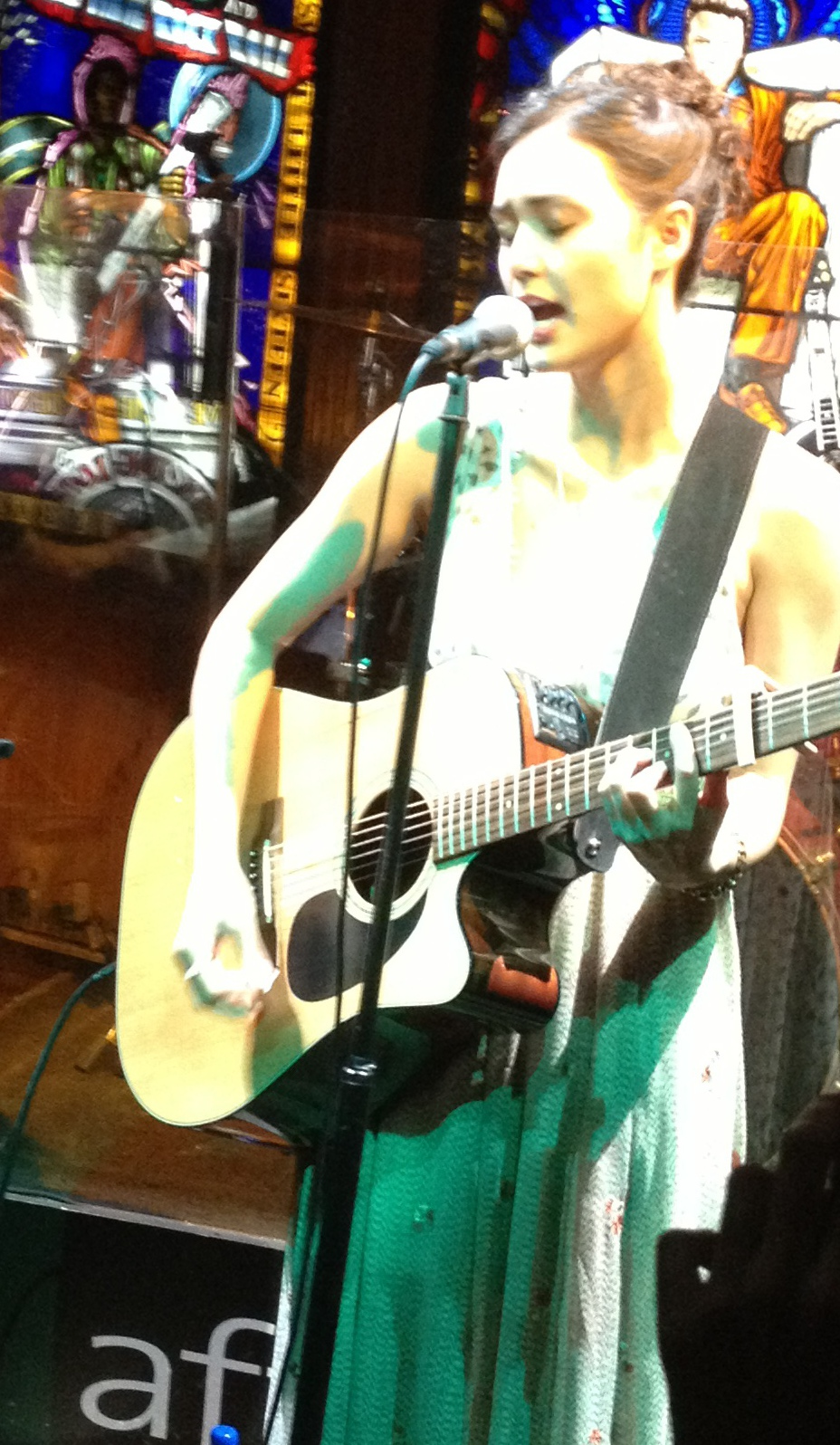
Dia Frampton holds the record for longest charting single with her rendition of "Heartless", which ran for four weeks.

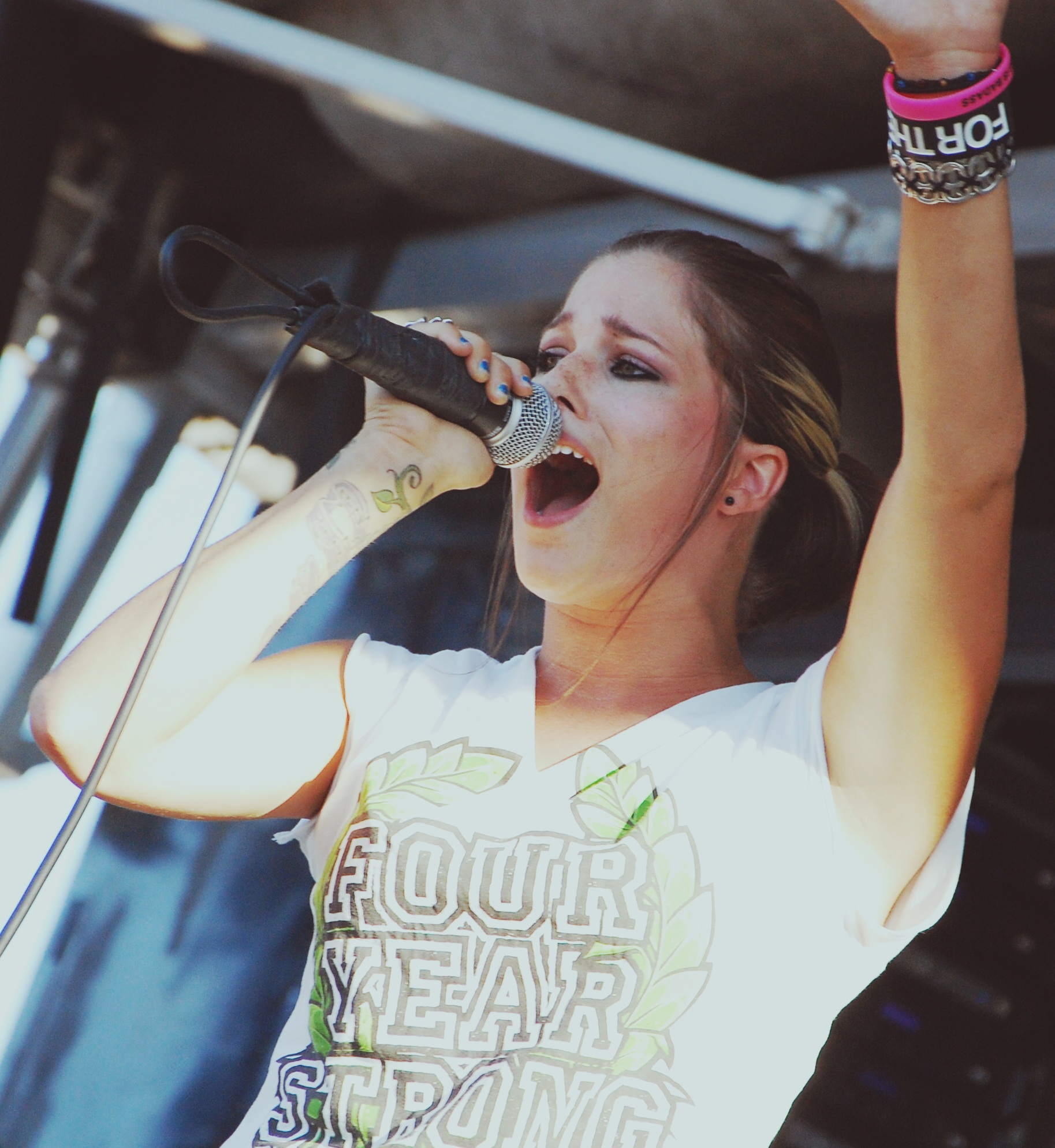
Cassadee Pope holds the record for highest selling single with her rendition of "Over You", which has sold over 340,000 copies. She also holds the record for highest selling single after The Voice, as "Wasting All These Tears" has gone Platinum, selling 1,013,000 copies in the U.S.Until she was eclipsed by Whiskey Glasses by Morgan Wallen which is certified 3× Platinum in the U.S.

The following songs that were sung on The Voice have charted on the Billboard Hot 100 chart.

Entry date	Show segment	Single	Artist	Peak	Weeks on chart	Hot Digital Songs peak	iTunes bonus	Ref
Season 1
May 14, 2011	Blind Auditions	"Time After Time"	Javier Colon (Winner)	65	1	41	—N/a	
June 25, 2011	Quarter-finals	"Heartless"	Dia Frampton (2nd place)	57	4	30	—N/a	
July 2, 2011	Quarter-finals	"Angel"	Javier Colon	64	1	35	—N/a	
July 2, 2011	Quarter-finals	"Jolene"	Vicci Martinez (3rd/4th place)	76	1	50	—N/a	
July 2, 2011	Quarter-finals	"Black Horse and the Cherry Tree"	Casey Weston (5th–8th place)	90	1	70	—N/a	
July 2, 2011	Quarter-finals	"Price Tag"^{[A]}	Xenia (5th–8th place)	99	1	—	—N/a	
July 9, 2011	Semi-finals	"Fix You"	Javier Colon	52	2	26	—N/a	
July 9, 2011	Semi-finals	"Losing My Religion"	Dia Frampton	54	2	28	—N/a	
July 9, 2011	Semi-finals	"Dog Days Are Over"	Vicci Martinez	68	1	43	—N/a	
July 9, 2011	Semi-finals	"The Man Who Can't Be Moved"	Xenia	92	1	68	—N/a	
July 16, 2011	Finals	"Stitch by Stitch" (original)	Javier Colon	17	2	6	—N/a	
July 16, 2011	Finals	"Inventing Shadows" (original)	Dia Frampton	20	1	7	—N/a	
July 16, 2011	Finals	"Man In the Mirror"	Javier Colon with coach, Adam Levine	45	1	24	—N/a	
July 16, 2011	Finals	"I Won't Back Down"	Dia Frampton with coach, Blake Shelton	57	1	33	—N/a	
July 16, 2011	Finals	"Beautiful"	Beverly McClellan (3rd/4th place) with coach, Christina Aguilera	74	1	52	—N/a	
July 16, 2011	Finals	"Afraid to Sleep" (original)	Vicci Martinez	78	1	53	—N/a	
Season 2
February 25, 2012	Blind Auditions	"Say Aah"	Lindsey Pavao (5th–8th place)	80	1	62	—N/a	
April 28, 2012	Live Rounds	"Roxanne"	Juliet Simms (2nd place)	86	1	48	—N/a	
May 19, 2012	Semi-finals	"It's a Man's Man's Man's World"	Juliet Simms	70	1	20	—N/a	
May 26, 2012	Finals	"99 Problems"	Tony Lucca (3rd place)	58	1	16	—N/a	
May 26, 2012	Finals	"Yesterday"	Tony Lucca with coach, Adam Levine	68	1	22	—N/a	
May 26, 2012	Finals	"I Believe I Can Fly"	Jermaine Paul (Winner)	83	1	32	—N/a	
May 26, 2012	Finals	"The Prayer"	Chris Mann (4th place) with coach, Christina Aguilera	85	1	34	—N/a	
Season 3
December 8, 2012	Top 10 Perform Live	"Over You"^{[B]}	Cassadee Pope (Winner)	25	2*	3	^{x2}	
December 8, 2012	Top 10 Perform Live	"Seven Nation Army"	Melanie Martinez (5th/6th place)	86	1	30	check	
December 8, 2012	Top 10 Perform Live	"Stars"	Amanda Brown (5th/6th place)	97	1	56		
December 15, 2012	Top 8 Perform Live	"Too Close"	Melanie Martinez	94	1	27	check	
December 15, 2012	Top 8 Perform Live	"Are You Happy Now?"	Cassadee Pope	95	1	28	check	
December 22, 2012	Quarter-finals	"I Want to Know What Love Is"	Terry McDermott (2nd place)	84	1	25	check	
December 22, 2012	Quarter-finals	"Somewhere Over the Rainbow"	Nicholas David (3rd place)	96	1	30	check	
December 29, 2012	Semi-finals	"Stupid Boy"	Cassadee Pope	40	1	6	check	
December 29, 2012	Semi-finals	"Let It Be"	Terry McDermott	70	1	18	check	
January 5, 2013	Finals	"Cry"	Cassadee Pope	60	1	14	check	
Season 4
May 25, 2013	Live Playoffs	"Maybe It Was Memphis"^{[C]}	Danielle Bradbery (Winner)	92	2*	35	x1	
June 8, 2013	Top 10 Perform Live	"Heads Carolina, Tails California"	Danielle Bradbery	91	1	41	check	
June 15, 2013	Top 8 Perform Live	"Grandpa (Tell Me 'Bout the Good Ol' Days)"	Danielle Bradbery	89	1	36		
June 22, 2013	Quarter-finals	"I Knew You Were Trouble"	Michelle Chamuel (Runner-up)	85	1	34	check	
June 29, 2013	Semi-finals	"Danny's Song"^{[D]}	The Swon Brothers (3rd place)	66	2	22	x2	
June 29, 2013	Semi-finals	"Who I Am"	Danielle Bradbery	78	1	30	check	
June 29, 2013	Semi-finals	"Turn The Page"	The Swon Brothers	90	1	41	check	
June 29, 2013	Semi-finals	"Please Remember Me"	Danielle Bradbery	91	1	42	check	
June 29, 2013	Semi-finals	"Sad"	Amber Carrington	92	1	43	check	
July 6, 2013	Finals	"Born to Fly"	Danielle Bradbery	75	1	24	check	
July 6, 2013	Finals	"Why"	Michelle Chamuel	92	1	38	check	
July 6, 2013	Finals	"One"	Michelle Chamuel with coach, Usher	98	1	45	check	
July 6, 2013	Finals	"I Can't Tell You Why"	The Swon Brothers	99	1	48	check	
Season 5
November 23, 2013	Live Playoffs	"A Case of You"	James Wolpert	72	1	18	check	
November 30, 2013	Top 12 Perform Live	"Hallelujah"	Matthew Schuler	40	2	9	check	
December 14, 2013	Top 8 Perform Live	"At Last"	Will Champlin	83	1	25	check	
December 28, 2013	Top 5 Perform Live	"Bridge Over Troubled Water"	Tessanne Chin	64	1	14	check	
Season 6
April 21, 2014	Top 12 Perform Live	"Stay with Me"	Josh Kaufman	92	1	29	check	
April 28, 2014	Top 10 Perform Live	"Hold On, We're Going Home"	Christina Grimmie	74	1	17	check	
May 5, 2014	Top 8 Perform Live	"I Can't Make You Love Me"	Josh Kaufman	71	1	8	check	
May 5, 2014	Top 8 Perform Live	"How to Love"	Christina Grimmie	79	1	22	check	
May 12, 2014	Semi-finals	"Heaven"	Jake Worthington	98	1	31	check	
May 19, 2014	Finals	"Can't Help Falling in Love"	Christina Grimmie	74	1	22	check	
Season 7
November 17, 2014	Top 12 Perform Live	"Take Me to Church"	Matt McAndrew	92	1	31	check	
December 1, 2014	Top 8 Perform Live	"The Blower's Daughter"	Matt McAndrew	40	1	8	check	
December 1, 2014	Top 8 Perform Live	"Royals"	Taylor John Williams	100	1	30	check	
December 8, 2014	Semi-finals	"The Old Rugged Cross"	Craig Wayne Boyd	59	1	13	check	
December 8, 2014	Semi-finals	"Make It Rain"	Matt McAndrew	81	1	22	check	
December 8, 2014	Semi-finals	"When I Was Your Man"	Chris Jamison	98	1	30	check	
December 15, 2014	Finals	"Wasted Love"	Matt McAndrew	14	1	5	check	
December 15, 2014	Finals	"My Baby's Got a Smile on Her Face"	Craig Wayne Boyd	34	1	7	check	
December 15, 2014	Finals	"Velvet"	Chris Jamison	53	1	13	check	
December 15, 2014	Finals	"Lost Without U"	Chris Jamison with coach, Adam Levine	63	1	18	check	
December 15, 2014	Finals	"Soldier"	Damien	74	1	24	check	
December 15, 2014	Finals	"Lost Stars"	Matt McAndrew with coach, Adam Levine	83	1	27	check	
Season 8
May 2, 2015	Top 12	"Imagine"	Sawyer Fredericks	98	1		check	
May 2, 2015	Top 12	"House of the Rising Sun"	Kimberly Nichole	100	1		check	
May 9, 2015	Top 10	"Make It Rain"	Koryn Hawthorne	84	1		check	
May 9, 2015	Top 10	"Iris"	Sawyer Fredericks	100	1		check	
May 16, 2015	Top 8	"Simple Man"	Sawyer Fredericks	71	1		check	
May 23, 2015	Top 6	"Shine On"	Sawyer Fredericks	99	1		check	
May 30, 2015	Semi-finals	"A Thousand Years"	Sawyer Fredericks	94	1		check	
June 6, 2015	Finals	"Please"	Sawyer Fredericks	37	1		check	
June 6, 2015	Finals	"Old Man"	Sawyer Fredericks	63	1		check	
Season 9
November 28, 2015	Live Playoffs	"Halo"	Jordan Smith	88	1	14	check	
December 5, 2015	Top 12	"Great Is Thy Faithfulness"	Jordan Smith	30	1	3	check	
December 19, 2015	Top 10	"Hallelujah"	Jordan Smith	61	1		check	
December 19, 2015	Top 10	"I'd Love to Lay You Down"	Barrett Barber	92	1		check	
December 19, 2015	Top 10	"Girls Just Want to Have Fun"	Madi Davis	98	1		check	
December 26, 2015	Semi-finals	"Somebody To Love"	Jordan Smith	21	2		check	
January 2, 2016	Finals	"Mary Did You Know"	Jordan Smith	24	1		check	
January 2, 2016	Finals	"Burning House"	Emily Ann Roberts	56	1		check	
January 2, 2016	Finals	"Climb Every Mountain"	Jordan Smith	71	1		check	
January 2, 2016	Finals	"God Only Knows"	Jordan Smith with coach, Adam Levine	90	1		check	
"—" denotes a recording that did not chart, and * denotes weeks on charts are due to re-entry.
Season 10
June 4, 2016	Semifinals	"I'm Sorry"	Adam Wakefield	94	1		check	
June 11, 2016	Finals	"Lonesome Broken & Blue"	Adam Wakefield	73	1		check	
June 11, 2016	Finals	"Every Breath You Take"	Hannah Huston	94	1		check	
June 11, 2016	Finals	"Down That Road"	Alisan Porter	100	1	20	check	
Season 11
December 31, 2016	Finals	"Darlin' Don't Go"	Sundance Head	67	1		check	
December 31, 2016	Finals	"At Last"	Sundance Head	89	1		check	
Season 12
June 3, 2017	Semifinals	"Ghost in This House"	Lauren Duski	98	1		check	
June 10, 2017	Finals	"Deja Vu"	Lauren Duski	43	1		check	
June 10, 2017	Finals	"Money on You"	Chris Blue	66	1		check	
June 10, 2017	Finals	"The Dance"	Lauren Duski	92	1		check	
Season 13
December 2, 2017	Top 11	"Total Eclipse of the Heart"	Chloe Kohanski	99	1	6	check	
January 6, 2018	Finals	"Tennessee Rain"	Addison Agen	67	1	3	check	
January 6, 2018	Finals	"Wish I Didn't Love You"	Chloe Kohanski	69	1	5	check	
January 6, 2018	Finals	"I Pray"	Red Marlow	84	1	7	check	

=== Bubbling Under Hot 100 singles ===
Hot 100 singles per season
Season 1	3
Season 2	8
Season 3	9
Season 4	16

The following songs failed to reach the Hot 100, but managed to make the Bubbling Under Hot 100 Singles charts. They are listed separately as the chart has rules that make it easier for new songs to chart, namely that those that have entered the Hot 100 before cannot chart here.

Entry Date	Show Segment	Single	Artist	Peak	Hot Digital Songs Peak	iTunes bonus	Ref
Season 1
July 9, 2011	Semi-finals	"The Thrill Is Gone"	Beverly McClellan	23	—	—N/a	
July 16, 2011	Finals	"Love Is a Battlefield"	Vicci Martinez with coach, Cee Lo Green	2	—	—N/a	
July 16, 2011	Finals	"Lovesick" (original)	Beverly McClellan	11	—	—N/a	
Season 2
March 10, 2012	Blind Auditions	"Folsom Prison Blues"	Jamie Lono (Eliminated in Battle Rounds)	14	—	—N/a	
April 21, 2012	Live Rounds	"Somebody That I Used To Know"	Lindsey Pavao	6	71	—N/a	
May 12, 2012	Quarter-finals	"...Baby One More Time"	Tony Lucca	17	75	—N/a	
May 19, 2012	Semi-finals	"Skinny Love"	Lindsey Pavao	1	44	—N/a	
May 19, 2012	Semi-finals	"Killing Me Softly With His Song"	Katrina Parker (5th–8th Place)	25	—	—N/a	
May 26, 2012	Finals	"Free Bird"	Juliet Simms	1	44	—N/a	
May 26, 2012	Finals	"You Raise Me Up"	Chris Mann	2	46	—N/a	
May 26, 2012	Finals	"Soul Man"	Jermaine Paul with coach, Blake Shelton	8	56	—N/a	
Season 3
November 24, 2012	Live Playoffs	"Dream On"	Amanda Brown	13	53	—N/a	
December 8, 2012	Top 10 Perform Live	"Lean on Me"	Nicholas David	7	59		
December 15, 2012	Top 8 Perform Live	"What's Going On"	Nicholas David	15	52	check	
December 22, 2012	Quarter-finals	"Stand"	Cassadee Pope	3	37	check	
December 22, 2012	Quarter-finals	"I'm with You	Cassadee Pope	11	44	check	
December 22, 2012	Quarter-finals	"And I'm Telling You I'm Not Going"	Trevin Hunte (4th place)	12	48	check	
December 22, 2012	Quarter-finals	"Crazy"	Melanie Martinez	19	55		
December 29, 2012	Semi-finals	"You Are So Beautiful"	Nicholas David	1	38	check	
January 5, 2012	Finals	"Broken Wings"	Terry McDermott	8	57	check	
Season 4
April 13, 2013	Blind Auditions	"One of Us"	Sarah Simmons (7th/8th place)	4	58	—N/a	
April 13, 2013	Blind Auditions	"Sexy and I Know It"	Christian Porter (Eliminated in Battle Rounds)	25	—	—N/a	
May 25, 2013	Live Playoffs	"Stay"	Amber Carrington (4th/5th place)	6	57	—N/a	
May 25, 2013	Live Playoffs	"True Colors"	Michelle Chamuel	15	68	—N/a	
June 1, 2013	Top 12 Perform Live	"Who's Gonna Fill Their Shoes"	The Swon Brothers (3rd place)	14	66		
June 1, 2013	Top 12 Perform Live	"The Man Who Can't Be Moved"	Josiah Hawley (9th/10th place)	18	73		
June 1, 2013	Top 12 Perform Live	"The Story"	Sarah Simmons	19	—		
June 8, 2013	Top 10 Perform Live	"Just Give Me a Reason"	Michelle Chamuel	9	68		
June 8, 2013	Top 10 Perform Live	"How Great Thou Art"	Holly Tucker	22	—		
June 15, 2013	Top 8 Perform Live	"Grenade"	Michelle Chamuel	2	52		
June 15, 2013	Top 8 Perform Live	"Skyfall"	Amber Carrington	22	72		
June 22, 2013	Quarter-finals	"A Little Bit Stronger"	Danielle Bradbery	8	56		
June 22, 2013	Quarter-finals	"Somewhere Only We Know"	Michelle Chamuel	22	70		
June 29, 2013	Semi-finals	"Time After Time"	Michelle Chamuel	6	60		
June 29, 2013	Semi-finals	"Clarity"	Michelle Chamuel	23	—		
July 6, 2013	Finals	"Timber, I'm Falling In Love"	Danielle Bradbery with coach, Blake Shelton	1	49		
Season 5
October 19, 2013	Blind Auditions	"Electric Feel"	Preston Pohl	21	52	—N/a	
November 16, 2013	Knockouts	"Let Her Go"	Cole Vosbury (4th place)	2	38	—N/a	
November 23, 2013	Live Playoffs	"We're Going to Be Friends"	Caroline Pennell	3	37		
November 23, 2013	Live Playoffs	"I Put A Spell On You"	Jacquie Lee	16	54		
November 23, 2013	Live Playoffs	"Wrecking Ball"	Matthew Schuler	25	64		
December 7, 2013	Top 10 Perform Live	"To Be with You"	Cole Vosbury	20	—		
December 14, 2013	Top 8 Perform Live	"I Still Believe in You"	Cole Vosbury	22	47		
Season 6
May 12, 2014	Semi-finals	"All of Me"	Josh Kaufman	3	34	check	
May 12, 2014	Semi-finals	"Love Runs Out"	Josh Kaufman	23	—		
May 12, 2014	Semi-finals	"Foolish Games"	Kristen Merlin	11	44	check	
Season 9
December 26, 2015	Semi-finals	"Believe"	Jeffrey Austin	3	10	check	
December 26, 2015	Semi-finals	"To Make You Feel My Love"	Madi Davis	13	16	check	
December 26, 2015	Semi-finals	"Big Girls Don't Cry"	Madi Davis	14	15	check	
December 26, 2015	Semi-finals	"9 To 5"	Emily Ann Roberts	19	19	check	
"—" denotes a recording that did not chart.

=== Other notable singles ===
==== Hot Digital Songs ====
The following singles failed to chart on the overall charts, likely because of lack of airplay and online streaming, but still reached high sales figures, comparable to other singles from The Voice that did chart.

Entry Date	Show Segment	Single	Artist	Hot Digital Songs Peak	Ref
Season 3
December 15, 2012	Top 8 Perform Live	"Someone Like You"	Amanda Brown	72	
December 22, 2012	Quarter-finals	"The Show"	Melanie Martinez	67	
Season 9
December 5, 2015	Top 12	"Hotline Bling"	Amy Vachal	28	
December 5, 2015	Top 12	"Let It Go"	Jeffery Austin	48	
December 26, 2015	Semi-finals	"Amazing Grace"	Braiden Sunshine	25	
December 26, 2015	Semi-finals	"The Climb"	Zach Seabaugh	36	
December 26, 2015	Semi-finals	"Ghost"	Barrett Baber	40	
Season 13
December 16, 2017	Top 11	"A Case of You"	Addison Agen	13	
December 16, 2017	Top 11	"The Dance"	Red Marlow	13	
December 23, 2017	Top 10	"Amazing Grace"	Brooke Simpson	9	
December 23, 2017	Top 10	"Call Me"	Chloe Kohanski	22	
December 23, 2017	Top 10	"Lucky"	Addison Agen	25	
December 30, 2017	Semi-finals	"I Want to Know What Love Is"	Chloe Kohanski	6	
December 30, 2017	Semi-finals	"Both Sides, Now"	Addison Agen	8	
December 30, 2017	Semi-finals	"Wicked Game"	Chloe Kohanski & Noah Mac	9	
December 30, 2017	Semi-finals	"Go Rest High on That Mountain"	Chloe Kohanski	26	
December 30, 2017	Semi-finals	"Faithfully"	Brooke Simpson	30	
December 30, 2017	Semi-finals	"River"	Noah Mac	39	
January 3, 2018	Finals	"O Holy Night"	Brooke Simpson	10	
January 3, 2018	Finals	"Humble and Kind"	Addison Agen	11	
January 3, 2018	Finals	"Bette Davis Eyes"	Chloe Kohanski	13	
January 3, 2018	Finals	"What Is Beautiful"	Brooke Simpson	15	
January 3, 2018	Finals	"To Make You Feel My Love"	Red Marlow	18	
January 3, 2018	Finals	"Falling Slowly"	Addison Agen & Adam Levine	22	
January 3, 2018	Finals	"You Got It"	Chloe Kohanski & Blake Shelton	45	

==== By genre ====
===== Christian =====
Season	Entry date	Show segment	Song title	Artist	Position in show	Peak	Weeks on chart	Ref(s)
3	December 19, 2015	Top 8	"Hallelujah"	Jordan Smith	Winner	1	2
3	December 26, 2015	Semi-finals	"Amazing Grace"	Braiden Sunshine	5th–9th place	1	1

===== Country =====
Season	Entry date	Show segment	Song title	Artist	Position in show	Peak	Weeks on chart	Ref(s)
3	December 8, 2012	Top 10 Perform Live	"Over You"	Cassadee Pope	Winner	3	6
3	December 29, 2012	Semi-finals	"Stupid Boy"	Cassadee Pope	Winner	4	3
3	5 January 2013	Finals	"Steve McQueen"	Cassadee Pope (with Blake Shelton)	Winner	42	1
3	5 January 2013	Finals	"Dude (Looks Like a Lady)"	Terry McDermott (with Blake Shelton)	Runner-up	43	1
4	April 20, 2013	Blind Auditions	"Safe & Sound"	Savannah Berry	Knockouts	45	1
4	25 May 2013	Live Playoffs	"Maybe It Was Memphis"	Danielle Bradbery	Winner	25	2
4	25 May 2013	Live Playoffs	"Fishin' in the Dark"	The Swon Brothers	3rd place	44	1
4	1 June 2013	Top 12 Perform Live	"Who's Gonna Fill Their Shoes"	The Swon Brothers	3rd place	32	1
4	1 June 2013	Top 12 Perform Live	"Wasted"	Danielle Bradbery	Winner	35	1
4	1 June 2013	Top 12 Perform Live	"I'm Gonna Love You Through It"	Amber Carrington	4th/5th place	48	1
4	8 June 2013	Top 10 Perform Live	"Heads Carolina, Tails California"	Danielle Bradbery	Winner	23	1
4	8 June 2013	Top 10 Perform Live	"How Great Thou Art"	Holly Tucker	6th place	35	1
4	8 June 2013	Top 10 Perform Live	"How Country Feels"	The Swon Brothers	3rd place	45	1
4	15 June 2013	Top 8 Perform Live	"Grandpa (Tell Me 'Bout the Good Ol' Days)"	Danielle Bradbery	Winner	24	1
4	15 June 2013	Top 8 Perform Live	"Seven Bridges Road"	The Swon Brothers	3rd place	36	1
4	15 June 2013	Top 8 Perform Live	"DONE."	Holly Tucker	6th place	46	1
4	22 June 2013	Quarter-finals	"A Little Bit Stronger"	Danielle Bradbery	Winner	31	1
4	22 June 2013	Quarter-finals	"Shake the Sugar Tree"	Danielle Bradbery	Winner	38	1
4	22 June 2013	Quarter-finals	"Wagon Wheel"	The Swon Brothers	3rd place	36	1
4	22 June 2013	Quarter-finals	"I Remember You"	Amber Carrington	4th/5th place	43	1
4	22 June 2013	Quarter-finals	"Crazy"	Amber Carrington	4th/5th place	44	1
4	22 June 2013	Quarter-finals	"Okie From Muskogee"	The Swon Brothers	3rd place	49	1
4	29 June 2013	Semi-finals	"Danny's Song"	The Swon Brothers	3rd place	16	1
4	29 June 2013	Semi-finals	"Who I Am"	Danielle Bradbery	Winner	22	1
4	29 June 2013	Semi-finals	"Turn The Page"	The Swon Brothers	3rd place	29	1
4	29 June 2013	Semi-finals	"Please Remember Me"	Danielle Bradbery	Winner	30	1
4	6 July 2013	Finals	"Born to Fly"	Danielle Bradbery	Winner	20	1
4	6 July 2013	Finals	"I Can't Tell You Why"	The Swon Brothers	3rd place	29	1
4	6 July 2013	Finals	"Timber, I'm Falling In Love"	Danielle Bradbery (with Blake Shelton)	Winner	30	1
4	6 July 2013	Finals	"Celebrity"	The Swon Brothers (with Blake Shelton)	3rd place	47	1
5	December 14, 2013	Top 8 Perform Live	"I Still Believe in You"	Cole Vosbury	4th/5th place	30	1
5	December 28, 2013	Semi-finals	"Shameless"	Cole Vosbury	4th/5th place	29	1
6	March 31, 2014	The Battles, Round 2	"Have a Little Faith in Me"	Jake Worthington	2nd place	49	1
6	21 April 2014	Top 12 Perform Live	"Anymore"	Jake Worthington	2nd place	42	1
6	21 April 2014	Top 12 Perform Live	"Stay"	Kristen Merlin	4th/5th place	38	1
6	28 April 2014	Top 10 Perform Live	"You Lie"	Audra McLaughlin	6th/7th/8th place	37	1
6	28 April 2014	Top 10 Perform Live	"Run"	Jake Worthington	2nd place	45	1
6	28 April 2014	Top 10 Perform Live	"Let Her Go"	Kristen Merlin	4th/5th place	35	1
6	5 May 2014	Top 8 Perform Live	"Hillbilly Deluxe"	Jake Worthington	2nd place	36	1
6	5 May 2014	Top 8 Perform Live	"I Drive Your Truck"	Kristen Merlin	4th/5th place	40	1
6	May 12, 2014	Semi-finals	"Good Ol' Boys"	Jake Worthington	2nd place	33	1
6	May 12, 2014	Semi-finals	"Heaven"	Jake Worthington	2nd place	23	1
6	May 12, 2014	Semi-finals	"Gunpowder & Lead"	Kristen Merlin	4th/5th place	47	1
9	December 26, 2015	Semi-finals	"9 To 5"	Emily Ann Roberts	2nd place	25	1
9	December 26, 2015	Semi-finals	"The Climb"	Zach Seabaugh	?	30	1
9	December 26, 2015	Semi-finals	"Ghost"	Barrett Baber	?	32	1

===== Latin =====
Season	Entry date	Show segment	Song title	Artist	Position in show	Peak	Weeks on chart	Ref(s)
3	November 24, 2012	Live Playoffs	"El Rey"	Julio Cesar Castillo	Live Playoffs	49	1
4	April 20, 2013	Blind Auditions	"Loca"	Monique Abbadie	Knockouts	49	1

===== R&B / hip hop =====
Season	Entry date	Show segment	Song title	Artist	Position in show	Peak	Weeks on chart	Ref(s)
3	November 24, 2012	Live Playoffs	"How Am I Supposed to Live Without You"	Trevin Hunte	4th place	57	1
3	15 December 2012	Top 8 Perform Live	"What's Going On"	Nicholas David	3rd place	35	1
3	15 December 2012	Top 8 Perform Live	"The Greatest Love of All"	Trevin Hunte	4th place	56	1
3	December 22, 2012	Quarter-finals	"And I Am Telling You I'm Not Going"	Trevin Hunte	4th place	37	1
4	May 25, 2013	Live Playoffs	"Oh! Darling"	Sasha Allen	4th/5th place	54	1
4	June 1, 2013	Top 12 Perform Live	"You've Got a Friend"	Judith Hill	7th/8th place	56	1
4	June 15, 2013	Top 8 Perform Live	"#thatPower"	Judith Hill	7th/8th place	57	1
4	June 22, 2013	Quarter-finals	"Ain't No Way"	Sasha Allen	4th/5th place	55	1

===== Rock =====
Season	Entry date	Show segment	Song title	Artist	Position in show	Peak	Weeks on chart	Ref(s)
3	8 December 2012	Top 10 Perform Live	"Seven Nation Army"	Melanie Martinez	5th/6th place	10	2
3	8 December 2012	Top 10 Perform Live	"Stars"	Amanda Brown	5th/6th place	11	1
3	December 15, 2012	Quarter-finals	"Too Close"	Melanie Martinez	5th/6th place	11	1
3	December 22, 2012	Quarter-finals	"Stay With Me"	Terry McDermott	Runner-up	38	1
3	December 29, 2012	Semi-finals	"Let It Be"	Terry McDermott	Runner-up	11	1
4	April 13, 2013	Blind Auditions	"One of Us"	Sarah Simmons	7th/8th place	19	2
4	May 18, 2013	Knockouts	"Wild Horses"	Sarah Simmons	7th/8th place	26	1
4	May 25, 2013	Live Playoffs	"The A Team"	Caroline Glaser	Live Playoffs	20	1
4	1 June 2013	Top 12 Perform Live	"The Man Who Can't Be Moved"	Josiah Hawley	9th/10th place	16	1
4	1 June 2013	Top 12 Perform Live	"The Story"	Sarah Simmons	7th/8th place	17	1
4	June 15, 2013	Top 8 Perform Live	"Somebody That I Used to Know"	Sarah Simmons	7th/8th place	23	1
4	June 22, 2013	Quarter-finals	"Somewhere Only We Know"	Michelle Chamuel	Runner-up	15	1
5	October 12, 2013	Blind Auditions	"The Scientist"	Holly Henry	Knockout Rounds	21	1
5	October 19, 2013	Blind Auditions	"Electric Feel"	Preston Pohl	Live Playoffs	19	2
5	November 16, 2013	Knockout Rounds	"Let Her Go"	Cole Vosbury	4th/5th place	15	2
5	23 November 2013	Live Playoffs	"A Case of You"	James Wolpert	4th/5th place	10	1
5	23 November 2013	Live Playoffs	"We're Going to Be Friends"	Caroline Pennell	7th/8th place	16	1
5	23 November 2013	Live Playoffs	"She Talks To Angels"	Austin Jenckes	9th/10th place	36	1
5	23 November 2013	Live Playoffs	"Home"	Ray Boudreaux	7th/8th place	41	1
5	23 November 2013	Live Playoffs	"Maggie May"	Cole Vosbury	4th/5th place	42	1
5	30 November 2013	Top 12 Perform Live	"Hallelujah"	Matthew Schuler	6th place	9	4
5	7 December 2013	Top 10 Perform Live	"To Be with You"	Cole Vosbury	4th/5th place	19	1
5	14 December 2013	Top 8 Perform Live	"Somebody to Love"	James Wolpert	4th/5th place	19	1
6	April 28, 2014	Top 10 Perform Live	"Landslide"	Kat Perkins	4th/5th place	35	1
13	December 30, 2017	Semi-finals	"River"	Noah Mac	5th/6th place	16	1

== Post-The Voice releases ==
Only singles that charted on either the Billboard Hot 100 or Bubbling Under Hot 100 charts, and albums that charted on the Billboard 200 chart are included in the following lists.

=== Singles ===
Artist	Season	Position in show	Song title	Release date	US Peak	RIAA Certification
RaeLynn	2	9th–12th	"Boyfriend"	December 11, 2012	—^{[E]}	
RaeLynn	2	9th–12th	"God Made Girls"	June 30, 2014	61	Platinum
RaeLynn	2	9th–12th	"For a Boy"	March 23, 2015	—^{[M]}	
Gwen Sebastian	2	Battle Rounds	"My Eyes" (with Blake Shelton)	April 14, 2014	39	Gold
Cassadee Pope	3	Winner	"Wasting All These Tears"	June 4, 2013	37	Platinum
Cassadee Pope	3	Winner	"Think of You" (with Chris Young)	January 25, 2016	40	Platinum
Melanie Martinez	3	5th–6th	"Dollhouse"	February 9, 2014	—N/a	2xPlatinum
Melanie Martinez	3	5th–6th	"Carousel"	May 19, 2014	—^{[J]}	Platinum
Melanie Martinez	3	5th–6th	"Pity Party"	June 1, 2015	—^{[K]}	2xPlatinum
Melanie Martinez	3	5th–6th	"Soap"	July 15, 2015	—N/a	Platinum
Melanie Martinez	3	5th–6th	"Sippy Cup"	July 29, 2015	—N/a	Gold
Melanie Martinez	3	5th–6th	"Cry Baby"	August 14, 2015	–	Gold
Melanie Martinez	3	5th–6th	"Alphabet Boy"	August 14, 2015	124	Gold
Melanie Martinez	3	5th–6th	"Pacify Her"	August 14, 2015	115	Platinum
Melanie Martinez	3	5th–6th	"Mrs. Potato Head"	August 14, 2015	108	Gold
Melanie Martinez	3	5th–6th	"Mad Matter"	August 14, 2015	–	Platinum
Melanie Martinez	3	5th–6th	"Tag, Your It"	August 14, 2015	–	Gold
Melanie Martinez	3	5th–6th	"Milk & Cookies"	August 14, 2015	–	Gold
Melanie Martinez	3	5th–6th	"Training Wheels"	August 14, 2015	–	Platinum
Melanie Martinez	3	5th–6th	"Cake"	August 14, 2015	–	Gold
Melanie Martinez	3	5th–6th	"Play Date"	August 14, 2015	–	2xPlatinum
Melanie Martinez	3	5th–6th	"Show & Tell"	September 6, 2019	—^{[L]}	
Melanie Martinez	3	5th–6th	"Teacher's Pet"	September 6, 2019	–	Gold
Melanie Martinez	3	5th–6th	"Death"	March 17, 2023	95	—N/a
Melanie Martinez	3	5th–6th	"Void"	March 29, 2023	71	—N/a
Melanie Martinez	3	5th–6th	"Evil"	November 17, 2023	105	—N/a
Loren Allred	3	Live Playoffs	"Never Enough"	December 8, 2017	88	Platinum
Danielle Bradbery	4	Winner	"The Heart of Dixie"	July 16, 2013	58	
Danielle Bradbery	4	Winner	"Sway"	June 2, 2017	–	Gold
Danielle Bradbery	4	Winner	"Worth It"	March 5, 2018	–	Gold
The Swon Brothers	4	3rd	"Later On"	December 10, 2013	86	
Morgan Wallen	6	Live Playoffs	"The Way I Talk –	3xPlatinum	–	3xPlatinum
Morgan Wallen	6	Live Playoffs	"Up Down" (with Florida Georgia Line)	November 27, 2017	49	3xPlatinum
Morgan Wallen	6	Live Playoffs	"Whiskey Glasses"	July 30, 2018	17	9xPlatinum
Morgan Wallen	6	Live Playoffs	"Chasin' You"	July 29, 2019	16	6xPlatinum
Morgan Wallen	6	Live Playoffs	"Heartless" (with Diplo)	August 16, 2019	39	6xPlatinum
Morgan Wallen	6	Live Playoffs	"This Bar"	December 31, 2019	92	3xPlatinum
Morgan Wallen	6	Live Playoffs	"More Than My Hometown"	May 27, 2020	15	6xPlatinum
Morgan Wallen	6	Live Playoffs	"Cover Me Up"	April 5, 2019	52	4xPlatinum
Morgan Wallen	6	Live Playoffs	"7 Summers"	August 14, 2020	6	4xPlatinum
Morgan Wallen	6	Live Playoffs	"Wasted on You"	January 11, 2021	9	8xPlatinum
Morgan Wallen	6	Live Playoffs	"Sand in My Boots"	August 23, 2021	32	2xPlatinum
Morgan Wallen	6	Live Playoffs	"Broadway Girls"	December 17, 2021	14	2xPlatinum
Morgan Wallen	6	Live Playoffs	"Flower Shops"	December 31, 2021	64	2xPlatinum
Morgan Wallen	6	Live Playoffs	"Don't Think Jesus"	April 15, 2022	7	Platinum
Morgan Wallen	6	Live Playoffs	"You Proof"	July 18, 2022	5	Gold
Morgan Wallen	6	Live Playoffs	"Thought You Should Know	November 7, 2022	12	4xPlatinum
Morgan Wallen	6	Live Playoffs	"Last Night"	February 6, 2023	1	7xPlatinum
Morgan Wallen	6	Live Playoffs	"One Thing at a Time"	March 13, 2023	10	—N/a
Morgan Wallen	6	Live Playoffs	"Everything I Love"	June 26, 2023	14	Platinum
Morgan Wallen	6	Live Playoffs	"Thinkin' Bout Me"	September 7, 2023	7	3xPlatinum
Morgan Wallen	6	Live Playoffs	"Man Made a Bar"	November 13, 2023	15	Platinum
Morgan Wallen	6	Live Playoffs	"Cowgirls"	April 15, 2024	19	Platinum
Morgan Wallen	6	Live Playoffs	"I Had Some Help" (with Post Malone)	May 10, 2024	1	—N/a
Morgan Wallen	6	Live Playoffs	"Lies Lies Lies"	December 5, 2023	7	—N/a
Morgan Wallen	6	Live Playoffs	"Love Somebody"	October 18, 2024	1	—N/a
Morgan Wallen	6	Live Playoffs	"Smile"	December 31, 2024	4	—N/a
Morgan Wallen	6	Live Playoffs	"I'm the Problem"	January 31, 2025	2	—N/a
Fousheé	15	Battle Rounds	"Deep End Freestyle" (with Sleepy Hallow)	April 3, 2020	80	—N/a
Libianca	21	Live Playoffs	"People"	December 6, 2022	103	—N/a

=== Albums ===
Artist	Season	Position in show	Album title	Release date	US Peak	Ref(s)
Javier Colon	1	Winner	Come Through For You	November 21, 2011	134	
Dia Frampton	1	Runner-up	Red	December 6, 2011	106	
Vicci Martinez	1	3rd-4th place	Come Along	May 1, 2012	180	
Vicci Martinez	1	3rd-4th place	Vicci	June 19, 2012	—^{[F]}	
Xenia	1	5th-8th place	Sing You Home	December 20, 2011	—^{[G]}	
Chris Mann	2	4th place	Roads	October 30, 2012	172	
RaeLynn	2	9th-12th place	Me	January 13, 2015	49	
Cassadee Pope	3	Winner	The Complete Season 3 Collection (The Voice Performance)	December 18, 2012	125	
Cassadee Pope	3	Winner	Frame by Frame	October 8, 2013	9	
Melanie Martinez	3	5th-6th place	Cry Baby	August 14, 2015	6	
Melanie Martinez	3	5th-6th place	K-12	September 6, 2019	3	
Danielle Bradbery	4	Winner	The Complete Season 4 Collection (The Voice Performance)	June 19, 2013	19	
Danielle Bradbery	4	Winner	Danielle Bradbery	November 25, 2013	19	
Danielle Bradbery	4	Winner	I Don't Believe We've Met	December 1, 2017	41	
Michelle Chamuel	4	Runner-up	The Complete Season 4 Collection (The Voice Performance)	June 19, 2013	57	
The Swon Brothers	4	3rd place	The Complete Season 4 Collection (The Voice Performance)	June 19, 2013	65	
The Swon Brothers	4	3rd place	The Swon Brothers	October 14, 2014	28	
Tessanne Chin	5	Winner	The Complete Season 5 Collection (The Voice Performance)	December 17, 2013	—^{[H]}	
Tessanne Chin	5	Winner	Count On My Love	July 1, 2014	41	
Josh Kaufman	6	Winner	The Complete Season 6 Collection (The Voice Performance)	May 20, 2014	92	
Craig Wayne Boyd	7	Winner	The Complete Season 7 Collection (The Voice Performance)	December 16, 2014	41	
Matt McAndrew	7	Runner-up	The Complete Season 7 Collection (The Voice Performance)	December 16, 2014	26	
Chris Jamison	7	3rd place	The Complete Season 7 Collection (The Voice Performance)	December 16, 2014	48	
Damien Lawson	7	4th place	The Complete Season 7 Collection (The Voice Performance)	December 16, 2014	136	
Sawyer Fredericks	8	Winner	The Complete Season 8 Collection (The Voice Performance)	May 19, 2015	6	
Sawyer Fredericks	8	Winner	A Good Storm	May 13, 2016	48	
Meghan Linsey	8	Runner-up	The Complete Season 8 Collection (The Voice Performance)	May 19, 2015	45	
Koryn Hawthorne	8	4th place	The Complete Season 8 Collection (The Voice Performance)	May 19, 2015	85	
Jordan Smith	9	Winner	The Complete Season 9 Collection (The Voice Performance)	December 15, 2015	11	
Jordan Smith	9	Winner	Something Beautiful	March 18, 2016	2	
Jordan Smith	9	Winner	'Tis The Season	October 28, 2016	11	
Emily Ann Roberts	9	Runner-up	The Complete Season 9 Collection (The Voice Performance)	December 15, 2015	43	
Barrett Baber	9	Third place	The Complete Season 9 Collection (The Voice Performance)	December 15, 2015	137	
Jeffery Austin	9	Fourth place	The Complete Season 9 Collection (The Voice Performance)	December 15, 2015	106	
Alisan Porter	10	Winner	The Complete Season 10 Collection (The Voice Performance)	May 24, 2016	27	
Sundance Head	11	Winner	The Complete Season 11 Collection (The Voice Performance)	December 13, 2016	30	
Billy Gilman	11	Runner-up	The Complete Season 11 Collection (The Voice Performance)	December 13, 2016	77	

== Notes ==
- A Xenia's cover of "Price Tag" entered the Bubbling Under Hot 100 chart at No. 16, but broke into the Billboard Hot 100 at No. 99 in the following week.
- B Cassadee Pope's cover of "Over You" re-entered the Hot 100 at No. 84 when it reprised with the finale songs, and received a second iTunes bonus for that period.
- C Danielle Bradbery's cover of "Maybe It Was Memphis" re-entered the Hot 100 at No. 93 when it reprised with the finale songs, and received an iTunes bonus for that period. (Original period performed at was not applicable for the iTunes bonus.)
- D The Swon Brothers' cover of "Danny's Song" re-entered the Hot 100 at No. 78 when it reprised with the finale songs, and received a second iTunes bonus for that period.
- E "Boyfriend" did not enter the Billboard Hot 100, but peaked at No. 18 on the Bubbling Under Hot 100 Singles chart.
- F Vicci did not enter the Billboard 200, but peaked at No. 10 on the Heatseekers Albums chart.
- G Sing You Home did not enter the Billboard 200, but peaked at No. 5 on the Heatseekers Album chart.
- H The Complete Season 5 Collection (The Voice Performance) did not enter the Billboard 200, but peaked at No. 4 on the Heatseekers Album chart.
- J "Carousel" did not enter the Hot 100, but peaked on the Bubbling Under Hot 100 chart at No. 19.
- K "Pity Party" did not enter the Hot 100, but peaked on the Bubbling Under Hot 100 chart at No. 18.
- L "Show & Tell" did not enter the Hot 100, but peaked on the Bubbling Under Hot 100 chart at No. 14.
- M "For a Boy" did not enter the Hot 100, but peaked at number 15 on Bubbling Under Hot 100 Singles, which acts as a 25-song extension of the Hot 100.
