= Hello Summer =

Hello Summer may refer to:

- Hello Summer, from BoA videography
- "Hello Summer", song by Rameez
- "Hello Summer", song by Danielle Bradbery from I Don't Believe We've Met
