= Pray for You =

Pray for You may refer to:

- "Pray for You" (Jaron and the Long Road to Love song)
- "Pray for You" (The Swon Brothers song)
- "Pray for You", by Sara Evans from Greatest Hits
