= Young in America =

Single by Danielle Bradbery

from the album Danielle Bradbery
- Released: April 21, 2014
- Recorded: 2013
- Genre: Country
- Length: 3:43
- Label: Big Machine; Republic Nashville
- Songwriters: Whitney Duncan; Jaren Johnston; Kylie Sackley
- Producer: Dann Huff

Danielle Bradbery singles chronology
"The Heart of Dixie" (2013)	"Young in America" (2014)	"Friend Zone" (2015)

"Young in America" is a song recorded by American country music artist Danielle Bradbery and written by Whitney Duncan, Jaren Johnston, and Kylie Sackley. It was released as the second single from her self-titled debut album on April 21, 2014.

== Critical reception ==
Vickye Fisher of the country blog For The Country Record gave the song a favorable review, stating "they pick up on a cheesy patriotic theme with plenty of inter-rhymes and making sure to name-check various cities, at the same time mentioning fun, “young” things to do, making this a pleasant track that is bound to attract teens" Also, Fisher says "‘Young In America’ also keeps the strong Dixie Chicks-esque fiddle line that was present in ‘The Heart of Dixie’, plus mandolin and acoustic guitar to keep things sweet, and a strong but broad drum line to encourage dancing." Similarly, Jen Swirsky of Country Music Chat states "With Danielle’s broad vocal range, heavy strings and percussion behind her, and an uplifting, positive beat, “Young In America” is the perfect joyride Spring/Summer song for the young at heart."

== Music video ==
Filmed by Shane Drake, the "Young in America" music video was released on May 16, 2014. The video opens with Bradbery walking through a field, to be picked up by friends on the other side. Throughout the video, you see Bradbery and friends doing many activities such as playing with cards, lighting fireworks, and running through the woods.

== Charts ==
The song peaked at number 49 on the Country Airplay chart but a fan favorite.

Chart (2014)	Peak position
US Country Airplay (Billboard)	49
