= Friend Zone (song) =

Single by Danielle Bradbery
- Released: August 28, 2015
- Recorded: 2015
- Genre: Country pop, Country rap
- Length: 2:58
- Label: Big Machine; Republic Nashville
- Songwriter(s): Mikal Blue; Danielle Bradbery; Johan Lindbrandt; Shari Short
- Producer(s): Dann Huff

Danielle Bradbery singles chronology
| "Young in America" (2014) | "Friend Zone" (2015) | "Sway" (2017) |

"Friend Zone" is a song co-written and recorded by American country music artist Danielle Bradbery and written by Mikal Blue, Johan Lindbrandt and Shari Short. It was digitally released on August 28, 2015, though the song never saw an official release to country radio.

== Critical reception ==
"Friend Zone" was panned by critics. Giving it an "F", Jonathan Keefe of Country Universe was heavily critical of the production and lyrics, which he panned for repeating words, improper syllable emphasis, and lines "that can’t even be bothered to keep their overworked, clichéd sports metaphors straight for the duration of a single verse." He also thought that Bradbery and similar artists were attempting "to define themselves in terms of men." He also wrote that "Simply as a piece of music, 'Friend Zone' does literally nothing competently, let alone doing anything well enough to justify its release by an artist of even Bradbery’s marginal name recognition." Jim Casey of Nash Country Weekly rated the song "D−", saying that it was "full of laughably trite sports metaphors and masquerading as a country song via looped banjo." He also criticized the rhyme scheme and repetition of words in the song and said that it "makes a mockery of female empowerment, suggesting women need to be lavished with money to make them feel special".

== Charts ==
| Chart (2015) | Peak position |
|---|---|
| US Hot Country Songs (Billboard) | 41 |
