= Mari Hamada Live Tour 2016 "Mission" =

Video by Mari Hamada
- Released: February 22, 2017
- Recorded: July 18, 2016
- Venue: Tokyo International Forum Hall A
- Genre: J-pop; heavy metal; pop rock
- Language: Japanese
- Label: Meldac/Tokuma Japan
- Producer: Mari Hamada

Mari Hamada chronology
30th Anniversary Mari Hamada Live Tour -Special- (2015)	Mari Hamada Live Tour 2016 "Mission" (2017)	Mari Hamada 35th Anniversary Live "Gracia" at Budokan (2019)

Music video
- Mari Hamada Live Tour 2016 "Mission" DVD & BD digest on YouTube

Mari Hamada Live Tour 2016 "Mission" is a live video by Japanese singer/songwriter Mari Hamada, released on February 22, 2017 by Meldac/Tokuma Japan. Recorded live on July 18, 2016 at the Tokyo International Forum Hall A as the final show of Hamada's Mission tour, the video was released on Blu-ray and DVD. To promote the video, Hamada and guitarist Nozomu Wakai hosted a one-night premium screening at the Shinjuku Piccadilly on March 2.

The video peaked at No. 25 on Oricon's Blu-ray Disc chart and at No. 14 on Oricon's DVD chart.

== Track listing ==
All lyrics are written by Mari Hamada, except where indicated.

Blu-ray
No.	Title	Lyrics	Music	Length
1.	"Introduction SE ~ Sparks"		Hamada; Nozomu Wakai
2.	"Monster Wave"		Hamada
3.	"Crimson"		Hamada; Wakai
4.	"In Your Hands"		Hamada
5.	"Revolution in Reverse"		Hamada
6.	"Night Steals"		Howard Killy
7.	"Anti-Heroine"		Ichiro Hada
8.	"Beautiful Misunderstanding"		Aqui Eguchi; Hamada
9.	"Missing You"		Yūsuke Nakamura
10.	"Antique"		Hamada; Takashi Masuzaki
11.	"Orion"		Takanobu Masuda
12.	"Tears of Asyura"		Hamada
13.	"Carpe Diem"		Hamada; Masaru Kishii
14.	"Superior"		Kishii
15.	"Dystopia"		Kishii
16.	"Crisis Code"		Hamada
17.	"Tokio Makin' Love"	Munetaka Higuchi Project Team	Munetaka Higuchi Project Team
18.	"Rainbow After a Storm"		Hamada; Wakai
19.	"Rin"		Hamada; Wakai
20.	"Historia" (Encore 1)		Kishii
21.	"Somebody's Calling" (Encore 1)		Masuda
22.	"Blue Revolution" (Encore 2)		Matsuzawa; Yōgo Kōno
23.	"Heartbeat Away from You" (Encore 2)		Masuda
24.	"Heartbeat Away from You" (Encore 2)		Masuda
25.	"Outro SE: Orion" (Encore 2)		Hamada

- Tracks 20–25 released as "Disc 2" on DVD version.

== Personnel ==
- Takashi Masuzaki (Dimension) – guitar
- Nozomu Wakai – guitar
- Yōichi Fujii – guitar
- Tomonori "You" Yamada – bass
- Satoshi "Joe" Miyawaki – drums
- Takanobu Masuda – keyboards
- Masafumi Nakao – keyboards, sound effects
- ERI (Eri Hamada) – backing vocals

== Charts ==
Chart (2017)	Peak position
Blu-ray Disc Chart (Oricon)	25
DVD Chart (Oricon)	14
