= Sway (Danielle Bradbery song) =

Single by Danielle Bradbery

from the album I Don't Believe We've Met
- Released: June 2, 2017
- Recorded: 2017
- Genre: Country pop
- Length: 3:31 (album version); 2:40 (radio edit)
- Label: Big Machine
- Songwriters: Danielle Bradbery; Johan Fansson; Emily Weisband
- Producer: Josh Kerr

Danielle Bradbery singles chronology
"Friend Zone" (2015)	"Sway" (2017)	"Worth It" (2018)

"Sway" is a song co-written and recorded by American country music artist Danielle Bradbery. Bradbery wrote the song with Johan Fansson and Emily Weisband. It is the lead single off of her sophomore album, I Don't Believe We've Met. It was released to digital retailers and streaming platforms on June 2, 2017. The song was officially serviced to country radio on August 28, 2017.

== Critical reception ==
Critics have responded positively to Bradbery's new direction. Billy Dukes of Taste of Country said, "Treat her like a new artist — one with a groovy, soulful, passionate debut single that fits on the radio like the cool new kid in high school. Vocally she climbs the ladder, but never shows off." Markos Papadatos of Digital Journal said, "This song showcases her growth and maturity as a contemporary singer-songwriter, and it was worth the long wait." Nashville Noise described the track as "a feel-good song that’s perfect for summer."

The radio edit the song cuts from the end of the second verse to the beginning of the last chorus.

== Music video ==
The official music video was directed by Shaun Silva, and premiered on CMT on October 13, 2017. It starts with Bradbery hanging on a street bench and sweeping in a barbershop having a normal day until a boombox-equipped friend brings “Sway” to her, taking the singer through several locations dancing to the tune. It was filmed at Nashville's West End Middle School and within the Gorge District in Nashville.

== Charts ==
Chart (2017)	Peak position
US Country Airplay (Billboard)	47
US Hot Country Songs (Billboard)	39

== Certifications ==
Region	Certification	Certified units/sales
Canada (Music Canada)	Gold	40,000^{‡}
United States (RIAA)	Gold	500,000^{‡}
^{‡} Sales+streaming figures based on certification alone.
