= Later On (The Swon Brothers song) =

Single by The Swon Brothers

from the album The Swon Brothers
- Released: December 10, 2013
- Genre: Country
- Length: 3:36
- Label: Arista Nashville
- Songwriter(s): Ryan Hurd; Joey Hyde; Justin Wilson
- Producer(s): Mark Bright

The Swon Brothers singles chronology
"Later On" (2013)	"Pray for You" (2014)

"Later On" is a song recorded by American country music duo The Swon Brothers. The song was written by Nashville songwriters Ryan Hurd, Joey Hyde, and Justin Wilson, while production was handled by Mark Bright. It was released to digital retailers December 10, 2013, as the duo's first official single since signing to Arista Nashville, as well as the lead single from their self-titled debut studio album. It was released to country radio on March 3, 2014.

== Critical reception ==
Taste of Country gave the song a positive review, describing it as a "burst of fresh air" in which the brothers deliver a fairly average vocal but prove themselves "capable storytellers" and "full of energy".

== Music video ==
The music video was directed by Roman White and premiered in June 2014.

== Chart performance ==
The song has sold 205,000 copies in the US as of October 2014.

Chart (2013–2014)	Peak position
Canada (Canadian Hot 100)	87
Canada Country (Billboard)	47
US Billboard Hot 100	86
US Country Airplay (Billboard)	13
US Hot Country Songs (Billboard)	21

=== Year-end charts ===
Chart (2014)	Position
US Country Airplay (Billboard)	42
US Hot Country Songs (Billboard)	62
