= I Don't Believe We've Met =

Studio album by Danielle Bradbery
- Released: December 1, 2017
- Recorded: 2017
- Genre: Country pop
- Length: 33:37
- Label: Big Machine
- Producer: Josh Kerr; Afterhrs; Alysa Vanderheym; Jason Gantt; Julian Bunetta; Sam Ellis

Danielle Bradbery chronology
| Danielle Bradbery (2013) | I Don't Believe We've Met (2017) | In Between: The Collection (2022) |

Singles from I Don't Believe We've Met
- 1. "Sway" Released: August 28, 2017; 2. "Worth It" Released: March 5, 2018; 3. "Goodbye Summer" Released: August 27, 2018

I Don't Believe We've Met is the second studio album by American country music singer Danielle Bradbery. It was released on December 1, 2017. The album title, cover, and track listing were revealed on August 4, 2017. According to Bradbery, the album serves as her "reintroduction" into the music world, for it had been four years since the release of her debut album, in 2013.

== Commercial performance ==
The album debuted at No. 41 on Billboard 200, No. 6 on Top Country Albums, selling 11,100 copies (15,000 album-equivalent units) in the first week. As of March 2018, the album has sold 21,900 copies in the United States.

== Critical reception ==
Professional ratings
Review scores
| Source | Rating |
|---|---|
| AllMusic | 3.5/5 stars |

AllMusic reviewer Stephen Thomas Erlewine wrote that "her sophomore album fits into the fluid musical landscape of 2017, adding in hefty doses of electronics, shades of soul, and the occasional retro flashback." Laura Hostelley of Sounds Like Nashville spoke about the album "No longer bounded by traditional country, she experiments with pop and R&B tones to create her own sound."

Rolling Stone praised the album, with writer Luke Levenson commenting, "With crisp production overseen by songwriter Josh Kerr and confessional lyrics, I Don't Believe We've Met challenges any notion people had of the wide-eyed, Blake Shelton-coached ingénue from four years ago."

== Singles ==
The album's lead single, "Sway", was released on June 2, 2017. The single impacted country radio on August 28, 2017. "Worth It" was made available to radio on February 26, 2018, and officially impacted on March 5, 2018, as the second official single. These singles peaked at number 47 and 46 on the Billboard Country Airplay chart, respectively. "Sway" also reached the Top 40 of the Billboard Hot Country Songs chart.

A remixed version of "Hello Summer" featuring Thomas Rhett, entitled "Goodbye Summer", was released digitally on August 3, 2018. It was serviced to country radio as the album's third single on August 27, 2018, and reached a peak of number 39 on the Billboard Country Airplay chart, making it her first Top 40 hit on the chart since her debut single, "The Heart of Dixie," in 2013.

=== Promotional singles ===
The album's first promotional single, "Human Diary," was released on August 11, 2017, along with an "instant grat" music video. "Hello Summer," "Potential," and "Worth It" were released as additional promotional singles on September 22, October 20, and November 10, respectively.

== Track listing ==
| No. | Title | Writer(s) | Producer(s) | Length |
|---|---|---|---|---|
| 1. | "Sway" | Danielle Bradbery; Johan Fansson; Emily Weisband | Josh Kerr | 3:32 |
| 2. | "Potential" | Bradbery; Weisband; Johan Lindbrandt | Kerr | 3:37 |
| 3. | "What Are We Doing" | Bradbery; Weisband; Sam Ellis; Thomas Rhett | Ellis | 3:20 |
| 4. | "Worth It" | Bradbery; Jeff Pardo; Molly Reed | Kerr | 3:28 |
| 5. | "Can't Stay Mad" | Bradbery; Ian Franzino; Andrew Haas; Steph Jones | Afterhrs | 3:28 |
| 6. | "Messy" | Bradbery; Kerr; Hannah Ellis | Kerr | 3:25 |
| 7. | "Red Wine + White Couch" | Weisband; Nicolle Galyon; Alysa Vanderheym | Vanderheym | 3:11 |
| 8. | "Hello Summer" | Rhett; Rhett Akins; Julian Bunetta; Jaren Johnston | Bunetta | 3:00 |
| 9. | "Human Diary" | Kerr; Weisband | Kerr | 3:46 |
| 10. | "Laying Low" | Bradbery; Jason Gantt; Heather Morgan | Gantt | 2:50 |
| Total length: | | | | 33:37 |

== Personnel ==
Adapted from I Don't Believe We've Met liner notes.

- Danielle Bradbery – lead vocals, background vocals
- Julian Bunetta – electric guitar, bass, keyboards, drums, background vocals
- Dave Cohen – keyboards
- David Davidson – strings
- Hannah Ellis – background vocals
- Sam Ellis – acoustic guitar, keyboards, programming, background vocals
- Conni Ellisor – strings
- Ian Franzino – keyboards, programming, background vocals
- Andrew Haas – acoustic guitar, bass, electric guitar, keyboards, programming, background vocals
- Mark Hill – bass
- Evan Hutchings – drums
- Jason Gantt – acoustic guitar, bass, electric guitar, keyboards, programming,
- Jaren Johnston – acoustic guitar
- Steph Jones – background vocals
- Josh Kerr – acoustic guitar, electric guitar, steel guitar, bass, keyboards, programming, background vocals
- Tony Lucido – bass
- Rob McNelley – electric guitar
- Carl Miner – acoustic guitar
- Jordan Minton – background vocals
- Garrett Perales – electric guitar
- Jordan Reynolds – background vocals
- Carole N. Rabinowitz – strings
- Jerry Roe – drums
- John Ryan – electric guitar
- Mark Trussell – electric guitar
- Alysa Vanderheym – acoustic guitar, keyboards, programming
- Nick Wayne – background vocals
- Emily Weisband – background vocals
- Derek Wells – electric guitar
- Kristen Wilkinson – strings

== Chart performance ==
=== Album ===
| Chart (2017) | Peak position |
|---|---|
| US Billboard 200 | 41 |
| US Top Country Albums (Billboard) | 6 |

=== Singles ===
| Year | Single | Peak chart positions | | |
| Year | Single | US Country | US Country Airplay | CAN Country |
|---|---|---|---|---|
| 2017 | "Sway" | 39 | 47 | — |
| 2018 | "Worth It" | 49 | 46 | — |
| 2018 | "Goodbye Summer" (with Thomas Rhett) | 39 | 39 | 49 |
"—" denotes releases that did not chart
