= Hello Summer (song) =

2017 single by Danielle Bradbery

Promotional single by Danielle Bradbery

from the album I Don't Believe We've Met
- Released: September 22, 2017
- Genre: Country pop
- Length: 3:01
- Label: Big Machine
- Songwriter(s): Thomas Rhett; Rhett Akins; Julian Bunetta; Jaren Johnston
- Producer(s): Julian Bunetta

"Hello Summer" is a song recorded by American country music singer Danielle Bradbery for her second studio album, I Don't Believe We've Met (2017). The song was written by Thomas Rhett, Rhett Akins, and Jaren Johnston as well as the track's producer, Julian Bunetta. A solo version by Bradbery was released digitally through Big Machine Records as the album's second promotional single on September 22, 2017. In 2018, "Hello Summer" was re-recorded as a duet with one of its co-writers, Thomas Rhett, and released under the title "Goodbye Summer" as the album's third official radio single.

== Background and recording ==
"Hello Summer" was written by American country singer Thomas Rhett with his father, Rhett Akins, Jaren Johnston of The Cadillac Three, and Rhett's frequent co-writer, Julian Bunetta, in a session intended for his third studio album, Life Changes (2017). The song did not make the final track listing and was instead offered to Bradbery, with whom Rhett had previously collaborated on a re-recording of the track "Playing with Fire" from the deluxe edition of his second album, Tangled Up (2015). Parts of the song were re-written by Rhett and Akins to better suit a female perspective. Bradbery told Entertainment Tonight that while it was one of three songs on I Don't Believe We've Met that she didn't co-write, the song "really speaks to the same emotional theme of the record." In 2018, the song came full circle and was re-recorded as a duet between Rhett and Bradbery, with a few lyrical tweaks incorporating the updated title ("Goodbye Summer") and re-introducing the male perspective.

== Content ==
"Hello Summer" is a country pop song with tropical influences. Lyrically, the song explores the ups and downs of a short-lived seasonal relationship that leaves the narrator heartbroken. While the solo version provides a one-sided look at the relationship, the dual perspectives in "Goodbye Summer" provide a shared sense of less between two people emotionally "heading in different directions."

== Music video ==
An "instant grat" video for the song was directed by Chris Hicky and premiered September 22, 2017. The video eschews a plot-driven storyline in favor of focusing on Bradbery as she sings in front of various scenic backdrops including a forest, fog, and an array of colourful flags.

== Goodbye Summer ==
"Goodbye Summer"

Single by Danielle Bradbery with Thomas Rhett
- Released: August 27, 2018
- Genre: Country pop
- Length: 3:06
- Label: Valory; Big Machine
- Songwriter(s): Thomas Rhett; Rhett Akins; Julian Bunetta; Jaren Johnston
- Producer(s): Julian Bunetta

Danielle Bradbery singles chronology
"Worth It" (2018)	"Goodbye Summer" (2018)	"Never Have I Ever" (2020)

Thomas Rhett singles chronology
"Life Changes" (2018)	"Goodbye Summer" (2018)	"Sixteen" (2018)

A re-recorded duet version featuring both Danielle Bradbery and Thomas Rhett, titled "Goodbye Summer", was released digitally August 3, 2018 and officially impacted country radio on August 27, 2018. Since its release, the song has reached 39 on both the Billboard Hot Country Songs and Country Airplay charts, respectively, marking Bradbery's second-highest peaking effort on either chart. "Goodbye Summer" has also become Bradbery's first single to enter the Canada Country chart since 2013, peaking at number 49.

=== Critical reception ===
Sterling Whitaker of Taste of Country praised the song's pop-influenced production and wrote that "the give-and-take of Bradbery and Rhett's voices... gives the record added depth and appeal." Tiana Timmerberg of Radio.com likewise described the duet partners as "the perfect team" on the song, which serves as "an homage to summer romances".

=== Commercial performance ===
"Goodbye Summer" debuted at number 49 on the Billboard Country Airplay chart dated August 11, 2018, ranking as the week's highest debut. The song has since reached a peak position of 39, making it Bradbery's second-highest-charting single. "Goodbye Summer" debuted at number 39 on the Hot Country Songs chart dated August 18, 2018. This likewise earned Bradbery her second-highest-peaking single on this chart. "Goodbye Summer" debuted at number 49 on the Canada Country chart dated September 22, 2018, becoming Bradbery's first single to chart in Canada since "The Heart of Dixie". The song has sold 8,000 copies in the United States as of August 2018.

=== Charts ===
Chart (2018)	Peak position
Canada Country (Billboard)	49
US Country Airplay (Billboard)	39
US Digital Song Sales (Billboard)	34
US Hot Country Songs (Billboard)	39

== Release history ==
Country	Date	Format	Version	Label	Ref.
Worldwide	September 22, 2017 (Note: Released as a promotional single.)	Digital download	Solo ("Hello Summer")	Big Machine	
Worldwide	August 3, 2018	Digital download	Duet ("Goodbye Summer")	Big Machine	
United States	August 27, 2018	Country radio	Duet ("Goodbye Summer")	Valory; Big Machine	
