= The Swon Brothers (album) =

Studio album by the Swon Brothers
- Released: October 14, 2014
- Genre: Country
- Label: Arista Nashville
- Producer: Mark Bright, The Swon Brothers

The Swon Brothers chronology
The Complete Season 4 Collection (2013)	The Swon Brothers (2014)	Timeless (2016)

Singles from The Swon Brothers
- 1. "Later On" Released: December 10, 2013; 2. "Pray for You" Released: November 3, 2014

The Swon Brothers is the major label debut studio album by American country music duo the Swon Brothers. It was released on October 14, 2014, via Arista Nashville. It includes the top 15 single "Later On". The Swon Brothers produced the album with Mark Bright.

== Track listing ==
No.	Title	Writer(s)	Length
1.	"What I'm Thinking About"	Jon Nite, Jimmy Robbins	3:19
2.	"Later On"	Ryan Hurd, Joey Hyde, Justin Wilson	3:37
3.	"Chasing You Around"	Hurd, Aaron Eshuis	3:55
4.	"Songs That Said It All"	Colton Swon, Zach Swon, Dave Haywood, Charles Kelley	3:18
5.	"Pray for You"	Jessi Alexander, Tommy Lee James, Eric Paslay	3:54
6.	"Breaking"	Jamie Moore, Derrick Southerland	4:01
7.	"95"	Hurd, Frank Rogers, Brad Tursi	3:11
8.	"Pretty Beautiful"	Ben Caver, Megan Conner, Brian Gene White	3:17
9.	"Colder"	Ryan Griffin, Chuck Wicks, Micah Wilshire	3:57
10.	"Same Old Highway"	Adam Craig, Jeff Middleton, Josh Thompson	2:52
11.	"This Side of Heaven" (featuring Carrie Underwood)	Blake Bollinger, Ryan Lafferty, Ben Stennis	3:53

== Personnel ==
The Swon Brothers

- Colton Swon - vocals
- Zach Swon - vocals, keyboards, programming

Additional Musicians

- Eric Darken - percussion
- Dan Dugmore - steel guitar
- Shannon Forrest - drums
- Eric Gillette - electric guitar
- Kenny Greenberg - electric guitar
- Joe Henderson - keyboards, programming
- Mark Hill - bass guitar
- Greg Morrow - drums
- Jimmy Nichols - keyboards, synthesizer strings
- Chris Stevens - programming
- Ilya Toshinsky - acoustic guitar, mandolin, banjo
- Carrie Underwood - background vocals on "This Side of Heaven"

== Chart performance ==
The album debuted on the Billboard 200 at No. 28, and No. 6 on the Top Country Albums chart, with 10,000 copies sold on its debut week. It sold a further 3,400 the next week. The album has sold a total of 34,900 copies in the US as of March 2015.

=== Album ===
Chart (2014)	Peak position
US Billboard 200	28
US Top Country Albums (Billboard)	6

=== Singles ===
Year	Single	Peak chart positions				
Year	Single	US Country	US Country Airplay	US	CAN Country	CAN
2013	"Later On"	21	13	86	47	87
2014	"Pray for You"	—	43	—	—	—
"—" denotes releases that did not chart
