= Danielle Bradbery (album) =

Studio album by Danielle Bradbery
- Released: November 25, 2013
- Recorded: June – September 2013
- Genre: Country
- Length: 40:02
- Label: Big Machine
- Producer: Dann Huff; Brett James

Danielle Bradbery chronology
Danielle Bradbery (2013)	I Don't Believe We've Met (2017)

Singles from Danielle Bradbery
- 1. "The Heart of Dixie" Released: July 16, 2013; 2. "Young in America" Released: April 21, 2014

Danielle Bradbery is the self-titled debut studio album of the American country music singer and The Voice season 4-winner Danielle Bradbery, released on November 25, 2013.

== Background and recording ==
In March 2013, 16-year-old Danielle Bradbery auditioned for season four of the American singing competition The Voice, performing Taylor Swift's "Mean". Adam Levine, Blake Shelton, and Usher all turned around, and Bradbery opted to join 'Team Blake'. Throughout the competition, Bradbery was the first to send a single to the top 10 on iTunes, had the most singles (five) reach that peak, and had the most iTunes downloads of any contestant in the history of the competition. On June 18, 2013, Bradbery was crowned the winner of The Voice, and the next day signed to Big Machine Records.

== Promotion ==
On September 14, 2013, Bradbery performed on the WGTY Great Country Radio stage at the York Fair, where she sang her first single "The Heart of Dixie" as well as four other new songs from the album.

The first single from the album, "The Heart of Dixie", was sent to country radio on July 8, 2013, and was released to digital retailers (via Universal Republic Nashville) July 16, 2013. It was officially solicited to radio on July 22. So far, the song has peaked within the top 20 on the Hot Country chart and the top 30 on the Country Airplay chart. "I Will Never Forget You" was also released as a digital download prior to the album's release. It has charted at number 49 on the Country Digital Songs chart.

The second official single released to radio is "Young in America". Bradbery announced this through her Facebook page on March 28, 2014.

Bradbery revealed details about her upcoming album on October 1 through a live Facebook chat, including the album's title, cover image, and release date. On October 22, Bradbery released the official track list hour by hour via Twitter.

== Critical reception ==
Professional ratings
Review scores
Source	Rating
Roughstock	4/5 stars

The album received positive reviews from critics.

== Track listings ==
All tracks produced by Dann Huff except "The Heart of Dixie", produced by Brett James.

No.	Title	Writer(s)	Length
1.	"Young in America"	Whitney Duncan, Jaren Johnston, Kylie Sackley	3:43
2.	"Wild Boy"	Chris Lindsey, Aimee Mayo, Caitlyn Smith, Troy Verges	3:41
3.	"The Heart of Dixie"	Smith, Brett James, Verges	3:29
4.	"I Will Never Forget You"	Katrina Elam, Josh Kear, Chris Tompkins	3:46
5.	"Endless Summer"	Sarah Buxton, Jedd Hughes, busbee	3:27
6.	"Talk About Love"	Brent Anderson, Jeremy Johnson	3:47
7.	"Never Like This"	Smith, Steve McEwan, Gordie Sampson	3:29
8.	"Daughter of a Workin' Man"	Dave Barnes, Nicolle Galyon, Clint Lagerberg	3:37
9.	"Dance Hall"	April Cushman, Galyon, Molly Reed	3:26
10.	"Yellin' from the Rooftop"	Buxton, busbee	3:35
11.	"My Day"	Ross Copperman, Tom Shapiro, Mallary Hope	4:01
Total length:			40:02

Danielle Bradbery – Deluxe edition (bonus tracks)
No.	Title	Writer(s)	Length
12.	"Jesus, Take the Wheel"	James; Sampson; Hillary Lindsey	3:23
13.	"Born to Fly"	Sara Evans; Marcus Hummon; Darrell Scott	3:14
14.	"Maybe It Was Memphis"	Michael Anderson	3:07
15.	"Who I Am"	James; Verges	3:26
Total length:			53:12

== Personnel ==
- Tim Akers - piano
- Bruce Bouton - steel guitar
- Mike Brignardello - bass
- Tom Bukovac - electric guitar, acoustic guitar, banjo
- J. T. Corenflos - electric guitar
- Chad Cromwell - drums
- Eric Darken - percussion
- Dan Dugmore - steel guitar
- Stuart Duncan - fiddle
- Sam Ellis - backing vocals
- Larry Franklin - mandolin, fiddle
- Paul Franklin - steel guitar
- Tony Harrell - piano
- Dann Huff - electric guitar, 12-string guitar
- Charlie Judge - keyboards, synthesizer
- Tony Lucido - bass
- Jerry McPherson - electric guitar
- Greg Morrow - drums
- Cherie Oakley - backing vocals
- Ethan Pilzer - bass
- Danny Rader - acoustic guitar, mandolin, banjo
- Mike Rojas - piano, accordion
- Jimmie Lee Sloas - bass
- Aaron Sterling - drums
- Ilya Toshinsky - acoustic guitar, mandolin, banjo

== Chart performance ==
Danielle Bradbery's self-titled debut album debuted at No. 5 on the US top country albums chart with first week sales of 41,000 copies. As of June 2014 the album has sold 139,000 copies in the U.S.

=== Weekly charts ===
Chart (2013)	Peak position
US Billboard 200	19
US Top Country Albums (Billboard)	5

=== Year-end charts ===
Chart (2014)	Position
US Billboard 200	185
US Top Country Albums (Billboard)	33

=== Singles ===
Year	Single	Peak chart positions				
Year	Single	US Country	US Country Airplay	US	CAN Country	CAN
2013	"The Heart of Dixie"	16	12	58	46	60
2014	"Young in America"	—	49	—	—	—
"—" denotes releases that did not chart
