= The Swon Brothers =

American country music duo

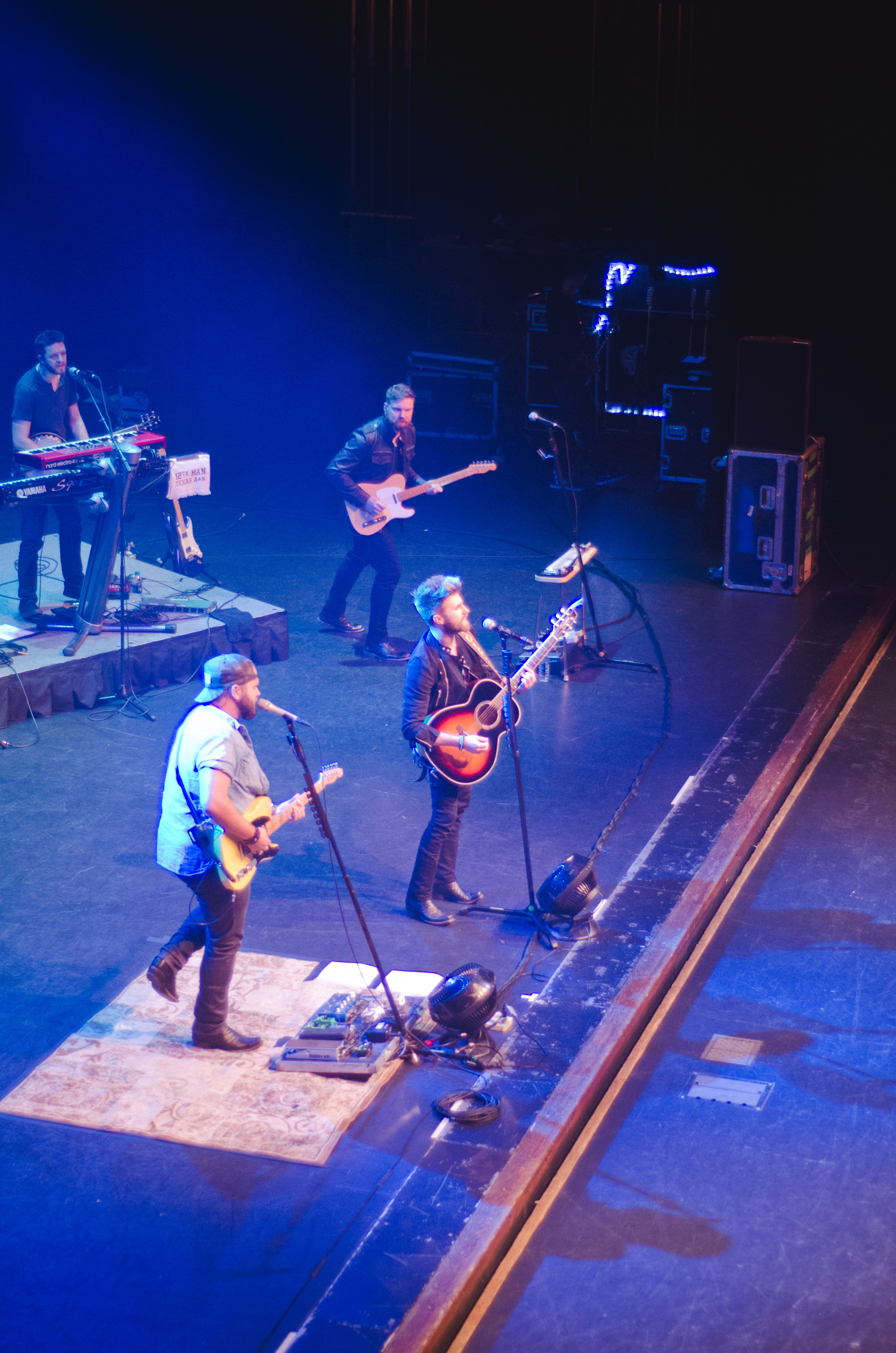
- The Swon Brothers

Background information
- Origin: Muskogee, Oklahoma, U.S.
- Genre: Country
- Years active: 2013–present
- Label: Arista Nashville
- Members: Zach Swon; Colton Swon

The Swon Brothers are an American country music duo from Muskogee, Oklahoma, consisting of Zach Swon (born February 21, 1985) and Colton Swon (born August 17, 1988). In 2013, they finished in third place on the fourth season of NBC's The Voice. They were the first duo to make it from the Top 12 live shows to the season finale.

On November 1, 2013, the Swon Brothers signed a record deal with Arista Nashville which is part of the Sony Music group. They released their first official single, "Later On", the following month. On October 14, 2014, the Swon Brothers released their self-titled debut album, before parting ways with Arista the following year.

== Early life ==
The Swon Brothers, Zach and Colton, were born in Muskogee, Oklahoma, to Kelly and Tammy Swon. Colton Swon was born on August 17, 1988, while Zach was born on February 21, 1985. Colton attended elementary school in Hilldale, Muskogee, and later attended school with his brother Zach in Oktaha, where he left after eighth grade to go to Hilldale High School. Zach Swon studied at the Northeastern State University and worked at the Oklahoma Music Hall of Fame in Muskogee.

The brothers started performing when they were children, touring with their parents' Southern gospel group Exodus, and performing in various local events and stages. By the time Zach Swon was 9 or 10, he was playing drums for his parents’ band. In 1995, the Swon Brothers’ parents formed a family-style variety show in Wagoner called Westwood Music Show, where the Brothers performed songs ranging from Elvis to Frank Sinatra, as well as starting to perform in the country music genre. In 2000, when they were 12 and 15, the brothers started calling themselves The Swon Brothers, and appeared in various venues.

In 2007, Colton Swon auditioned for the seventh season of American Idol (aired 2008) and reached the Top 48. Both Zach and Colton also appeared as contestants in 2007 on a local TV show Gimme the Mike. The Swon Brothers have released a couple of independent albums with songs including "Oklahoma Lovin’" and "This Close to Gone". Their first professionally recorded album Another Day, which they described as modern country, was released on January 16, 2009. They cited The Eagles as their musical influence.

== The Voice ==
The Swon Brothers auditioned for The Voice on a whim when asked by their keyboard player, James Redden, who wanted them to audition with him. During the blind auditions, The Swon Brothers performed Tom Petty and the Heartbreakers's "American Girl", turning three chairs, Usher, Blake Shelton, and Shakira on April 1, 2013. They proceeded to choose Blake as their coach and remained on his team the whole season. During the Top 8 Live Performances, The Swon Brothers chose to sing Seven Bridges Road as a tribute to victims of the 2013 Moore tornado. They finished in third place making them the farthest duo in the voice.

– Studio version of performance reached the top 10 on iTunes

Stage	Song	Original Artist	Date	Order	Result
Blind Audition	"American Girl"	Tom Petty and the Heartbreakers	March 26, 2013	3.1	Blake Shelton, Shakira, and Usher turned Joined Team Blake
Battle Rounds	"I Won't Back Down" (vs. Christian Porter)	Tom Petty	April 15, 2013	7.5	Saved by Coach
Knockout Rounds	"Drift Away" (vs. Grace Askew)	John Henry Kurtz	April 30, 2013	12.7	Saved by Coach
Live Playoffs (Top 16)	"Fishin' in the Dark"	The Nitty Gritty Dirt Band	May 7, 2013	15.4	Saved by Coach
Live Top 12	"Who's Gonna Fill Their Shoes"	George Jones	May 13, 2013	17.5	Saved by Public Vote
Live Top 10	"How Country Feels"	Randy Houser	May 20, 2013	20.3	Saved by Public Vote
Live Top 8	"Seven Bridges Road"	Steve Young	May 27, 2013	22.3	Saved by Public Vote
Live Top 6	"Wagon Wheel"	Old Crow Medicine Show	June 3, 2013	25.3	Saved by Public Vote
Live Top 6	"Okie From Muskogee"	Merle Haggard	June 3, 2013	25.7	Saved by Public Vote
Live Top 5 (Semifinals)	"Turn the Page"	Bob Seger	June 10, 2013	27.1	Saved by Public Vote
Live Top 5 (Semifinals)	"Danny's Song"	Loggins and Messina	June 10, 2013	27.6	Saved by Public Vote
Live Finale	"I Can't Tell You Why"	Eagles	June 17, 2013	29.1	Third place
Live Finale	"Danny's Song"	Loggins and Messina	June 17, 2013	29.4	Third place
Live Finale	"Celebrity" (with Blake Shelton)	Brad Paisley	June 17, 2013	29.6	Third place

== Post-The Voice career ==
The Swon Brothers signed a recording contract with Arista Nashville after appearing in The Voice. They released a single "Later On" on December 10, 2013, the first single from their self-titled album released on October 14, 2014. They debuted the single on The Voice the same day. It sold 23,000 copies in its debut week. In October 2015, the duo parted ways with Arista due to creative differences. On January 29, 2016, they released the EP Timeless. They also opened for Carrie Underwood's Storyteller Tour in 2016.

== Discography ==
=== Albums ===
Title	Album details	Peak chart positions		Sales
Title	Album details	US Country	US	Sales
Another Day	Release date: March 23, 2009; Label: The Swon Brothers; Formats: CD, music download	—	—	
Set List	Release date: August 29, 2012; Label: The Swon Brothers; Formats: CD, music download	—	—	
The Swon Brothers	Release date: October 14, 2014; Label: Arista Nashville; Formats: CD, music download	6	28	US: 34,900
"—" denotes releases that did not chart

=== Compilation albums ===
Title	Album details	Peak chart positions			Sales
Title	Album details	US Country	US	CAN	Sales
The Complete Season 4 Collection (The Voice Performance)	Release date: June 19, 2013; Label: Republic Records; Formats: CD, music download	18	65	93	US: 7,000

=== Extended plays ===
Title	Album details	Peak chart positions		Sales
Title	Album details	US Country	US Indie	Sales
Timeless	Release date: January 29, 2016; Label: TSB Records; Formats: Music download	19	15	US: 1,800
Pretty Cool Scars	Release date: March 17, 2017; Label: TSB Records; Formats: Music download	—	—	

=== Singles ===
Year	Single	Peak chart positions					Sales	Album
Year	Single	US Country	US Country Airplay	US	CAN Country	CAN	Sales	Album
2013	"Later On"	21	13	86	47	87	US: 205,000	The Swon Brothers
2014	"Pray for You"	—	43	—	—	—		The Swon Brothers
2017	"Don't Call Me"	—	—	—	—	—		Pretty Cool Scars
2018	"What Ever Happened"	—	—	—	—	—		TBA
2018	"Midnight Lovers"	—	—	—	—	—		TBA
"—" denotes releases that did not chart

=== Competition singles ===
Year	Single	Peak chart positions			Sales for competition week	Total Sales	Album
Year	Single	US Country	US	CAN	Sales for competition week	Total Sales	Album
2013	"Fishin' in the Dark"	44	—	—			The Complete Season 4 Collection
2013	"Who's Gonna Fill Their Shoes"	32	114	—	30,000	36,000	The Complete Season 4 Collection
2013	"How Country Feels"	45	—	—			The Complete Season 4 Collection
2013	"Seven Bridges Road"	36	—	—	21,000		The Complete Season 4 Collection
2013	"Wagon Wheel"	41	—	—	22,000		The Complete Season 4 Collection
2013	"Okie from Muskogee"	49	—	—	14,000		The Complete Season 4 Collection
2013	"Danny's Song"	16	66	53	73,000; 63,000^{A}	136,000	The Complete Season 4 Collection
2013	"Turn the Page"	29	90	76	47,000		The Complete Season 4 Collection
2013	"I Can't Tell You Why"	29	99	—	44,000		The Complete Season 4 Collection
2013	"Celebrity" (with Blake Shelton)	47	—	—	16,000		The Complete Season 4 Collection
"—" denotes releases that did not chart

^Note A Repeat performance in finale.

=== Music videos ===
Year	Video	Director
2014	"Later On"	Roman White
2015	"Pray for You"	David Poag
2017	"Don't Call Me"	Jeff Johnson
