= Worth It (Danielle Bradbery song) =

Single by Danielle Bradbery

from the album I Don't Believe We've Met
- Released: March 5, 2018
- Recorded: 2017
- Genre: Country blues
- Length: 3:31 (remix single)
- Label: Nashville Harbor
- Songwriters: Danielle Bradbery; Jeff Pardo; Molly Reed
- Producer: Josh Kerr

Danielle Bradbery singles chronology
"Sway" (2017)	"Worth It" (2018)	"Goodbye Summer" (2018)

"Worth It" is a song recorded by the American country music singer Danielle Bradbery for her second studio album, I Don't Believe We've Met (2017). Bradbery co-wrote the song with Jeff Pardo and Molly Reed; it was produced by Josh Kerr. "Worth It" was first released digitally as the album's fourth and final promotional single on November 10, 2017, and was promoted to American country radio through Nashville Harbor Records & Entertainment on March 5, 2018, as the second official single.

== Content and themes ==
"Worth It" is a bluesy, piano-driven ballad in which Bradbery asserts her self-value. The song's lyrics express both vulnerability and indignation towards the way Bradbery has been treated by former lovers, while she claims on the chorus that she is not afraid to walk away from a relationship if she is not given the respect she deserves. Bradbery employs a melisma technique in her vocal delivery as well as "bending" notes to give the song a more soulful sound.

According to Stephen L. Betts of Rolling Stone, the song captures the "zeitgeist of empowerment and self-worth" present at the time of the song's release, with its lyrical content being characterized as feminist. Bradbery reported that the song was written in response to her concerns about her career and, while applicable to a relationship, is ultimately about "standing up for yourself in any situation".

== Release and promotion ==
"Worth It" was released to digital retailers as the album's fourth and final promotional single on November 10, 2017. The song was announced as the second official single through the Billboard Country Update newsletter on February 20, 2018, and was made available to country radio stations on February 26. It officially impacted the format on March 5, 2018. A remixed version of the song was released digitally on March 9, 2018.

On December 1, 2017, Bradbery performed the song live on Megyn Kelly Today. Her performance was praised for highlighting both her "powerhouse vocals" and the "emotional heft" of the song's message. Bradbery appeared as a musical guest on the December 5, 2017, episode of the thirteenth season of The Voice and performed "Worth It". Sterling Whitaker of Taste of Country wrote that her performance "demonstrated all over again why she dominated [her season]".

== Critical reception ==
Jewly Hight of NPR wrote that Bradbery's melismatic delivery "brings a bit more authority to her indignation" on the track. Praising the lyrical content, Stephen L. Betts of Rolling Stone wrote that Bradbery "could be poised for a major breakthrough" at country radio with "Worth It".

== Chart performance ==
"Worth It" sold 6,000 copies in its first week of release and entered the Country Digital Songs chart at number 23. The song debuted at number 49 on the Hot Country Songs chart dated December 2, 2017, becoming her first song to appear on the chart (outside of releases from The Voice) that was not actively being promoted as a single at the time. After the song first became available to radio stations, "Worth It" debuted at number 55 on the Country Airplay chart dated March 3, 2018. It later reached a peak position of 46. The song had sold 15,000 copies in the United States as by December 2017.

== Music video ==
An "instant grat" video was premiered on Bradbery's Vevo channel on November 10, 2017, following the song's digital release. It was directed by Keith J. Leman. Bradbery is lit in shades of blue, red and purple throughout the video to convey her bruised spirit.

The official music video for the song was directed by Shaun Silva and was premiered May 18, 2018. The video was inspired by Jenny Lind's performance of "Never Enough", as seen in the film The Greatest Showman. It was filmed at the CMA Theater at the Country Music Hall of Fame in Nashville.

== Track listing ==
Digital download – promotional single

1. "Worth It" – 3:27

Digital download – remix single

1. "Worth It" (Remix) – 3:31

== Charts ==
Chart (2017–18)	Peak position
US Country Airplay (Billboard)	46
US Hot Country Songs (Billboard)	49

== Release history ==
Country	Date	Format	Label	Ref.
Worldwide	November 10, 2017	Digital download – promotional single	Big Machine	
United States	March 5, 2018	Country radio	BMLG	
Worldwide	March 9, 2018	Digital download – remix single	BMLG	
