= BoA videography =

BoA videography discography
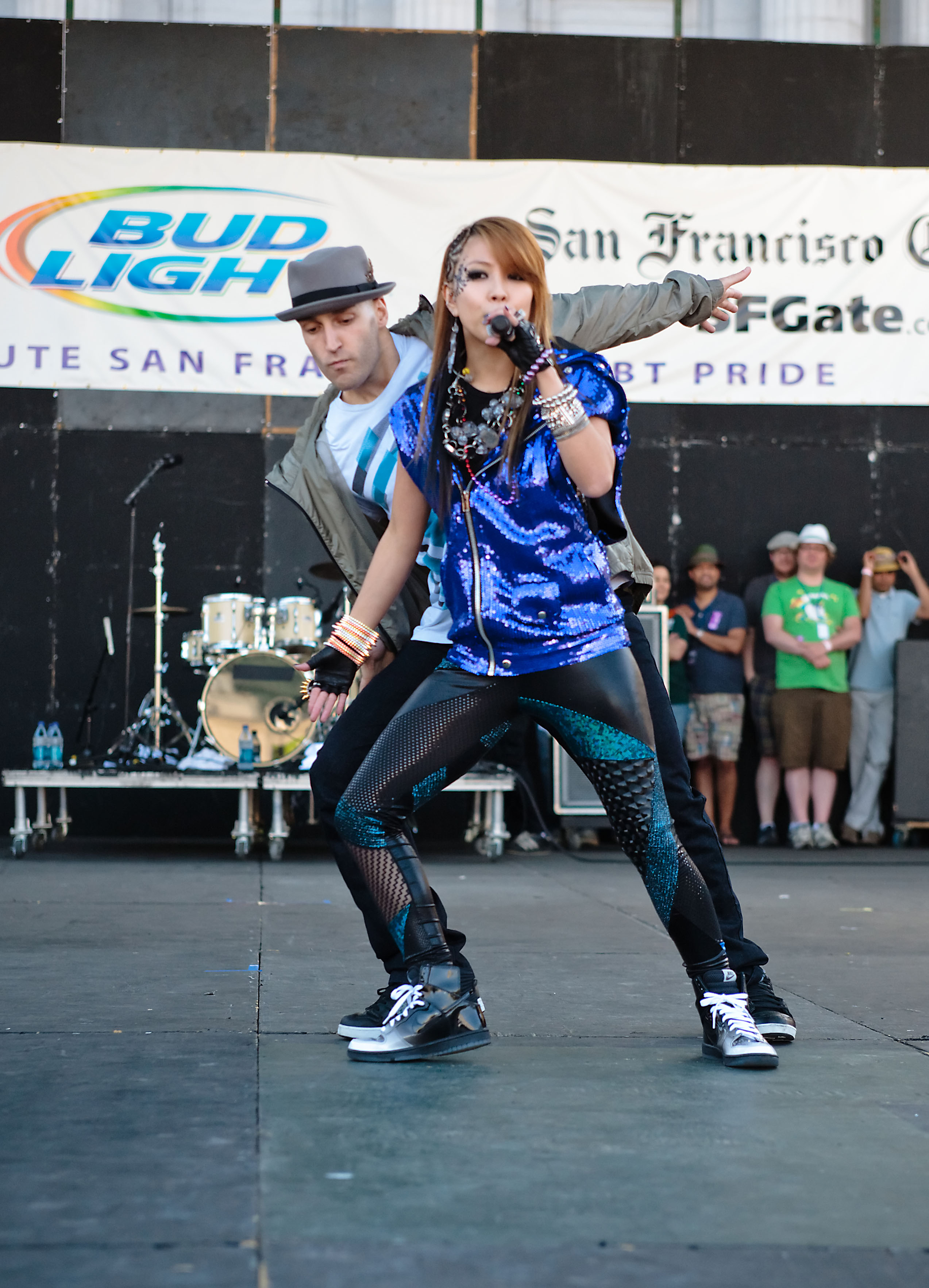
- BoA performing in San Francisco (2009)
- Video albums: 15
- Music videos: 107

BoA has released more than 100 music videos since her debut in 2000, for songs performed in Korean, Japanese and English. Since 2003, BoA has released 15 video albums, primarily recordings of her concert tours in Japan. These video albums have been commercially successful in Japan and Taiwan, consistently reaching the top 10 in both regions. BoA's most successful video album is the music video collection 8 Films (2003), which was certified gold by the Recording Industry Association of Japan for 100,000 copies shipped to stores.

== List of music videos ==
=== English ===
==== Albums ====
BoA

- "Eat You Up"
- "I Did It for Love"
- "Energetic"

==== Other ====
- "Amazing Kiss" (English Version)
- "Flying Without Wings" - Westlife featuring BoA
- "Show Me What You Got" - Bratz feat. BoA & Howie D. (Backstreet Boys)
- "Everything Needs Love" feat. BoA - Mondo Grosso
- "Everything Needs Love" feat. BoA (Live Ver.) - Mondo Grosso

=== Korean ===
==== Albums ====
ID; Peace B

- "ID; Peace B"
- "Sara"

Jumping into the World

- "Don't start now"

No.1

- "No. 1"
- "Waiting.." (늘..)
- "My Sweetie"
- "Listen to my Heart"

Miracle

- "Destiny" (기적)
- "Every Heart"
- "Valenti"

Altantis Princess

- "Atlantis Princess" (아틀란티스 소녀)
- "Milky Way"

Shine We Are

- "Shine We Are!"

My Name

- "My Name"
- "My Prayer"
- "Stay in Love" (바보같죠)

Girls on Top

- "Girls on Top / Autumn Letter" (가을편지)
- "Moto"

Hurricane Venus

- "Game"
- "Hurricane Venus"

Copy & Paste

- "Copy & Paste"

Only One

- "Only One (Dance ver.)"
- "Only One (Drama ver.)"
- "The Shadow"

Kiss My Lips

- "Who Are You"
- "Kiss My Lips"

One Shot, Two Shot

- "CAMO"
- "NEGA DOLA"
- "One Shot, Two Shot"

WOMAN

- "Woman"

Starry Night

- "Starry Night"

Better

- "Better"

Forgive Me

- "Forgive Me"

Crazier

- "Crazier"

==== Singles ====
- "Double"
- "Rock with You"
- "Merry-Chri" (메리-크리)
- "Everlasting"
- "Key of Heart"
- "Disturbance"
- "Feedback"
- "Emptiness"

==== Other ====
Special Collaboration - Anyband (BoA, Xiah Junsu, Jin Bora, Tablo)

- "TPL (Talk, Play, Love) / Promise U"

SM Station featured

- "No Matter What" (BoA X Beenzino)
- "Music is Wonderful" (BeatBurger Feat. BoA)
- "Spring Rain'" ('봄비)
- "Man In The Mirror" (BoA X Siedah Garrett)

SM Town featured

- "Look Outside the Window" (Winter Vacation 2000)
- "Angel Eyes" (Winter Vacation 2001)
- "Summer Vacation" (Summer Vacation 2002)
- "My Angel, My Light" (Winter Vacation 2002)
- "Hello Summer" (Summer Vacation 2003)
- "Summer in Dream" (Summer Vacation 2003)
- "Snowflake" (Winter Vacation 2003)
- "Hot Mail" (여름편지) (Summer Vacation 2004)
- "Red Sun" (태양은 가득히) (Summer Vacation 2006)
- "Snow Dream" (Winter Vacation 2006)
- "Let's Go on a Trip" (여행을 떠나요) (Summer Vacation 2007)
- "Only Love" (사랑 하나죠) (Winter Vacation 2007)
- "Dear My Family (Live Concert Ver.)" (Tribute to Jonghyun) (SM Station 2)
- "This is Your Day (for every child, UNICEF)" (SM Station X)

Promotions and featured songs

- "Midnight Parade" (stream & promo only - Winter Vacation 2003)
- "The Lights of Seoul" (promo only)
- "Tri-Angle" (TVXQ feat. BoA & TRAX)
- "The Love Bug" (M-Flo Tour 2007 Cosmicolor) (stream & promo only)
- "Hey Boy, Hey Girl" (Seamo feat. BoA)
- "Autopilot" (Junoflo feat. BoA)

=== Japanese ===
==== Albums ====
Listen to My Heart

- "ID; Peace B"
- "Amazing Kiss"
- "Kimochi wa Tsutawaru"
- "Listen to My Heart"
- "Every Heart: Minna no Kimochi"

Valenti

- "Valenti"
- "Kiseki"
- "Jewel Song"

Love & Honesty

- "Shine We Are!"
- "Double"
- "Rock with You"
- "Be the One"

Best of Soul

- "Quincy"
- "Merikuri"

Outgrow

- "Do the Motion"
- "Make a Secret"
- "Dakishimeru"
- "Everlasting"

Made in Twenty (20)

- "Nanairo no Ashita: Brand New Beat"
- "Key of Heart"
- "Winter Love"

The Face

- "Sweet Impact"
- "Love Letter"
- "Lose Your Mind" (feat. Yutaka Furukawa from Doping Panda)
- "Be With You"

Best&USA

- "Kissing You"
- "Sparkling"
- "Eien"

Identity

- "Bump Bump!" feat. Verbal (m-flo)
- "Mamoritai: White Wishes"
- "Possibility"

Who's Back?

- "First Time"
- "Shout It Out"
- "Only One"
- "Message"
- "Woo Weekend"
- "Milestone"
- "Masayume Chasing"
- "The Shadow"
- "Tail of Hope"

Watashi Kono Mama de Ii no Kana

- "FLY"
- "Lookbook"
- "Jazzclub"
- "Watashi Kono Mama de Ii no Kana"
- "AMOR"
- "Suki da yo -MY LOVE-"

==== Other ====
- "Holiday" (Palmdrive feat. BoA & Firstklas)
- "The Love Bug" (m-flo Loves BoA)
- "Everlasting" (Premium Version) (stream & promo only)
- "Lady Galaxy" live from Arena Tour 2007 Made in Twenty (20) (promo only)
- "Nanairo no Ashita: Brand New Beat" live from Arena Tour 2007 Made in Twenty (20) (promo only)
- "Hey Boy, Hey Girl" (Seamo feat. BoA)
- "Be With You" (Movie Version) (promo only)
- "Girl in the Mirror" live from Live Tour 2008 The Face (promo only)
- "Lazer" live from Live Tour 2010 Identity (promo only)
- "Woo Weekend"
- "Believe in Love"
- "Everything Needs Love"
- "The Greatest"

== Video albums ==
=== Music video collections ===
List of media, with selected chart positions
| Title | Album details | Peak positions | | Certifications |
| Title | Album details | JPN | TWN (Note: Position was taken from 2005 week 29 for BoA Arena Tour 2005, 2007 week 13 for BoA the Live and BoA Complete Clips 2004—2006, 2007 week 37 for BoA Arena Tour 2007, 2008 week 14 for The Live 2008, 2008 week 44 for Live Tour 2008, 2010 week 11 for The Live 2009, 2010 week 35 for Live Tour 2010, 2011 week 20 for The Live 2010, 2012 week 13 for The Live 2011.) | Certifications |
|---|---|---|---|---|
| 8 Films | DVD release titled 8 Films & More; Released: March 19, 2003 (JPN); Label: Avex; Formats: VHS, DVD | 3 | — | RIAJ: Gold |
| BoA Complete Clips 2004—2006 | Released: March 7, 2007 (JPN); Label: Avex; Formats: DVD, VCD | 6 | 4 | |

=== Live concert recordings ===
List of media, with selected chart positions
| Title | Album details | Peak positions | | |
| Title | Album details | JPN DVD | JPN Blu-ray | TWN DVD |
|---|---|---|---|---|
| BoA FIRST LIVE TOUR 2003 -VALENTI- | Released: July 2, 2003 (JPN); Re-released: December 8, 2004 (JPN); Re-released: March 1, 2006 (JPN); Label: Avex; Formats: DVD, VCD | 3 | — | — |
| BoA LIVE TOUR 2004 -LOVE & HONESTY- | Released: July 7, 2004 (JPN); Re-released: March 1, 2006 (JPN); Label: Avex; Formats: DVD, VCD | 4 | — | — |
| BoA ARENA TOUR 2005 -BEST OF SOUL- | Released: July 6, 2005 (JPN); Re-released: December 5, 2007 (JPN); Label: Avex; Formats: 2DVDs, VCD | 5 | — | 4 |
| BoA the LIVE Ura BoA... Kikase Kei (裏ボア・・・聴かせ系; "The Other Side of BoA...Listen Style") | Released: March 7, 2007 (JPN); Re-released: March 18, 2009 (JPN); Label: Avex; Formats: DVD, VCD | 4 | — | 2 |
| BoA ARENA TOUR 2007: MADE IN TWENTY (20) | Released: August 8, 2007 (JPN); Re-released: March 18, 2009 (JPN); Label: Avex; Formats: 2DVDs, DVD, VCD | 3 | — | 3 |
| BoA THE LIVE "X'mas" | Released: March 19, 2008 (JPN); Label: Avex; Formats: DVD | 27 | — | — |
| BoA LIVE TOUR 2008 -THE FACE- | Released: September 17, 2008 (JPN); Label: Avex; Formats: DVD, VCD | 3 | — | 2 |
| BoA THE LIVE 2009 "X'mas" | Released: March 3, 2010 (JPN); Label: Avex; Formats: DVD | 12 | — | 2 |
| BoA LIVE TOUR 2010: IDENTITY | Released: August 18, 2010 (JPN); Label: Avex; Formats: DVD | 4 | — | 2 |
| BoA THE LIVE 2010 "X'mas" | Released: May 4, 2011 (JPN); Label: Avex; Formats: DVD | 14 | — | 4 |
| BoA THE LIVE 2011 “X'mas” ~The 10th Anniversary Edition~ | Released: March 7, 2012 (JPN); Label: Avex; Formats: DVD | 18 | — | 15 |
| BoA LIVE TOUR 2014 ~WHO'S BACK?~ | Released: February 25, 2015 (JPN); Label: Avex; Formats: DVD, Blu-ray | 32 | 43 | — |
| SPECIAL LIVE: Here I am | Released: July 2, 2015 (KOR); Label: SM; Formats: 2DVDs | — | — | — |
| BoA Special Live NOWNESS in JAPAN | Released: May 30, 2016 (JPN); Label: Avex; Formats: 2DVDs, Blu-ray | 33 | 35 | — |
| BoA THE LIVE 2018 ~Unchained~ | Released: October 10, 2018 (JPN); Label: Avex; Formats: DVD, Blu-ray | 17 | 21 | — |
| BoA THE LIVE 2018“X’mas” | Released: August 7, 2019 (JPN); Label: Avex; Formats: DVD, Blu-ray | 31 | 41 | — |
| BoA LIVE TOUR 2019 -#mood- | Released: February 19, 2020 (JPN); Label: Avex; Formats: DVD, Blu-ray | 19 | 26 | — |

=== Documentaries and educational videos ===
| Title | Album details |
|---|---|
| History of BoA 2000—2002 | Released: August 18, 2003 (KOR); Label: SM; Formats: DVD |
| Uta de Manabu Kankokugo: BoA "No. 1" (歌で学ぶ韓国語; "Korean Learnt Through Songs") | Released: July 25, 2008 (JPN); Label: Avex; Formats: DVD |
