= Pray for You (The Swon Brothers song) =

Single by The Swon Brothers

from the album The Swon Brothers
- Released: November 3, 2014
- Genre: Country
- Length: 3:54
- Label: Arista Nashville
- Songwriter(s): Jessi Alexander; Tommy Lee James; Eric Paslay
- Producer(s): Mark Bright; The Swon Brothers

The Swon Brothers singles chronology
"Later On" (2013)	"Pray for You" (2014)	"Don't Call Me" (2017)

"Pray for You" is a song recorded by American country music duo The Swon Brothers for their self-titled debut album (2014). The song was written by Jessi Alexander, Tommy Lee James, and Eric Paslay, and was produced by Mark Bright and The Swon Brothers. It was first released to digital retailers September 23, 2014 as the first promotional single off the album, and was subsequently serviced to American country radio on November 3, 2014, as the album's second official single.

== Critical reception ==
Carrie Horton at Taste of Country praised the song for being a "solid, if not ground-breaking" follow-up to "Later On". In particular, Horton complimented the balancing of the lyrics' mature message with the more upbeat production, writing: "The drums are heavy, the guitars are swaggering and the vocal performances from Zach and Colton Swon are layered and just edgy enough to add complexity and a bit of good fun to a somewhat serious song."

== Music video ==
The music video was directed by David Poag and premiered in February 2015.

== Chart performance ==
Chart (2014–15)	Peak position
US Country Airplay (Billboard)	43

== Release history ==
Country	Date	Format	Label	Ref.
United Kingdom	September 23, 2014	Digital download	Arista Nashville	
United States	September 23, 2014	Digital download	Arista Nashville	
United States	November 3, 2014	Country radio	Arista Nashville	
