= The Heart of Dixie (song) =

Single by Danielle Bradbery

from the album Danielle Bradbery
- Released: July 16, 2013
- Recorded: 2013
- Genre: Country; country folk
- Length: 3:29
- Label: Big Machine; Republic Nashville
- Songwriters: Brett James; Caitlyn Smith; Troy Verges
- Producer: Brett James

Danielle Bradbery singles chronology
"The Heart of Dixie" (2013)	"Young in America" (2014)

"The Heart of Dixie" is a song written by Brett James, Troy Verges and Caitlyn Smith, and recorded by American country music artist Danielle Bradbery. It was released on July 16, 2013, as her debut single after being crowned the winner of the fourth season of The Voice, and the lead single of her eponymous debut album Danielle Bradbery.

== Composition ==
The song is in the key of G♭ major and has a moderate tempo of 84 beats per minute. The verses are in 7/4 time signature (3+4+3+4) before changing to 4/4 in the chorus

== Critical reception ==
Billy Dukes of country music blog Taste of Country gave the song a mixed review, stating that although Bradbery's "natural sweetness" shines in her "admirable" performance, the sixteen-year-old lacks the experience and conviction needed to be a good musical storyteller. Roughstock responded more positively to the song, which contributor Matt Bjorke felt was right "in her element" and left him feeling "excited to hear what she has in store for her full-length debut album". Bjorke lauded the "timeless arrangement" as well as Bradbery's delivery, which he described as having "the confidence of someone... twice her age". Nashville Gab gave the song an A− rating for "[tapping] into what Danielle does best" and highlighting her "effortless" and "authentic" vocals. The blog cited such influences as The Dixie Chicks and Carrie Underwood in declaring "The Heart of Dixie" exemplary of "country-pop at its finest".

== Music video ==
The music video was directed by Shane Drake and premiered September 23, 2013. The Music video starts off with Bradbery arriving at the Butterfly Hollow along with her friends. There are scenes where Dixie is packing up her things and hitting the road. Bradbery eventually meets an older Dixie who is the owner of Butterfly Hollow.

== Chart performance ==
"The Heart of Dixie" debuted at number 60 on the U.S. Billboard Country Airplay chart for the week of July 27, 2013. As of March 2014, The song has sold 375,000 copies in the US.

Chart (2013–2014)	Peak position
Canada Country (Billboard)	46
Canada Hot 100 (Billboard)	60
US Billboard Hot 100	58
US Country Airplay (Billboard)	12
US Hot Country Songs (Billboard)	16

=== Year-end charts ===
Chart (2014)	Position
US Country Airplay (Billboard)	65
US Hot Country Songs (Billboard)	68

== Certifications ==
Region	Certification	Certified units/sales
United States (RIAA)	Gold	500,000^{‡}
^{‡} Sales+streaming figures based on certification alone.
