= Danielle Bradbery =

American country pop singer (born 1996)

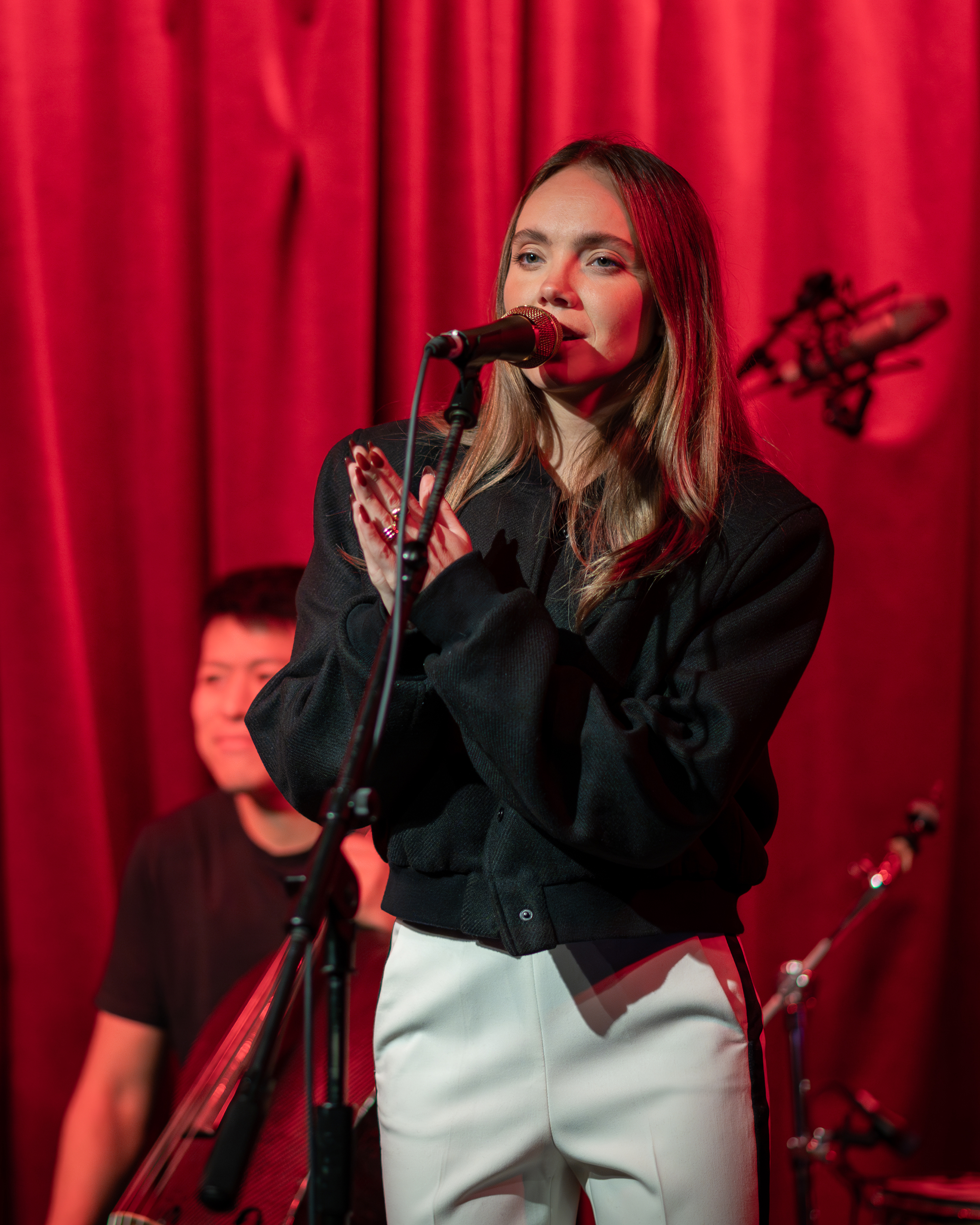
- Bradbery in 2024

Background information
- Born: Danielle Simone Bradbery; July 23, 1996 (age 30); Houston, Texas, U.S.
- Genre: Country pop
- Occupation: Singer
- Years active: 2013–present
- Labels: D.B Records; Big Machine; BMLG; Republic Records
- Website: daniellebradbery.com

Danielle Simone Bradbery (born July 23, 1996) is an American country pop singer. She won season 4 of NBC's The Voice in 2013, becoming the then-youngest winner of the competition, at age 16. (Note: Bradbery's record has since been eclipsed by Sawyer Fredericks (season 8), Brynn Cartelli (season 14), and Carter Rubin (season 19).) Since then, she has released three albums and multiple singles.

Bradbery's debut studio album, Danielle Bradbery, was released on November 25, 2013. Her second album, I Don't Believe We've Met, was released on December 1, 2017. A collection of songs, In Between: The Collection, was released on March 4, 2022. Bradbery's third album, Danielle, was released on September 6, 2024.

== Early life ==
Bradbery was born on July 23, 1996, in Houston, Texas to parents Danny Bradbery and Gloria Redden Martinez and moved to Cypress. She attended Cypress Ranch High School.

== Career ==
=== The Voice (2013) ===
During the blind auditions of The Voice aired on March 25, 2013, Bradbery performed Taylor Swift's "Mean", prompting Adam Levine, Blake Shelton, and Usher to turn their chairs. Bradbery then chose Shelton and remained on his team. At the Battle rounds, Bradbery faced Caroline Glaser where they sang the song "Put Your Records On", Bradbery was chosen over Glaser, in the process advanced to the Knockout rounds. During the Knockouts, Bradbery sang "Jesus Take The Wheel" against Taylor Beckham in which Blake selected her to remain in the competition, sending home Beckham. During the Top 16 show, she sang "Maybe It Was Memphis" and was voted through by America into the next week. The following week, the country singer sang a rendition of Carrie Underwood's song "Wasted". During the Top 10 playoffs, Bradbery sang a rendition of "Heads Carolina, Tails California", which became the first song of the season, and only song of that round, to reach the iTunes top 10 charts.

During the Top 8, Bradbery sang a rendition of "Grandpa (Tell Me 'Bout the Good Ol' Days)". In the Top 6, she sang Pam Tillis' "Shake the Sugar Tree" chosen by coach Blake Shelton. That week, she also sang Sara Evans' "A Little Bit Stronger", ending the song with a high note through the final "stronger" and "yeah" run. During the Top 5, Bradbery sang "Please Remember Me" and "Who I Am" which reached 6 and 4 spots respectively on the iTunes top 10 charts. During "Who I Am", she walked out through the audience to sing beside her parents and stepmother. At the finals, Bradbery sang the song "Timber, I'm Falling in Love" along with her coach Blake Shelton, she also re-sang the song "Maybe It Was Memphis" which reached the iTunes top 10 charts and sang the song "Born to Fly" before she was announced as the winner of season four of The Voice. She had the most peak positions and most singles to reach the top 10 on iTunes during the season. Overall, she had more iTunes downloads than any other contestant in the show's history. At age 16, Bradbery was the youngest winner of The Voice at the time. This record was later eclipsed by Sawyer Fredericks (who won season 8 at age 16), and later by Brynn Cartelli (who won season 14 at age 15). and Carter Rubin (who won season 19 at age 15).

– Studio version of performance reached the top 10 on iTunes

Stage	Song	Original artist	Date	Order	Result
Blind Audition	"Mean"	Taylor Swift	March 25, 2013	1.5	Adam Levine, Blake Shelton, and Usher turned Joined Team Blake
Battles (Top 48)	"Put Your Records On" (vs. Caroline Glaser)	Corinne Bailey Rae	April 16, 2013	8.6	Saved by Blake
Knockouts (Top 32)	"Jesus Take The Wheel" (vs. Taylor Beckham)	Carrie Underwood	April 30, 2013	12.5	Saved by Blake
Live Playoffs	"Maybe It Was Memphis"	Pam Tillis	May 7, 2013	15.7	Saved by Public Vote
Live Top 12	"Wasted"	Carrie Underwood	May 13, 2013	17.8	Saved by Public Vote
Live Top 10	"Heads Carolina, Tails California"	Jo Dee Messina	May 20, 2013	20.7	Saved by Public Vote
Live Top 8	"Grandpa (Tell Me 'Bout the Good Ol' Days)"	The Judds	May 27, 2013	22.7	Saved by Public Vote
Live Top 6	"Shake the Sugar Tree"	Pam Tillis	June 3, 2013	25.5	Saved by Public Vote
Live Top 6	"A Little Bit Stronger"	Sara Evans	June 3, 2013	25.11	Saved by Public Vote
Live Top 5 (Semi-finals)	"Please Remember Me"	Rodney Crowell	June 10, 2013	27.4	Saved by Public Vote
Live Top 5 (Semi-finals)	"Who I Am"	Jessica Andrews	June 10, 2013	27.8	Saved by Public Vote
Live Finale (Final 3)	"Timber, I'm Falling in Love" (with Blake Shelton)	Patty Loveless	June 17, 2013	29.3	Winner
Live Finale (Final 3)	"Maybe It Was Memphis"	Pam Tillis	June 17, 2013	29.7	Winner
Live Finale (Final 3)	"Born to Fly"	Sara Evans	June 17, 2013	29.9	Winner

=== 2013–2014: Danielle Bradbery ===
On June 19, 2013, the day after Bradbery won The Voice, she was signed to a record deal with Big Machine Records. Her debut single, "The Heart of Dixie", was released on July 16, 2013. Bradbery's first studio album, self-titled Danielle Bradbery, was released November 25, 2013. On September 14, 2013, Bradbery performed on the WGTY Great Country Radio stage at the York Fair and sang four songs from her upcoming album, which were "Young in America", "Dance Hall", "Never Like This" and "Daughter of a Working Man". Bradbery made her Grand Ole Opry debut on the historic stage of the Ryman Auditorium in Nashville on November 12. Along with her Opry debut, Bradbery was the supporting act on Brad Paisley's Beat This Summer Tour. On November 17, 2013, Bradbery sang the national anthem at the opening ceremonies of the 2013 Formula 1 United States Grand Prix. Her song "My Day" was featured in the Sochi 2014 Winter Olympics as she was chosen to be "the voice" of the Games' promotional campaign that partners NBC Olympics with The Voice.

Bradbery joined Hunter Hayes as a special guest on his We're Not Invisible Tour starting March 20, 2014.

=== 2015–2018: Singles and I Don't Believe We've Met ===
In an interview with Naked Mag published in February 2015, Bradbery said she was writing songs for her second album and was hoping to release it sometime that year. She announced on her Twitter account on August 23, 2015, that she would be releasing the first single from her second studio album "Friend Zone" on August 28, 2015. The song never had an official terrestrial radio release and was a "buzz" single.

In 2017, Bradbery finally released a song called "Sway" as a single. It debuted at No. 46 on the Billboard country chart the week on June 14 and it officially impacted country radio on August 28, 2017. She also shifted to Big Machine's BMLG imprint to accompany the release. On August 4, 2017, Bradbery announced that "Sway" would be the lead single off her upcoming second album, I Don't Believe We've Met, which was released on December 1, 2017. "Worth It" was the second single. Finally, "Goodbye Summer" was re-recorded as a music video with Thomas Rhett, with whom she released the single "Playing with Fire". She, Thomas Rhett, and Nick Jonas sang "Closer" at the CMA awards.

In 2018, she focused on recording covers for her fans, including "Psycho", "Slow Burn", and "God Is a Woman", as well as "Set Fire to the Rain" and others.

=== 2019–2022: In Between, The Collection ===
In 2019, she appeared on the Charlie's Angels: Original Motion Picture Soundtrack, contributing the song "Blackout". She released a music video with Parker McCollum, a cover of "Shallow", and recorded "Hometown" with Zac Brown of Zac Brown Band and Diplo for his first country album, Snake Oil (album). She also was featured on PUBLIC's song "Make You Mine".

In 2020, she released 3 songs during the COVID-19 pandemic, including "Never Have I Ever", based on her partner, "Girls In My Hometown", and a cover of Christmas song "O Holy Night".

In 2021, she recorded and released a version of her song "Never Have I Ever" titled "Never Have I Ever/Yo Nunca He... (Spanish Version)" with Mexican artist KURT. She filmed promo for her next single, also released in 2021 named "Stop Draggin' Your Boots" which became a certified RIAA Gold single in 2023. Additionally, she was featured on Parker McCollum's album Gold Chain Cowboy on the ballad named "Dallas".

In 2022, she released piano ballad "Break My Heart Again" about the ups and downs of relationships, and rounded out the year by releasing a collection of songs named In Between: The Collection, that she had made since 2019 with the intention of showing her journey as an artist and putting together these songs as closure before moving into a new project. The collection also included never-before released songs such as "Look at the Mess I'm In" and a cover of Robyn Ottolini's song "F-150". She also released live acoustic versions of both "Stop Draggin' Your Boots" and "Break My Heart Again".

=== 2023–present: Singles and Danielle ===
At the end of 2022, after talking about moving into a new era of music, Danielle released "A Special Place". Written by Maren Morris, Sasha Alex Sloan, Shane McAnally, and Jimmy Robbins, it is a spunky breakup song about a person you do not wish well.

In 2023 she announced and began her first headlining tour, the A Special Place Tour supporting her song "A Special Place". After performing her next singles on that tour, "Monster" was released on April 28, followed by Runaways on June 9 during the 50th CMA Fest and finally, "The Day That I'm Over You" on September 11. Additionally, she collaborated with Jordan Davis (singer) on song "Midnight Crisis" off of his album Bluebird Days.

In 2024, she released 3 songs in 7 weeks, possibly hinting at a new album. "Younger and Wiser" released on April 19, after being teased on Bradbery's social media pages. 3 weeks later, "Wedding or a Funeral" was released on May 10, hinting on social media that things did not end well in Bradbery's last relationship. 4 weeks later, Bradbery released "Broken Boy" on June 7. At a concert in Nashville, TN, Bradbery announced her third studio album, Danielle, her first independent release, on September 6, 2024.

== Artistry ==
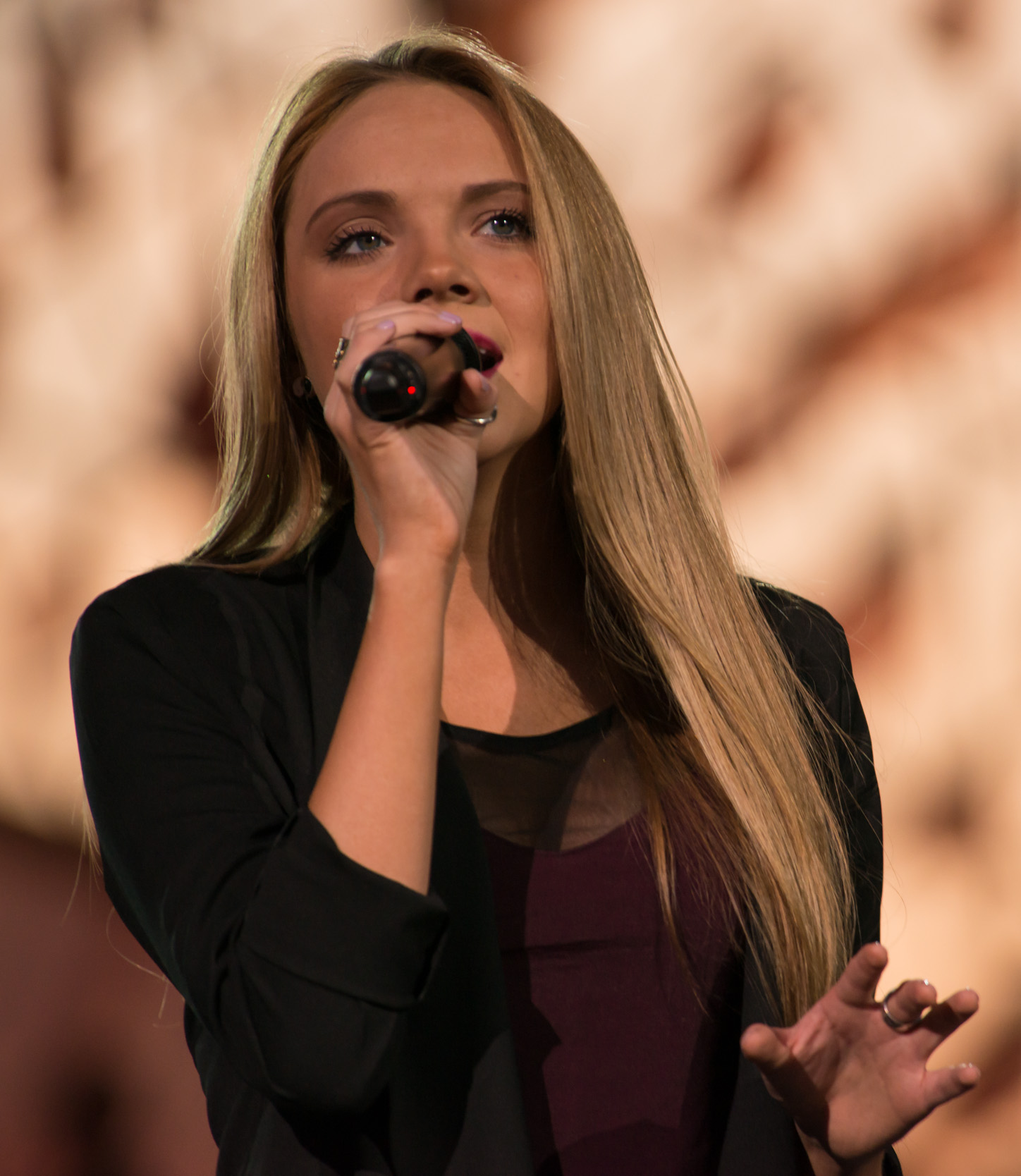
Bradbery in 2014

Bradbery cites Carrie Underwood, Taylor Swift, Miranda Lambert, and Martina McBride as her musical influences.

== Philanthropy ==
On October 12, 2013, Bradbery performed "Somewhere Over the Rainbow" at the Eighth Annual Tradition of Hope Gala to support MDA's Augie's Quest which has the sole purpose of finding a cure for ALS. She also performed at the Girls & Guitars charity concert to benefit the Ryan Seacrest Foundation. Bradbery and many other country stars signed a Honey Nut Cheerios box to be auctioned off for charity Outnumber Hunger. The charity's purpose is stop hunger in the U.S.

== Concert tours ==
Headlining

- 2023: A Special Place Tour

Supporting

- 2013: Beat This Summer Tour – Brad Paisley
- 2014: We're Not Invisible Tour – Hunter Hayes
- 2014: See You Tonight Tour – Scotty McCreery
- 2015: Platinum Tour – Miranda Lambert
- 2015: Suits & Boots Tour – Brett Eldredge & Thomas Rhett
- 2018: Life Changes Tour – Thomas Rhett
- 2019: Live Forever Tour – Kane Brown

== Discography ==
=== Studio albums ===
Title	Details	Peak chart positions			
Title	Details	US Country	US	iTunes US Pop Albums	iTunes Albums
Danielle Bradbery	Release date: November 25, 2013; Label: Big Machine Label Group; Formats: CD, music download	5	19		
I Don't Believe We've Met	Release date: December 1, 2017; Label: Big Machine Label Group; Formats: CD, music download	6	41		
In Between: The Collection	Release date: March 4, 2022; Label: Big Machine Label Group; Formats: Music download	—	—		
Danielle	Release date: September 6, 2024; Label: DB RECORDS; Formats: CD, Music download	-	—	9	26

=== Singles ===
Year	Title	Peak chart positions					Certifications	Album
Year	Title	US Country	US Country Airplay	US	CAN Country	CAN	Certifications	Album
2013	"The Heart of Dixie"	16	12	58	46	60	RIAA: Gold	Danielle Bradbery
2014	"Young in America"	—	49	—	—	—		Danielle Bradbery
2015	"Friend Zone"	41	—	—	—	—		Non-album single
2017	"Sway"	39	47	—	—	—	RIAA: Gold; MC: Gold	I Don't Believe We've Met
2018	"Worth It"	49	46	—	—	—	RIAA: Gold	I Don't Believe We've Met
2018	"Goodbye Summer" (featuring Thomas Rhett)	39	39	—	49	—		I Don't Believe We've Met
2020	"Never Have I Ever"	—	58	—	—	—		In Between: The Collection
2021	"Stop Draggin' Your Boots"	—	—	—	—	—	RIAA: Gold; MC: Gold	In Between: The Collection
2023	"A Special Place"	—	56	—	—	—		Non-album single
"—" denotes releases that did not chart

==== Promotional singles ====
Year	Single	Album
2017	"Human Diary"	I Don't Believe We've Met
2017	"Hello Summer"	I Don't Believe We've Met
2017	"Potential"	I Don't Believe We've Met
2019	"Shallow" (with Parker McCollum)	Non-album single
2020	"Girls in My Hometown"	In Between: The Collection
2022	"Break My Heart Again"	In Between: The Collection
2022	"Look at the Mess I'm In"	In Between: The Collection
2022	"Midnight Crisis" (with Jordan Davis)	Bluebird Days
2023	"Monster"	Non-album single
2023	"Runaways"	Non-album single

=== Music videos ===
Year	Title	Director	Ref.
2013	"The Heart of Dixie"	Shane Drake	
2014	"Young in America"	Shane Drake	
2015	"Friend Zone"	Roger Pistole/Eric Welch	
2017	"Sway"	Shaun Silva	
2017	"Human Diary"	—N/a	
2017	"Hello Summer"	Chris Hicky	
2017	"Potential"	—N/a	
2018	"Worth It"	Shaun Silva	
2018	"Goodbye Summer" (with Thomas Rhett)	Shaun Silva	
2019	"Shallow" (with Parker McCollum)	Shaun Silva	
2020	"Never Have I Ever"	Peter Zavadil	
2021	"Stop Draggin' Your Boots"		
2025	"Dent"		
2026	"Cowgirl's Prayer"		

=== Releases from The Voice ===
==== Albums ====
Title	Details	Peak chart positions			Sales
Title	Details	US Country	US	CAN	Sales
The Complete Season 4 Collection (The Voice Performance)	Release date: June 19, 2013; Label: Republic Records; Formats: Music download	6	19	30	US: 23,480

==== Singles ====
Year	Title	Peak chart positions			Sales
Year	Title	US Country	US	CAN	Sales
2013	"Maybe It Was Memphis"	25	92	90	US: 136,000
2013	"Wasted"	35	—	—	US: 30,000
2013	"Heads Carolina, Tails California"	23	91	98	US: 57,000
2013	"Grandpa (Tell Me 'Bout the Good Ol' Days)"	24	89	73	US: 63,000
2013	"A Little Bit Stronger"	31	108	—	US: 36,000
2013	"Shake the Sugar Tree"	38	—	—	US: 25,000
2013	"Who I Am"	22	78	66	US: 60,000
2013	"Please Remember Me"	30	91	86	US: 47,000
2013	"Born to Fly"	20	75	79	US: 68,000
2013	"Timber, I'm Falling in Love" (with Blake Shelton)	30	101	71	US: 44,000
"—" denotes releases that did not chart

=== Other appearances ===
Title	Year	Other artist(s)	Album
"Playing with Fire"	2016	Thomas Rhett	Tangled Up (Deluxe edition)
"Without You"	2018	Chris Lane	Laps Around the Sun
"Blackout"	2019	None	Charlie's Angels: Original Motion Picture Soundtrack and In Between: The Collection
"Hometown" (with Zac Brown)	2020	Diplo	Diplo Presents Thomas Wesley, Chapter 1: Snake Oil

== Awards and nominations ==
Year	Ceremony	Category	Nominated work	Result
2014	American Country Countdown Awards	Female Vocalist of the Year	Herself	Nominated
2017	CMT Music Awards	Performance of the Year	Close (with Nick Jonas and Thomas Rhett)	Nominated
2018	Academy of Country Music Awards	New Female Vocalist of the Year	Herself	Nominated
2018	CMT Music Awards	Breakthrough Video of the Year	Sway	Nominated
2018	CMT Music Awards	Performance of the Year	Stand Up for Something (with Andra Day, Common, Little Big Town, and Lee Ann Womack)	Nominated
2019	Academy of Country Music Awards	New Female Vocalist of the Year	Herself	Nominated
2021	Country Now Awards	Favorite Viral Song	Stop Draggin' Your Boots	Nominated

== Television appearances ==
Year	Title	Role	Notes
2013	The Voice	Herself/Artist	Season 4: Team Blake Shelton/Winner
2013	Hart of Dixie	Herself	Episode: "Miracles"
2017	Nashville	Herself	Episode: "Reasons to Quit"

== Notes ==
Awards and achievements
Preceded by Cassadee Pope	The Voice (American); Winner; 2013 (Spring)	Succeeded by Tessanne Chin
Preceded by "Cry"	The Voice (American); Winner's song "Born to Fly"; 2013 (Spring)	Succeeded by "Tumbling Down"
