= Possession (Melanie Martinez song) =

Single by Melanie Martinez

from the album Hades
- Released: January 28, 2026
- Genre: Pop; alt-pop; rock
- Length: 3:07
- Label: Atlantic
- Songwriters: Christopher J. Baran; Melanie Martinez
- Producer: CJ Baran

Melanie Martinez singles chronology
"Evil" (2023)	"Possession" (2026)	"Disney Princess" (2026)

Audio video
- "Possession" on YouTube

"Possession" (stylized in all caps) is a song by American singer-songwriter Melanie Martinez. It was co-written and produced by CJ Baran, and Atlantic Records released the song on January 28, 2026, as the first single from her fourth studio album, Hades (2026). After concluding the Trilogy Tour in support of her studio albums, Martinez started to tease her upcoming era in January 2026, clearing her social medias and her official website. The single was announced a day before, with an accompanying visual snippet.

== Background and release ==
Since May 2024, Martinez embarked on the Trilogy Tour in support of her studio albums, Cry Baby (2015), K–12 (2019), and Portals (2023). In January 2026, she cleared all of her social media accounts alongside her official website, to tease her upcoming era. Soon after, the singer uploaded a new video, which introduces a new character named Circle.

A day before the release of "Possession", Martinez announced that it would be released on January 28. The track was accompanied by its audio video as well as a snippet of the visual video. The song marks her first single since "Evil" (2023), which is featured on Portals.

== Music ==
A pop, alt-pop, and rock ballad, "Possession" runs for three minutes and eight seconds. Martinez sings in a near whisper, yet with gusto, about the experience of feeling like someone's "possession", while describing the role of a "good housewife". It "peels back the ways power can masquerade as love" and "spotlights Melanie's trademark blend of charm, mischief and bite". Lars Brandle from Billboard saw Martinez "tackl[ing] the ugly scenario of domestic violence", calling the song "an edgy number built on a bed of rock". Daily Times said the track depicts "her signature surreal visuals, sharp lyrics, and strong social commentary", while Flood Magazine's Will Schube referenced that it would not "sound out of place on a Spaghetti Western soundtrack", before she sings the lines such as "I hit my head real hard / I woke up in the dark". EIN Presswire stated that "Possession" is "haunting, satirical and spotlights Melanie's trademark blend of charm, mischief and bite".

== Reception ==
"Possession" reached number 1 on Billboard's This Week's Favorite New Music, gaining 80% of the vote behind Bruce Springsteen, Cannons, Noah Kahan and Labrinth. It also accumulated over 2.7 million Spotify streams in its first 24 hours and has exceeded 36 million streams to date, marking Martinez's fastest-streaming release and the largest female debut of 2026. Atwood magazine's Danielle Holian described it as a track that follows the conclusion of the Cry Baby trilogy with a sense of reckoning. She wrote that if Portals ended with "cosmic rebirth", "Possession" feels "like the reckoning that follows reincarnation". The editor also characterized it as a "candy-coated gut punch", noting its contrast between a "glossy" surface and "bruising underneath", and added that the song reintroduces Martinez "not as a character, but as an architect of power dynamics".

== Personnel ==
Credits were adapted from Tidal.

- Melanie Martinez – lead vocals, songwriter
- Nick Trapani – assistant engineer
- CJ Baran – producer, bass, engineer, keyboards, sequenced drums, sound desginer, synthesizer, songwriter
- Rhys Hastings – drums

== Charts ==
Weekly chart performance
Chart (2026)	Peak position
New Zealand Hot Singles (RMNZ)	15
US Bubbling Under Hot 100 (Billboard)	1
US Hot Rock & Alternative Songs (Billboard)	11

== Release history ==
List of release dates
Region	Date	Format	Label	Ref.
Various	January 28, 2026	Digital download; streaming	Atlantic	
