= Portals (Melanie Martinez album) =

Studio album by Melanie Martinez
- Released: March 31, 2023
- Recorded: 2020–2022
- Genre: Alternative pop; art pop; art rock; indie
- Length: 51:33
- Label: Atlantic
- Producer: CJ Baran; Melanie Martinez; One Love; Hoskins; The 23rd; Pearl Lion; Simon Says; Cautious Clay

Melanie Martinez chronology
After School (2020)	Portals (2023)	Hades (2026)

Singles from Portals
- 1. "Death" Released: March 17, 2023; 2. "Void" Released: March 29, 2023; 3. "Evil" Released: November 21, 2023

Portals (stylized in all caps) is the third studio album by American singer-songwriter Melanie Martinez. The album was released on March 31, 2023, through Atlantic Records. It is Martinez's first album after she (Note: Martinez uses she/her and they/them pronouns. This article uses she/her pronouns for consistency.) took her usual three-and-a-half-year hiatus from releasing music. After she returned from her hiatus, she rebranded her public persona of usual light pastel colors from her previous albums and EPs, adopting prosthetic makeup and elaborate costumes to resemble a fantasy creature with darker colors with themes of nature. In support of the album, Martinez embarked on the Portals Tour in May 2023.

The album had three singles: "Death", "Void", and "Evil"; the first two marked her first appearances on the chart, respectively reaching numbers 95 and 61 on the Billboard Hot 100. The album debuted at number two on the US Billboard 200 with first-week sales of 142,000 units, becoming her highest-charting album there. The project was set to be Martinez's third visual album, with seven music videos released; however, the idea was scrapped in favour of her upcoming fourth and fifth studio albums.

== Background and release ==
In 2019, Martinez released her second studio albums K–12 alongside a musical film of the same name. After a two-year hiatus from music, she started to archive all of her Instagram posts and began to tease her then upcoming album on February 18, 2023. Martinez also released a twelve-second snippet of a song on Spotify.

In February 2023, Martinez released a teaser video showing a mushroom in a foggy forest, with the phrase "RIP Crybaby" engraved in its stem, accompanied by a snippet of a new song. Several more teasers were subsequently posted, representing the "themes of rebirth, growing embryos, and eggs incubating in forests". One teaser showed Martinez "herself hatching from an egg as a pink fairy creature". (Nymph) Martinez's official website was also updated showcasing the album cover while merchandise for the album became available to the public for pre-order. The album's title was revealed through Martinez's official website. Portals was finally released on March 31, 2023, and consists of 13 songs, which are listed below.

== Promotion ==
=== Live performances ===
In the weeks leading up to the album's release, Martinez debuted several songs from the album in South America. She performed at all three South American Lollapalooza festivals, as well as Festival Estéreo Picnic and a solo headlining show in Santiago. She also embarked on the Portals Tour.

=== Singles ===
In March 2023, Martinez teased the lead single "Death" on Instagram, featuring a cryptic message and a photo showcasing a pink alien alter-ego "emerging from a prone human form". The song was released on March 17, 2023. The single was written and produced by Martinez, with CJ Baran co-producing. The song peaked at number 95 on the Billboard Hot 100, marking her first original song on the Billboard Hot 100. "Void" was released digitally as the second single from the album on March 29, 2023, and was sent to alternative radio in the United States on April 11, 2023. The song charted at number 61 on the Hot 100. "Evil" was released on November 21, 2023, as the album's third single. It charted at number seven on the Bubbling Under Hot 100 chart.

== Composition ==
Portals is primarily an alternative art pop and art rock album with elements of dark pop, experimental pop, synth-pop, grunge, indie and R&B. Throughout the album, Martinez displays "pop-rock songwriting, driving drum beats, and voice filters". The main theme of the album centers around the idea of a never-ending cycle of life and death and was described as "otherworldly and extraterrestrial". Martinez takes the form of her alter-ego Cry Baby (established from her previous albums Cry Baby and K-12) who is reborn as a "pink-skinned, four-eyed fairy creature that's stuck between Earth and the afterlife".

=== Songs ===
The album begins with "Death" which "reintroduced her newfound concept" for the album. The song begins with the phrase "Death is life is death is life" while heavy breathing and fast-paced footsteps are used at the beginning of the song. The song leads into "Void" which uses a softer "ethereal ambience" sound and works as a "story of being in the void [...] in between life and death" while Martinez also talks about her insecurities. This is followed by "Tunnel Vision" which has "layered eerie vocals" and transitions into a trip-hop outro that ends with Melanie's sigh "Show me how far obsession goes / Could've been more, now we'll never know". "Faerie Soirée" is an "intricate alt-pop ballad". This is similar to the next track, "Light Shower", where Martinez uses "simplified and stripped-down" sounds.

"Spider Web" has a xylophone melody and describes a social media addiction through "spider imagery and being caught in the web". The song seamlessly transitions into "Leeches" which was described as a "slimy and superficial" ballad. In "Battle of the Larynx", Martinez speaks out against male dominance against female psyche ["larynx" == "voice"]. The song was likened to that of rock music with a "fuzz-toned guitar riff and emphatic beat" and fades into ocean waves. "The Contortionist" has a traditional pop structure with an "array of orchestral elements, creating a pop symphony". "Moon Cycle" is a tragicomic and sketchy song about the menstrual cycle. The song is one of the least popular and streamed songs on ''PORTALS.'''

"Nymphology" is a pop song with a chaotic climax. In the song, Martinez compares nymphs in Greek mythology to "men, social media and the music industry" who put "femme-presenting people" into boxes and "use them for their own pleasure or gain and discarding them". This is followed by "Evil," which was called a stand-out on the album. The song sarcastically calls out an indecisive ex-partner refusing to reunite with the singer. The album ends with "Womb," which is a metaphor for Martinez's musical rebirth and loops back to the phrase "Life is death is life is death". The song also loops directly back into "Death" if played on repeat.

== Critical reception ==
Professional ratings
Review scores
Source	Rating
AllMusic	3.5/5 stars
Evening Standard	3/5 stars
The Line of Best Fit	6/10
Rolling Stone	4/5 stars

Rolling Stone writer Tomás Mier praised Martinez's use of a new alter-ego, noting that she used "that character to deliver her most introspective lyrics and sounds that move outside her sonic comfort zone". He called the album an "effortlessly inventive, mature record", saying that it "reintroduces her as an artist unafraid to start from scratch and tackle complex, difficult ideas". Brig Newspaper writer Emma Victoria Jenky called the album "undeniably authentic" and added that it is "exciting to see her grow her skills into production, and receiving credit for her genius ideas".

Emma Herold, writer for The Cavalier Daily, praised the album calling it a "statement of rebirth" for Martinez. She noted that while there are "recognizable elements of Martinez's sound like syncopation and classic rhyme", she also felt there was a good combination of new sounds including "synth pop and a more harsh, grungy and dark tone".

The Line of Best Fit writer Sam Franzini gave the album's lyrical content praise, comparing it to her older works, noting that the "themes are darker, and feel more real compared to her previous songs lacquered in metaphor". However, he felt that while her reinvention was "fantastical and imaginative", it failed to live up to her past work. Conversely, Evening Standard writer David Smyth gave the album three stars and criticised Martinez's lyrical content saying they were "comparatively lacking" and that "for the complete Martinez experience, the album isn't enough". He compared Martinez's new image to Björk, and so did Exclaim!, writing: "Björk can pull off this kind of thing because, well, she's Björk. The Voice alum [...], on the other hand, looks like an Annihilation extra who stumbled through a hedge."

=== Year-end lists ===
Critics' rankings for Portals
Publication	Accolade	Rank	Ref.
Exclaim!	Exclaim!'s 25 Worst Album Covers of 2023	10	
Rolling Stone	The 100 Best Albums of 2023	56	

== Commercial performance ==
Portals debuted at number two on the US Billboard 200 with 142,000 equivalent album units of which 99,000 were from pure album sales, making it her highest-charting album in the country. The album also reached the top of the US Top Alternative Albums chart. Internationally, the album reached number one in Australia and New Zealand, making it her first number-one album in both countries. It also reached number two in the United Kingdom, three in Canada, Ireland, Scotland, and top ten in Germany, Belgium, and Spain.

== Tour ==
Portals Tour
- Tour by Melanie Martinez
- Asia leg promotional poster
- Associated album: Portals
- Start date: May 30, 2023
- End date: February 6, 2024
- Legs: 3
- No. of shows: 54
- Supporting acts: Tanukichan; Upsahl; Sofia Isella

Melanie Martinez concert chronology
- K–12 Tour (2019–2020); Portals Tour (2023–2024); The Trilogy Tour (2024)

The Portals Tour is Martinez's fourth concert tour. The singer in support of her third studio album Portals announced the first leg, in North America, via her Instagram. Comprising thirty-one dates, the leg began on May 30, 2023, in Denver, Colorado, and concluded on July 15, 2023, in Montreal, Canada. In March 2023, two dates in Mexico were added, bringing the North American leg to a scheduled close on October 19. In June 2023, dates in Europe and Oceania were announced.

=== North American set list ===
The following set list is obtained from the Denver concert on May 30, 2023. It is not representative for all dates throughout the tour.

1. "Death"
2. "Void"
3. "Tunnel Vision"
4. "Faerie Soirée"
5. "Light Shower"
6. "Spider Web"
7. "Leeches"
8. "Battle of the Larynx"
9. "The Contortionist"
10. "Moon Cycle"
11. "Nymphology"
12. "Evil"
13. "Womb"

Encore

14. "Powder"
15. "Pluto"
16. "Milk of the Siren"

== Track listing ==
Standard edition
No.	Title	Writer(s)	Producer(s)	Length
1.	"Death"	Melanie Martinez	Martinez; CJ Baran	5:06
2.	"Void"	Martinez	Martinez	4:07
3.	"Tunnel Vision"	Martinez; Jeremy Dussolliet; Tim Sommers	Baran; One Love	4:44
4.	"Faerie Soirée"	Martinez; Jon Hoskins; Glen Garth; Phil Garth	Martinez; Baran; Hoskins; The 23rd	2:43
5.	"Light Shower"	Martinez	Martinez	4:27
6.	"Spider Web"	Martinez	Baran	3:03
7.	"Leeches"	Martinez; Simon Rosen	Baran; Simon Says	3:20
8.	"Battle of the Larynx"	Martinez	Baran	5:28
9.	"The Contortionist"	Martinez; Baran	Baran	3:20
10.	"Moon Cycle"	Martinez; Baran; Jared Scharff	Baran; Pearl Lion	2:32
11.	"Nymphology"	Martinez; Baran; Nick Long	Baran; Justin Greenwood^{[a]}	5:06
12.	"Evil"	Martinez; Baran	Baran	4:06
13.	"Womb"	Martinez; Omer Fedi	Baran	3:31
Total length:				51:33

Digital deluxe edition bonus tracks
No.	Title	Writer(s)	Producer(s)	Length
14.	"Powder"	Martinez; Baran	Baran	3:58
15.	"Pluto"	Martinez; Baran; Joshua Karpeh	Baran; Cautious Clay	3:01
16.	"Milk of the Siren"	Martinez; Dussolliet; Sommers	One Love	4:25
Total length:				62:57

Notes

- ^{^[a]} signifies an additional producer
- "Nymphology" contains the hidden interlude "Amulet", starting at 3:58.
- "Faerie Soirée" contains the hidden interlude "Venus", starting at 1:45

== Personnel ==
Musicians

- Melanie Martinez – vocals (all tracks shown on setlist); programming (tracks 1, 2, 4, 5)
- CJ Baran – programming, synthesizer (tracks 1, 3, 7–12); guitar (tracks 1, 8, 11, 12)
- Rhys Hastings – drums (tracks 1, 2, 8, 10, 13)
- Martin Kutnar – cello (tracks 1, 7, 9, 11)
- Matej Mihaljević – violin (tracks 1, 7, 9, 11)
- One Love – programming, synthesizer (track 3)
- Pearl Lion – guitar (track 10)
- Nick Long – guitar (track 11)
- Ilan Rubin – drums (track 12)

Technical

- Emerson Mancini – mastering
- Mitch McCarthy – mixing
- CJ Baran – engineering
- Michael Keenan – engineering

== Charts ==
=== Weekly charts ===
Weekly chart performance for Portals
Chart (2023–2024)	Peak position
Australian Albums (ARIA)	1
Austrian Albums (Ö3 Austria)	11
Belgian Albums (Ultratop Flanders)	14
Belgian Albums (Ultratop Wallonia)	15
Canadian Albums (Billboard)	3
Croatian International Albums (HDU)	4
Dutch Albums (Album Top 100)	8
Finnish Albums (Suomen virallinen lista)	16
French Albums (SNEP)	30
German Albums (Offizielle Top 100)	4
Greek Albums (IFPI)	56
Hungarian Albums (MAHASZ)	11
Icelandic Albums (Tónlistinn)	20
Irish Albums (Official Charts)	3
Italian Albums (FIMI)	20
Lithuanian Albums (AGATA)	7
New Zealand Albums (RMNZ)	1
Norwegian Albums (VG-lista)	22
Polish Albums (ZPAV)	9
Portuguese Albums (AFP)	4
Scottish Albums (Official Charts)	3
Spanish Albums (Promusicae)	8
Swedish Albums (Sverigetopplistan)	28
Swiss Albums (Schweizer Hitparade)	23
UK Albums (Official Charts)	2
US Billboard 200	2
US Top Alternative Albums (Billboard)	1
US Top Rock & Alternative Albums (Billboard)	1
US Indie Store Album Sales (Billboard)	1

=== Year-end charts ===
Year-end chart performance for Portals
Chart (2023)	Position
US Billboard 200	112
US Top Rock & Alternative Albums (Billboard)	21

== Certifications ==
Certifications for Portals
Region	Certification	Certified units/sales
United Kingdom (BPI)	Gold	100,000^{‡}
^{‡} Sales+streaming figures based on certification alone.

== Release history ==
Release dates and formats for Portals
Region	Date	Format(s)	Edition	Label	Ref.
Various (Note: Digital copies are available worldwide, with the exception of Belarus, Russia and Ukraine.)	March 31, 2023	CD; digital download; LP; streaming	Standard	Atlantic	
Various	April 5, 2023	Digital download; streaming	Deluxe	Atlantic	
