= Disney Princess (song) =

Single by Melanie Martinez

from the album Hades
- Released: February 25, 2026
- Genre: Alt-pop
- Length: 4:05
- Label: Atlantic
- Songwriters: Christopher J. Baran; Melanie Martinez
- Producer: CJ Baran

Melanie Martinez singles chronology
| "Possession" (2026) | "Disney Princess" (2026) | "Uncanny Valley" (2026) |

Audio video
- "Disney Princess" on YouTube

"Disney Princess" (stylized in all caps) is a song by American singer-songwriter Melanie Martinez, released on February 25, 2026, as the second single from her fourth studio album, Hades (2026). It was written by Martinez and CJ Baran, and produced by the latter.

== Background and composition ==
I love writing about the entertainment industry and how it affects women. It's a perfect microcosm of the world around us, how numb and disconnected you can become if you allow others to commodify you.

— Melanie Martinez, in a press release

On February 23, 2026, Martinez first teased "Disney Princess" by revealing that it would be released on February 25 (7pm ET), revealing part of the song's lyric: "I've signed the dotted line and I've fucked every devil". The track is the second single from her fourth studio album, Hades (2026).

According to Christopher Gona of V13, "Disney Princess" critiques society's commodification of women and presents the idea of "selling [one's] soul" as something "far more insidious". Stereoboard's Jon Stickler noted that following the single "Possession", the track continues in a darker vein, describing it as a satirical alt-pop track that critiques the commodification of women in society.

== Critical reception ==
Eric Alper from That Eric Alper described "Disney Princess" as a "sardonic" and "commanding" track. Writing for Euphoria, Nmesoma Okechukwu noted that the song quickly became a fan favorite and was praised for prompting discussions about issues affecting women that are often overlooked. Although no accompanying music video had been released at the time of the review, she speculated that a visual treatment could prove "mind-blowing".

== Personnel ==
Credits were adapted from Tidal.

- Melanie Martinez – lead vocals, songwriter
- CJ Baran – producer, songwriter, bass, drum programmer, engineer, guitar, keyboards, sound desginer, synthesizer programming
- Nick Trapani – assistant editor, assistant engineer
- Rhys Hastings – drums

== Charts ==
Weekly chart performance
| Chart (2026) | Peak position |
|---|---|
| US Hot Rock & Alternative Songs (Billboard) | 39 |

== Release history ==
List of release dates
| Region | Date | Format | Label | Ref. |
|---|---|---|---|---|
| Various | February 25, 2026 | Digital download; streaming | Atlantic | |
