= Zión Moreno =

American actress

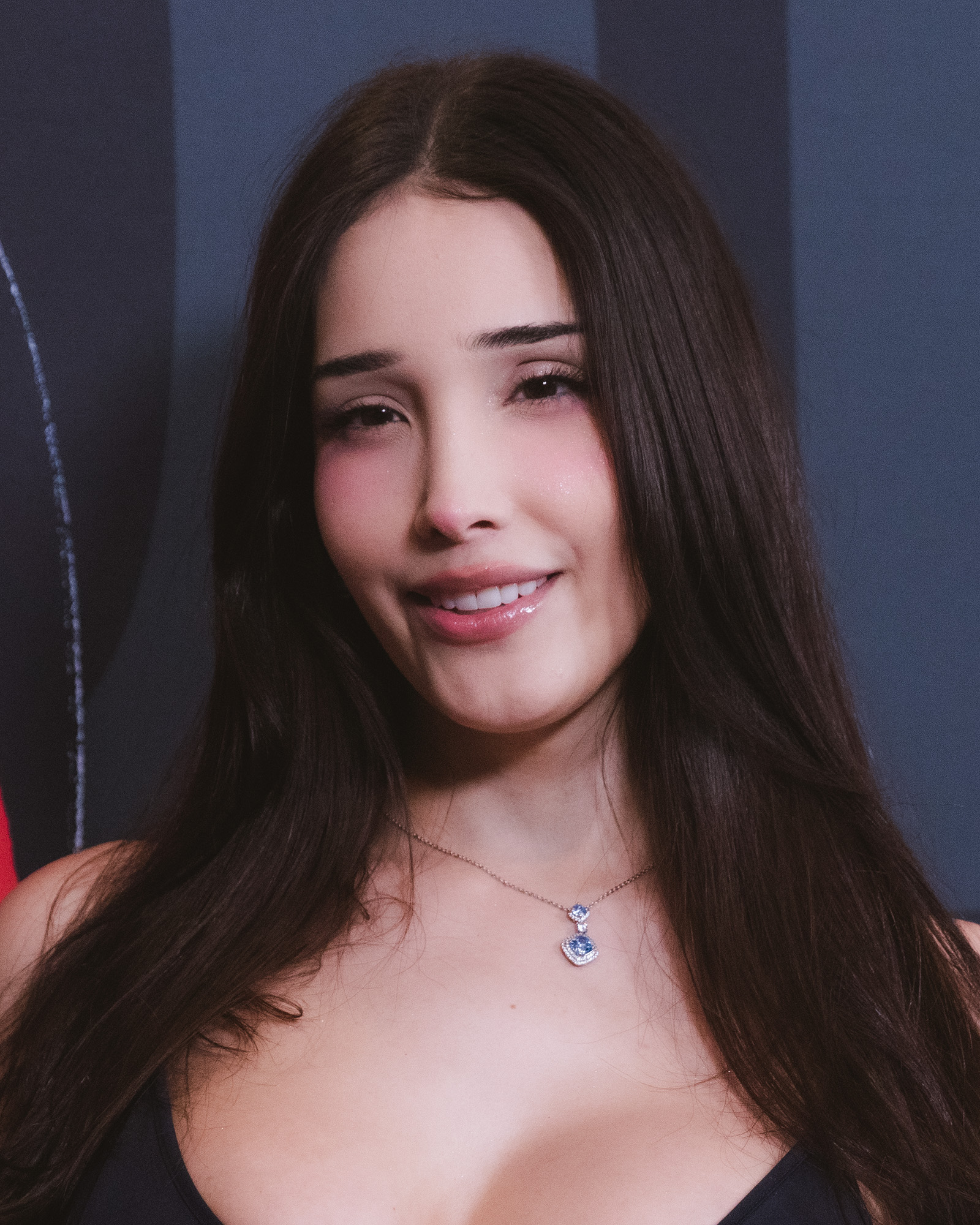
- Moreno in 2026
- Born: February 23, 1995 (age 31); El Paso, Texas, U.S.
- Occupation: Actress
- Years active: 2015−present

Zión Moreno (born February 23, 1995) is an American actress. On television, she is known for her roles in the Netflix series Control Z (2020) and the HBO Max reboot of Gossip Girl (2021–2023). Her films include K-12 (2019).

== Early life ==
Moreno was born in El Paso, Texas. She grew up in Albuquerque, New Mexico, and spoke Spanish at home. Moreno has two siblings: a sister and a brother. Her father is from Nuevo Leon, Mexico while her mother is from Chihuahua, Mexico.

Moreno is a trans woman and transitioned at the age of 13. During her time in school, she faced bullying from her peers.

Moreno briefly attended the University of New Mexico with a full-ride scholarship, and studied in a creative writing and journalism program. She originally planned to become a writer and do investigative reporting.

== Career ==
Moreno moved to New York City at 19 to pursue a career as a model. She was scouted by Wilhelmina Models, Elite Model Management, and Slay Model Management. She initially found modeling challenging, but grew to appreciate the craft more after shifting her focus towards acting.

She presented the Diversify TV Awards at the 2017 MIPCOM in Cannes.

Moreno made her on screen debut as Fleur in the 2019 surrealist jukebox musical film K-12, written and directed by singer Melanie Martinez. In 2020, she starred as Isabela de la Fuente in the Mexican Netflix teen drama Control Z. In March 2020, it was announced she had been cast as Luna La in the HBO Max series Gossip Girl, a soft reboot of the original series that premiered on July 8, 2021.

== Personal life ==
Moreno is divorced; she was previously married to a musician.

== Filmography ==
Year	Title	Role	Notes
2019	K-12	Fleur	
2020	Control Z	Isabela de la Fuente	Main character, 8 episodes (season 1)
2021–2023	Gossip Girl	Luna de la Cruz "Luna La"	Main character
2021–2022	Claws	Selena	4 episodes
2024	Prom Dates	Heather	Hulu film
2026	Corporate Retreat	Amber	Main character
TBA	Find Your Friends	TBA	Post-production
