= The Bakery (song) =

2020 single by Melanie Martinez

Single by Melanie Martinez

from the EP After School
- Released: September 25, 2020
- Genre: R&B; funk
- Length: 2:35
- Label: Atlantic
- Songwriters: Melanie Martinez; Blake Slatkin
- Producer: Slatkin

Melanie Martinez singles chronology
"Fire Drill" (2020)	"The Bakery" (2020)	"Death" (2023)

Music video
- "The Bakery" on YouTube

"The Bakery" is a song by American singer-songwriter Melanie Martinez from her fourth extended play (EP), After School (2020)—the deluxe edition of her second studio album, K-12 (2019). It was released as the lead single from After School on September 25, 2020. It was written by Martinez and its producer Slatkin. The song was accompanied by a music video.

== Background ==
On July 25, 2020, Martinez revealed during an interview with Brazilian channel "Multishow" that the track was produced by Blake Slatkin. On September 22, 2020, Martinez posted a snippet of the song on TikTok, announcing that it would be released on September 25. On September 25, 2020, Martinez posted a snippet of the music video on her Instagram, announcing that the video, alongside the rest of the deluxe would be released at 12:00AM EST. A photo from the music video was also revealed in an Instagram story.

== Theme ==
"The Bakery" is a song about Martinez unenthusiastically working at a bakery during high school because the singer needed to make money to invest into art and music.

== Charts ==
Chart (2020)	Peak position
Alternative Streaming Songs (Billboard)	23
New Zealand Hot Singles (RMNZ)	23

== Release history ==
Region	Date	Format	Label	Ref.
Various	September 25, 2020	Digital download	Atlantic	
