= K–12 Tour =

2019–20 concert tour by Melanie Martinez

- World tour by Melanie Martinez
- Associated album: K-12
- Start date: October 13, 2019
- End date: February 17, 2020
- Legs: 2
- No. of shows: 19 in North America; 29 in Europe; 48 in total
- Supporting acts: Lauren Ruth Ward (North America); Naaz (Europe)

Melanie Martinez concert chronology
- Cry Baby Tour (2015–2016); K-12 Tour (2019–2020); Portals Tour (2023–2024)

The K–12 Tour was the third concert tour by American singer-songwriter Melanie Martinez, in support of her (Note: Martinez uses she/her and they/them pronouns. This article uses she/her pronouns for consistency.) second studio album K–12. Comprising 48 shows, the tour began on October 13, 2019, in Washington, D.C., and concluded prematurely on February 17, 2020, in Brixton, England, due to the COVID-19 pandemic. Category:Concert tours cancelled due to the COVID-19 pandemic

== Background ==
The tour was officially announced on July 29, 2019. On the same day, the dates for the shows in Northern America were also announced. The dates for the shows in Europe were announced 2 months later, on September 20, 2019. More dates for Northern American shows were announced on February 11, 2020. It would conclude prematurely on February 17, 2020, in Brixton, England, due to the COVID-19 pandemic.

== Concert synopsis ==
Martinez wore "soft, pastel-colored" costumes while dancers were "clad in baby-like clothing and slicked back hair". During "Show & Tell", Martinez "sang inside a rococo, heart-shaped box, arms shackled like a puppet". For "Nurse's Office", she was "strapped to an ornate hospital bed, being wheeled around by ominous school nurses". During "Drama Club", she danced and ironed clothes in a Venetian style drawing-room. During "Strawberry Shortcake", she performed "10ft in the air, atop a giant skirt, while the venue was gradually perfumed with the scent of strawberries". The show closed with a performance of "Fire Drill" while the screen showed an image of a notebook with the words After School written on it.

== Critical reception ==
Gemma Samways of the Evening Standard rated the tour 3 out of 5 stars. She praised the "undeniably spectacular" visuals but criticized "lengthy breaks between songs for sets and props to be rearranged". She concluded that "not as slick as pure musical theatre, but lacking the euphoric energy of a pop concert, it was a performance destined to disappoint fans of either discipline."

Melanie Smith of Louder Than War called it a "unique and inventive musical spectacle". She added that Martinez "successfully brought her film to life on the stage".

== Set list ==
1. "Wheels on the Bus"
2. "Class Fight"
3. "The Principal"
4. "Show & Tell"
5. "Nurse's Office"
6. "Drama Club"
7. "Strawberry Shortcake"
8. "Lunchbox Friends"
9. "Orange Juice"
10. "Detention"
11. "Teacher's Pet"
12. "High School Sweethearts"
13. "Recess"

Encore

14. "Copy Cat"
15. "Sippy Cup"
16. "Alphabet Boy"
17. "Mad Hatter"
18. "Fire Drill"

Notes

- On select shows in Europe, "Sippy Cup" was cut from the setlist.
- "Copy Cat" was performed during shows in Frankfurt, Paris, Tilburg and London.

== Shows ==
List of concerts showing date, city, country, and venue
Date	City	Country	Venue
Leg 1 – North America
October 13, 2019	Washington, D.C.	United States	Union Market
October 15, 2019	Atlanta	United States	Coca-Cola Roxy
October 16, 2019	Orlando	United States	House of Blues
October 18, 2019	Charlotte	United States	The Fillmore
October 19, 2019	Richmond	United States	The National
October 20, 2019	Boston	United States	Orpheum Theatre
October 22, 2019	Toronto	Canada	Rebel
October 23, 2019	Detroit	United States	The Fillmore
October 25, 2019	Chicago	United States	Riviera Theatre
October 26, 2019	Columbus	United States	Express Live!
October 29, 2019	New York City	United States	Hammerstein Ballroom
October 30, 2019	Philadelphia	United States	The Fillmore
November 1, 2019	Indianapolis	United States	Old National Centre
November 2, 2019	Milwaukee	United States	The Rave/Eagles Club
November 3, 2019	St. Louis	United States	The Pageant
November 5, 2019	Houston	United States	Revention Music Center
November 6, 2019	Irving	United States	Toyota Music Factory
November 8, 2019	Phoenix	United States	The Van Buren
November 9, 2019	Los Angeles	United States	Hollywood Palladium
Leg 2 – Europe
December 2, 2019	Dublin	Ireland	Olympia Theatre
December 4, 2019	Glasgow	Scotland	O2 Academy Glasgow
December 5, 2019	Manchester	England	O2 Apollo
December 6, 2019	Newcastle	England	Newcastle City Hall
December 8, 2019	Birmingham	England	O2 Academy Birmingham
December 9, 2019	London	England	O2 Shepherd's Bush Empire
December 11, 2019	Portsmouth	England	Portsmouth Guildhall
December 12, 2019	Leeds	England	O2 Academy Leeds
December 16, 2019	Amsterdam	Netherlands	Melkweg
December 17, 2019	Hamburg	Germany	Docks
January 21, 2020	Lisbon	Portugal	Campo Pequeno
January 22, 2020	Madrid	Spain	WiZink Center
January 24, 2020	Padua	Italy	Gran Teatro Geox
January 25, 2020	Milan	Italy	Social Music City
January 27, 2020	Zürich	Switzerland	Halle 622
January 29, 2020	Munich	Germany	Tonhalle - kultfabrik
January 30, 2020	Vienna	Austria	Gasometer
January 31, 2020	Warsaw	Poland	EXPO XXI
February 2, 2020	Berlin	Germany	Collumbiahalle
February 3, 2020	Prague	Czechia	Forum Karlin Hall
February 5, 2020	Copenhagen	Denmark	K.B. Hallen
February 6, 2020	Oslo	Norway	Sentrum Scene
February 7, 2020	Stockholm	Sweden	Annexet
February 9, 2020	Brussels	Belgium	Ancienne Belgique
February 10, 2020	Frankfurt	Germany	Jahrhunderthalle
February 12, 2020	Cologne	Germany	Palladium
February 13, 2020	Paris	France	L'Olympia
February 15, 2020	Tilburg	Netherlands	Popodium 013
February 17, 2020	Brixton	England	O2 Brixton Academy

== Cancelled dates ==
List of cancelled concerts, showing date, city, country, venue, reason for cancellation and reference
Date	City	Country	Venue	Reason
March 17, 2020 (Note: The March 17, 2020 show in Anaheim was originally set for November 10, 2019, but was rescheduled due to illness.)	Anaheim	United States	House of Blues	COVID-19 pandemic
March 19, 2020 (Note: The March 19, 2020 show in Oakland was originally set for November 13, 2019, but was rescheduled due to illness.)	Oakland	United States	Fox Oakland Theater	COVID-19 pandemic
March 20, 2020 (Note: The March 20, 2020 show in Las Vegas was originally set for November 15, 2019, but was rescheduled due to illness.)	Paradise	United States	Pearl Concert Theater	COVID-19 pandemic
March 22, 2020 (Note: The March 22, 2020 show in Denver was originally set for November 17, 2019, but was rescheduled due to illness.)	Denver	United States	Paramount Theater	COVID-19 pandemic
March 23, 2020 (Note: The March 23, 2020 show in Salt Lake City was originally set for November 16, 2019, but was rescheduled due to illness.)	Salt Lake City	United States	The Union	COVID-19 pandemic
March 25, 2020 (Note: The March 25, 2020 show in Seattle was originally set for November 20, 2019, but was rescheduled due to illness.)	Seattle	United States	Paramount Theatre	COVID-19 pandemic
March 26, 2020 (Note: The March 26, 2020 show in Boise was originally for November 19, 2019, but was rescheduled due to illness.)	Garden City	United States	Revolution Concert House	COVID-19 pandemic
June 3, 2020	Minneapolis	United States	Minneapolis Armory	COVID-19 pandemic
June 5, 2020 (Note: The June 5, 2020 show in Cincinnati is part of Bunbury Music Festival.)	Cincinnati	United States	Yeatman's Cove	COVID-19 pandemic
June 6, 2020	Sterling Heights	United States	Michigan Lottery Amphitheatre at Freedom Hill	COVID-19 pandemic
June 7, 2020	Columbus	United States	Express Live!	COVID-19 pandemic
June 9, 2020	Chicago	United States	Huntington Bank Pavilion	COVID-19 pandemic
June 10, 2020	Maryland Heights	United States	St. Louis Music Park	COVID-19 pandemic
June 12, 2020	Cleveland	United States	Jacobs Pavilion	COVID-19 pandemic
June 13, 2020	Toronto	Canada	RBC Echo Beach	COVID-19 pandemic
June 14, 2020	Montreal	Canada	M Telus	COVID-19 pandemic
June 16, 2020	Washington, D.C.	United States	The Anthem	COVID-19 pandemic
June 17, 2020	Pittsburgh	United States	UPMC Events Center	COVID-19 pandemic
June 19, 2020	Boston	United States	Leader Bank Pavilion	COVID-19 pandemic
June 20, 2020	Philadelphia	United States	The Met Philadelphia	COVID-19 pandemic
June 21, 2020	Asbury Park	United States	Stone Pony Summer Stage	COVID-19 pandemic
June 23, 2020	Wallingford	United States	Toyota Oakdale Theatre	COVID-19 pandemic
June 24, 2020	New York City	United States	Radio City Music Hall	COVID-19 pandemic
June 26, 2020	Raleigh	United States	Red Hat Amphitheater	COVID-19 pandemic
June 27, 2020	Charlotte	United States	Charlotte Metro Credit Union Amphitheatre	COVID-19 pandemic
June 28, 2020	Nashville	United States	Nashville Municipal Auditorium	COVID-19 pandemic
June 30, 2020	Jacksonville	United States	Daily's Place	COVID-19 pandemic
July 1, 2020	Miami	United States	Bayfront Park	COVID-19 pandemic
July 2, 2020	Tampa	United States	Yuengling Center	COVID-19 pandemic
July 7, 2020	Independence	United States	Cable Dahmer Arena	COVID-19 pandemic
July 8, 2020	Rogers	United States	Walmart Arkansas Music Pavilion	COVID-19 pandemic
July 9, 2020	Irving	United States	Toyota Music Factory	COVID-19 pandemic
July 11, 2020	Sugar Land	United States	Smart Financial Centre	COVID-19 pandemic
July 12, 2020	Austin	United States	Moody Theater	COVID-19 pandemic
July 14, 2020	Phoenix	United States	Arizona Federal Theatre	COVID-19 pandemic
July 15, 2020	Fresno	United States	William Saroyan Theatre	COVID-19 pandemic
July 17, 2020	Los Angeles	United States	Greek Theatre	COVID-19 pandemic
July 18, 2020	San Diego	United States	CalCoast Credit Union Open Air Theatre	COVID-19 pandemic
July 19, 2020	Berkeley	United States	Greek Theatre Berkeley	COVID-19 pandemic
July 21, 2020	Portland	United States	Theater of the Clouds	COVID-19 pandemic
July 22, 2020	Vancouver	Canada	Orpheum Theatre	COVID-19 pandemic
July 23, 2020	Redmond	United States	Marymoor Park	COVID-19 pandemic
July 25, 2020	Sandy	United States	Sandy City Amphitheater	COVID-19 pandemic
July 26, 2020	Denver	United States	Fillmore Auditorium	COVID-19 pandemic
July 28, 2020	Garden City	United States	Revolution Concert House	COVID-19 pandemic
July 30, 2020	Paradise	United States	Pearl Concert Theater	COVID-19 pandemic
