= Prom Dates =

2024 film by Kim O Nguyen

- Release poster
- Directed by: Kim O. Nguyen
- Written by: D.J. Mausner
- Produced by: Molle DeBartolo; Mickey Liddell; Pete Shilaimon; Kevin Hart; Bryan Smiley; Luke Kelly-Clyne; Jeremy Garelick; Will Phelps
- Starring: Julia Lester; Antonia Gentry; Kenny Ridwan; JT Neal; Jordan Buhat; Zión Moreno; John Michael Higgins; Chelsea Handler
- Cinematography: Bradford Lipson
- Edited by: Daniel Reitzenstein
- Music by: Matthew Compton
- Production companies: LD Entertainment; Hartbeat Productions; American High
- Distributed by: Hulu
- Release date: May 3, 2024
- Running time: 86 minutes
- Country: United States
- Language: English

Prom Dates is a 2024 American coming-of-age comedy film directed by Kim O. Nguyen, written by D.J. Mausner, and starring Julia Lester and Antonia Gentry.

Prom Dates was released on Hulu on May 3, 2024.

== Premise ==
Adolescent friends Hannah and Jess make a pact to have the best prom ever when they grow up. Now high school seniors, they break up with their dates just before the prom and go in search of replacement dates. While Jess wants to become prom queen, Hannah finally finds the courage to come out as lesbian and wants to find another lesbian to go to the prom with.

== Cast ==
- Julia Lester as Hannah
  - Millie Thorpe as young Hannah
- Antonia Gentry as Jess
  - Hailey Philip as young Jess
- Kenny Ridwan as Greg
- JT Neal as Jacob
- Jordan Buhat as Luca
- Zión Moreno as Heather
- Terry Hu as Angie
- Emery Kelly as Reggie
- John Michael Higgins as Principal Lundy
- Chelsea Handler as Barb
- Shea Buckner as a cop

== Production ==
American High, Hartbeat Productions, and LD Entertainment produced the film. Prom Dates began production in Syracuse, New York in 2023.

== Release ==
In November 2023, Hulu bought the right to distribute the film. It was released on May 3, 2024.

== Reception ==
On the review aggregator website Rotten Tomatoes, 39% of 18 critics' reviews are positive, with an average rating of 4.7/10.
