= Piggyback (song) =

Single by Melanie Martinez
- Released: December 22, 2017
- Recorded: 2017
- Length: 3:27
- Label: Self-released
- Songwriter: Melanie Martinez
- Producer: Michael Keenan

Melanie Martinez singles chronology
"Gingerbread Man" (2016)	"Piggyback" (2017)	"Copy Cat" (2020)

"Piggyback" is a song by American singer-songwriter Melanie Martinez. It was self-released for streaming through her (Note: Martinez uses she/her and they/them pronouns. This article uses she/her pronouns for consistency.) SoundCloud account on December 22, 2017, following a controversy between Martinez and American singer-songwriter Timothy Heller.

== Background and release ==
In December 2017, American singer-songwriter Timothy Heller accused Melanie Martinez via Twitter of sexually assaulting and raping her. In response to Heller's accusations, Martinez had tweeted that the allegations were "horrific and saddening", and stated that Heller "never said no to what they chose to do together", insinuating consent. The singer subsequently released a second statement, thanking her fans for pointing out Heller's "false statements" and that she would "never be intimate with someone without their absolute consent." In less than 20 days after the incident, Martinez wrote and recorded "Piggyback". She independently released the song for streaming as a single on her SoundCloud account on December 22, 2017.

== Composition ==
"Piggyback"
A 24-second sample of the refrain of "Piggyback"

"Piggyback" is 3 minutes and 27 seconds long. Martinez had wrote the song alongside its engineer and producer Michael Keenan. The lyrics feature Martinez "calling out 'fake people' in her life", and responding to the rape allegations through the lyrics: "You're lying your way to try and gain a piece of me" / "Now you're trying to kill my name for some fame." It also centers around Martinez's "struggles with friendships ending in jealousy due to her fame and fortune".

== Release history ==
Release history
Region	Date	Format	Label	Ref.
Various	December 22, 2017	Digital download; streaming	Self-released	
