= Death (Melanie Martinez song) =

Single by Melanie Martinez

from the album Portals
- Released: March 17, 2023
- Length: 5:07 (album version); 3:40 (radio edit)
- Label: Atlantic
- Songwriter: Melanie Adele Martinez
- Producers: Melanie Adele Martinez; Christopher John Baran

Melanie Martinez singles chronology
"The Bakery" (2020)	"Death" (2023)	"Void" (2023)

Music video
- "Death" on YouTube

"Death" is a song by American singer-songwriter Melanie Martinez. It was released on March 17, 2023, through Atlantic Records as the lead single from her (Note: Martinez uses she/her and they/them pronouns. This article uses she/her pronouns for consistency.) third studio album, Portals. It became her first song to chart on the US Billboard Hot 100 since 2012, peaking at number 95.

== Background ==
In March 2023, Martinez uploaded a post to Instagram featuring a cryptic message and a photo showcasing the alter-ego pink fairy or nymph character "emerging from a prone human form". The post also showed a set of lyrics, a release date, and the title of the lead single. The song was later released on March 17, 2023.

== Music video ==
The video begins with five masked dancers glancing into Cry Baby’s grave, where they place plants. Cry Baby is in the grave with an open wound on her heart. A version of Martinez with pink skin, multiple eyes, and fairy-like wings then appears from Cry Baby's heart and elevates to the surface. Throughout the video, the camera cuts to the dancers on an island with Cry Baby's grave, and this version of Martinez with blue hair singing or on a hoop performing tricks with dancers, still elevating. She then stabs Cry Baby's corpse with nine swords. Near the end, the elevating Martinez rips a cord connecting her alter-ego, Cry Baby, trying to escape the grave. As the dancers finish burying Cry Baby, Martinez pops out of the ground and the video ends.

== Personnel ==
=== Musicians ===
- Melanie Adele Martinez – vocals

=== Production ===
- Melanie Martinez – producer
- Christopher John Baran – producer

== Charts ==
=== Weekly charts ===
Weekly chart performance for "Death"
Chart (2023)	Peak position
Australia Hitseekers (ARIA)	12
Global 200 (Billboard)	161
Ireland (IRMA)	66
New Zealand Hot Singles (RMNZ)	7
UK Singles (OCC)	67
US Billboard Hot 100	95
US Hot Rock & Alternative Songs (Billboard)	9

=== Year-end charts ===
Year-end chart performance for "Death"
Chart (2023)	Position
US Hot Rock & Alternative Songs (Billboard)	94

== Release history ==
Release dates and formats for "Death"
Region	Date	Format(s)	Label	Ref.
Various	March 17, 2023	Digital download; streaming	Atlantic	
