= Corporate Retreat =

2026 film by Aaron Fisher

- Theatrical release poster
- Directed by: Aaron Fisher
- Written by: Aaron Fisher; Kerri Lee Romeo
- Produced by: Uri Singer
- Starring: Odeya Rush; Zion Moreno; Ashton Sanders; Alan Ruck; Rosanna Arquette; Kirby Johnson
- Cinematography: Josh Fisher
- Edited by: Claudia Castello
- Music by: Anna Drubich
- Production company: Passage Pictures
- Distributed by: Western Film Service
- Release dates: April 5, 2026 (BIFFF); May 22, 2026 (United States)
- Running time: 90 minutes
- Country: United States
- Language: English
- Box office: $381,815

Corporate Retreat is a 2026 American horror-dark comedy directed by Aaron Fisher and written by Fisher and Kerri Lee Romeo. It stars Odeya Rush, Sasha Lane, Ashton Sanders, Alan Ruck, Kirby Johnson and Rosanna Arquette.

== Plot ==
A group of ambitious young executives embark on a luxury team-building escape, only to be drawn into a brutal, blood-soaked fight for survival.

== Cast ==
- Odeya Rush as Ginger Hayes
- Elias Kacavas as Cliff St. Clair, general counsel and Ginger's boyfriend who invites her on a corporate retreat
- Ashton Sanders as Carl Thomas, financial officer
- Tyler Alvarez as Omar Rodriguez, chief technology officer
- Kirby Johnson as Billie Hoffman, chief Human Resources officer
- Ellen Toland as Aubrey Johnson, chief operating officer
- Benjamin Norris as Devin Hill, chief executive officer
- Rosanna Arquette as Deborah O'Hara, chief revenue officer
- Alan Ruck as Arthur Scott, the company founder
- Sasha Lane as Lola Price, an experience guide at the retreat
- Zión Moreno as Amber Garcia, an experience guide at the retreat
- Omar Sharif Jr. as Ken

== Production ==
In March 2025, it was reported that a horror-thriller film co-written and directed by Aaron Fisher was in pre-production, with Lilly Krug in the lead role. In April, Rosanna Arquette, Ashton Sanders, and Simona Tabasco joined the cast. In May, Odeya Rush, Alan Ruck, and Sasha Lane joined the cast, with principal photography beginning in June 2025.

== Release ==
Corporate Retreat premiered at the Brussels International Fantastic Film Festival on April 5, 2026. It had its LATAM premiere at the Fanataspoa Fantastic Film Festival in April. The movie was released on 512 screens in North America, primarily in the United States, on May 22, 2026.. The movie will be released on VOD in the United States and Canada on July 10, 2026, with rental and purchase transaction on demand availability on platforms including Prime Video, Apple TV, Fandango (streaming service) and Google Play.

== Reception ==
On the review aggregator website Rotten Tomatoes, 28% of 18 critics' reviews are positive, with an average rating of 3.7/10. The audience Popcornmeter is 51%.

Critical reception has been polarized. While several critics strongly criticized the screenplay and satire, others praised the film's practical effects, extreme gore, and unconventional tone

Simon Abrams of RogerEbert.com gave the film zero stars out of four, writing, "Corporate Retreat might be the worst movie of the year." Chad Collins of Dread Central wrote, "It's not funny. Not scary. Worst of all, it squanders its premise."

Meredith Jill Brown of Upcoming Horror Movies gave the film 8/10, calling it "fast-paced, grisly and shocking." Bee Delores of B-Sides & Badlands awarded the film 4 out of 5 stars, describing it as "a blend of Saw and The Menu" and praising its entertainment value.

The movie has generated more than 151 million online views of its trailers and social media posts.

== Accolades ==
Special Award for Best Acting Ensemble - Fantaspoa - Winner

Best Horror Feature - Raindance - Nominated
