= Hades (album) =

Studio album by Melanie Martinez
- Released: March 27, 2026
- Genres: Dark pop; alt-pop
- Length: 70:24
- Label: Atlantic
- Producers: CJ Baran; Halo Boy; Justin Greenwood; Arthur Besna; Malay

Melanie Martinez chronology
Portals (2023)	Hades (2026)

Singles from Hades
- 1. "Possession" Released: January 28, 2026; 2. "Disney Princess" Released: February 25, 2026; 3. "Uncanny Valley" Released: March 27, 2026; 4. "The Vatican" Released: May 22, 2026

Hades (stylized in all caps) is the fourth studio album by American singer Melanie Martinez. It was released on March 27, 2026, through Atlantic Records. The album serves as the first installment of a simultaneous release whose main theme would be both utopian and dystopian, with Hades mainly exploring the latter theme. Martinez released four singles from the album, "Possession", "Disney Princess", "Uncanny Valley" and "The Vatican".

== Background and development ==
On the Q&A opened in Martinez's Instagram Stories on October 10, 2025, she revealed that her upcoming project would be a double album, set to be released in 2026. She also shared that the recording of the albums has been finished, and that she is planning to film an upcoming movie related to it, featuring a new character other than Cry Baby. On January 23, 2026, Martinez cleared her social media as well as her official website, sparking speculation that her new album was coming.

== Theme and composition ==
Hades is a dark pop album, incorporating synth-driven elements and drawing on alt-pop styles. It continues Martinez's use of elaborate conceptual storytelling, incorporating characters, surreal imagery, and a distinctive sonic style. It employs allegory to address themes such as religion, power, gender, and societal systems, including critiques of religious hypocrisy, exemplified by the line "Catholic, Christian, kissing Jesus, licking AR-15s". According to Martinez, the theme of the simultaneous release is both utopian and dystopian; she stated that the project began as a "futuristic dystopia" but came to be understood as a reflection of present reality, describing Hades as "a cracked mirror" that, despite its underlying anger, resists emotional detachment and instead encourages engagement and the possibility of creating "something beautiful from the chaos". She emphasized that the album was less about imagining a distant dystopian future than about recognizing destructive power structures that already exist, where "control" is masked as "protection" and "exploitation" is framed as "opportunity".

Expanding on the themes of her earlier work, which explored childhood and transformation, Hades adopts a darker perspective, examining contemporary issues such as corruption and capitalism through a mythological framework, according to Riff Magazine. She explained that each song in Hades examines different "traps" created by an "evil, patriarchal energy". Danielle Holian of Atwood magazine believed that Hades "appears poised to explore the underworld that follows. Not rebirth, but reckoning. Not fantasy, but the machinery beneath it."

== Marketing and packaging ==
Martinez released the lead single of Hades, "Possession", on January 28, 2026. On February 1, she revealed the album's title and its release date, with pre-orders available on February 4. "Disney Princess" was released on February 25 as the second single from the album. The third single, "Uncanny Valley", was serviced to radio stations on the same day of the album's release. On May 22, Martinez released "The Vatican" as the album's fourth single.

In March, Martinez announced a live performance of Hades, titled the Hades Ritual. It began on the day of the album's release at United Palace in New York, concluding at the United Theater on Broadway in Los Angeles. In late June, Martinez performed various songs on The Today Show.

Korean artist Cho Giseok designed the photoshoots for the Hades era. The 18-track standard edition was released on cassette, CD and LP. Martinez also shared a box set which contains a signed artcard, CD and hoodie, as well as 32-page storybook which "brings the Hades story to life, following the journey of Circle".

=== Tour ===
On April 16, Martinez announced her sixth headlining and second all-arena tour, titled Hades: The Sacrifice. Set to be played between July and September of the same year, the tour will stop in several cities in the United States, as well as visit various European countries.

== Critical reception ==
Professional ratings
Aggregate scores
Source	Rating
Metacritic	74/100
Review scores
Source	Rating
AllMusic	4/5 stars
Riff Magazine	8/10
Rolling Stone	3.5/5 stars
Slant Magazine	1.5/5 stars
Variety	92/100 (Note: Although Variety does not offer the album's rating, Metacritic displays its score of 92 out of 100.)

According to the review aggregator Metacritic, Hades received "generally favorable reviews" based on a weighted average score of 74 out of 100 from 4 critic scores.

Writing for Riff Magazine, Vera Maksymiuk characterized Hades as "not designed to be easy listening", highlighting its chaotic and theatrical presentation as central to its intent. Michael Savio of Slant Magazine remarked that, as the album is envisioned as the first installment of a dystopia–utopia diptych, its eventual counterpart would ideally do more than mirror "our tumultuous times", expressing hope that it might also "make them a little more bearable". Variety's Jem Aswad described Hades as dense yet musically accessible, built on a melodic electronic pop framework that occasionally turns menacing. He also emphasized the intensity of the vocal performances and characterized the record as a powerful and socially resonant statement. Writing for Rolling Stone, Julyssa Lopez described Hades as featuring a narrative that is "often hard to follow", noting that the second half "loses some of its momentum". Nevertheless, Martinez was praised for bringing "a new way into every song without repeating herself", with the album ultimately viewed as an imaginative and creatively driven work. Rae Bozeman of Melodic Magazine noted that Martinez "will never shy away from controversial topics", highlighting how the album brings attention to issues "many tend to avoid". Bozeman also emphasized Martinez's use of an "evolving" sound to convey these themes, ultimately describing Hades as a "masterful and touching" work.

In a fan poll conducted by Billboard, Hades was ranked as the most popular new release of the week, receiving 67% of the vote and outperforming releases by Conan Gray, Raye, Charlie Puth, and Miley Cyrus.

== Commercial performance ==
Hades debuted at number three on the US Billboard 200. It also reached the number 1 spot on the US Top Rock & Alternative Albums chart with 84,000 album-equivalent units in its first week.

== Track listing ==
All tracks are written by Melanie Martinez and CJ Baran and produced by Baran, except where noted.

Hades track listing
No.	Title	Writer(s)	Producer(s)	Length
1.	"Garbage"			3:11
2.	"Is This a Cult?"	Martinez; Baran; Cameron Cade	Baran; Halo Boy	3:07
3.	"Possession"			3:08
4.	"White Boy with a Gun"	Martinez	Baran; Martinez; Justin Greenwood	4:03
5.	"Disney Princess"			4:05
6.	"Grudges"			3:38
7.	"Monopoly Man"			3:52
8.	"Avoidant"			4:30
9.	"Monolith"		Baran; Martinez	4:42
10.	"Weight Watchers"			3:20
11.	"The Plague"	Martinez; Baran; Arthur Besna	Baran; Martinez; Besna	3:38
12.	"Batshit Intelligence"	Martinez	Baran; Martinez; Greenwood	3:58
13.	"Gutter"			3:48
14.	"Uncanny Valley"	Martinez; Malay	Malay; Baran^{[a]}	3:16
15.	"The Vatican"			4:16
16.	"Hell's Front Porch"			3:22
17.	"Chatroom"		Baran; Martinez	6:25
18.	"The Last Two People on Earth"			4:05
Total length:				70:24

=== Notes ===
- ^{^[a]} signifies an additional producer.
- All track titles are stylized in all caps.

== Personnel ==
Credits were adapted from the album's liner notes.

=== Musicians ===
- Melanie Martinez – vocals (all tracks), guitar (tracks 4, 12), keyboards (7)
- CJ Baran – keyboards (1–8, 10–13, 15–18); bass, sound design, synthesizer programming (1–3, 5–11, 13, 15–18); drum programming (1, 2, 5–8, 10, 13, 15–18), string arrangement (1, 4, 9, 18), piano (2, 9), sequenced drums (3), guitar (5, 6, 8)
- Rhys Hastings – drums (1–7, 10, 12, 13, 15, 16, 18)
- Paul Cartwright – orchestration, string arrangement, concertmaster (1, 4, 9, 18)
- Nolan Markey – conductor (1, 4, 9, 18)
- Mark Robertson – principal second violin (1, 4, 9, 18)
- Benjamin Jacobson – violin (1, 4, 9, 18)
- Stephanie Yu – violin (1, 4, 9, 18)
- Ina Veli – violin (1, 4, 9, 18)
- Katie Sloan – violin (1, 4, 9, 18)
- Ashoka Thiagarajan – violin (1, 4, 9, 18)
- Anna Kostyuchek – violin (1, 4, 9, 18)
- Carolyn Riley – principal viola (1, 4, 9, 18)
- Linnea Powell – viola (1, 4, 9, 18)
- Marta Honer – viola (1, 4, 9, 18)
- Timothy Loo –principal cello (1, 4, 9, 18)
- Hillary Smith – cello (1, 4, 9, 18)
- Eric Shetzen – principal bass (1, 4, 9, 18)
- Halo Boy – bass, drum programming, keyboards, piano, synthesizer programming (2)
- Justin Greenwood – bass, drum programming (4, 12); keyboards (12)
- Arthur Besna – bass, drum programming, keyboards, sound design, synthesizer programming (11)
- Malay – drum programming, keyboards, synthesizer programming (14)
- Fletcher Sheridan – male vocals (15)
- Luc Kliener – male vocals (15)
- Dermot Kiernan – male vocals (15)
- Michael Lichtenauer – male vocals (15)
- Brett McDermid – male vocals (15)

=== Technical and visuals ===
- Melanie Martinez – executive production, creative direction, art direction, design
- CJ Baran – executive production, engineering
- Arthur Besna – engineering (11)
- Malay – engineering (14)
- Nick Trapani – engineering assistance, editing (1–13, 15–18))
- Zack Zajdel – engineering assistance (3)
- Adam Michalak – orchestral engineering (1, 4)
- Sonny DiPerri – drum engineering (3)
- Mitch McCarthy – mixing
- Nathan Dantzler – mastering
- Josh Baldwin – drum technician (3)
- Cho Gi-seok – creative direction, photography
- Kim Jiyun – assistant direction
- Seo Hyedan – assistant direction
- Virgilio Tzaj – art direction, design
- Malina Stearns – special makeup effects
- Lisa Jarvis – styling
- William Scott Blair – hair styling
- Laurel Charleston – makeup
- A Prjct – art production
- Shin Yechan – director of photography
- Park Byung Ju – lighting direction
- Mumu Kim – production design
- Satangelista – booklet illustrations

== Charts ==
Chart performance
Chart (2026)	Peak position
Australian Albums (ARIA)	4
Austrian Albums (Ö3 Austria)	9
Belgian Albums (Ultratop Flanders)	6
Belgian Albums (Ultratop Wallonia)	7
Canadian Albums (Billboard)	13
Croatian International Albums (HDU)	2
Czech Albums (ČNS IFPI)	88
Dutch Albums (Album Top 100)	7
French Albums (SNEP)	28
German Albums (Offizielle Top 100)	11
German Pop Albums (Offizielle Top 100)	4
Greek Albums (IFPI)	88
Hungarian Albums (MAHASZ)	10
Irish Albums (Official Charts)	8
Italian Albums (FIMI)	16
Lithuanian Albums (AGATA)	59
New Zealand Albums (RMNZ)	7
Polish Albums (ZPAV)	10
Portuguese Albums (AFP)	9
Scottish Albums (Official Charts)	2
Slovak Albums (ČNS IFPI)	26
Spanish Albums (Promusicae)	12
Swedish Physical Albums (Sverigetopplistan)	20
Swiss Albums (Schweizer Hitparade)	16
UK Albums (Official Charts)	5
US Billboard 200	3
US Top Rock & Alternative Albums (Billboard)	1

== Release history ==
List of release dates and formats
Region	Date	Format	Label	Ref.
Various	March 27, 2026	Cassette; CD; digital download; LP; streaming	Atlantic	
