= Void (song) =

Single by Melanie Martinez

from the album Portals
- B-side: "Evil"
- Released: March 29, 2023
- Length: 4:07 (album version); 3:32 (radio edit)
- Label: Atlantic
- Songwriter: Melanie Adele Martinez
- Producer: Melanie Martinez

Melanie Martinez singles chronology
"Death" (2023)	"Void" (2023)	"Evil" (2023)

Music video
- "Void" on YouTube

"Void" is a song by American singer-songwriter Melanie Martinez. It was released through Atlantic Records on March 29, 2023, as the second single from her (Note: Martinez uses she/her and they/them pronouns. This article uses she/her pronouns for consistency.) third studio album, Portals. Commercially, it peaked on the Billboard Hot 100 at number 61. The song received a music video directed by Martinez.

== Background and release ==
"Void" is one of the only songs Martinez released that she has solely written and produced, the other being "Light Shower" which is also from Portals. The song became Martinez' second original song to chart on the US Billboard Hot 100 and as well highest charting song to date, reaching number 61. On June 13, 2023, a music video for the song premiered and debuted with nearly a million views within its first seven hours of release. "Void" was nominated at the 2023 MTV Video Music Award for Best Visual Effects but ultimately lost to Taylor Swift's "Anti-Hero". On September 26, 2025, the song was released on a physical 4-inch vinyl format which featured "Evil" as the B-side.

== Accolades ==
Awards and nominations for "Void"
Organization	Year	Category	Result	Ref.
MTV Video Music Awards	2023	Best Visual Effects	Nominated	

== Personnel ==
- Melanie Adele Martinez – vocals
- Mitch McCarthy – drums
- Melanie Martinez – producer
- CJ Baran – engineer
- Mitch McCarthy – mixing
- Emerson Mancini – mastering

== Charts ==
=== Weekly charts ===
Weekly chart performance for "Void"
Chart (2023)	Peak position
Canada Hot 100 (Billboard)	51
Global 200 (Billboard)	87
Ireland (IRMA)	51
New Zealand Hot Singles (RMNZ)	8
UK Singles (Official Charts)	44
US Billboard Hot 100	61
US Hot Rock & Alternative Songs (Billboard)	5
US Pop Airplay (Billboard)	23

=== Year-end charts ===
Year-end chart performance for "Void"
Chart (2023)	Position
US Hot Rock & Alternative Songs (Billboard)	36

== Release history ==
Release dates and formats for "Void"
Region	Date	Format(s)	Label	Ref.
Various	March 29, 2023	Digital download; streaming	Atlantic	
Italy	March 31, 2023	Contemporary hit radio	Warner	
United States	April 11, 2023	Alternative radio	Atlantic	
