= Hannah Alper =

Canadian activist (born 2000s)

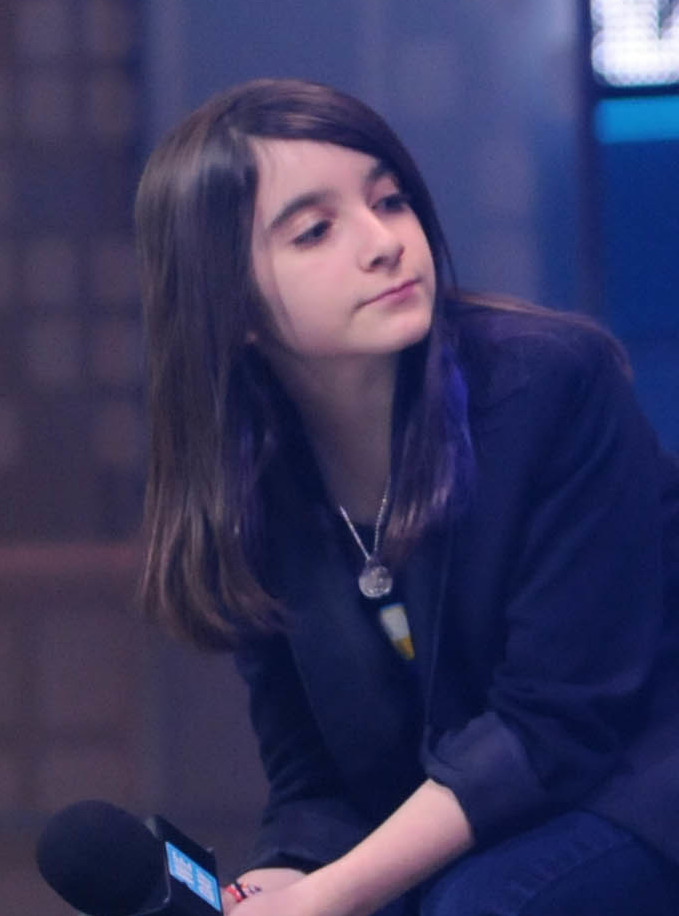
- At We Day Seattle, 23 April 2015
- Born: 2002/2003 (age 23–24)
- Education: University of Western Ontario
- Occupations: Activist; blogger; journalist
- Years active: 2012–present
- Website: callmehannah.ca

Hannah Alper (born 2002/2003) is a Canadian activist, journalist, and author.

== Early life ==
Alper was born in 2003 to writer Eric Alper and his wife Candace Alper. In 2013, her mother worked "helping children in their community through social programs and summer camps and music therapy". Her father worked for eOne Music Canada while co-founding a charity to buy hearing aids for children in need.

== Career ==
In July 2012, Alper launched her blog—Call Me Hannah—where she spoke about causes important to her: animal welfare, habitat destruction, and the natural environment; within the year, her blog had received 100,000 page-views. In 2013, Alper was lauded for her activism by The Grid in their "3rd Annual Menschies". She gave a motivational speech for ME to WE, served as an ambassador for Free the Children, spoke at the World Wildlife Fund's Toronto event for Earth Hour, and raised CA$975 (in pennies) from schoolchildren for Free the Children. Her 2014 TEDx talk, "How to find your spark", was viewed over 2400 times in less than one week. That same year, Alper was the official blogger for the Juno Awards.

Released on 1 November 2017, Alper's first book Momentus: Small Acts, Big Change is a collection of interviews with 19 of her role models (including Singh, Yousafzai, and Lily Collins), hoping to empower youth to take action and make the changes they want to see in the world. Nominated by Lilly Singh in 2017, Alper was the only teenager of Bloomberg Businessweek's 19 people to watch in 2018. By late 2017, Alper had written for The Huffington Post and interviewed Malala Yousafzai, Craig Kielburger, Spencer West, Jian Ghomeshi, and Severn Cullis-Suzuki.

By 2020 she had expanded her advocacy to anti-bullying and "kindraising", what she described as "changing our communities and the world through kindness." At the same time, her blog had "a huge following", accumulated 40,000 Twitter followers, 13,000 Instagram followers, and earned her an interview by George Stroumboulopoulos. By mid-2020, she had given "more than 400 speeches", and was elected co-president of the B'nai B'rith Youth Organization's Lake Ontario Region chapter. Alper featured in the pilot episode of CitizenKids: Earth Comes First, a TV series adapted from the Kids Can Press series of CitizenKid books; she, Cooper Price, Charlene Rocha, and series star Sophia Mathur "set out to tackle climate change issues from the perspective of today’s youth."

== Journalism ==
In the 2020s, Alper continued her career in journalism after graduating from Western University. She worked at The Western Gazette, the university's student newspaper, where she served as deputy editor. The Canadian Association of Journalists also listed her as a deputy editor of the newspaper in its mentorship programme.

In 2025 and 2026, Alper's journalism appeared in several Canadian publications, including The Globe and Mail, Maclean's, The Toronto Star and The Gazette (formerly The Western Gazette). Her articles covered topics such as Canadian cultural figures, university life, technology, social issues and local communities.

Among her published work were "The Perks of Working On-Campus" in Maclean's, "A new chapter for Church Street: This queer café is joining the fight to keep the Village's soul alive" in The Toronto Star, and "Things to do in London on a budget this April" in The Gazette.

In October 2026, she wrote an article for The Globe and Mail about music journalist Andrea Warner, titled "Journalist Andrea Warner ‘changed the way we write about music'".
