= K–12 (film) =

2019 musical art film directed by Melanie Martinez

- Film poster
- Directed by: Melanie Martinez; Alissa Torvinen
- Written by: Melanie Martinez
- Produced by: Wes Teshome; Phil Botti; Tyler Zelinsky; Kimberly Stuckwisch; Alissa Torvinen; Gergely Varga
- Starring: Melanie Martinez; Emma Harvey; Zión Moreno; Megan Gage; Zinnett Hendrix; Jesy McKinney; Marsalis Wilson; Maggie Budzyna
- Cinematography: Josh McKie
- Edited by: Melanie Martinez; Emilie Aubry; Niles Howard
- Music by: Melanie Martinez; Michael Keenan
- Production companies: Little Ugly Productions; Frame 48
- Distributed by: Abramorama (North America); Atlantic Records (Worldwide)
- Release dates: September 3, 2019 (Los Angeles); September 5, 2019 (in select theaters); September 6, 2019
- Running time: 92 minutes
- Country: United States
- Budget: $5–6 million
- Box office: $359,377

K–12 is a 2019 American musical art film written and directed by Melanie Martinez and co-directed by Alissa Torvinen. The film accompanies Martinez's second studio album of the same name and stars Martinez, Emma Harvey, (Note: Harvey also goes by the mononym Elita.) Zión Moreno, Megan Gage, Zinnett Hendrix, Jesy McKinney, Marsalis Wilson, and Maggie Budzyna. The film follows Cry Baby (played by Martinez) and her best friend Angelita (Harvey), who embark on a mission to take down the oppressive system of K–12 Sleepaway School.

K–12 was shown in select theaters for one day only on September 5, 2019, and was officially released on September 6, 2019, by Abramorama in North American territories and Atlantic Records internationally through YouTube. The film received favorable reviews from critics and fans alike.

== Plot ==
Cry Baby prepares to attend K–12 Sleepaway School. On the bus, her schoolmates bully her ("Wheels on the Bus"). When the bus loses control, Cry Baby and her friend Angelita activate supernatural abilities, allowing them to levitate the bus and land outside of K–12. The two briefly see a ghost before hurrying to class.

During class, a student is removed after refusing to stand for the Pledge of Allegiance. Cry Baby lends an eraser to a boy named Brandon; his girlfriend, Kelly, becomes jealous and threatens Cry Baby. Cry Baby telephones her mother for advice, but she doesn't respond due to being passed out drunk. Cry Baby imagines a conversation between her mother and father ("Class Fight"). At recess, Kelly attacks Cry Baby, who strangles Kelly with her braids until head teacher Ms. Daphne intervenes, sending them to the principal's office.

Cry Baby learns that the principal is medicating students to control them. She poisons him, but he recovers promptly ("The Principal"). Later, Cry Baby arrives late to class and is turned into a marionette puppet ("Show & Tell"). Still in her doll form, a wounded Cry Baby is sent to the nurse's office, where Angelita returns her to her human form before the nurses restrain and forcibly medicate them ("Nurse's Office"). They are saved by Lilith, an angelic spirit guide, who reveals that they are immortal beings and instructs them to stay in K–12. Later, Cry Baby and Angelita hear music coming from the ballroom and enter to see a crowd of dancing ghosts, but flee before the ghosts can catch them.

In drama class, Cry Baby requests a different role, but is ridiculed by the class ("Drama Club"). During the school play, Cry Baby uses her abilities to free the audience from their brainwashed state. Cry Baby and Angelita meet Celeste, a student with similar abilities.

Cry Baby has disdain with rape culture over men ("Strawberry Shortcake"). In a dreamlike sequence, Cry Baby speaks with Lilith again. At lunch, Kelly attempts to befriend Cry Baby, but Cry Baby declines and befriends a girl named Magnolia instead ("Lunchbox Friends"). The group notices that Kelly's friend Fleur also has supernatural abilities. Cry Baby starts a food fight to get Fleur away from Kelly. Learning that Fleur is bulimic, she encourages Fleur to love herself ("Orange Juice"). After returning to the cafeteria, Cry Baby is sent to detention when Kelly informs Leo, the principal's son, of her whereabouts. Her powers weaken, but she manipulates Leo into releasing her ("Detention"). Angelita and her biology teacher begin flirting. Cry Baby saves her before the teacher can dissect her ("Teacher's Pet"). The girls devise a plan to destroy the school, which Leo detects on security footage. Afterwards, the two share a joint in the topiary garden.

Cry Baby expresses her desire for a loyal, accepting partner ("High School Sweethearts"). A student named Ben prepares to ask Cry Baby to the school dance. Leo takes credit by asking Cry Baby to the dance instead. She accepts, falling in love with him. At the dance, Leo reveals the girls' plan over the loudspeaker and locks the doors, forcing the students to dance ("Recess"). Cry Baby seduces Leo and convinces him to escape with her and the girls. She then instructs the students to evacuate the school. Everyone flees except Kelly.

Ben approaches Cry Baby, confessing his feelings and that he, too, has supernatural powers. They blow a spit bubble, encapsulating the school, and leap to safety as the school floats away and explodes. Cry Baby kisses Ben. Lilith reappears from a portal-like door in the ground. Cry Baby watches her friends enter the door, hesitating when Angelita implores her to follow them.

== Cast ==
- Melanie Martinez as Cry Baby
- Emma Harvey as Angelita
- Zión Moreno as Fleur
- Megan Gage as Celeste
- Zinnett Hendrix as Magnolia
- Jesy McKinney as Leo
- Marsalis Wilson as Ben
- Maggie Budzyna as Kelly
- Bence Balogh as Jason
- Vilmos Heim as Brandon
- Alissa Torvinen as Ghost Girl
- Kate O'Donnell as Ms. Harper
- Balázs Csémy as Dean
- Natalia Toth as Lucy
- Joel Francis-Williams as Henry
- Zacky Agama as Thomas
- Olga Kovács as Ms. Penelope
- Kimesha Campbell as Lilith
- Katie Sheridan as Lorelai
- Toby Edington as The Principal
- Anne Wittman as Ms. Daphne
- Scott Young as Mr. Cornwell
- Laurka Lanczki as Holly
- Ágota Dunai as Rachel
- Rebeka Peter as Chloe

== Development ==
In a 2017 interview with Billboard, Martinez said that her (Note: Martinez uses she/her and they/them pronouns. This article uses she/her pronouns for consistency.) then-untitled second studio album was finished and would be accompanied by a film that she was writing and directing and that it would be "all of the videos together of the next record, all thirteen, with dialogue and whatnot in between connecting all of them together." In a 2019 interview after the film's release, Martinez stated she wrote the film to portray school as "a condensed version of life." She drew from her own experiences of bullying to portray the bullying of which is seen in the film. She explains further on the film's bright and pastel colors contrasted with macabre and thought-provoking visuals and plot-lines in an interview with Alternative Press the same year, saying "It's necessary because it's just a reflection of life, and life has ups and downs, both light and dark aspects."

== Production ==
The film's costume design was done by Martinez and Christina Flannery. It ended up being filmed on location in Budapest, Hungary over a span of 31 days, and at Eszterháza. On January 2, 2019, Martinez began editing the film. Martinez cited visual artists such as Mark Ryden, Nicoletta Ceccoli, and the 1988 surrealist Jan Švankmajer film Alice and pop surrealism as inspiration for the film's visuals.

== Release ==
On May 15, 2019, a first teaser was released. On May 22, 2019, a second teaser was released. On May 29, 2019, a third teaser was released revealing the release date. On June 17, 2019, during the MTV Movie Awards, a TV spot was released, containing a snippet of the song "Nurse's Office". On July 23, 2019, the official trailer was released, with a snippet of "Show and Tell" at the end of it.

The film had its premiere in Los Angeles on September 3, 2019. Two days later, on September 5, 2019, it had its US-wide premiere in New York City at the AMC Empire 25, being shown in select theaters at the same time all around the country. It was officially released on September 6, 2019, through VOD, and saw a home video release in a DVD that is packaged with some releases of the CD of the album released the same day. Martinez also released the film on her YouTube channel for free, then briefly making it so only YouTube Premium members can watch it that way, before reverting it back to free. The release of the film on her YouTube channel was #2 on Trending the day of its release and have over 100 million views.

== Reception ==
=== Box office ===
K–12 grossed $303,230 domestically and an additional $56,147 from international territories, bringing its total worldwide gross to $359,377. It was the 6th highest grossing film domestically on the night of its theatrical release.

=== Critical reception ===
The film received generally positive, favorable reviews from Martinez's fans and critics alike. Alternative Press reviewed the film, commenting "[Martinez] presents a literal lesson on life... With Martinez, it comes in pastel pink and disguised by a bubble gum flavor, making it easy enough to accept while still getting the same expected results." io9 reviewed the film as well, stating that "When you listen to Melanie Martinez's K–12, the album's themes about bullying, insecurity, and the importance of learning to embrace one's imperfections are all readily apparent. But when you watch the accompanying K–12 film and visually drink in the story Martinez has created, it becomes a much more powerful fairytale about the lives we lead long after leaving school." Idolator also reviewed the movie, praising it for expanding the Cry Baby universe and for its messages, and saying "It can't be overstated what an epic achievement this is [for Martinez]."
