= Melanie Martinez =

American singer-songwriter (born 1995)

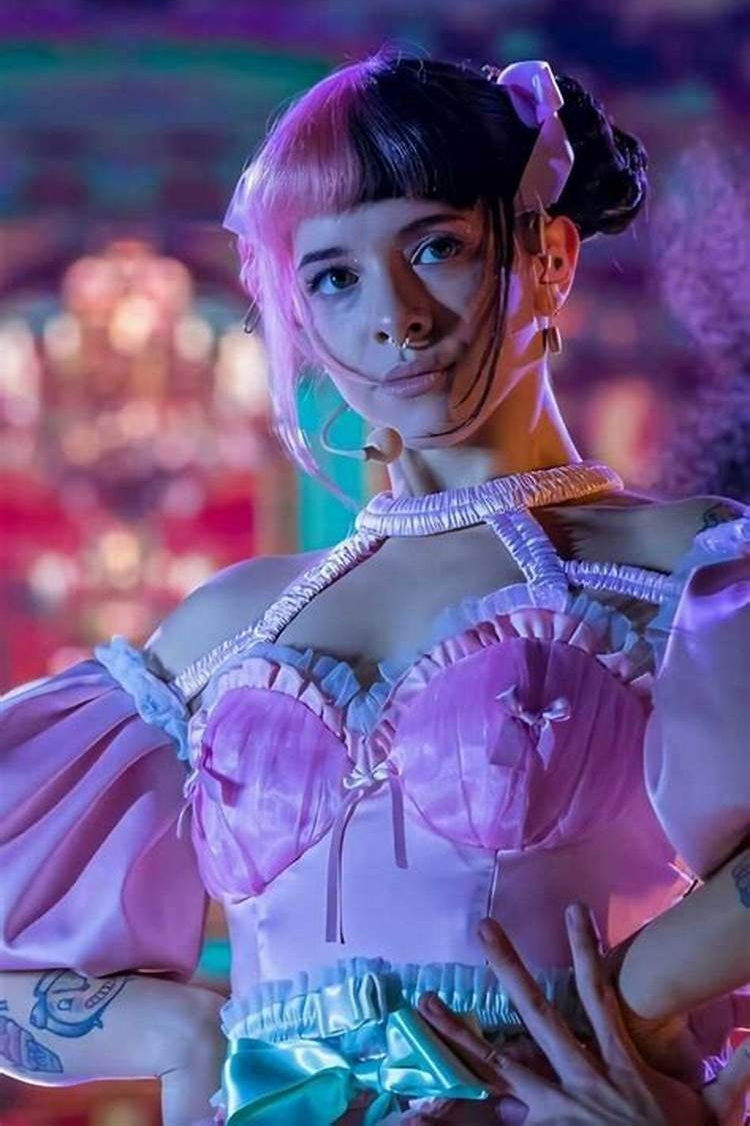
- Martinez performing in 2019
- Born: Melanie Adele Martinez; April 28, 1995 (age 31); New York City, U.S.
- Occupation: Singer-songwriter
- Years active: 2012–present
- Musical career
- Genres: Pop; alternative pop; electropop; art pop
- Instruments: Vocals; guitar
- Works: Albums; songs
- Label: Atlantic
- Website: Official website

Melanie Adele Martinez (born April 28, 1995) is an American singer-songwriter. Born in Astoria, Queens, and raised in Baldwin, New York, Martinez rose to fame in 2012 after appearing on season 3 of the American television talent show The Voice. Following the show, she (Note: Martinez uses she/her and they/them pronouns, as indicated on her Instagram page. This article uses she/her pronouns for consistency.) was signed to Atlantic Records and released her debut single "Dollhouse", which was certificed 2× platinum by the Recording Industry Association of America (RIAA). It was followed by her debut extended play of the same name (2014).

In 2015, Martinez released her debut studio album, Cry Baby. Serving as the first part of the Cry Baby trilogy, it met commercial success, certified double platinum by the RIAA and spawning RIAA platinum-certified songs like "Pity Party", "Soap", and "Play Date". The album peaked at number 6 on the US Billboard 200 and topped the US Top Alternative Albums chart.

K–12 was released as Martinez's second studio album and a soundtrack album in 2019; it was accompanied by the film of the same name. Reaching number 3 on the Billboard 200, it also peaked atop the Top Alternative Albums and Top Soundtracks charts. Portals (2023) followed, peaking at number 2 on the Billboard 200. Hades, a double album along with her fifth studio album Elysium, was released in 2026, debuting at number 3 in the United States. Martinez adopted a new character in the album, named Circle.

Known for her colorful two-toned hair and bangs, Martinez's visual style plays an important part in her music videos and performances. She came to fame cultivating a doll-like look complemented by babydoll dresses and emotive facial expressions.

== Early life ==
Melanie Adele Martinez was born on April 28, 1995, in Astoria, Queens, to parents Mery and Jose Martinez who are of Dominican and Puerto Rican descent. Her family moved to Baldwin, New York, on Long Island, when Martinez was four.

Martinez attended Plaza Elementary School, where her teacher Mr. Nadien taught her to sing. She began writing poetry in kindergarten and was a shy, emotional child with few friends, often crying when overwhelmed. She also practiced photography and painting. Her emotional nature led others to call her a "cry baby", which inspired the character of her debut studio album, Cry Baby.

Martinez grew up in a "traditional Latin household" that she described as "super-conservative" where she was made to feel shameful about her sexuality, feeling as if she would not be accepted if she came out as bisexual. She says that her family is now fully accepting of her sexuality.

At fourteen, Martinez's family could not afford guitar lessons, so she taught herself how to play guitar by studying chord diagrams of songs she enjoyed, which she found online. She wrote her first songs by pairing her poetry with the chord diagrams and began sharing music on her YouTube channel, but says that playing guitar "eventually got stale". Martinez graduated from Baldwin High School.

== Career ==
=== 2012–2014: The Voice and Dollhouse EP ===
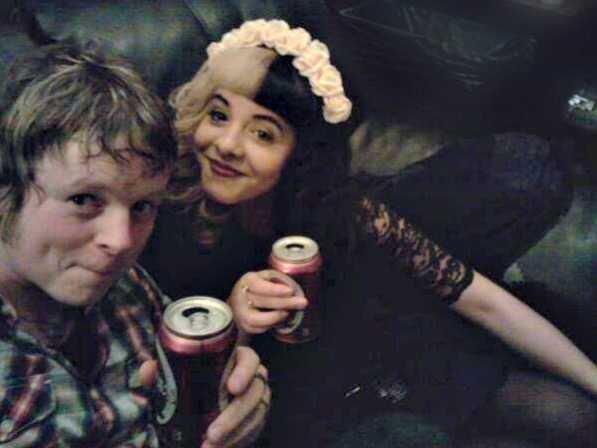
Martinez (right) with Terry McDermott (left) in 2013, during The Voice

In 2012, during her junior year of high school, Martinez participated in the MSG's Varsity Talent Show, a televised talent competition. She sang the Beatles's rendition of "Money (That's What I Want)" by Barrett Strong and "Shake Me, Wake Me (When It's Over)" by the Four Tops. She was eliminated in the second round. Martinez then auditioned for the third season of The Voice. The initial, untelevised audition was an open call, held at Javits Center. Several months after the initial audition, while at Roosevelt Field Mall, Martinez received word that she had advanced to the "second round". She then received multiple callbacks until she was finally selected to audition on the show itself.

Martinez auditioned singing Britney Spears's "Toxic" with three of the four judges (Adam Levine, CeeLo Green and Blake Shelton) hitting their "I Want You" button. Martinez ultimately chose Adam Levine to be her coach. In the Battle Round, Martinez competed against Caitlin Michele. They performed a duet of the Ellie Goulding's song "Lights". Martinez won and moved on to the Knockout Round, where she was paired with Sam James. She chose to sing La Roux's "Bulletproof". Levine eliminated James, and Martinez moved on to the Live Rounds as one of the five remaining members of Team Adam. In week one of the Live Rounds, Martinez sang "Hit the Road Jack". Public vote saved Team Adam members Amanda Brown and Bryan Keith. Levine then chose Martinez over Loren Allred and Joselyn Rivera to remain in the competition. In third week, Martinez's performance of "Seven Nation Army" finished the voting period at number 10 on the iTunes Top 200 Single Chart, causing her iTunes votes to be multiplied by ten. It occurred again in week four, when "Too Close" ended the voting period at #6.

Martinez was eliminated by audience vote in week five, along with the fellow Team Adam member Amanda Brown, leaving Levine with no artists. In response, Martinez said, "I never expected to get this far and this is beyond what I've ever dreamed of. I'm just so glad I got to express who I am as an artist and really touch people's hearts because that was the ultimate goal".

– Studio version of performance reached the top 10 on iTunes

Round	Song	Original Artist	Date	Order	Result
Blind Audition	"Toxic"	Britney Spears	September 7, 2012	4.1	3 Chairs Turned; Joined Team Adam
Battle Round	"Lights" (vs. Caitlin Michelle)	Ellie Goulding	October 15, 2012	11.5	Saved by Coach
Knockout Round	"Bulletproof" (vs. Sam James)	La Roux	October 29, 2012	16.5	Saved by Coach
Live Playoffs	"Hit the Road Jack"	Ray Charles	November 5, 2012	18.3	Safe (Coach's Save)
Top 12	"Cough Syrup"	Young the Giant	November 12, 2012	21.9	Saved by Public Vote
Top 10	"Seven Nation Army"	The White Stripes	November 19, 2012	23.3	Saved by Public Vote
Top 8	"Too Close"	Alex Clare	November 26, 2012	25.4	Saved by Public Vote
Top 6	"The Show" (Coach's choice)	Lenka	December 3, 2012	27.10	Eliminated
Top 6	"Crazy" (Artist's choice)	Gnarls Barkley	December 3, 2012	27.6	Eliminated

After the show, Martinez began working independently on original material, which she says she spent the majority of 2013 writing. She released her debut single, "Dollhouse", on February 9, 2014. She later compared the song's story to Edward Scissorhands, saying "[It's] the perfect home with the perfect lawn and they all look the same. But behind each house there's a screwed up group of people who are hiding behind wealth and perfection." Martinez also released a music video for the track, which was fan-funded by an Indiegogo page created by Martinez, and hair, makeup, and shooting were all done by friends of hers. The song was produced and cowritten by NYC songwriting duo Kinetics & One Love.

On April 7, 2014, Martinez signed to Atlantic Records and released her debut EP, Dollhouse, a month later on May 19, 2014. The only single from the EP, "Carousel", reached number nine on the Alternative Digital Songs chart. It was certified gold by the Recording Industry Association of America (RIAA), and featured in a preview for FX's miniseries American Horror Story: Freak Show. She promoted the EP with the accompanying tour Dollhouse Tour, which lasted from June 2014 to March 2015.

=== 2015–2022: Cry Baby and K–12 ===
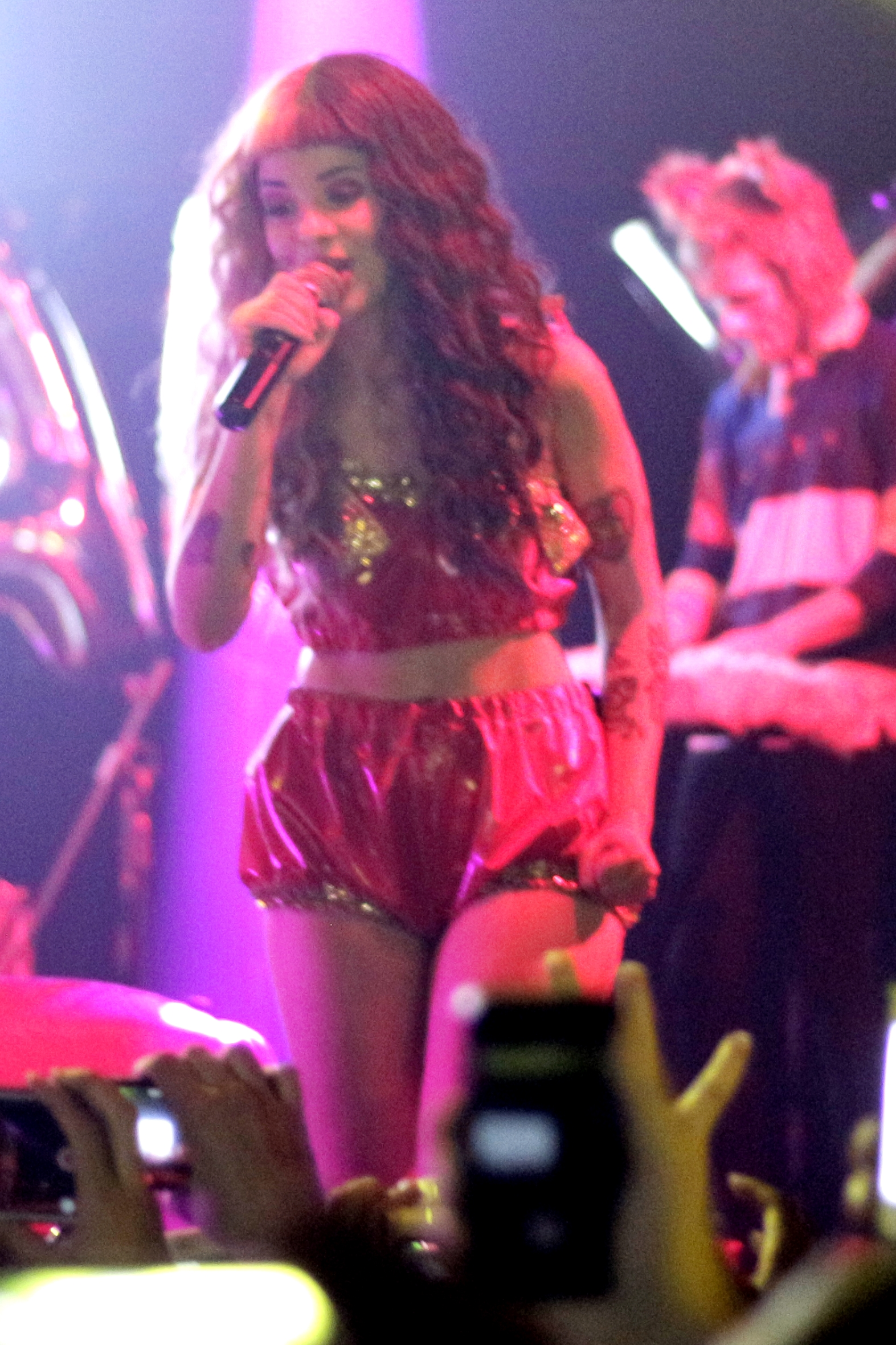
Martinez performing in 2015 on the Cry Baby Tour

On June 1, 2015, Martinez released the single "Pity Party", which sampled Lesley Gore's "It's My Party". It was followed by the album's second single, "Soap", which reached number twelve on the Alternative Digital Songs and number sixteen on the Pop Digital Songs chart. The third single, "Sippy Cup", followed on July 31. Her debut studio album, Cry Baby, was released on August 14, 2015, to moderate critical acclaim and debuted at number 6 on the US Billboard 200. The album was certified platinum by the RIAA on February 24, 2017. Martinez went on the Cry Baby Tour to promote the album, which lasted from 2015 to 2017.

In May 2016, Martinez exclusively released her second EP, Pity Party. A month later, she started working on and recording her second studio album. In November 2016, Martinez released her third EP, Cry Baby's Extra Clutter, a physical vinyl release of the bonus tracks from Cry Baby. It also features "Gingerbread Man", a Christmas-themed single which was initially released in December 2015 on SoundCloud but later released as a solo single in January 2016.

In October 2016, Martinez released a commercial for her fragrance, Cry Baby Perfume Milk, noting that the "idea for this perfume [had] been cultivating in [her] brain since the moment [she] finished writing" Cry Baby. The perfume was directly distributed by Martinez's record label, Atlantic, making them the first record label to distribute a fragrance. Martinez also collaborated with cosmetics company Lime Crime to release two exclusive lipsticks: a blue lipstick called "Cry Baby" on August 17, 2015, and a brown lipstick called "Teddy Bear" on March 9, 2016.

Martinez's former friend Timothy Heller accused Martinez of sexual assault via Twitter on December 4, 2017. Martinez denied these accusations, proclaiming that any intimacy between the two was consensual. On December 22, Martinez released the song "Piggyback" via SoundCloud, believed to reflect on the allegations made by Heller.

On May 15, 2019, Martinez released a teaser trailer for her second studio album, K–12. It was eventually released on September 6 and debuted at number 3 on the Billboard 200. Also serving as a soundtrack album, it was accompanied by a musical film of the same name, which was written and directed by Martinez. In an interview with People, Martinez alluded to future sequels and visual albums being released. The album was promoted with the K–12 Tour began on October 13, 2019, in Washington, D.C. and concluded prematurely on February 17, 2020, in Brixton, England due to the COVID-19 pandemic.

In January 2020, Martinez announced she was working on an EP titled After School, which was released that year and served as the deluxe edition of K–12. On February 10, Martinez released a stand-alone single, "Copy Cat", which featured Tierra Whack, marking Martinez's first feature. She later released a second single from the EP, "Fire Drill", on June 26, which had previously featured in the credits of the K–12 film. However, both songs were not included on After School which was eventually delayed and released on September 25.

In April, a song from Cry Baby "Play Date" became one of the top 100 most-played songs on Spotify in the US after gaining popularity on TikTok. In 2021, Martinez featured on Forbes's Under 30 list.

=== 2023–2025: Portals ===
On February 18, 2023, after archiving all her Instagram posts, Martinez teased her third studio album, Portals. The album was released on March 31, 2023, and was promoted with the singles, "Death" and "Void" which charted at number 95 and 61 respectively, marking her first original appearances on the Billboard Hot 100. (Note: While participating on The Voice in 2012, Martinez's covers of "Seven Nation Army" and "Too Close" had charted on the Hot 100.) Portals debuted number two on the Billboard 200, selling 142,000 equivalent album units its first week. It also topped the Top Alternative Albums chart. In May 2023, Martinez embarked on the Portals Tour. Martinez was nominated for the VMA's Best Visual Effects, for the music for her single "Void". Since the album's release, a further five music videos have appeared, one featuring the song "Tunnel Vision" in December 2023, a second in February 2024 for "Faerie Soirée", a third in May 2024 for "Light Shower", followed by "Spider Web" and "Leeches" in December 2024 and March 2025, respectively.

In November, Martinez announced the launch of Portals Parfums, a collection of four fragrances developed in collaboration with indie perfumery Flower Shop Perfumes. The collection launched in a sculptural vessel modeled after Martinez's four eyed "Cry Baby" alter ego which houses all four fragrances and retails for $275.

In 2024, Martinez embarked on her sold-out arena tour titled The Trilogy Tour, featuring songs from her three studio albums, Cry Baby, K–12, and Portals. She packed legendary global arena venues, including two consecutive sold-out nights at NYC's Madison Square Garden. In 2024, Martinez also headlined the world-famous Lollapalooza festival in Chicago as well as the Corona Capital festival in Mexico City.

=== 2026–present: Hades and Elysium ===
On January 22, 2026, Martinez blacked out her social media accounts alongside her website. A day later, she posted a teaser video for her then upcoming fourth studio album, which mentioned a new character Circle, described as a "new pop star out of 'Hades Tech', who has been extracted from a secluded cult". On January 27, Martinez announced the album's lead single, "Possession", released a day later. After announcing her fourth studio album, Hades, she announced the second single of the album, "Disney Princess", released on February 25. Along with the album's release on March 27, "Uncanny Valley" was released as its third single.

Throughout the start of 2026, Martinez performed at several shows, known as the Listening Chamber Events, in support of the album. These shows are set to be followed by her sixth headlining concert and second all-arena tour, Hades: The Sacrifice, which will visit North America and several countries across Europe. Martinez later announced the title of her upcoming fifth studio album, Elysium.

== Personal life ==
Martinez dated fellow musician Oliver Tree in 2019, but they split amicably in June 2020. Following Tree's 2026 death, Martinez expressed her shock and heartbreak at the news in an Instagram story.

== Artistry ==
=== Musical style ===
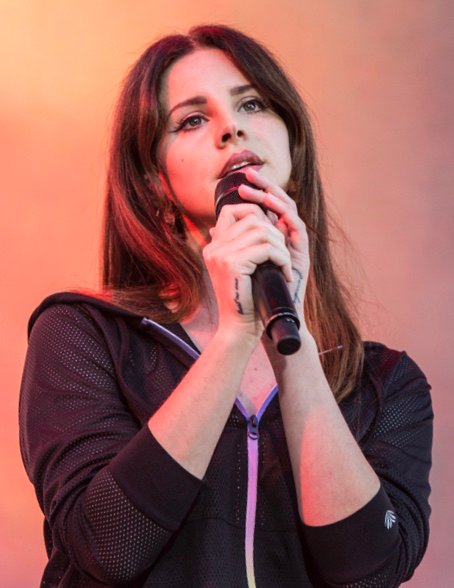
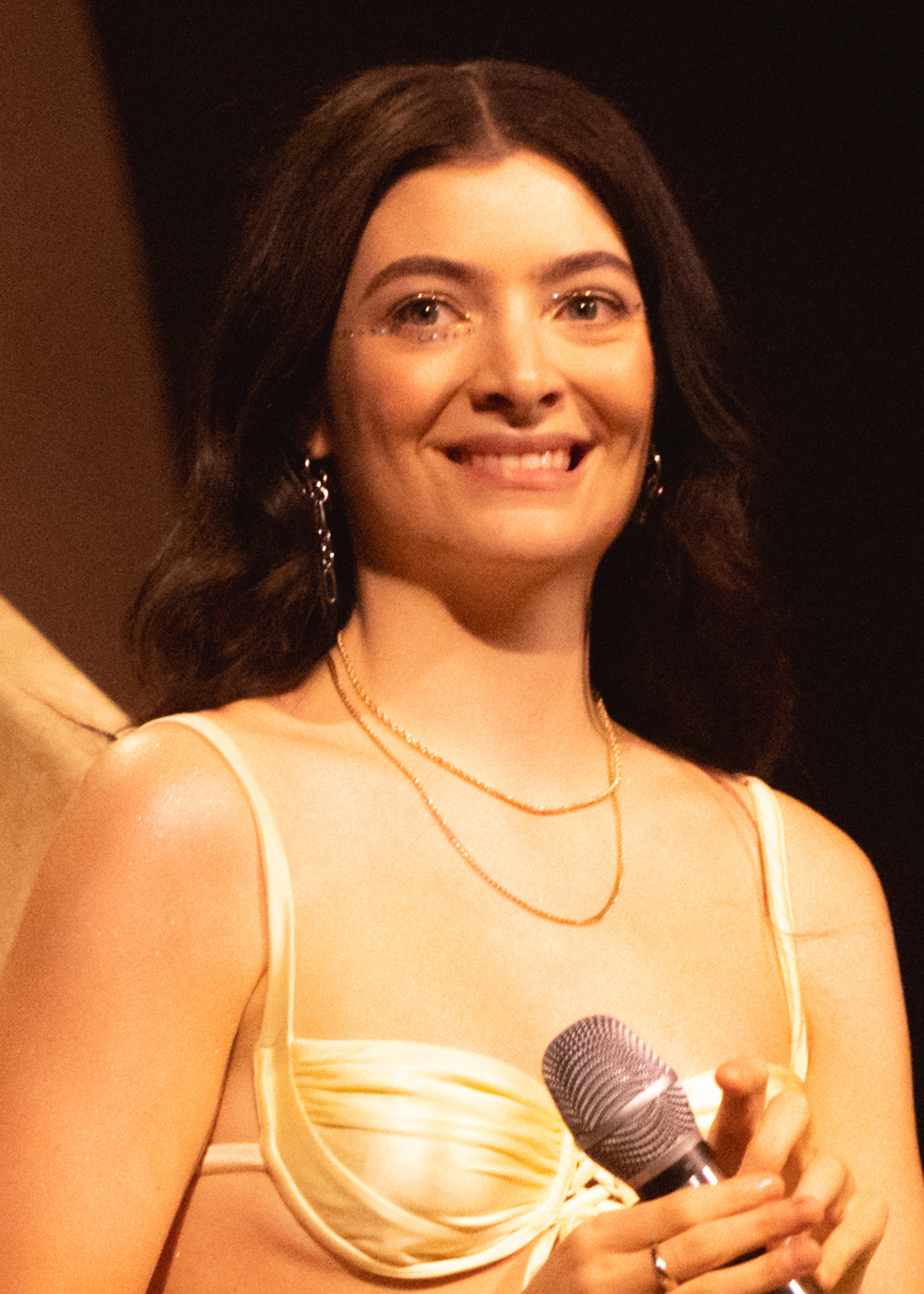
Martinez's music has been compared to Lana Del Rey (left) and Lorde (right).

Martinez's music has been described as pop, alternative pop, art pop, electropop, and dark pop. Cry Baby and K–12 were seen to have hip hop and R&B undertones. Portals saw Melanie venturing into experimental sounds and pop-rock. Martinez's music has been described by The Guardian as "off-kilter, sweary electropop". Rolling Stone described Martinez's music as "twisted lullabies about love, danger and madness", and compared her music to that of "'Coin-Operated Boy'-era Dresden Dolls" and Lana Del Rey. The New York Times's Jon Pareles described her music as "perch[ing] prettily tinkling keyboards and concise pop choruses amid the slow, ominous basslines and twitchy percussion of Southern hip-hop – a candy-coated variation on the dirges of Lorde and Lana Del Rey", and described her mezzo-soprano voice as "whispery, sardonic, tearful, [and] furious". Billboard's Jason Lipshutz also compared Martinez to Del Rey and Lorde, saying, "Martinez is clearly cribbing from the dimly lit pop stylings of Lorde and Lana Del Rey, but while her wispy delivery strikes the same femme fatale poses, she lacks the subtlety of her influences", and that "Martinez is admirably ambitious, but her insistence on sticking to Cry Baby's central idea leaves her contorting into uncomfortable positions".

Martinez describes her alter ego and the protagonist of her debut album, Cry Baby, as a "fairy tale" version of herself, inspired by her own childhood and situations that she's been through combined with fictionalized, fairy tale-inspired elements. Martinez's songs are often based on personal experiences. Martinez described her own music as "very dark and honest" and "hip hop/trap inspired beats with creepy nostalgic childlike sounds such as baby pianos, music boxes, and toys".

=== Influences ===
Martinez listened to Christina Aguilera, Brandy, Britney Spears, The Beatles, Tupac Shakur, Shakira, and Biggie Smalls growing up, and wanted to be a singer from a young age. Martinez has cited The Beatles, Neutral Milk Hotel, Feist, Kimbra, Zooey Deschanel, Regina Spektor, and CocoRosie as influences of hers. Specific albums which have influenced her music include The Idler Wheel... by Fiona Apple and Ariana Grande's albums Yours Truly and My Everything. She attributes the "heavy hip-hop influence" in her music to her father playing hip-hop music in the family's house often during her childhood, and the storytelling aspect of her work to his obsession with The Beatles.

The visuals in Martinez's music videos have been influenced by her favorite visual artists: Mark Ryden, Aleksandra Waliszewska and Nicoletta Ceccoli. She named Tim Burton as a large influence of hers, showing appreciation for the prominent "cartoony childlike quality" contrasted by "dark tones lying underneath" throughout his work. She has said that to make a movie with him would be her "one dream".

== Public image ==
At age sixteen, after watching 101 Dalmatians (1996), Martinez dyed half of her hair blonde, in the same vein as Cruella de Vil. She became known for the look, as well as her "baby doll"-inspired outfits in music videos and when performing. Throughout her career, she has intentionally shown focus on the contrast between light and dark. The Guardian has called her image "doll-like and decidedly emo" with a "hyperreal persona," and described her music as "part-nursery rhyme, part tragic life story".

=== Advocacy and views ===
Martinez partnered with Love146 in 2013, hosting charity concerts and using performance proceeds to support the organization's work against child sex trafficking.

Martinez has shown support for Palestine, including displaying a Palestinian flag and a "Free Palestine. Ceasefire now" message during a 2023 concert in Paris. She was also among artists who signed an open letter calling for a ceasefire in Gaza. After her name was falsely reported to be included on a pro-Israel letter in February 2024, Martinez clarified in an Instagram comment that she is opposed to Zionism and in full support of Palestine.

=== Sexual assault allegation ===
On December 4, 2017, Timothy Heller, a woman with whom Martinez once shared a friendship, alleged via Twitter that Martinez had sexually assaulted and raped her two years prior. The following day, Martinez tweeted that she was "horrified and saddened" by the allegations and that Heller "never said no to what [they] chose to do together". On December 9, Martinez released a second statement thanking her fans for analyzing past social media posts that "reveal [Heller's] false statements", claiming she "would never be intimate with someone without their absolute consent." On December 22, Martinez released the song "Piggyback" exclusively on SoundCloud, which multiple outlets reported was a response to Heller's accusations.

On July 19, 2024, Heller issued a new video statement reasserting her story, as well as denying claims that she had "admitted to lying". Heller also described online harassment she received from Martinez's fanbase that ultimately led her to temporarily deactivate her public accounts.

== Discography ==
- Cry Baby (2015)
- K–12 (2019)
- Portals (2023)
- Hades (2026)

== Filmography ==
=== Film ===
Year	Title	Role	Notes
2019	K–12	Cry Baby	Also writer, director, costume designer, and composer
TBA	Hades	Circle	Also writer, director, costume designer, and composer

=== Television ===
Year	Title	Role	Notes
2012	The Voice	Herself / Contestant	Season 3

=== Web ===
Year	Title	Role	Notes
2019–20	Extra Credit	Herself	YouTube Premium series

== Tours ==
=== Headlining ===
- Dollhouse Tour (2014–2015)
- Cry Baby Tour (2015–2017)
- K–12 Tour (2019–2020)
- Portals Tour (2023–2024)
- The Trilogy Tour (2024)
- Hades: The Sacrifice (2026)

=== Supporting ===
- Lindsey Stirling – Music Box Tour (2015)
- Adam Lambert – The Original High Tour (2016)

== Awards and nominations ==
Award	Year	Category	Work	Result	Ref.
Alternative Press Music Awards	2017	Most Dedicated Fanbase	Herself	Nominated	
Billboard Music Awards	2020	Top Soundtrack	K–12	Nominated	
BreakTudo Awards	2020	Rising Artist	Herself	Nominated	
Clio Awards	2026	Mixed Campaign	Cry Baby	Nominated	
Hollywood Music Video Awards	2025	Best Visual Effects	"Light Shower"	Nominated	
Hollywood Music Video Awards	2025	Best Animation	"Light Shower"	Won	
MTV Video Music Awards	2023	Best Visual Effects	"Void"	Nominated	
Nickelodeon Mexico Kids' Choice Awards	2020	Challenge of the Year	"Play Date"	Nominated	
TikTok Awards Vietnam	2020	Best International Song	"Play Date"	Won	
Dabeme Music Awards	2021	Best Artist of 2014	Herself	Won	

== See also ==
- List of Puerto Ricans
