= Eric Alper =

Canadian writer (b. 1970)

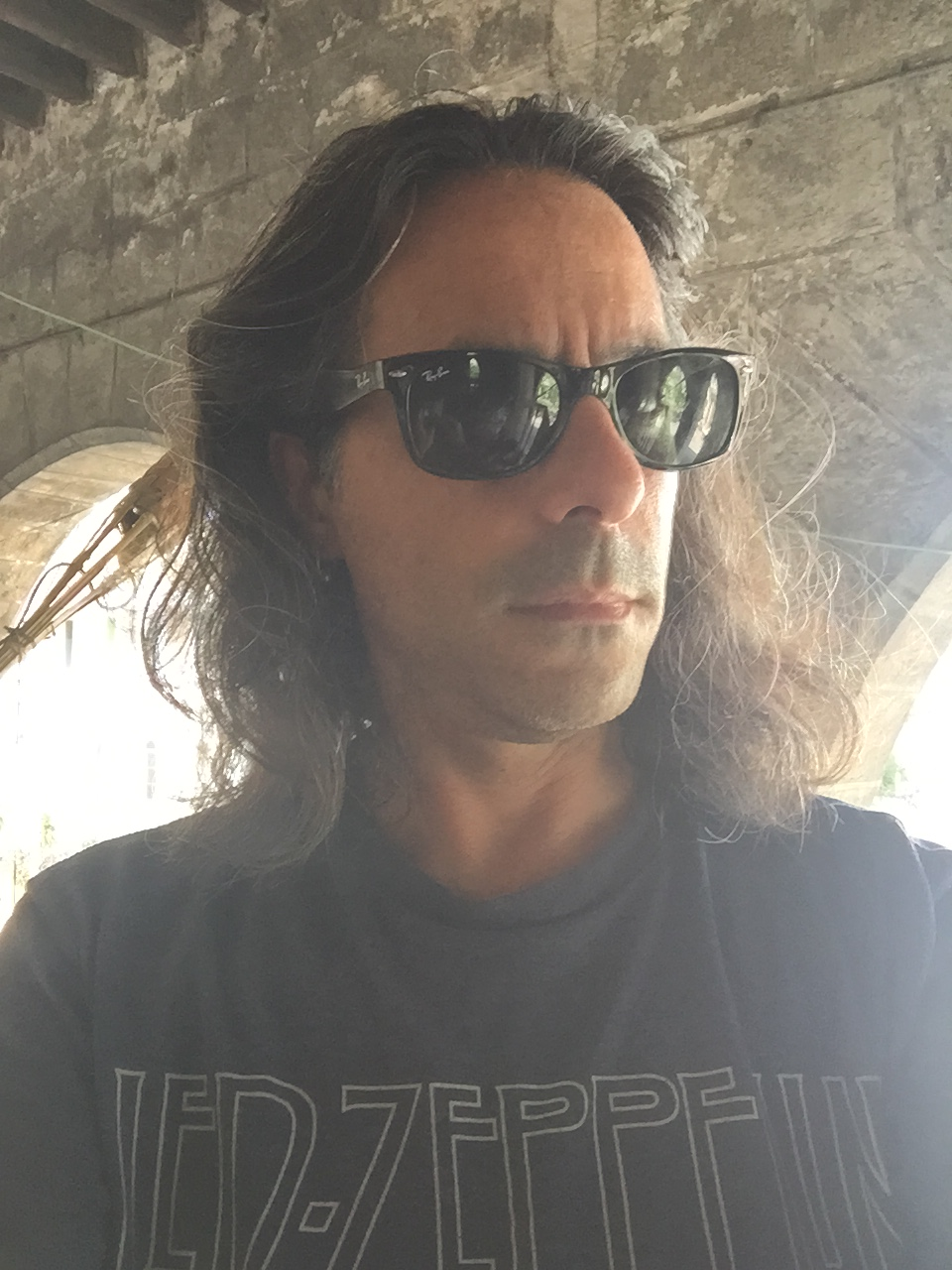
- Alper in 2016
- Born: Eric Alper; 1970 (age 55–56); Toronto, Ontario, Canada
- Occupations: Music journalist; radio host; publicist; blogger
- Years active: 1995–present
- Website: thatericalper.com

Eric Alper (born 1970) is a Canadian music journalist, publicist, blogger and radio host from Toronto. He was previously the director of media relations at eOne Music Canada in Toronto, Ontario. Since 2016, Alper has run the music PR company That Eric Alper. He hosts That Eric Alper’s Show on SiriusXM.

== Career ==
From 1998 till 2016 Alper was the director of media relations for eOne Music Canada.

He started his own PR company in 2016. He has appeared as a music correspondent on numerous Canadian television and radio networks including CTV, CBC Radio 2, and SiriusXM. He is well known for his activity on Twitter and was named on Billboard and the National Post's "Best on Twitter" lists.

== Personal life ==
Eric Alper is the father of Hannah Alper, a Canadian activist, blogger, and motivational speaker. Alper's great-grandfather Louis Grossman opened Grossman's Tavern in 1943, which was Toronto's first licensed blues bar.
