= After School (EP) =

EP by Melanie Martinez
- Released: September 25, 2020
- Recorded: June 2017 – February 2020
- Genres: Pop; alternative pop
- Length: 22:17
- Label: Atlantic
- Producers: Michael Keenan; Blake Slatkin

Melanie Martinez chronology
K–12 (2019)	After School (2020)	Portals (2023)

Singles from After School
- 1. "The Bakery" Released: September 25, 2020

After School is the fourth extended play (EP) by American singer-songwriter Melanie Martinez. It was released on September 25, 2020, through Atlantic Records. "The Bakery" was released as the lead single the same day. The EP was also released as the deluxe edition to Martinez's second studio album, K–12. Martinez says this EP is "much more personal and steps outside of the Cry Baby character box for a moment".

== Background ==
In an interview with V magazine in September 2019, Martinez stated that she (Note: Martinez uses she/her and they/them pronouns. This article uses she/her pronouns for consistency.) would release songs that were in-line with her previous album, K–12, but that the songs would be "more personal and more vulnerable". On January 8, 2020, Martinez announced through her Instagram stories that she would release an EP titled After School that would be attached to the K–12 era. The EP was originally scheduled to be released sometime in the spring of 2020. Martinez also previously announced that she had planned two more films, both of which would be accompanied by albums.

On February 9, 2020, Martinez confirmed through her Instagram story that the EP would be out in spring, but it was pushed back to September 25, and that a song featuring "one of [her] fav [sic] artists" would be coming out "sooner than you think". The next day, February 10, she released the standalone single "Copy Cat", with American rapper and songwriter Tierra Whack. The song was originally intended to be the lead single from the EP, but was cut from the final track listing.

On September 15, 2020, Martinez posted a surrealist photo on Instagram of her in a nest with two eggs, with a caption reading; "Holdin' onto these eggs till they're ready to be hatched next week", teasing that the EP would be released the next week. In an interview with Idolator, Martinez expressed interest in making a music video for "Test Me", saying that she wrote a video treatment and that "it all depends on how much people connect with it".

== Track listing ==
Standard edition
No.	Title	Writer(s)	Producer(s)	Length
1.	"Notebook"	Melanie Martinez; Michael Keenan	Michael Keenan	2:31
2.	"Test Me"	Martinez; Keenan	Keenan	2:55
3.	"Brain & Heart"	Martinez; Keenan; Rodney Jerkins; Fred Jerkins III; LaShawn Daniels; Cory Rooney; Jennifer Lopez	Keenan	3:23
4.	"Numbers"	Martinez; Keenan	Keenan	4:39
5.	"Glued"	Martinez; Keenan	Keenan	3:13
6.	"Field Trip"	Martinez; Keenan	Keenan	3:01
7.	"The Bakery"	Martinez; Blake Slatkin	Slatkin	2:34
Total length:				22:17

Notes

- "Brain & Heart" contains an interpolation of "If You Had My Love" by Jennifer Lopez, which itself contains an interpolation of "If I Gave Love" by Chanté Moore.

== Personnel ==
Musicians

- Melanie Martinez – lead vocals, songwriter (all tracks)
- Michael Keenan – songwriter, producer (tracks 1–6)
- Blake Slatkin – songwriter, producer (track 7)
- Rodney Jerkins – songwriter (track 3)
- Fred Jerkins III – songwriter (track 3)
- LaShawn Daniels – songwriter (track 3)
- Cory Rooney – songwriter (track 3)
- Jennifer Lopez – songwriter (track 3)

Technical

- Randy Merrill – mastering engineer (all tracks)
- Mitch McCarthy – mixing engineer (all tracks)

== Charts ==
After School chart performance
Chart (2020)	Peak position
Australian Albums (ARIA)	63
Belgian Albums (Ultratop Flanders)	130
Croatian International Albums (HDU)	8
UK Albums (Official Charts)	70
US Billboard 200	74
US Top Alternative Albums (Billboard)	9

== Release history ==
Release formats for After School
Region	Date	Format(s)	Label	Ref.
Various	September 25, 2020	Digital download; streaming	Atlantic	
Various	December 18, 2020	CD (Note: The CD release was available internationally, but not in the United States.); LP	Atlantic	
