= Nicoletta Ceccoli =

Italian artist

- Education: The Institute of Art in Urbino
- Website: http://www.nicolettaceccoli.com/

Nicoletta Ceccoli (born 1973) is a Sammarinese artist who is known for her richly detailed, dreamlike work.

== Life and career ==
Ceccoli was born in and lives in the Republic of San Marino and studied animation at the Institute of Art of Urbino in Italy.

She started working as an illustrator in 1995 and has illustrated many books, including Cinderella and The Girl in the Tower, written by Lisa Schroeder. Her work has been exhibited and sold internationally, with many high-profile clients such as Vogue and United Airlines.

Ceccoli was awarded the Andersen Prize, "honouring her as the best children's book illustrator in Italy", in 2001. Others prizes are Society of Illustrators of New York and four prizes for Excellence in the Communication Arts.

In 2008, she worked as the character designer for a 3D animated French film, La mécanique du cœur, under the direction of Mathias Melzieau. Ceccoli has participated in 11 group exhibitions and has had nine solo exhibitions of her work.
