= K–12 (album) =

2019 studio album and soundtrack album by Melanie Martinez

Studio album and soundtrack album by Melanie Martinez
- Released: September 6, 2019
- Recorded: 2015–2017
- Genres: Alternative pop; dark pop; art pop
- Length: 46:27
- Label: Atlantic
- Producers: Michael Keenan; One Love

Melanie Martinez chronology
Cry Baby's Extra Clutter EP (2016)	K–12 (2019)	After School (2020)

K–12 (pronounced "K through 12") is the second studio album and a soundtrack album by American singer Melanie Martinez. It was released with an accompanying film of the same name on September 6, 2019, through Atlantic Records. Martinez played the main character, "Cry Baby", in this film that she (Note: Martinez uses she/her and they/them pronouns. This article uses she/her pronouns for consistency.) wrote and directed. An alternative pop, dark pop, and art pop album, K–12 peaked at number three on the US Billboard 200. No singles preceded the album, but two promotional singles "High School Sweethearts" and "Strawberry Shortcake" were released prior to the album. The deluxe extended play (EP) After School was released a next year.

== Background and release ==
Martinez began writing her second studio album in 2015. In a 2017 interview with Billboard magazine, she said that her then-untitled second album was finished and would be accompanied by a film that she was writing and directing. In February 2019, Martinez wrote that the album "had been done for like two and a half years now", that it would likely be released at the end of summer and that no singles would be commercially released before it. Atlantic Records released the album on September 6.

On January 7, 2020, Martinez announced that she would be releasing an extended play (EP) titled After School, which is attached to K–12 (pronounced "K through 12") and would be released as the extended deluxe. She originally planned to release the project in the spring of that year, but the project ended up being released on September 25. Martinez also revealed that she had planned two more films, both of which were supposed to be accompanied by albums, but both were scrapped due to Martinez's decision to close the Cry Baby storyline, and because the projects would be too expensive to create.

== Music ==
K–12 was mostly produced by Michael Keenan, who had previously collaborated with Martinez on a few tracks on her previous album, Cry Baby. One track, "Drama Club", was co-written and produced by Martinez's frequent collaborators, Kinetics & One Love. A concept album, it has been described to be an alternative pop, dark pop, and art pop record. Martinez's website described the album's sound as "a vibrant and singular melting pot of low-key hip-hop, soulful pop and indie-leaning electro", while AllMusic's Matt Collar notes influences of hip hop and R&B.

== Promotion ==
A teaser video of Martinez in a pastel classroom was released on May 15, 2019. On May 16, she unveiled the album cover through her social media accounts. On June 18, a TV spot was released, which included a snippet of "Nurse's Office". This was followed by weekly promotions, or "assignments", beginning in late June 2019, followed by snippets usually a few hours or a day later. Despite no singles being released from the album, Martinez released snippets along with respective animated videos for every song from the album to different location hotspots called "assignments", later uploading them to her social media and YouTube accounts. On July 23, the trailer for the K–12 film was released alongside the album tracklist and pre-order. It revealed some of the plot, while a snippet of "Show & Tell" plays at the end of the trailer. It also reveals that the film would be released in select theaters for one day only on September 5. Martinez embarked on the K-12 Tour in support of the album from October to December, starting in Washington, D.C.

On September 25, 2020, Martinez released the After School EP, which was also included at the end of K–12 as a deluxe version of the album. "The Bakery" was released as the lead single from the EP, therefore becoming the first single from K-12.

=== Promotional singles ===
Prior to the announcement that "Lunchbox Friends" would be the first single from the album, Martinez pushed both "High School Sweethearts" and "Strawberry Shortcake" as promotional singles in July 2019 via vinyl release. She performed both tracks on Jimmy Kimmel Live!, alongside "Recess" on September 16, 10 days after the album release.

== Critical reception ==
Professional ratings
Review scores
Source	Rating
Albumism	4/5 stars
AllMusic	4/5 stars
Jenesaispop	4.9/10

Matt Collar of AllMusic wrote that the album is a "more sophisticated production, with better hooks showcasing Martinez's growth as a songwriter".

=== Awards and nominations ===
Award	Year	Category	Result	Ref.
Billboard Music Awards	2020	Top Soundtrack	Nominated	

== Commercial performance ==
K–12 debuted at number three on the US Billboard 200 with 57,000 album-equivalent units, of which 30,000 were pure album sales. It is Martinez's second US top 10 album. Additionally, it topped the US Top Alternative Albums chart, becoming her second consecutive top charter. Elsewhere, the album reached the top 10 of eight different countries including the UK, Australia, and Canada.

== Track listing ==
All tracks are written by Melanie Martinez and Michael Keenan, and produced by Keenan, except where noted.

Standard edition
No.	Title	Writer(s)	Producer(s)	Length
1.	"Wheels on the Bus"	Melanie Martinez; Michael Keenan; Emily Warren		3:40
2.	"Class Fight"			2:41
3.	"The Principal"			2:56
4.	"Show & Tell"			3:35
5.	"Nurse's Office"	Justin Tranter; Martinez; Keenan		3:22
6.	"Drama Club"	Martinez; Jeremy Dussolliett; Tim Sommers	One Love	3:45
7.	"Strawberry Shortcake"	Martinez; Keenan; Warren		3:04
8.	"Lunchbox Friends"			2:49
9.	"Orange Juice"			3:37
10.	"Detention"			3:56
11.	"Teacher's Pet"			4:01
12.	"High School Sweethearts"			5:11
13.	"Recess"	Martinez; Keenan; Warren		3:51
Total length:				46:27

After School – Deluxe Edition
No.	Title	Writer(s)	Producer(s)	Length
14.	"Notebook"			2:30
15.	"Test Me"			2:54
16.	"Brain & Heart"	Martinez; Keenan; Rodney Jerkins; Fred Jerkins III; LaShawn Daniels; Cory Rooney; Jennifer Lopez		3:23
17.	"Numbers"			4:39
18.	"Glued"			3:12
19.	"Field Trip"			3:00
20.	"The Bakery"	Martinez; Blake Slatkin	Slatkin	2:34
Total length:				67:19

=== Notes ===
- The song "Fire Drill" appears during the end credits, but is not included in the album.
- "Wheels on the Bus" samples a children's song "The Wheels on the Bus" written by Verna Hills.
- "Brain & Heart" contains an interpolation of "If You Had My Love" by Jennifer Lopez.
- "Fire Drill" samples a children's song "Do Your Ears Hang Low?" written by George Washington Dixon

== Charts ==
=== Weekly charts ===
Weekly chart performance
Chart (2019)	Peak position
Australian Albums (ARIA)	6
Austrian Albums (Ö3 Austria)	33
Belgian Albums (Ultratop Flanders)	15
Belgian Albums (Ultratop Wallonia)	65
Canadian Albums (Billboard)	10
Czech Albums (ČNS IFPI)	71
Dutch Albums (Album Top 100)	8
Estonian Albums (Eesti Ekspress)	9
Finnish Albums (Suomen virallinen lista)	20
French Albums (SNEP)	81
German Albums (Offizielle Top 100)	27
Hungarian Albums (MAHASZ)	23
Irish Albums (IRMA)	7
Italian Albums (FIMI)	11
Latvian Albums (LAIPA)	9
Lithuanian Albums (AGATA)	4
Mexican Albums (AMPROFON)	4
New Zealand Albums (RMNZ)	8
Norwegian Albums (VG-lista)	18
Polish Albums (ZPAV)	10
Portuguese Albums (AFP)	2
Scottish Albums (Official Charts)	8
Spanish Albums (Promusicae)	6
Swedish Albums (Sverigetopplistan)	32
Swiss Albums (Schweizer Hitparade)	26
UK Albums (Official Charts)	8
US Billboard 200	3
US Top Alternative Albums (Billboard)	1
US Top Soundtracks (Billboard)	1
US Indie Store Album Sales (Billboard)	13

Weekly chart performance
Chart (2023–2024)	Peak position
Croatian International Albums (HDU)	12
US Top Rock & Alternative Albums (Billboard)	48

=== Year-end charts ===
2019 year-end chart performance
Chart (2019)	Position
Mexican Albums (AMPROFON)	93
US Soundtrack Albums (Billboard)	16

2020 year-end chart performance
Chart (2020)	Position
US Soundtrack Albums (Billboard)	8

2021 year-end chart performance
Chart (2021)	Position
US Soundtrack Albums (Billboard)	10

2022 year-end chart performance
Chart (2022)	Position
US Soundtrack Albums (Billboard)	13

2023 year-end chart performance
Chart (2023)	Position
US Soundtrack Albums (Billboard)	12

2024 year-end chart performance
Chart (2024)	Position
US Soundtrack Albums (Billboard)	9

== Certifications ==
Certifications and sales
Region	Certification	Certified units/sales
Canada (Music Canada)	Platinum	80,000^{‡}
New Zealand (RMNZ)	Gold	7,500^{‡}
United Kingdom (BPI)	Gold	100,000^{‡}
United States (RIAA)	Platinum	1,000,000^{‡}
^{‡} Sales+streaming figures based on certification alone.

== Release history ==
Release history and formats
Region	Date	Version	Format(s)	Label	Ref.
Various	September 6, 2019	Standard	Cassette; CD; CD/DVD; digital download; LP; streaming	Atlantic	
Various	September 25, 2020	After School – Deluxe Edition	Digital download; streaming	Atlantic	
