= Public Enemy discography =

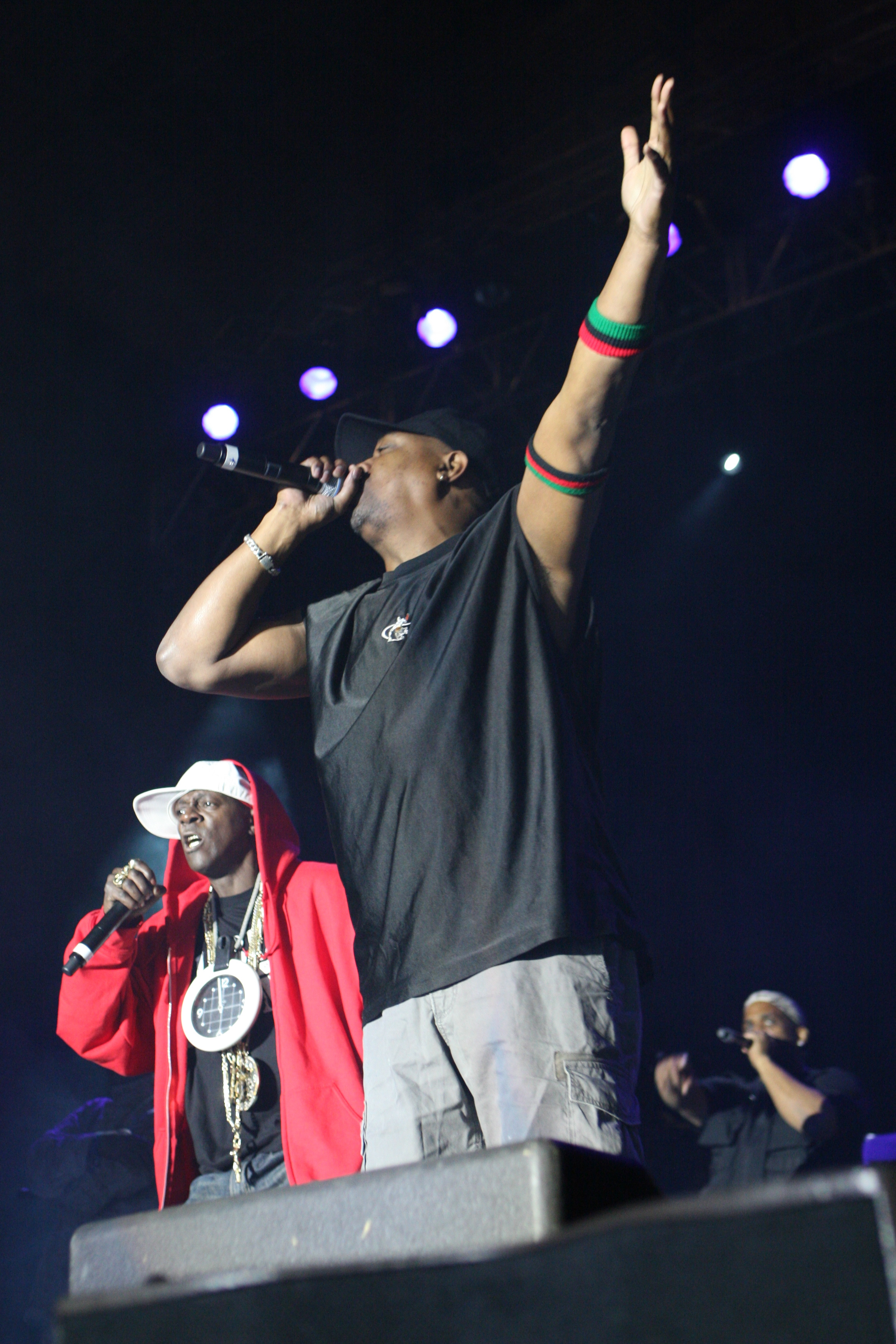
- Public Enemy at San Miguel Primavera Sound 2008
- Studio albums: 16
- Soundtrack albums: 1
- Live albums: 2
- Compilation albums: 4
- Singles: 42
- Video albums: 4
- Music videos: 41
- Remix albums: 2
- Promotional singles: 4

The discography of Public Enemy, an American hip-hop group, consists of 16 studio albums, two live albums, four compilation albums, two remix albums, one soundtrack album, four video albums, 42 singles, four promotional singles and 39 music videos. The group released their debut studio album, Yo! Bum Rush the Show, in March 1987; it peaked at number 125 on the United States Billboard 200. The album spawned the singles "Public Enemy No. 1" and "You're Gonna Get Yours". Public Enemy released their second studio album, It Takes a Nation of Millions to Hold Us Back, in April 1988. The album peaked at number 42 on the Billboard 200. It has since sold 1.3 million copies in the US, earning a platinum certification from the Recording Industry Association of America (RIAA). Four of the album's singles charted on the US Billboard Hot R&B/Hip-Hop Songs chart: "Bring the Noise", "Don't Believe the Hype", "Night of the Living Baseheads" and "Black Steel in the Hour of Chaos". The former three, along with the single "Rebel Without a Pause", also charted in the United Kingdom.

Fear of a Black Planet, the group's third studio album, was released in April 1990. The album peaked at number 10 on the Billboard 200, with first-week sales of one million copies. Fear of a Black Planet also charted in countries such as Australia, Canada and New Zealand. The album spawned five singles; "Fight the Power" and "911 Is a Joke" both topped the US Billboard Hot Rap Songs chart and charted in countries such as the Netherlands and the UK. "Welcome to the Terrordome", "Brothers Gonna Work It Out" and "Can't Do Nuttin' for Ya Man" all became top 25 hits on the Hot Rap Songs chart and top 40 hits in New Zealand. The group's fourth studio album, Apocalypse 91... The Enemy Strikes Black, was released in October 1991. The album peaked at number four on the Billboard 200; its first single, "Can't Truss It", peaked at number 50 on the US Billboard Hot 100 and gave the band their first hit on the chart. Muse Sick-n-Hour Mess Age followed in August 1994, peaking at number 14 on the Billboard 200. The album's lead single "Give It Up" peaked at number 33 on the Hot 100, becoming the group's most commercially successful single in the United States. In 1998, the group recorded the soundtrack for the film He Got Game. The film's soundtrack album peaked at number 26 on the Billboard 200 and spawned the commercially successful single "He Got Game".

Following a shift of labels from Def Jam Records to Atomic Pop, the group released There's a Poison Goin' On, their sixth studio album. The album only managed to find success in the United Kingdom, where it peaked at number 55 and its only single, "Do You Wanna Go Our Way???", peaked at number 66. Public Enemy then signed to Koch Records, releasing Revolverlution in July 2002. Revolverlution peaked at number 110 on the Billboard 200 and has sold 71,000 copies in the US. The group collaborated with American rapper Paris on their ninth studio album, Rebirth of a Nation, which was released on Paris' own Guerrilla Funk label; it peaked at number 180 on the Billboard 200. How You Sell Soul to a Soulless People Who Sold Their Soul? followed in August 2007 and spawned three singles. "Harder Than You Think", the album's third single, peaked at number 4 in the UK; it became the group's first top ten single in the country. In 2012, the group released two studio albums: Most of My Heroes Still Don't Appear on No Stamp in July and The Evil Empire of Everything in October. In July 2015, the group released Man Plans God Laughs. The group's thirteenth album, Nothing Is Quick in the Desert, was released in 2017 as a surprise release. The album was available for free download through Bandcamp until July 4, 2017.In 2020, the group (minus Flavor Flav) under the name Enemy Radio released their fourteenth album, Loud Is Not Enough. That album was followed by 2020's What You Gonna Do When the Grid Goes Down? which featured a returning Flavor Flav. On June 27, 2025, the group surprise released their sixteenth album, Black Sky Over The Projects: Apartment 2025 as an exclusive to Bandcamp where fans for the first 72 hours after the release can set their own price when purchasing the album.

== Albums ==
=== Studio albums ===
List of studio albums, with selected chart positions, sales figures and certifications
Title	Album details	Peak chart positions										Sales	Certifications
Title	Album details	US	US R&B	AUS	CAN	GER	NLD	NZ	SWE	SWI	UK	Sales	Certifications
Yo! Bum Rush the Show	Released: March 1987 (US); Label: Def Jam; Formats: CD, CS, LP	125	28	—	—	—	—	—	—	—	—	US: 400,000	RIAA: Gold
It Takes a Nation of Millions to Hold Us Back	Released: June 28, 1988 (US); Label: Def Jam; Formats: CD, CS, LP	42	1	—	93	—	40	—	—	—	8	US: 1,300,000	RIAA: Platinum; BPI: Gold
Fear of a Black Planet	Released: April 10, 1990 (US); Label: Def Jam; Formats: CD, CS, LP	10	3	30	15	30	17	15	24	19	4	US: 1,300,000	RIAA: Platinum; BPI: Gold; MC: Gold
Apocalypse 91... The Enemy Strikes Black	Released: October 1, 1991 (US); Label: Def Jam; Formats: CD, CS, LP	4	1	11	12	38	62	5	36	33	8	US: 1,000,000	RIAA: Platinum; BPI: Silver; MC: Gold
Muse Sick-n-Hour Mess Age	Released: August 23, 1994 (US); Label: Def Jam; Formats: CD, CS, LP	14	4	16	20	25	39	7	20	22	12	US: 500,000	RIAA: Gold
There's a Poison Goin' On	Released: July 20, 1999 (US); Label: Atomic Pop; Formats: CD, CS, LP, digital download	—	—	—	—	66	—	—	—	—	55		
Revolverlution	Released: July 23, 2002 (US); Label: Koch; Formats: CD, LP, digital download	110	16	—	—	—	—	—	—	—	—	US: 71,000	
New Whirl Odor	Released: November 1, 2005 (US); Label: Slam Jamz; Formats: CD, LP, digital download	—	—	—	—	—	—	—	—	—	—		
Rebirth of a Nation (featuring Paris)	Released: March 7, 2006 (US); Label: Guerrilla Funk; Formats: CD, LP, digital download	180	54	—	—	—	—	—	—	—	—		
How You Sell Soul to a Soulless People Who Sold Their Soul???	Released: August 7, 2007 (US); Label: Slam Jamz; Formats: CD, LP, digital download	—	—	—	—	—	—	—	—	—	199		
Most of My Heroes Still Don't Appear on No Stamp	Released: July 13, 2012 (US); Label: Slam Jamz; Formats: CD, LP, digital download	—	—	—	—	—	—	—	—	—	—		
The Evil Empire of Everything	Released: October 1, 2012 (US); Label: Enemy; Formats: CD, LP, digital download	—	—	—	—	—	—	—	—	—	—		
Man Plans God Laughs	Released: July 27, 2015 (US); Label: RCS Music; Formats: CD, LP, digital download	—	—	—	—	—	—	—	—	—	—		
Nothing Is Quick in the Desert	Released: June 29, 2017 (US); Label: 916% Entertainment; Formats: Digital download	—	—	—	—	—	—	—	—	—	—		
Loud Is Not Enough (released under the name Enemy Radio)	Released: April 1, 2020; Label: SpitSLAM Records; Formats: Digital download, streaming	—	—	—	—	—	—	—	—	—	—		
What You Gonna Do When the Grid Goes Down?	Released: September 25, 2020; Label: Def Jam; Formats: Digital download, streaming	—	—	—	—	81	—	—	—	37	100		
Black Sky Over the Projects: Apartment 2025	Released: June 27, 2025; Label: Enemy Records; Formats: Digital download, streaming, CD, vinyl	—	—	—	—	—	—	—	—	—			
"—" denotes a recording that did not chart or was not released in that territory.

=== Live albums ===
List of live albums
Title	Album details
It Takes a Nation: The First London Invasion Tour 1987	Released: May 17, 2005 (US); Label: Slam Jamz; Formats: CD
MKL VF KWR – Revolverlution Tour Manchester UK 2003	Released: 2006 (US); Label: SPV Recordings; Formats: CD, DVD
Fight the Power: Greatest Hits Live!	Released: February 6, 2007 (US); Label: Titan/Pyramid; Formats: CD, digital download

=== Compilation albums ===
List of compilation albums, with selected chart positions and certifications
Title	Album details	Peak chart positions							Certifications
Title	Album details	US	US R&B	AUS	NLD	NZ	SWE	UK	Certifications
Greatest Misses	Released: September 15, 1992 (US); Label: Def Jam; Formats: CD, CS, LP	13	10	57	72	15	30	15	RIAA: Gold
20th Century Masters – The Millennium Collection: The Best of Public Enemy	Released: June 19, 2001 (US); Label: Universal; Formats: CD, digital download	—	—	—	—	—	—	—	
Power to the People and the Beats: Public Enemy's Greatest Hits	Released: August 2, 2005 (US); Label: Def Jam; Formats: CD, LP, digital download	69	26	—	—	—	—	39	BPI: Silver
Planet Earth: The Rock and Roll Hall of Fame Greatest Rap Hits	Released: April 22, 2013; Label: Weinerworld; Formats: CD, digital download, vinyl, picture disc vinyl	—	—	—	—	—	—	—	
"—" denotes a recording that did not chart or was not released in that territory.

=== Remix albums ===
List of remix albums
Title	Album details
Bring That Beat Back	Released: September 5, 2006 (US); Label: Koch; Formats: CD, digital download
Remix of a Nation (featuring Paris)	Released: November 6, 2007 (US); Label: Guerrilla Funk; Formats: CD, digital download

=== Soundtrack albums ===
List of soundtrack albums, with selected chart positions
Title	Album details	Peak chart positions						
Title	Album details	US	US R&B	AUS	CAN	GER	NLD	UK
He Got Game	Released: April 21, 1998 (US); Label: Def Jam; Formats: CD, CS, LP	26	10	54	35	81	98	50

=== Video albums ===
List of video albums, with selected chart positions
Title	Album details	Peak chart positions
Title	Album details	US Video
Fight the Power... Live!	Released: 1989 (US); Label: Def Jam; Formats: VHS	5
Tour of a Black Planet	Released: 1991 (US); Label: Def Jam; Formats: VHS	8
The Enemy Strikes Live	Released: 1992 (US); Label: Def Jam; Formats: VHS	25
It Takes a Nation: The First London Invasion Tour 1987	Released: May 17, 2005 (US); Label: Slam Jamz; Formats: DVD	—
"—" denotes a recording that did not chart or was not released in that territory.

== Singles ==
List of singles, with selected chart positions and certifications, showing year released and album name
Title	Year	Peak chart positions										Certifications	Album
Title	Year	US	US Dance	US R&B	US Rap	AUS	FRA	NLD	NZ	SWI	UK	Certifications	Album
"Public Enemy No. 1"	1987	—	—	—	—	68	—	—	—	—	—		Yo! Bum Rush the Show
"You're Gonna Get Yours"	1987	—	—	—	—	—	—	—	—	—	88		Yo! Bum Rush the Show
"Rebel Without a Pause"	1987	—	—	—	—	—	—	—	—	—	37		It Takes a Nation of Millions to Hold Us Back
"Bring the Noise"	1987	—	—	56	—	—	—	—	—	—	32		Less than Zero (soundtrack) / It Takes a Nation of Millions to Hold Us Back
"Don't Believe the Hype"	1988	—	21	18	—	—	—	—	46	—	18		It Takes a Nation of Millions to Hold Us Back
"Night of the Living Baseheads"	1988	—	—	62	—	—	—	—	21	—	63		It Takes a Nation of Millions to Hold Us Back
"Black Steel in the Hour of Chaos"	1989	—	—	86	11	—	—	—	—	—	—		It Takes a Nation of Millions to Hold Us Back
"Fight the Power"	1989	—	—	20	1	—	—	24	—	—	29		Do the Right Thing (soundtrack) / Fear of a Black Planet
"Welcome to the Terrordome"	1990	—	49	15	3	81	—	21	12	—	18		Fear of a Black Planet
"Brothers Gonna Work It Out"	1990	—	31	20	22	95	—	—	30	—	46		Fear of a Black Planet
"911 Is a Joke"	1990	34^{[B]}	—	15	1	64	—	71	22	25	41		Fear of a Black Planet
"Can't Do Nuttin' for Ya Man"	1990	—	—	—	11	59	—	—	15	—	53		House Party (soundtrack) / Fear of a Black Planet
"Can't Truss It"	1991	50	5	11	1	55	—	—	24	—	22	RIAA: Gold	Apocalypse 91... The Enemy Strikes Black
"Shut 'Em Down"	1991	—	16	26	1	161	—	—	30	—	21		Apocalypse 91... The Enemy Strikes Black
"Nighttrain"	1992	—	—	—	17	168	—	—	42	—	55		Apocalypse 91... The Enemy Strikes Black
"Hazy Shade of Criminal"	1992	—	—	58	12	116	—	—	27	—	—		Greatest Misses
"Louder Than a Bomb (JMJ Tapmaster Groove Remix)"	1992	—	—	—	—	—	—	—	—	—	—		Greatest Misses
"I Stand Accused"^{[A]}	1993	—	—	—	—	—	—	—	—	—	77		Muse Sick-n-Hour Mess Age
"Give It Up"	1994	33	—	30	5	16	36	36	14	37	18		Muse Sick-n-Hour Mess Age
"What Kind of Power We Got?"^{[A]}	1994	—	—	—	—	—	—	—	—	—	77		Muse Sick-n-Hour Mess Age
"So Whatcha Gonna Do Now?"	1995	—	—	—	—	—	—	—	—	—	50		Muse Sick-n-Hour Mess Age
"He Got Game" (featuring Stephen Stills)	1998	105	—	78	—	25	82	54	7	—	16		He Got Game (soundtrack)
"Resurrection" (featuring Masta Killa)	1998	—	—	—	—	—	—	—	—	—	—		He Got Game (soundtrack)
"Shake Your Booty"	1998	—	—	—	—	66	—	—	—	—	—		He Got Game (soundtrack)
"Do You Wanna Go Our Way???"	1999	—	—	—	—	—	—	—	—	—	66		There's a Poison Goin' On'
"Give the Peeps What They Need"	2002	—	—	—	—	—	—	—	—	—	—		Revolverlution
"Son of a Bush"	2003	—	—	—	—	—	—	—	—	—	—		Revolverlution
"Make Love Fuck War" (with Moby)	2004	—	—	—	—	—	—	—	—	—	—		New Whirl Odor
"Bring That Beat Back"	2005	—	—	—	—	—	—	—	—	—	—		New Whirl Odor
"Can't Hold Us Back" (featuring Paris, Dead Prez and Kam)	2005	—	—	—	—	—	—	—	—	—	—		Rebirth of a Nation
"Hell No We Ain't All Right!" (featuring Paris)	2005	—	—	—	—	—	—	—	—	—	—		Rebirth of a Nation
"Ali Rap Theme"	2006	—	—	—	—	—	—	—	—	—	—		Non-album single
"Amerikan Gangster" (featuring E.Infinite)	2007	—	—	—	—	—	—	—	—	—	—		How You Sell Soul to a Soulless People Who Sold Their Soul?
"Black Is Back"	2007	—	—	—	—	—	—	—	—	—	—		How You Sell Soul to a Soulless People Who Sold Their Soul?
"Harder Than You Think"	2007	—	—	—	—	—	—	—	—	—	4	BPI: Platinum	How You Sell Soul to a Soulless People Who Sold Their Soul?
"Rise"	2008	—	—	—	—	—	—	—	—	—	—		Rebirth of a Nation
"They Call Me Flavor" (featuring Paris)	2008	—	—	—	—	—	—	—	—	—	—		Rebirth of a Nation
"Say It Like It Really Is"	2010	—	—	—	—	—	—	—	—	—	—		The Evil Empire of Everything
"I Shall Not Be Moved"	2012	—	—	—	—	—	—	—	—	—	—		Most of My Heroes Still Don't Appear on No Stamp
"Man Plans God Laughs"	2015	—	—	—	—	—	—	—	—	—	—		Man Plans God Laughs
"State of the Union (STFU)" (featuring DJ Premier)	2020	—	—	—	—	—	—	—	—	—	—		What You Gonna Do When the Grid Goes Down?
"Fight the Power: Remix 2020" (featuring Nas, Rapsody, Black Thought, Jahi, YG and Questlove)	2020	—	—	—	—	—	—	—	—	—	—		What You Gonna Do When the Grid Goes Down?
"March Madness"	2025	—	—	—	—	—	—	—	—	—	—		Black Sky Over the Projects: Apartment 2025
"—" denotes a recording that did not chart or was not released in that territory.

=== Promotional singles ===
List of promotional singles, showing year released and album name
Title	Year	Album
"Anti-Nigger Machine"	1990	Fear of a Black Planet
"By the Time I Get to Arizona"	1991	Apocalypse 91... The Enemy Strikes Black

== Other appearances ==
List of non-single guest appearances, with other performing artists, showing year released and album name
Title	Year	Other artist(s)	Album
"Funny Vibe"	1988	Living Colour	Vivid
"Tweakin'"	1989	George Clinton	The Cinderella Theory
"Self-Destruciton"	1989	Stop the Violence Movement	12"
"Get Off My Back"	1992	—N/a	Mo' Money (soundtrack) / Greatest Misses
"Gotta Do What I Gotta Do"	1992	—N/a	Trespass (soundtrack) / Greatest Misses
"Livin' in a Zoo"	1993	—N/a	CB4 (soundtrack)
"Paint the White House Black"	1993	George Clinton, Pupa Curly, MC Breed, Kam, Yo-Yo, Shock G, Ice Cube & Dr. Dre	Hey, Man, Smell My Finger
"Kill Em Live"	1998	none	Bulworth (soundtrack)
"Freeze the Frame"	2000	DJ Hurricane, Money Mark	Don't Sleep

== Music videos ==
List of music videos, showing year released and director
Title	Year	Director(s)	
"Bring the Noise"	1987	Dominic Savage	
"Rebel Without a Pause"	1987	—N/a	
"Don't Believe the Hype"	1988	—N/a	
"Night of the Living Baseheads"	1988	Lionel C. Martin	
"Black Steel in the Hour of Chaos"	1989	Adam Bernstein	
"Fight the Power"	1989	Spike Lee	
"Fight the Power" (film clip version)	1989	Spike Lee	
"Welcome to the Terrordome"	1990	—N/a	
"Brothers Gonna Work It Out"	1990	Lionel C. Martin	
"911 Is a Joke"	1990	—N/a	
"Can't Do Nuttin' for Ya Man"	1990	—N/a	
"Burn Hollywood Burn" (featuring Big Daddy Kane and Ice Cube)	1990	Lionel C. Martin	
"Bring the Noize" (Anthrax Version)	1991		
"Can't Truss It"	1991	Eric Meza	
"Shut 'Em Down"	1992	—N/a	
"Nighttrain"	1992	Christopher B. Stokes	
"Hazy Shade of Criminal"	1992	Eric Meza	
"By the Time I Get to Arizona"	1992	Eric Meza	
"Louder Than a Bomb" (JMJ Tapmaster Groove Remix)	1992	Brett Ratner	
"I Stand Accused"	1994	Steve Carr	
"Give It Up"	1994	Chris Gilligan	
"What Kind of Power We Got?"	1994	Eric Meza	
"So Whatcha Gonna Do Now?"	1995	Joseph Kahn	
"He Got Game" (featuring Stephen Stills)	1998	Spike Lee	
"Do You Wanna Go Our Way???"	1999	Jonathon Woods, Christopher Adams	
"Gotta Give the Peeps What They Need"	2002	—N/a	
"Revolverlution"	2002	—N/a	
"Son of a Bush"	2002	Memo Salazar	
"Make Love Fuck War" (with Moby)	2004	Giles Bury	
"Bring That Beat Back"	2005	—N/a	
"Revolution"	2006	—N/a	
"Superman's Black in the Building"	2006	David C. Snyder	
"Black Is Back"	2007	David C. Snyder	
"Long and Whining Road"	2007	David C. Snyder	
"Harder Than You Think"	2007	David C. Snyder	
"I Woke Up in a Place I Forgot" {There's a Poison Goin' On}	2008	—N/a	
"Prophets of Rage" {It Takes a Nation of Millions to Hold Us Back}	2008	—N/a	
"Rebirth" {Apocalypse 91... The Enemy Strikes Black}	2008	—N/a	
"Welcome to the Terrordome (Fear 2011)" {Fear of a Black Planet}	2010	—N/a	
"Say It Like It Really Is"	2010	—N/a	
"I Shall Not Be Moved"	2012	David C. Snyder	
"RLTK" (featuring D.M.C.)	2012	David C. Snyder	
"Harder Than You Think" (Dehasse Radio Edit)	2012	David C. Snyder	
"Everything"	2013	David C. Snyder	
"Get Up Stand Up" (featuring Brother Ali)	2013	David C. Snyder	
"Hoover Music"	2013	—N/a	
"Man Plans God Laughs"	2015	—N/a	
"No Sympathy From the Devil"	2015	—N/a	
"Mine Again"	2015	—N/a	
"Lost in Space Music"	2015	—N/a	
"Me to We"	2015	—N/a	Lionel C. Martin
"Honky Talk Rules"	2016	—N/a	
"State of the Union (STFU)" (feat. DJ Premier)	2020	David C. Snyder	
"Fight the Power (2020)" (featuring Nas, Rapsody, Black Thought, Jahi, YG & Questlove)	2020		
"Grid" (featuring George Clinton and Cypress Hill)	2020		

== Notes ==
- A "I Stand Accused" and "What Kind of Power We Got?" charted as a double A-side single in the United Kingdom.
- B "911 Is A Joke" charted #34 on Billboard's Hot 100 Singles Sales chart, and it was the first sales-only chart hit.
