= Power to the People and the Beats: Public Enemy's Greatest Hits =

Greatest hits album by Public Enemy
- Released: August 2, 2005
- Genres: Hip hop; East Coast hip hop; hardcore hip hop; political hip hop
- Length: 77 minutes
- Label: Def Jam
- Producers: Chuck D; The Bomb Squad; Cerwin Depper; Gary G-Wiz; Imperial Grand Ministers Of Funk; Spike Lee; Kathy Nelson; D.R. Period; Stuart Robertz; Rick Rubin; Carl Ryder; Hank Shocklee, Keith Shocklee

Public Enemy chronology
Revolverlution (2002)	Power to the People and the Beats: Public Enemy's Greatest Hits (2005)	New Whirl Odor (2005)

Power to the People and the Beats is a greatest hits album by hip hop group Public Enemy.

== Album information ==
The collection represents the group's output during its first tenure on Def Jam.

The planned Power to the People and the Videos release was delayed because of legal issues with Universal Music.

== Reception ==
Professional ratings
Review scores
Source	Rating
AllMusic	4.5/5 stars
Pitchfork Media	9.4/10
The Rolling Stone Album Guide	3.5/5 stars

Uncut (p. 130) – 4 stars out of 5 – "PE harnessed the power of chaos and rage more effectively than any punk or speed-metal merchant, were more articulate in their anger than any folk singer, were as righteous as any roots reggae or gospel singer."

Mojo (p. 132) – 4 stars out of 5 – "[With] squealing, clashing samples..."

== Track listing ==
=== CD version ===
1. "You're Gonna Get Yours" (C. Ridenhour, H. Shocklee) (from Yo! Bum Rush The Show) – 4:05
2. "Public Enemy No. 1" (C. Ridenhour, H. Shocklee) (from Yo! Bum Rush The Show) – 4:41
3. "Rebel Without a Pause" (Vocal Version) (C. Ridenhour, H. Shocklee, E. Sadler, N. Rogers) (from It Takes a Nation of Millions to Hold Us Back) – 4:18
4. "Bring the Noise" (C. Ridenhour, H. Shocklee, E. Sadler) (from It Takes a Nation of Millions to Hold Us Back) – 3:47
5. "Don't Believe the Hype" (C. Ridenhour, E. Sadler, H. Shocklee, W. Drayton) (from It Takes a Nation of Millions to Hold Us Back) – 5:19
6. "Prophets of Rage" (C. Ridenhour, H. Shocklee, E. Sadler) (from It Takes a Nation of Millions to Hold Us Back) – 3:20
7. "Black Steel in the Hour of Chaos" (Single Edit) (C. Ridenhour, H. Shocklee, E. Sadler, W. Drayton) (from It Takes a Nation of Millions to Hold Us Back) – 3:43
8. "Fight the Power" (K. Shocklee, E. Sadler, C. Ridenhour) (from Fear of a Black Planet) – 4:36
9. "Welcome to the Terrordome" (K. Shocklee, E. Sadler, C. Ridenhour) (from Fear of a Black Planet) – 5:26
10. "911 Is a Joke" (W. Drayton, K. Shocklee, E. Sadler) (from Fear of a Black Planet) – 3:17
11. "Brothers Gonna Work It Out" (K. Shocklee, E. Sadler, C. Ridenhour) (from Fear of a Black Planet) – 5:08
12. "Can't Do Nuttin' for Ya Man" (H. Shocklee, E. Sadler, C. Ridenhour) (from Fear of a Black Planet) – 2:47
13. "Can't Truss It" (C. Ridenhour, S. Robertz, Gary G-Wiz, C. Depper) (from Apocalypse 91... The Enemy Strikes Black) – 4:52
14. "Shut Em Down" (C. Ridenhour, S. Robertz, Gary G-Wiz, C. Depper) (from Apocalypse 91... The Enemy Strikes Black) – 4:19
15. "By the Time I Get to Arizona" (C. Ridenhour, S. Robertz, Gary G-Wiz, C. Depper, Mandrill, Santiago) (from Apocalypse 91... The Enemy Strikes Black) – 4:00
16. "Hazy Shade of Criminal" (C. Ridenhour, W. Drayton, The JBL, S. Robertz, Gary G-Wiz) (from Greatest Misses) – 4:50
17. "Give It Up" (Gary G-Wiz, C. Ridenhour, Studdah Man, A. Isbell, M. Thomas) (from Muse Sick-N-Hour Mess Age) – 4:43
18. "He Got Game" (C. Ridenhour, L. Leap, S. Stills) (from He Got Game) 4:45

=== Vinyl version ===
A1. "Rebel Without a Pause" (from It Takes a Nation of Millions to Hold Us Back) – 4:18
A2. "Bring the Noise" (from It Takes a Nation of Millions to Hold Us Back) – 3:47
B1. "Don't Believe the Hype" (from It Takes a Nation of Millions to Hold Us Back) – 5:19
B2. "Night of the Living Baseheads" (from It Takes a Nation of Millions to Hold Us Back) – 3:14
C1. "Fight the Power" (from Fear of a Black Planet) – 4:36
C2. "911 Is a Joke" (from Fear of a Black Planet) – 3:17
D1. "Welcome to the Terrordome" (from Fear of a Black Planet) – 5:26
E1. "Brothers Gonna Work It Out" (from Fear of a Black Planet) – 5:08
E2. "Can't Do Nuttin' for Ya Man" (from Fear of a Black Planet) – 2:47
F1. "Can't Truss It" (from Apocalypse 91... The Enemy Strikes Black) – 4:52
G1. "Shut Em Down" (from Apocalypse 91... The Enemy Strikes Black) – 4:19
G2. "Shut Em Down" [Pete Rock Mixx] (from Apocalypse 91... The Enemy Strikes Black)
H1. "Nighttrain" (from Apocalypse 91... The Enemy Strikes Black)
I1. "Give It Up" (from Muse Sick-N-Hour Mess Age) – 4:43
I2. "So Watcha Gonna Do Now" (from Muse Sick-N-Hour Mess Age)
J1. "He Got Game" (from He Got Game) – 4:45

== Certifications ==
Region	Certification	Certified units/sales
United Kingdom (BPI)	Silver	60,000^{*}
^{*} Sales figures based on certification alone.
