= Bring the Noise 2000 =

Remix album by Public Enemy
- Released: Unreleased
- Genre: Hip hop; industrial

Professional ratings
Review scores
Source	Rating
AllMusic	3/5 stars

Bring the Noise 2000 is an unreleased industrial remix album of Public Enemy tracks produced by Spacey B and George "Cornbread" Marshall, following their 1998 He Got Game album. The group's attempt to make it available to fans online was blocked by their record distributor, PolyGram. This action resulted in the group's departure from that label and Def Jam, with whom Public Enemy had made music history in the late 1980s. The group's next album, There's a Poison Goin' On was released on the independent label Atomic Pop.

== Track list ==
1. "There Were More Hype Believers Than Ever in '97" – 5:39
2. "Welcome to the Terrordome" (X-games remix) – 5:44
3. "Bring the Noise" – 1:59
4. "You're Gonna Get Yours" – 0:55
5. "Whole Lotta Love Going On in the Middle of Hell" – 1:33
6. "Don't Believe the Hype" – 2:01
7. "How to Kill a Radio Consultant" – 1:28
8. "Night of the Living Baseheads" – 0:57
9. "Cold Lampin'" – 1:18
10. "Move!" – 2:20
11. "Welcome to the Terrordome" – 3:05
12. "What Side You On?" – 1:07
13. "Hazy Shade of Criminal" – 1:40
14. "Buck Whylin'" – 1:07
15. "Yo! Bum Rush the Show" – 1:29
16. "911 Is a Joke" – 1:33
17. "Louder Than a Bomb" – 0:50
18. "Rebel Without a Pause" – 1:21
19. "G'Damn That DJ Made My Day" – 1:05
20. "Son of Public Enemy" – 0:32
21. "Burn Hollywood Burn" – 1:16
22. "Incident at 66.6 FM" – 1:32
23. "Live and Undrugged" – 1:59
24. "She Watch Channel Zero?!?!" – 2:30
25. "Fight the Power" – 2:52
26. "Mind Deep" – 5:09
27. "Mind Deep" (instrumental) – 4:40
