= Khari Wynn =

American guitarist (born 1981)

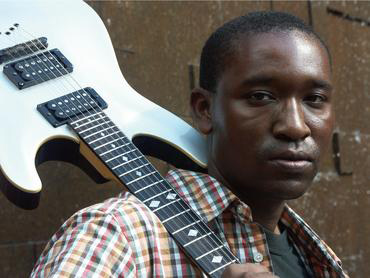

Background information
- Genres: Hard rock, blues-rock, blues, jazz, jazz fusion
- Occupation: Musician
- Instrument: Electric guitar
- Years active: 2000–present
- Label: SlamJamz
- Formerly of: Public Enemy, Solstice

Khari James Wynn (born November 23, 1981) is an American guitarist and recording artist from Memphis, Tennessee.

He is best known for his work the jazz-rock genre as well as with American hip hop group, Public Enemy.

== Early life ==
Khari Wynn was born in Boston, Massachusetts, son of acclaimed music critic/writer Ron Wynn. He was considered a musical prodigy and possessed and exhibited innate natural musical ability. As a child, Wynn lived directly across the street from Willie Mitchell's Royal Studios. At the age of fourteen he began to play electric guitar in the Memphis area for Dominion and Crashpattern in the metal genre, and for St. Andrews AME Church in the gospel genre. Wynn entered the 1999 National Jimi Hendrix Competition at B.B. Kings in Memphis, TN and placed second with the song "Have You Ever Been To Electric Ladyland".

== Career ==
At the age of eighteen, Khari Wynn was employed by Carnival Cruise Lines as a staff musician.

In 2001 Wynn began recording and rehearsing with 7th Octave, a group assembled by Professor Griff of Public Enemy. The following year, Wynn wrote and recorded electric guitar tracks for Public Enemy's Revolverlution. After four years of touring, Wynn wrote and recorded again on Public Enemy's album New Whirl Odor and in 2007 on the album How You Sell Soul to a Soulless People Who Sold Their Soul?.

Khari Wynn established the jazz fusion band Solstice and released the debut album Exploration = Discovery independently in Memphis in 2004 with subsequent releases in 2005 and 2007.

In 2004, Wynn toured alongside Stax recording artist, Shirley Brown.

After James Brown's passing in late 2006, Wynn was approached to play guitar on the James Brown Tribute Tour in 2007 which featured him alongside music legends Bootsy Collins and Clyde Stubblefield. He toured with the tribute band for much of 2007 and early 2008.

In 2007 Wynn began regularly performing as a bass player with saxophonist Hope Clayburn, a musician who has been featured with such acts as Allman Brothers Band, James Brown, Gov't Mule, Maceo Parker, Soulive, DJ Logic and North Mississippi AllStars.

Starting in 2008, Khari Wynn was the working bass player with singer/songwriter Valerie June during the time she was featured on MTV's $5 Cover, a reality show created and produced by director Craig Brewer.

Wynn has also served since 2008 as a bass player for the Bluff City Backsliders, led by Jason Freeman, an artist with various credits including work performed on soundtrack of the film Black Snake Moan.

In 2011, after a decade with the group, Wynn became the music director for Public Enemy.

== Discography ==
Public Enemy:

- 2002 Revolverlution
- 2005 New Whirl Odor
- 2007 How You Sell Soul to a Soulless People Who Sold Their Soul?
- 2012 The Evil Empire of Everything
- 2012 Most of My Heroes Still Don't Appear on No Stamp
- 2015 Man Plans God Laughs
- 2018 Celebration of Ignorance (Independent release, Chuck D as Mistachuck)
- 2020 What You Gonna Do When the Grid Goes Down?

7th Octave:

- 2004 The 7th Degree

The Peeps of Soulfunk:

- 2007 Tribb to JB

The Banned:

- 2007 Banned 4 Life

Solstice:

- 2004 Solstice – Exploration = Discovery
- 2005 Solstice – Live: Beyond the Galaxy
- 2007 Solstice – Hyperspace Wavelength Travel

Anthony Crawford:

- 2010 Urban Jazz

Floyd Taylor:

- 2010 Legacy

Miz Stefani

- 2021 Starfire
