= Fight the Power (Public Enemy song) =

- Cover art featuring Danny Aiello and Spike Lee, lead actors of the Do the Right Thing film

Single by Public Enemy

from the album Fear of a Black Planet and Do the Right Thing: Original Motion Picture Soundtrack
- B-side: "Fight the Power (Flavor Flav Meets Spike Lee)"
- Released: July 4, 1989
- Recorded: 1989
- Genre: Political hip hop
- Length: 5:23 (original, Do the Right Thing soundtrack version); 6:45 (extended version); 4:42 (Fear of a Black Planet album version) (without Branford Marsalis)
- Label: Motown
- Songwriters: Carlton Ridenhour; Eric Sadler; Hank Boxley; Keith Boxley
- Producer: The Bomb Squad

Public Enemy singles chronology
"Black Steel in the Hour of Chaos" (1989)	"Fight the Power" (1989)	"Welcome to the Terrordome" (1990)

Music video
- "Fight the Power" on YouTube

"Fight the Power" is a song by American hip hop group Public Enemy, released as a single in the summer of 1989 on Motown Records. It was conceived at the request of film director Spike Lee, who sought a musical theme for his 1989 film Do the Right Thing. First issued on the film's 1989 soundtrack, the extended version was featured on Public Enemy's third studio album Fear of a Black Planet (1990).

"Fight the Power" incorporates various samples and allusions to African-American culture, including civil rights exhortations, black church services, and the music of James Brown. Spike Lee also directed a music video in Brooklyn featuring a political rally of "a thousand" black youth, with appearances by Lee and the Public Enemy members (Chuck D, Flavor Flav, Terminator X), uniformed Fruit of Islam men, and signs of historic black figures such as Martin Luther King Jr. and Malcolm X.

As a single, "Fight the Power" reached number one on Hot Rap Singles and number 20 on the Hot R&B Singles. It was named the best single of 1989 by The Village Voice in their Pazz & Jop critics' poll. It has become Public Enemy's best-known song and has received accolades as one of the greatest songs of all time by critics and publications. In 2001, the song was ranked number 288 on the "Songs of the Century" list compiled by the Recording Industry Association of America (RIAA) and the National Endowment for the Arts. In 2021, the song was ranked number two on Rolling Stone's list of the 500 Greatest Songs of All Time, and in 2025, it was ranked number two on its list of "The 100 Best Protest Songs of All Time."

== Background ==
In 1988, shortly after the release of their second album It Takes a Nation of Millions to Hold Us Back, Public Enemy were preparing for the European leg of the Run's House tour with Run–D.M.C. Before embarking on the tour, film director Spike Lee approached Public Enemy with the proposition of making a song for one of his movies. Lee, who was directing Do the Right Thing, sought to use the song as a leitmotif in the film about racial tension in a Brooklyn, New York neighborhood. He said of his decision in a subsequent interview for Time, "I wanted it to be defiant, I wanted it to be angry, I wanted it to be very rhythmic. I thought right away of Public Enemy". At a meeting in Lower Manhattan, Lee told lead MC Chuck D, producer Hank Shocklee of the Bomb Squad, and executive producer Bill Stephney that he needed an anthemic song for the film.

While flying over Italy on the tour, Chuck D was inspired to write most of the song. He recalled his idea, "I wanted to have sorta like the same theme as the original 'Fight the Power' by the Isley Brothers and fill it in with some kind of modernist views of what our surroundings were at that particular time." The group's bass player Brian Hardgroove has said of the song's message, "Law enforcement is necessary. As a species we haven't evolved past needing that. Fight the Power is not about fighting authority—it's not that at all. It's about fighting abuse of power."

== Recording and production ==
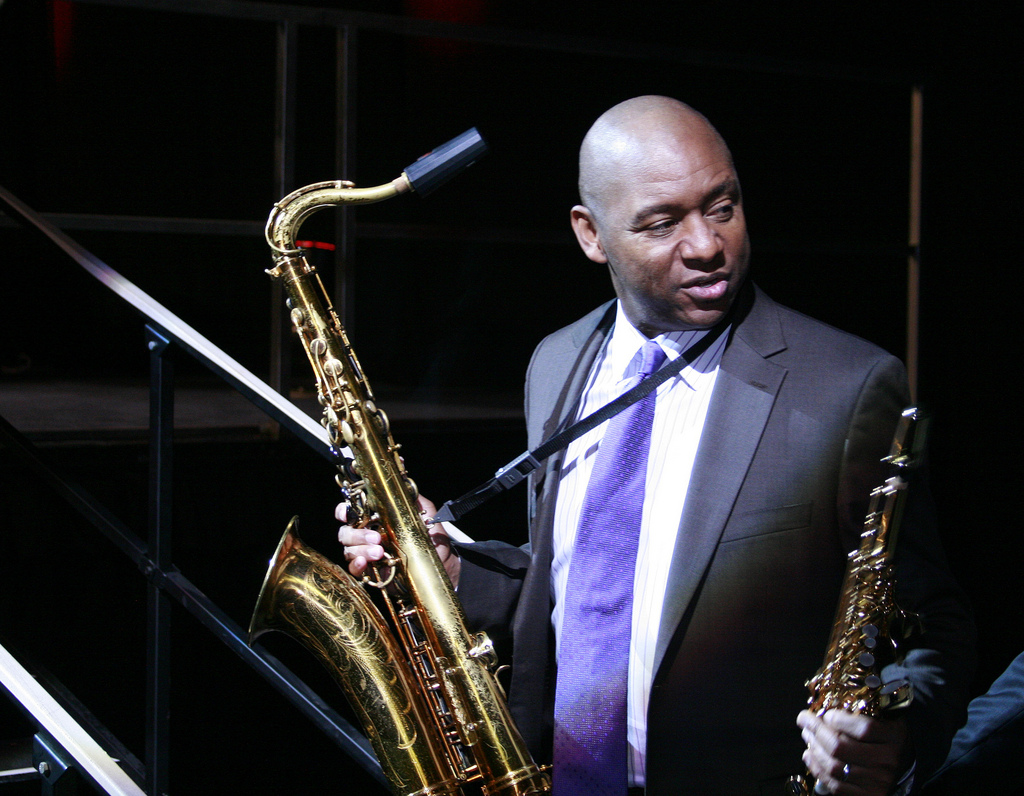
Branford Marsalis (photographed in 2011) played a saxophone solo for the song's soundtrack version.

The Bomb Squad, Public Enemy's production team, constructed the music for "Fight the Power", through the looping, layering, and transfiguring of numerous samples. The track features only two live instrumentalists: saxophone, played by Branford Marsalis, and scratches provided by Terminator X, the group's DJ and turntabilist—Marsalis also played a saxophone solo for the extended soundtrack version of the song.

In contrast to Marsalis' school of thought, Bomb Squad members such as Hank Shocklee wanted to eschew melodic clarity and harmonic coherence in favor of a specific mood in the composition. Shocklee explained that their musicianship was dependent on different tools, exercised in a different medium, and was inspired by different cultural priorities, different from the "virtuosity" valued in jazz and classical music. Marsalis later remarked on the group's unconventional musicality:

They're not musicians, and don't claim to be—which makes it easier to be around them. Like, the song's in A minor or something, then it goes to D7, and I think, if I remember, they put some of the A minor solo on the D7, or some of the D7 stuff on the A minor chord at the end. So it sounds really different. And the more unconventional it sounds, the more they like it.

As with other Public Enemy songs, the Bomb Squad recontextualized various samples, and used them to complement the vocals and mood of "Fight the Power". The percussive sounds were placed either ahead of or behind the beat, to create a feeling of either easiness or tension. Particular elements, such as Marsalis' solo, were reworked by Shocklee so that they would signify something different from harmonic coherence. The Bomb Squad layered parts of Marsalis' D minor improvisations over the song's B♭7 groove, and vice versa. Regarding the production of the song, Robert Walser, an American musicologist, wrote that the solo "has been carefully reworked into something that Marsalis would never think to play, because Schocklee's goals and premises are different from his."

On August 24, 2014, Chuck D posted a photo on his Twitter profile of a cassette tape from the Green St. studio. The tape's label is branded with the studio's branding and a hand-written title suggests that the studio was used for the recording of the song.

=== Sampling and loops ===
Although it samples many different works, the total length of each sample fragment is fairly short, as most span less than a second, and the primary technique used to construct them into the track was looping by Bomb Squad-producers Hank and Keith Shocklee. In looping, a recorded passage—typically an instrumental solo or break—could be repeated by switching back and forth between two turntables playing the same record. The looping in "Fight the Power", and hip hop music in general, directly arose from the hip hop DJs of the 1970s, and both Shocklees began their careers as DJs. Although the looping for "Fight the Power" was not created on turntables, it has a central connection to DJing. Author Mark Katz writes in his Capturing Sound: How Technology Has Changed Music, "Many hip-hop producers were once DJs, and skill in selecting and assembling beats is required of both. ... Moreover, the DJ is a central, founding figure in hip-hop music and a constant point of reference in its discourse; producers who stray too far from the practices and aesthetics of DJing may risk compromising their hip-hop credentials".

Chuck D recalled the track's extravagant looping and production, saying that "we put loops on top of loops on top of loops". Katz comments in an analysis of the track, "The effect created by Public Enemy's production team is dizzying, exhilarating, and tantalizing—clearly one cannot take it all in at once". He continues by discussing the connection of the production to the work as a whole, stating:

When Public Enemy's rapper and spokesman Chuck D. explains, "Our music is all about samples," he reveals the centrality of recording technology to the group's work. Simply put, "Fight the Power," and likely Public Enemy itself, could not exist without it. "Fight the Power" is a complex and subtle testament to the influence and possibilities of sound recording; but at the same time, it reveals how the aesthetic, cultural, and political priorities of musicians shape how the technology is understood and used. A look at Public Enemy's use of looping and performative quotation in "Fight the Power" illuminates the mutual influences between musician and machine.

== Composition ==
=== Musical structure ===
"Fight the Power" begins with a vocal sample of civil rights attorney and activist Thomas "TNT" Todd, speechifying in a resonant, agitated voice, "Yet our best trained, best educated, best equipped, best prepared troops refuse to fight. Matter of fact, it's safe to say that they would rather switch than fight". This 16-second passage is the longest of the numerous samples incorporated to the track. It is followed by a brief three-measure section (0:17–0:24) that is carried by the dotted rhythm of a vocal sample repeated six times; the line "pump me up" from Trouble Funk's 1982 song of the same name played backwards indistinctly. The rhythmic measure-section also features a melodic line, Branford Marsalis' saxophone playing in triplets that is buried in the mix, eight snare drum hits in the second measure, and vocal exclamations in the third measure. One of the exclamations, a nonsemantic "chuck chuck" taken from the 1972 song "Whatcha See Is Whatcha Get" by the Dramatics, serves as a reference to Chuck D. The "let me hear you say" exclamation originates from "Sing a Simple Song" by Sly and the Family Stone.

The three-measure section crescendos into the following section (0:24–0:44), which leads to the entrance of the rappers and features more complex production. In the first four seconds of the section, no less than 10 distinct samples are looped into a whole texture, which is then repeated four more times as a meta-loop. The whole section contains samples of guitar, synthesizer, bass, including that of James Brown's 1971 recording "Hot Pants", four fragmented vocal samples, including those of Brown's famous grunts in his recordings, and various percussion samples. Although it is obscured by the other samples, Clyde Stubblefield's drum break from James Brown's 1970 song "Funky Drummer", one of the most frequently sampled rhythmic breaks in hip hop, makes an appearance, with only the break's first two eighth notes in the bass drum and the snare hit in clarity. This section has a sharp, funky guitar riff playing over staccato rhythms, as a course voice exhorts the line "Come on, get down". Other samples include "I Know You Got Soul", "Planet Rock" and "Teddy's Jam".

=== Lyrics ===
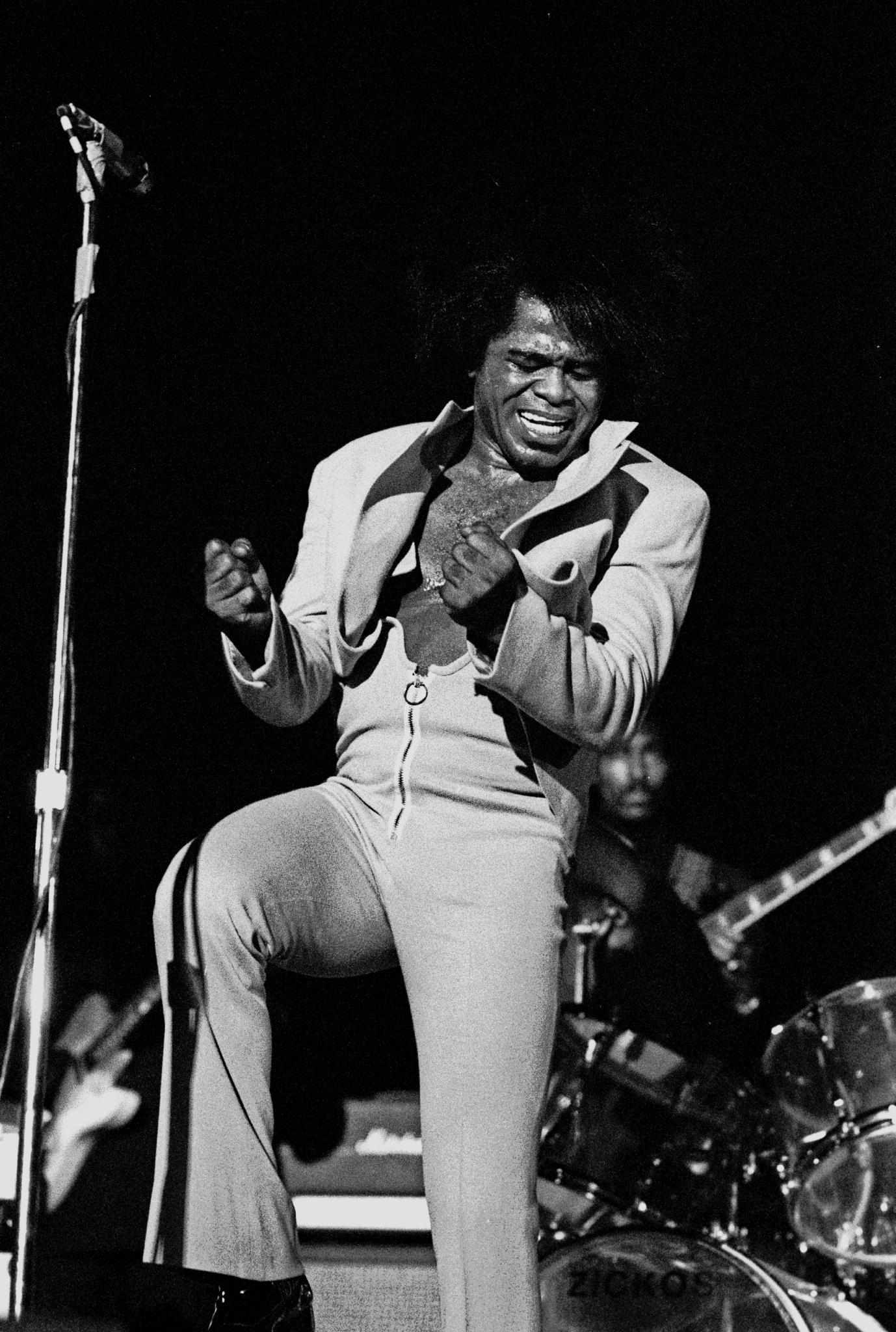
The song features allusions to and samples of James Brown (photographed in 1973).

The song's lyrics features revolutionary rhetoric calling to fight the "powers that be". They are delivered by Chuck D, who raps in a confrontational, unapologetic tone. David Stubbs of The Quietus writes that the song "shimmies and seethes with all the controlled, incendiary rage and intent of Public Enemy at their height. It's set in the immediate future tense, a condition of permanently impending insurrection".

"Fight the Power" opens with Chuck D roaring "1989!" His lyrics declare an African-American perspective in the first verse, as he addresses the "brothers and sisters" who are "swingin' while I'm singin' / Givin' whatcha gettin'". He also clarifies his group's platform as a musical artist: "Now that you've realized the pride's arrived / We've got to pump the stuff to make us tough / From the heart / It's a start, a work of art / To revolutionize". In addressing race, the lyrics dismiss the liberal notion of racial equality and the dynamic of transcending one's circumstances as it pertains to his group of people: "'People, people we are the same' / No, we're not the same / 'Cause we don't know the game". Chuck D goes on to call from the power structure to "give us what we want/ Gotta give us what we need", and intelligent activism and organization from his African-American community: "What we need is awareness / We can't get careless ... Let's get down to business / Mental self-defensive fitness". In the line, Chuck D references his audience as "my beloved", an allusion to Martin Luther King Jr.'s vision of the "beloved community".

The samples incorporated to "Fight the Power" largely draw from African-American culture, with their original recording artists being mostly important figures in the development of late 20th-century African-American popular music. Vocal elements characteristic of this are various exhortations common in African-American music and church services, including the lines "Let me hear you say", "Come on and get down", and "Brothers and sisters", as well as James Brown's grunts and Afrika Bambaataa's electronically processed exclamations, taken from his 1982 song "Planet Rock". The samples are reinforced by textual allusions to such music, quoted by Chuck D in his lyrics, including "sound of the funky drummer" (James Brown and Clyde Stubblefield), "I know you got soul" (Bobby Byrd), "freedom or death" (Stetsasonic), "people, people" (Brown's "Funky President"), and "I'm black and I'm proud" (Brown's "Say It Loud – I'm Black and I'm Proud"). The track's title itself invokes the Isley Brothers' song of the same name.

==== Third verse ====
The song's third verse contains disparaging lyrics about iconic American entertainers Elvis Presley and John Wayne, as Chuck D raps, "Elvis was a hero to most / But he never meant shit to me / Straight up racist, the sucker was / Simple and plain", with Flavor Flav following, "Mothafuck him AND John Wayne!". Chuck D was inspired to write the lines after hearing proto-rap artist Clarence "Blowfly" Reid's "Blowfly Rapp" (1980), in which Reid engages in a battle of insults with a fictitious Klansman who makes a similarly phrased, racist insult against him and boxer Muhammad Ali.

The third verse expresses the identification of Presley with racism—either personally or symbolically—and the fact that Presley, whose musical and visual performances owed much to African-American sources, unfairly achieved the cultural acknowledgment and commercial success largely denied to his black peers in rock and roll.

Chuck D later clarified his lyric associating Elvis Presley with racism. In an interview with Newsday timed with the 25th anniversary of Presley's death, Chuck D acknowledged that Elvis was held in high esteem by black musicians, and that Elvis himself admired black musical performers. Chuck D stated that the target of his line about Elvis was the white culture that hailed Elvis as a "King" without acknowledging the black artists that came before him.

The line disparaging John Wayne is a reference to his controversial personal views, including racist remarks made in his 1971 Playboy Interview, in which Wayne stated, "I believe in white supremacy until the blacks are educated to a point of responsibility. I don't believe in giving authority and positions of leadership and judgment to irresponsible people."

Chuck D clarifies previous remarks in the verse's subsequent lines: "Cause I'm black and I'm proud / I'm ready and hyped, plus I'm amped / Most of my heroes don't appear on no stamps / Sample a look back you look and find / Nothing but rednecks for 400 years if you check". Laura K. Warrell of Salon interprets the verse as an attack on embodiments of the white American ideal in Presley and Wayne, as well as its discriminative culture.

==== Labeling of Elvis Presley as "straight up racist" ====
The song describes Elvis Presley as a "straight up racist." Despite this claim, it has been acknowledged that Presley had a long history of good relations with African Americans, and even admired black music while growing up, with many of his songs even being credited for increasing awareness of African American music. Muhammad Ali, who served as the inspiration for lyrics about Presley, had previously, for two boxing fights in 1973, donned a "People's Choice" robe which Presley gave him and even openly described Elvis as one of his "close personal" friends. James Brown, whose music inspired "Fight the Power," publicly noted his friendship with Elvis as well, even stating "I was his brother." Elvis also on one occasion publicly stated that he believed Fats Domino, another friend of his who was African American, was the real "King of Rock and Roll."

== Release and reception ==
On May 22, 1989, Professor Griff, the group's "Minister of Information", was interviewed by The Washington Times and made anti-Semitic comments, calling Jews "wicked" and blaming them for "the majority of wickedness that goes on across the globe", including financing the Atlantic slave trade and being responsible for South African apartheid. The comments drew attention from the Jewish Defense Organization (JDO), which announced a boycott of Public Enemy and publicized the issue to record executives and retailers. Consequently, the song's inclusion in Do the Right Thing led to pickets at the film's screenings from the JDO. Griff's interview was also decried by media outlets. In response, Chuck D sent mixed messages to the media for a month, including reports of the group disbanding, not disbanding, boycotting the music industry, and dismissing Griff from the group. In June, Griff was dismissed from the group, and "Fight the Power" was released on a one-off deal with Motown Records. Public Enemy subsequently went on a self-imposed break from the public in order to take pressure off of Lee and his film. Their next single for Fear of a Black Planet, "Welcome to the Terrordome", featured lyrics defending the group and attacking their critics during the controversy, and stirred more controversy for them over race and antisemitism.

During their self-imposed inactivity, "Fight the Power" climbed the Billboard charts. It was released as a 7-inch single in the United States and the United Kingdom, while an extended (but censored) version was released on a 12-inch and a CD maxi single. The original uncensored "Soundtrack Version" was featured on Do the Right Thing's soundtrack album and eventually on the Deluxe Editions of both It Takes a Nation of Millions to Hold Us Back and Fear of a Black Planet.

"Fight the Power" was well-received by music critics upon its release. Greg Sandow of Entertainment Weekly wrote that it is "perhaps the strongest pop single of 1989". "Fight the Power" was voted the best single of 1989 in The Village Voice's annual Pazz & Jop critics' poll. Robert Christgau, the poll's creator, ranked it as the sixth best on his own list. It was nominated for a Grammy Award for Best Rap Performance at the 1990 Grammy Awards.

The lyrics disparaging Elvis Presley and John Wayne were shocking and offensive to many listeners at the time. Chuck D reflected on the controversy surrounding these lyrics by stating that "I think it was the first time that every word in a rap song was being scrutinized word for word, and line for line."

== Music video ==
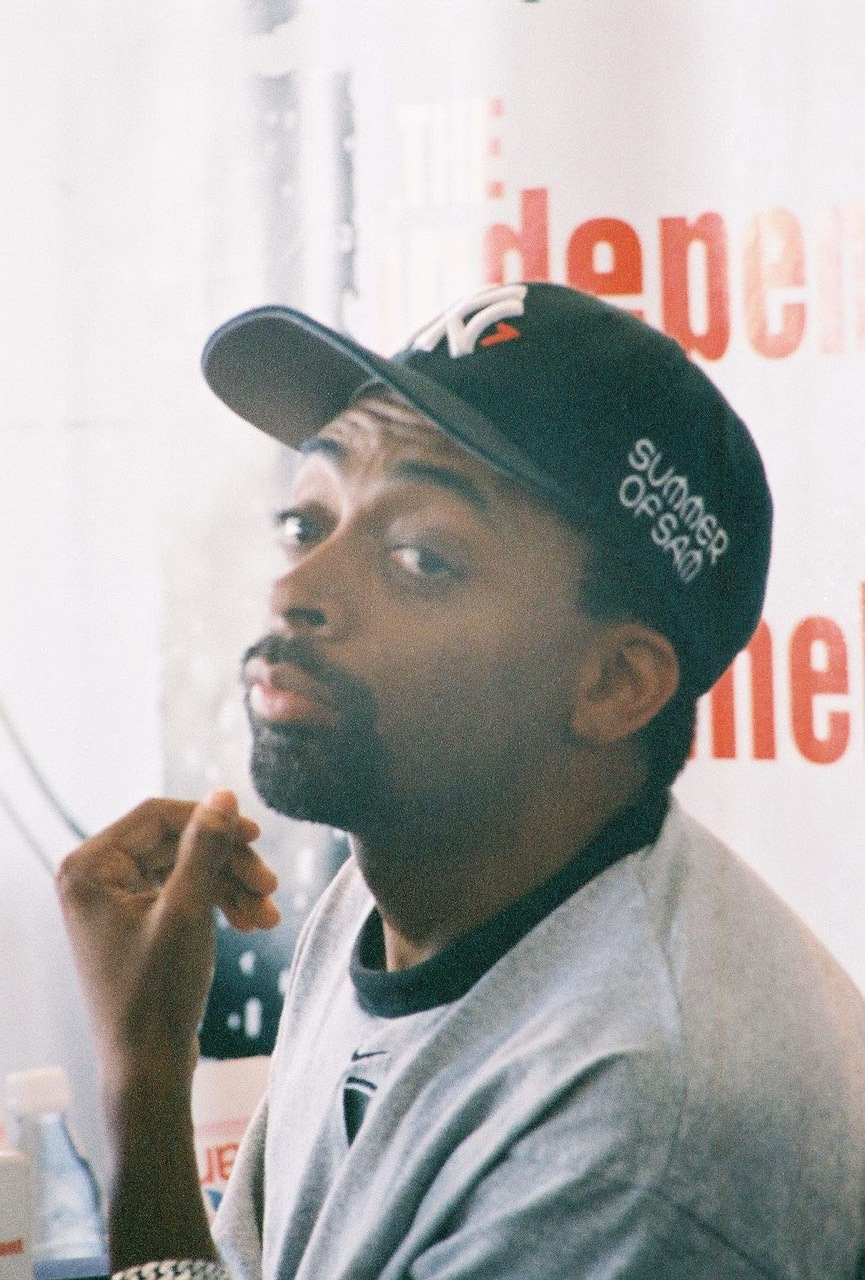
Director Spike Lee in 1999

The song's music video was filmed in Bedford–Stuyvesant, Brooklyn on April 22, 1989, and presented Public Enemy in part political rally, part live performance. Public Enemy biographer Russell Myrie wrote that the video "accurately [brought] to life ... the emotion and anger of a political rally".

Spike Lee produced and directed it and opened the video with film from the 1963 March on Washington and transitioned to a staged, massive political rally in New York City's Brooklyn called the "Young People's March to End Racial Violence". Extras wearing T-shirts that said "Fight the Power" carried signs featuring Paul Robeson, Marcus Garvey, Angela Davis, Frederick Douglass, Muhammad Ali, and other black icons. The Fruit of Islam, which is the security detail of the Nation of Islam, provided security throughout the rally and plainly appear in the video.

It was actually the second music video of the song: the lesser-known first video, also directed and produced by Lee, featured clips of various scenes from Do the Right Thing.

== Appearances ==
"Fight the Power" plays through Spike Lee's film Do the Right Thing. It plays in the opening credits as Rosie Perez's character Tina dances to the song, shadowboxing and demonstrating her personality's animus. The song is most prevalent in scenes with Bill Nunn's imposing character Radio Raheem, who carries a boombox around the film's neighborhood with the song playing loudly and represents Black consciousness.

Additionally, "Fight the Power" was also featured in the opening credits of the PBS documentary Style Wars about inner-city youth using graffiti as an artistic form of social resistance.

"Fight the Power" also appears in a season three episode of The King of Queens, while Arthur, Doug, and Deacon are walking the streets to kill time while on strike.

In the Season 5 episode of the medical drama and mystery television series House titled House Divided, the main title character Dr. Gregory House plays the song on a jukebox when interrupting his fellow doctor, Dr. Eric Foreman, performing a medical test on a deaf patient. House uses the jukebox’s vibrations to diagnose that the patient is suffering from neuropathy after placing the jukebox on the patient’s chest while playing “Fight The Power.”

In 1989, "Fight the Power" was played in the streets of Overtown, Miami, in celebration of the guilty verdict of police officer William Lozano, whose shooting of a black motorist led to two fatalities and a three-day riot in Miami that heightened tensions between African Americans and Hispanics. That year, the song was also played at the African-American fraternity party Greekfest in Virginia Beach, where tensions had grown between a predominantly White police force and festival-attending African Americans. According to attendees, the Greekfest riots were precipitated by a frenzied crowd that had heard the song as it was played from a black van.

== Legacy and influence ==
Public Enemy's explosive 1989 hit single brought hip-hop to the mainstream—and brought revolutionary anger back to pop.

— Laura K. Warrell, Salon

"Fight the Power" became an anthemic song for politicized youth when it was released in 1989. Janice C. Simpson of Time wrote in a 1990 article, "The song not only whipped the movie to a fiery pitch but sold nearly 500,000 singles and became an anthem for millions of youths, many of them black and living in inner-city ghetto's [sic]." Laura K. Warrell of Salon writes that the song was released "at a crucial period in America's struggle with race", crediting the song with "capturing both the psychological and social conflicts of the time." She interprets it as a reaction to "the frustrations of the Me Decade", including the crack epidemic in the inner cities, AIDS pandemic, racism, and the effects of Ronald Reagan and George H. W. Bush's presidencies on struggling urban communities. Warrell cites "Fight the Power" as Public Enemy's "most accessible hit", noting its "uncompromising cultural critique, its invigoratingly danceable sound and its rallying", and comments that it "acted as the perfect summation of [the group's] ideology and sound." It became Public Enemy's best-known song among music listeners. The group closes all their concerts with the song. Spike Lee and the group collaborated again in 1998 on the soundtrack album to Lee's film He Got Game, also the group's sixth studio album.

Chuck D acknowledged that "Fight the Power" is "the most important record that Public Enemy have done". Critics and publications have also praised "Fight the Power" as one of the greatest songs of all time. In 2001, the song was ranked number 288 in the "Songs of the Century" list compiled by the Recording Industry Association of America and the National Endowment for the Arts. In 2004, it was ranked number 40 on AFI's 100 Years...100 Songs, a list of the top 100 songs in American cinema. In 2004, Rolling Stone ranked the song number 322 on its list of the 500 Greatest Songs of All Time. The song was ranked number 2 in Rolling Stone's 2021 list. In 2025, the magazine placed it at number 2 on its list of "The 100 Best Protest Songs of All Time." In 2008, it was ranked number one on VH1's 100 Greatest Songs of Hip Hop. In 2011, Time included the song on its list of the All-Time 100 Songs. "Fight the Power" is also one of The Rock and Roll Hall of Fame's 500 Songs that Shaped Rock and Roll. In September 2011 it topped Time Out's list of the 100 Songs That Changed History, with Matthew Collin, author of This Is Serbia Calling, citing its use by the rebel radio station B92 during the 1991 protests in Belgrade as the reason for its inclusion. Collin explained that, when B92 were banned from broadcasting news of the protests on their station, they circumvented the ban by instead playing "Fight the Power" on heavy rotation to motivate the protestors.

In 2022, it was revealed that the BBC and PBS had acquired a four-part music documentary series, fronted and executive produced by Chuck D, titled Fight the Power: How Hip Hop Changed the World, for broadcast in January 2023 on BBC Two in the UK and PBS in the US. Named after "Fight the Power", the series explores the relationship between hip hop and American politics, with appearances from artists including Eminem, Ice-T, Killer Mike, LL Cool J, Monie Love and Will.i.am. In June 2026, CBS News included the song in its list of the 250 essential American songs of the past 250 years.

=== Cover versions ===
In 1996, the song was covered by D.C.K. for the electro-industrial various artists compilation Operation Beatbox.

In 1991, an abbreviated version of the song was released by Barenaked Ladies on The Yellow Tape, with a longer version on the 1993 Coneheads film soundtrack.

In 2011, American mathcore band the Dillinger Escape Plan covered the song with Chuck D. on the album Homefront: Songs for the Resistance; a promo for the video game Homefront.

In July 2020, Public Enemy did a live performance of "Fight the Power" at the 2020 BET Awards, alongside YG, Nas, Black Thought, and Rapsody, among others.

== Charts ==
Chart (1989)	Peak position
Netherlands (Dutch Top 40)	30
UK Singles (Official Charts)	29
US Hot Dance Music/Maxi-Singles Sales (Billboard)	3
US Hot R&B/Hip-Hop Songs (Billboard)	20
US Hot Rap Singles (Billboard)	1

== Certifications ==
Region	Certification	Certified units/sales
United States (RIAA) Video longform	Gold	50,000^{^}
^{^} Shipments figures based on certification alone.

== Bibliography ==
- Austin, Joe; Willard, Michael, eds. (1998). Generations of Youth: Youth Cultures and History in Twentieth-Century America. NYU Press. p. 297. ISBN 0-8147-0646-0.
- Friskics-Warren, Bill (September 1, 2006). I'll Take You There: Pop Music and the Urge for Transcendence. London: Continuum International Publishing Group. ISBN 0826419216.
- Katz, Mark (2004). Capturing Sound: How Technology Has Changed Music. University of California Press. ISBN 0-520-24380-3.
- Myrie, Russell (2008). Don't Rhyme for the Sake of Riddlin': The Authorised Story of Public Enemy. Canongate, 2008. ISBN 978-1847670564.
- Santoro, Gene (October 12, 1995). Dancing in Your Head: Jazz, Blues, Rock, and Beyond. Oxford University Press. ISBN 0195101235.
- Strong, Martin Charles (October 21, 2004). The Great Rock Discography (7th ed.). Canongate U.S. ISBN 1841956155.
