= 911 Is a Joke =

1990 single by Public Enemy

Single by Public Enemy

from the album Fear of a Black Planet
- Released: April 9, 1990
- Recorded: 1989
- Genre: Golden age hip hop; political hip hop
- Length: 3:17
- Label: Def Jam
- Songwriters: William Drayton; Keith Boxley; Eric Sadler
- Producer: The Bomb Squad

Public Enemy singles chronology
"Brothers Gonna Work It Out" (1990)	"911 Is a Joke" (1990)	"Can't Do Nuttin' for Ya Man" (1990)

Music video
- "911 Is A Joke" on YouTube

"911 Is a Joke" is a 1990 song by American hip hop group Public Enemy, from their third album, Fear of a Black Planet. Solely performed by Flavor Flav, the track became a hit in April 1990 upon its release as a single, reaching number 15 on the Hot R&B/Hip-Hop Singles & Tracks chart, and number one on the Hot Rap Singles chart, becoming their second number-one rap chart hit after "Fight the Power". It also reached number one on the Bubbling Under Hot 100 Singles chart. This was due largely to its sales, which were unusually high for the level of mainstream airplay it received; Billboard reported that only one of the stations on its Top 40 panel was playing it.

The song is about the lack of response to emergency calls in a black neighborhood, but it specifically references the poor response by paramedic crews and not the police, which is a common misconception regarding the track; the "911" in the title of the song refers to 9-1-1, the emergency telephone number used in North America.

== Production ==
The song was written by Public Enemy member Flavor Flav (who is also the featured vocalist) and producers Keith Shocklee and Eric "Vietnam" Sadler of The Bomb Squad, Public Enemy's production team.

== Music video ==
The official music video, directed by Charles Stone III, is notable for having an appearance from a then-unknown Samuel L. Jackson.

== Samples used ==
Among the samples used in "911 Is a Joke" is Vincent Price's laughter from "Thriller" by Michael Jackson. Other samples include "Flash Light" by Parliament, "Misunderstood" by Mico Wave, "Think (About It)" by Lyn Collins, "Gottago Gottago!" by Robin Harris, "Devil With the Bust" by Sound Experience, "Feel Like Dancing" by Wilbur "Bad" Bascomb, and "Hit by a Car" and "Singers" by Eddie Murphy. According to law professors Peter DiCola and Kembrew McLeod, if the samples used on "911 Is a Joke" and the other tracks on Fear of a Black Planet had been cleared for copyright under 2010 rates, each copy of the album would have generated a loss of five dollars per album sold, instead of a profit.

== Charts ==
=== Weekly charts ===
Chart (1990)	Peak position
Australia (ARIA)	64
Italy Airplay (Music & Media)	2
Netherlands (Single Top 100)	71
New Zealand (Recorded Music NZ)	22
Switzerland (Swiss Hitparade)	25
UK Singles Chart	41
US Billboard Bubbling Under Hot 100 Singles	1
US Billboard Hot Rap Singles	1
US Billboard Hot R&B/Hip-Hop Songs	15
US Billboard Hot Dance Music/Maxi-Singles Sales	26

== Covers and media references ==
San Francisco alternative metal band Faith No More covered a snippet of the song during several shows in 1990.

In October 1994, the song was featured prominently in the opening scene of "Tasha", an early episode of the Fox police drama television series New York Undercover.

In 1995, English rock band Duran Duran covered "911 Is a Joke" on their Thank You album.

In 2006, the song was featured in the animated sitcom American Dad! in an episode "Finances with Wolves" where the main protagonist Stan Smith briefly dances to the song.

In 2009, The Washington Post ran a story discussing Public Enemy members' visit to a center for homeless and displaced youth. The article referred to the song "911 Is a Joke", but due to a copy-editing error, "911" was printed as "9/11", which some readers took to be a reference to the September 11 attacks. A week later, the Post printed a correction.

In "Epidemiology", a 2010 episode of the NBC sitcom Community, Jeff (portrayed by Joel McHale) is unable to contact a 911 operator during an emergency—prompting him to declare that "Flavor Flav was right".
