= Black Sky Over the Projects: Apartment 2025 =

Studio album by Public Enemy
- Released: June 27, 2025
- Length: 40:00
- Label: Enemy

Public Enemy chronology
What You Gonna Do When the Grid Goes Down? (2020)	Black Sky Over the Projects: Apartment 2025 (2025)

Professional ratings
Review scores
Source	Rating
AllMusic	3.5/5 stars
And It Don't Stop	A–

Black Sky Over the Projects: Apartment 2025 is the sixteenth studio album by American hip-hop group Public Enemy, released digitally on June 27, 2025, through Enemy Records. Physical editions on vinyl and CD were released on October 10, 2025. The album contains 12 tracks and marks the group's first full-length release since What You Gonna Do When the Grid Goes Down? (2020). The record continues Public Enemy’s exploration of political and social themes, focusing on urban life, inequality, and resistance.

== Track listing ==
Black Sky Over the Projects: Apartment 2025 track listing
No.	Title	Length
1.	"Siick"	4:52
2.	"Confusion (Here Come the Drums)"	2:45
3.	"What Eye Said"	3:17
4.	"C'mon Get Down"	2:55
5.	"Evil Way"	4:32
6.	"Sexegenarian Vape"	3:06
7.	"Messy Hens"	3:22
8.	"Fools Fool Fools" (Dirty Drums Mixx)	3:46
9.	"Public Enemy Comin Throoooo"	3:00
10.	"Ageism"	4:05
11.	"The Hits Just Keep On Comin"	2:13
12.	"March Madness"	2:54
Total length:		40:00

== Charts ==
Chart performance for Black Sky Over the Projects: Apartment 2025
Chart (2025)	Peak position
UK Independent Albums (Official Charts)	50
