= Brian Hardgroove =

Music producer and bass player

- Born: United States
- Genres: Hip hop
- Occupation(s): Bass player, record producer, educator
- Instrument: Bass guitar
- Formerly of: Public Enemy

Brian Hardgroove is a producer and former bass player for the hip hop group Public Enemy. He has also played bass on tour with Bootsy Collins and T.M. Stevens.

== Career ==
Hardgroove works as a producer and educator. As of 2015, he is the resident artist at Santa Fe University of Art and Design, where he helped start the Artists for Positive Social Change program. As a music producer, Hardgroove cites Eddie Kramer and Jack Douglas as two of his closest advisers in the music business. He worked as a producer for Demerit and Brain Failure. He is also the founder of From a Whisper to a Dream, a program that helps young musicians obtain endorsements from manufacturers of musical equipment.

His project "Audio Rhythm Theory" was made with The Police drummer Stewart Copeland, along with King's X bassist and vocalist Doug Pinnick. Hardgroove was also in production with Fred Schneider of The B-52s completing the debut album for Good Thang. Schneider and Hardgroove composed all the songs together. Hardgroove played all the instruments while Schneider provided vocals.

== Personal life ==
He grew up in Hollis, Queens, but relocated to Santa Fe, New Mexico in 2006.
