= What You Gonna Do When the Grid Goes Down? =

Studio album by Public Enemy
- Released: September 25, 2020
- Length: 43:57
- Labels: Enemy; Def Jam
- Producers: Chuck D (exec.); Flavor Flav (also exec.); The LBX (also exec.); C-Doc; DJ Infinite; DJ Pain 1; DJ Premier; Easy Mo Bee; Johnny "Juice" Rasado; Racer X; Threepeeoh

Public Enemy chronology
Nothing Is Quick in the Desert (2017)	What You Gonna Do When the Grid Goes Down? (2020)	Black Sky Over the Projects: Apartment 2025 (2025)

Singles from What You Gonna Do When the Grid Goes Down?
- 1. "State of the Union (STFU)" Released: June 19, 2020; 2. "Fight the Power: Remix 2020" Released: August 28, 2020

What You Gonna Do When the Grid Goes Down? is the fifteenth studio album by American political hip hop group Public Enemy. It was released on September 25, 2020, on Def Jam Recordings, making it the group's first album for the label since 1998's He Got Game. Production was handled by C-Doc, The LBX, DJ Infinite, DJ Pain 1, DJ Premier, Easy Mo Bee, Flavor Flav, Johnny "Juice" Rasado, Racer X and Threepeeoh. It features guest appearances from George Clinton, Jahi, Ad-Rock, Black Thought, Cypress Hill, Daddy-O, Ice-T, James Bomb, Mark Jenkins, Mike D, Ms. Ariel, Nas, PMD, Pop Diesel, Questlove, Rapsody, Run-DMC, The Impossebulls and YG. It was supported by two singles: "State of the Union (STFU)" and "Fight the Power: Remix 2020".

== Critical reception ==
Professional ratings
Aggregate scores
Source	Rating
AnyDecentMusic?	7.6/10
Metacritic	76/100
Review scores
Source	Rating
AllMusic	4/5 stars
And It Don't Stop	A−
Clash	7/10
Consequence of Sound	B
Exclaim!	7/10
Kerrang!	4/5
NME	4/5 stars
Paste	8/10
PopMatters	7/10
Rolling Stone	3.5/5 stars

What You Gonna Do When the Grid Goes Down? was met with generally positive reviews. At Metacritic, which assigns a normalized rating out of 100 to reviews from professional publications, the album received an average score of 76, based on 12 reviews. The aggregator AnyDecentMusic? has the critical consensus of the album at a 7.6 out of 10, based on 13 reviews.

Reviewing in his "Consumer Guide" column, Robert Christgau acknowledged Public Enemy's continued noisy aesthetic and felt engaged by Chuck D's thoughts on "the dependence of everybody's world economy on an information system susceptible to attack from actors who could prove as dangerous as Donald Trump himself". He highlighted in particular the song "State of the Union (STFU)" and "a host of committed cameos" elsewhere.

== Track listing ==
No.	Title	Writer(s)	Producer(s)	Length
1.	"When the Grid Goes Down..." (featuring George Clinton)	George Clinton; David C. Snyder; Khari Wynn	C-Doc	1:31
2.	"GRID" (featuring Cypress Hill and George Clinton)	Carlton Ridenhour; Clinton; Louis Freese; Torman Jahi; Senen Reyes; Snyder	C-Doc	4:32
3.	"State of the Union (STFU)" (featuring DJ Premier)	Ridenhour; Chris Martin	DJ Premier	2:54
4.	"Merica Mirror" (featuring Pop Diesel)		The LBX	0:08
5.	"Public Enemy Number Won" (featuring Mike D, Ad-Rock and Run-DMC)	Ridenhour; Hank Shocklee	C-Doc	5:25
6.	"Toxic"	Lord Aswod; Ridenhour; T. Worthan	Threepeeoh	3:11
7.	"Yesterday Man" (featuring Daddy-O)	Ridenhour; Marcus Ankeney; Glenn Bolton; Rayvoughn Pearson	DJ Infinite; Racer X; C-Doc^{[a]}	3:03
8.	"Crossroads Burning (Interlude)" (featuring James Bomb)		C-Doc	0:12
9.	"Fight the Power: Remix 2020" (featuring Nas, Rapsody, Black Thought, Jahi, YG, and Questlove)	Ridenhour; Eric Sadler; H. Shocklee; Keith Shocklee	Johnny "Juice" Rasado	4:57
10.	"Beat Them All"	Ridenhour; Snyder	C-Doc	2:52
11.	"Smash the Crowd" (featuring Ice-T and PMD)	Ridenhour; Tracy Marrow; Parrish Smith; Snyder	C-Doc	3:06
12.	"If You Can't Join Em Beat Em"	Ridenhour; Snyder	C-Doc	0:50
13.	"Go at It" (featuring Jahi)	Ridenhour; Ankeney; Pacal Bayley; Trevor Helt; Torman Jahi	DJ Pain 1	3:21
14.	"Don't Look at the Sky (Interlude)" (featuring Mark Jenkins)		C-Doc	0:09
15.	"Rest in Beats" (featuring the Impossebulls)	Ridenhour; Ankeney; Osten Harvey Jr.; Jahi; Snyder; Wynn	C-Doc; Easy Mo Bee	3:57
16.	"R.I.P. Blackat"	William Drayton; Rashad Brown	Flavor Flav	3:35
17.	"Closing: I Am Black" (featuring Ms. Ariel)		C-Doc; The LBX	0:14
Total length:				43:57

Note

- ^{^[a]} signifies an additional producer.

== Personnel ==
Musicians

- C-Doc – bass guitar (tracks 1, 5, 10–12, 15), drums (1, 5), drum programming (2, 10–12)
- Khari Wynn – guitar (tracks 1, 2, 7, 15)
- George Clinton – vocals (track 1)
- B-Real – additional vocals (track 2)
- Sen Dog – additional vocals (track 2)
- Uncle Jam – additional vocals (track 2)
- Alex Grossi – background vocals (track 2)
- Ron Mancuso – background vocals (track 2)
- Tom Fletcher – background vocals (track 2)
- Kevin "KJ" Jacoby – bass guitar (track 2)
- Johnny "Juice" Rosado – conga, guitar, keyboards, percussion (track 9)
- Clyde Stubblefield – drums (track 9)
- Davy J. Snyder – additional vocals (track 10)
- Eva Rose DeMeno – additional vocals (track 10)
- Mason DeMeno – additional vocals (track 10)
- Trevor Helt – bass guitar, guitar (track 13)
- The Impossebulls – additional vocals (track 15)
- Easy Mo Bee – drum programming (track 15)

Technical

- Shawn Franklin – mastering
- C-Doc – mixing (tracks 1, 3, 5, 7, 10–12, 15), engineering (10, 12)
- DJ Premier – mixing (track 3)
- Threepeeoh – mixing (track 6), engineering (2, 5, 6)
- Ryan Rickaby – mixing (track 13)
- Mr. Payback – mixing, engineering (track 16)
- JP Hesser – engineering (tracks 2, 3, 5–7, 9–13, 15)
- John Taitano Phillips – engineering (track 2)
- Skinny Pablo – engineering (track 2)
- Ronnie Mancuso – engineering (tracks 3, 5)
- Tom Fletcher – engineering (tracks 3, 5)
- Alex Graves – engineering (track 5)
- Headsnack – engineering (track 5)
- Patrick Flores – engineering (track 5)
- Racer X – engineering (track 7)
- Bryan Matheson – engineering (track 13)
- DJ Pain 1 – engineering (track 13)
- Rusty Skelding – engineering (track 15)
- Johnny "Juice" Rosado – remix engineering (track 9)

== Charts ==
Chart performance for What You Gonna Do When the Grid Goes Down?
Chart (2020)	Peak position
German Albums (Offizielle Top 100)	81
Scottish Albums (Official Charts)	36
Swiss Albums (Schweizer Hitparade)	37
UK Albums (Official Charts)	100
UK R&B Albums (Official Charts)	2
US Top Album Sales (Billboard)	26
