= Nothing Is Quick in the Desert =

Studio album by Public Enemy
- Released: June 30, 2017
- Genre: Hip hop
- Length: 40:45
- Producer: Chuck D (exec.); C-Doc; Dejuan Boyd; DJ Infinite; DJ Pain 1; East Duel West; Mike Redman; Racer X; Sammy Vegas; Threepeeoh

Public Enemy chronology
| Man Plans God Laughs (2015) | Nothing Is Quick in the Desert (2017) | What You Gonna Do When the Grid Goes Down? (2020) |

Nothing Is Quick in the Desert is the fourteenth studio album by American hip hop group Public Enemy. It was digitally self-released on June 30, 2017, via Bandcamp. Production was handled by C-Doc, DeJuan Boyd with Rabbitt Productions, DJ Infinite, DJ Pain 1, East Duel West, Mike Redman, Racer X, Sammy Vegas and Threepeeoh, with Chuck D serving as executive producer. It features guest appearances from Daddy-O, Ice-T, Jahi, PMD and Solé.

== Critical reception ==
Professional ratings
Aggregate scores
| Source | Rating |
|---|---|
| Metacritic | 71/100 |
Review scores
| Source | Rating |
| Chicago Tribune | 2.5/4 stars |
| Consequence of Sound | B− |
| HipHopDX | 3.5/5 |
| Noisey | (2-star Honorable Mention) |
| Pitchfork | 6/10 |
| Punknews.org | 3/5 stars |
| RapReviews | 7.5/10 |

Nothing Is Quick in the Desert was met with generally favorable reviews from music critics. At Metacritic, which assigns a normalized rating out of 100 to reviews from mainstream publications, the album received an average score of 71, based on six reviews.

Steve 'Flash' Juon of RapReviews stated: "that's not to say there's no "Boom and Proud" anywhere to be found on Nothing but it's not "Shut 'Em Down" level like those old Bomb Squad albums from the 1980's and early 90's". Kellan Miller of HipHopDX wrote: "celebrating their 30th anniversary, there's still plenty of life in the elder statesmen who once started a musical revolution". Matt Melis of Consequence of Sound wrote: "Public Enemy's message hits hardest when the lyrics remain open for listeners to step inside. A couple presidential putdowns are enough (no need for another "Son of a Bush"), and the small handful of times the album stumbles are when the focus narrows to micro grievances like calling out Kanye and Kim for being "a spectacle instead of spectacular" ("Yesterday Man") or pointing out the negative effects of social media on millennials ("SOC MED Digital Heroin")". Greg Kot of Chicago Tribune wrote: "Nothing is Quick in the Desert—its 14th studio recording—flexes the group's stadium-rap muscle. This was an album specifically designed to be played live, and some of the subtlety and nuance that informs Chuck D's most incisive raps is missing".

In mixed reviews, Jay Balfour of Pitchfork wrote: "for all the missteps, there are gratifying moments littered throughout. For the most part, the production, spearheaded by David "CDOC" Snyder, is patched together smartly and with regard to tradition".

== Track listing ==
| No. | Title | Producer(s) | Length |
|---|---|---|---|
| 1. | "Nothing Is Quick in the Desert" | DJ Pain 1 | 1:21 |
| 2. | "sPEak!" | C-Doc | 3:33 |
| 3. | "Yesterday Man" (featuring Daddy-O) | DJ Infinite; Racer X | 4:21 |
| 4. | "Exit Your Mind" | C-Doc | 0:52 |
| 5. | "Beat Them All" | C-Doc | 2:56 |
| 6. | "Smash the Crowd" (featuring Ice-T and PMD) | C-Doc | 3:33 |
| 7. | "If You Can't Join Em Beat Em" | C-Doc | 1:28 |
| 8. | "So Be It" (featuring Jahi) | DJ Pain 1 | 3:51 |
| 9. | "SOC MED Digital Heroin" (featuring Solé) | Dejuan Boyd | 3:55 |
| 10. | "Terrorwrist" | Mike Redman | 1:58 |
| 11. | "Toxic" | Threepeeoh | 3:12 |
| 12. | "Sells Like Teens Hear It" | East Duel West; Sammy Vegas | 2:58 |
| 13. | "Rest in Beats (Part 1 & 2)" | C-Doc | 6:54 |
| Total length: | | | 40:45 |
