= Man Plans God Laughs =

Studio album by Public Enemy
- Released: July 16, 2015
- Recorded: 2014–2015
- Genre: Hip hop
- Length: 27:55
- Label: Spitdigital
- Producer: Gary G-Wiz, Carl Ryder

Public Enemy chronology
The Evil Empire of Everything (2012)	Man Plans God Laughs (2015)	Nothing Is Quick in the Desert (2017)

Man Plans God Laughs is the thirteenth studio album by American hip hop group Public Enemy. The album was released on Spotify on July 16, 2015.

== Background ==
The title of the album, "Man Plans God Laughs", is a well known English translation of a Yiddish proverb: "Der mentsh trakht un got lakht" as reported in The Forward and reviewed on Pitchfork.

The album is a critique of corporate domination of the recording industry, what Public Enemy frontman Chuck D calls a "corporate plantation". According to Chuck D, "CBS, RCA and EMI, today's music-biz corporateplantationopolies are Apple, Google and Facebook. He says "The pigs are walking as tall as the men, but it's impossible to say which is which." and adds "I feel like the government controls the media and the people are not being fed the truth. " He says the album's title 'Man Plans God Laughs' was inspired by legendary basketball player Julius Erving mentioning the proverb in the documentary about him titled The Doctor. Chuck D had narrated the project. He says "When Dr. J said it, he was referring to all his plans for him and his brother, and then his brother passed away. That spoke volumes." Chuck says, "The message I got from that was, 'Stay humble'." He also included the song 'Mine Again' written ten years earlier about African Americans feeling conflicted about their African roots.

== Critical reception ==
Professional ratings
Aggregate scores
Source	Rating
Metacritic	70/100
Review scores
Source	Rating
AllMusic	4/5 stars
The Arts Desk	3/5 stars
Consequence of Sound	B−
Newsday	B+
NME	6/10
Pitchfork	6.2/10
Spin	7/10
Vice (Expert Witness)	(1-star Honorable Mention)

Man Plans God Laughs received generally positive reviews from music critics. At Metacritic, which assigns a normalized rating out of 100 to reviews from mainstream critics, the album received an average score of 70 based on 7 reviews, which indicates "generally favorable reviews".

== Track listing ==
All tracks are produced by Gary G-Wiz

No.	Title	Length
1.	"No Sympathy from the Devil"	2:50
2.	"Me to We"	2:15
3.	"Man Plans God Laughs"	2:04
4.	"Give Peace a Damn"	3:01
5.	"Those Who Know, Know Who"	2:11
6.	"Honky Talk Rules"	3:48
7.	"Mine Again"	2:12
8.	"Lost in Space Music"	2:26
9.	"Corplantationopoly"	2:27
10.	"Earthizen"	2:27
11.	"Praise the Loud"	2:14
