= The Evil Empire of Everything =

Studio album by Public Enemy
- Released: October 1, 2012
- Genre: Hip-hop
- Length: 50:42
- Label: ENEMY
- Producers: C-Doc; Chuckie Madness; DJ Pain 1; Davy DMX; Divided Souls Entertainment; Flavor Flav; Gary G-Wiz; Johnny Juice Rosado; Professor Griff

Public Enemy chronology
| Most of My Heroes Still Don't Appear on No Stamp (2012) | The Evil Empire of Everything (2012) | Man Plans God Laughs (2015) |

Singles from The Evil Empire of Everything
- 1. "Say It Like It Really Is" Released: 2010; 2. "Everything" Released: 2012

The Evil Empire of Everything is the twelfth studio album by American hip-hop group Public Enemy. Originally available exclusively on iTunes, it was released on October 1, 2012 through ENEMY Records with distribution via SPITdigital. CD version was released on November 6, 2012, along with the album Most of My Heroes Still Don't Appear on No Stamp, which, Chuck D, described as a "fraternal twin" to The Evil Empire of Everything. A vinyl edition was made available on April 19, 2014, to commemorate Record Store Day. The two LP sets, limited to 500 copies, included a 2014 anniversary calendar "25 Years of Public Enemy".

== Critical reception ==
Professional ratings
Aggregate scores
| Source | Rating |
|---|---|
| Metacritic | 76/100 |
Review scores
| Source | Rating |
| AllMusic | 4/5 stars |
| Consequence of Sound | 2.5/5 stars |
| MSN Music (Expert Witness) | B+ |
| Rolling Stone | 3.5/5 stars |
| Tom Hull – on the Web | A− |

The Evil Empire of Everything was met with generally favorable reviews from music critics. At Metacritic, which assigns a normalized rating out of 100 to reviews from mainstream publications, the album received an average score of 76 based on five reviews.

Robert Christgau of MSN Music praised the album, stating "midway through, here comes some madman with the deeply stoopid "31 Flavors" and you realize it wasn't going along fine enough". AllMusic's Stephen Thomas Erlewine concluded: "this is how a hip-hop group reaches middle age: by placing themselves as part of a tradition, never lingering in the past but never desperately riding trends". Martin Caballero of The Boston Globe wrote: "while it's naïve to think PE will ever have the same impact it did back then, there's still too many strong moments on Evil Empire to dismiss it". Will Hermes of Rolling Stone called the album "a predictably righteous volley of rhyme grenades on race and pop-culture politics, tinged with grumpy nostalgia, it's startlingly potent".

In his mixed reviews for Consequence, Matt Melis declared: "the best of The Evil Empire of Everything simmers like the frank dinner table conversation afterwards-a dialogue that white America rarely gets to hear and one that gets cut tragically short on this record".

== Track listing ==
| No. | Title | Writer(s) | Producer(s) | Length |
|---|---|---|---|---|
| 1. | "The Evil Empire Of..." | Carlton Douglas Ridenhour; Lord Aswod; Alejandro Bayley; Brent Dixon; Chris Moss | DJ Pain 1; Divided Souls Entertainment | 1:52 |
| 2. | "Don't Give Up the Fight" (featuring Ziggy Marley) | Ridenhour; David Nesta Marley; Gary J. Rinaldo | Gary G-Wiz | 3:47 |
| 3. | "1 (PEace)" | Ridenhour; John Rosado | DJ Johnny 'Juice' Rosada | 2:46 |
| 4. | "2 (resPEct)" (featuring Davy DMX) | Ridenhour; David Franklin Reeves | Davy DMX; Professor Griff; C-Doc | 3:09 |
| 5. | "Beyond Trayvon" (featuring NME Sun) | Ridenhour; A. Williams; K.A. Griffin; Jamal Malik; R.K. Pace; Richard Griffin; David C. Snyder | Professor Griff; C-Doc (co.) | 4:29 |
| 6. | "...Everything" (featuring Gerald Albright and Sheila Brody) | Ridenhour; Gerald Albright; Sheila Brody; Rinaldo | Gary G-Wiz | 4:11 |
| 7. | "31 Flavors" (featuring Rampage) | William Drayton; Roger McNair; Dereck McKinnis | Felony Muzik; Flavor Flav (co.) | 3:09 |
| 8. | "Riotstarted!" (featuring Tom Morello and Henry Rollins) | | Gary G-Wiz | 3:27 |
| 9. | "Notice (Know This)" | Ridenhour; Rinaldo | Gary G-Wiz | 2:14 |
| 10. | "ICEbreaker" (featuring The Impossebulls, Kyle Jason, Sekreto and True Mathematics) | Ridenhour; Joseph Lucas Howze; Marcus James Ankeney; Kyle J. Smith; M. Alvarado; Kenneth Earl Houston; Snyder; R. Griffin | C-Doc | 7:14 |
| 11. | "Fame" | Ridenhour; Drayton; Charles Shaw | Chuckie Madness; Flavor Flav; Professor Griff; C-Doc | 4:49 |
| 12. | "Broke Diva" | Ridenhour; Drayton; Samuel Kim | Sammy Sam | 3:12 |
| 13. | "Say It Like It Really Is" | Ridenhour; Drayton; Rosado; Smith; Brian Jason Butts; Janol Lamont Holmes | DJ Johnny 'Juice' Rosada; Professor Griff; C-Doc | 6:23 |
| Total length: | | | | 50:42 |
