= Public Enemy =

American hip-hop group

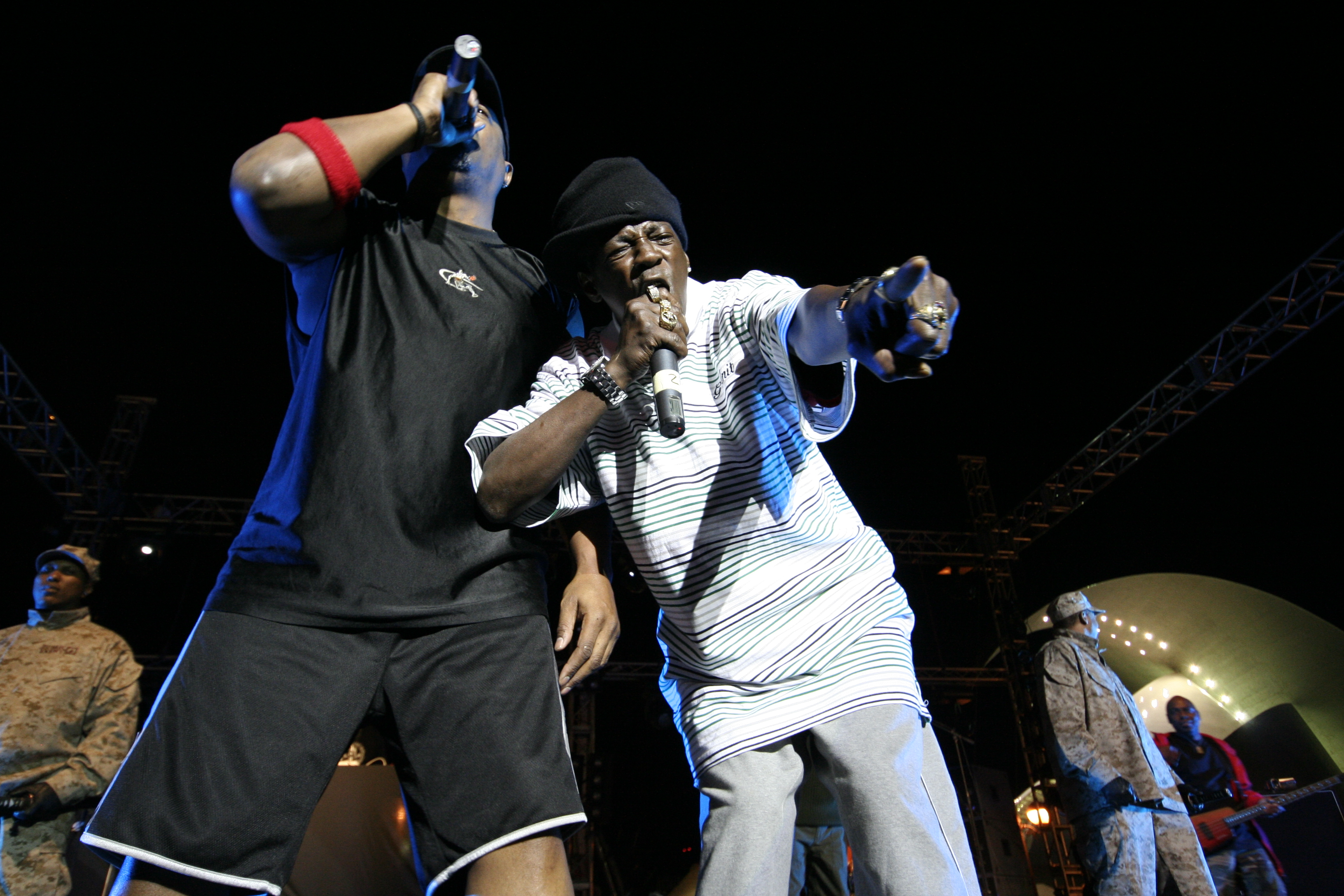
- Public Enemy performing in 2007

Background information
- Origin: Hempstead, New York, U.S.
- Genres: East Coast hip-hop; political hip-hop; hardcore hip-hop; rap rock; progressive rap; rapcore
- Works: Discography
- Years active: 1985–present
- Labels: Def Jam; Columbia; PIAS
- Spinoffs: Prophets of Rage
- Members: Chuck D Flavor Flav; DJ Johnny Juice; Brian Hardgroove; Jahi; S1W Pop Diesel; S1W James Bomb
- Past members: Professor Griff; Terminator X DJ Lord; Sister Souljah; Davy DMX; Khari Wynn; T-Bone
- Website: publicenemy.com

Public Enemy is an American hip-hop group formed in Roosevelt, New York, in 1985 by Chuck D and Flavor Flav. The group rose to prominence for their political messages including subjects such as American racism and the American media. Their debut album, Yo! Bum Rush the Show, was released in 1987 to critical acclaim, and their second album, It Takes a Nation of Millions to Hold Us Back (1988), was the first hip-hop album to top The Village Voice's Pazz & Jop critics' poll. Their next three albums, Fear of a Black Planet (1990), Apocalypse 91... The Enemy Strikes Black (1991), and Muse Sick-n-Hour Mess Age (1994), were also well received. The group has since released eleven more studio albums, including the soundtrack to the 1998 sports-drama film He Got Game and a collaborative album with Paris, Rebirth of a Nation (2006). Their most recent album, Black Sky Over the Projects: Apartment 2025, was released in 2025.

Public Enemy has gone through many lineup changes over the years, with Chuck D and Flavor Flav remaining the only constant members. Co-founder Professor Griff left in 1989 but rejoined in 1998, before parting ways again some years later. DJ Lord also joined Public Enemy in 1998 as the replacement of the group's original DJ Terminator X. In 2020, it was announced that Flavor Flav had been fired from the group. His firing was later revealed to be a publicity stunt that was called an April Fools' Day prank. Public Enemy, without Flavor Flav, would also tour and record music under the name of Enemy Radio which consists of the lineup of Chuck D, Jahi, DJ Lord and the S1Ws.

Public Enemy's first four albums during the late 1980s and early 1990s were all certified either gold or platinum and were, according to music critic Robert Hilburn in 1998, "the most acclaimed body of work ever by a hip hop act". Critic Stephen Thomas Erlewine called them "the most influential and radical band of their time". They were inducted into the Rock and Roll Hall of Fame in 2013. They were honored with the Grammy Lifetime Achievement Award at the 62nd Grammy Awards.

== History ==
=== 1985–1987: Formation and early years ===
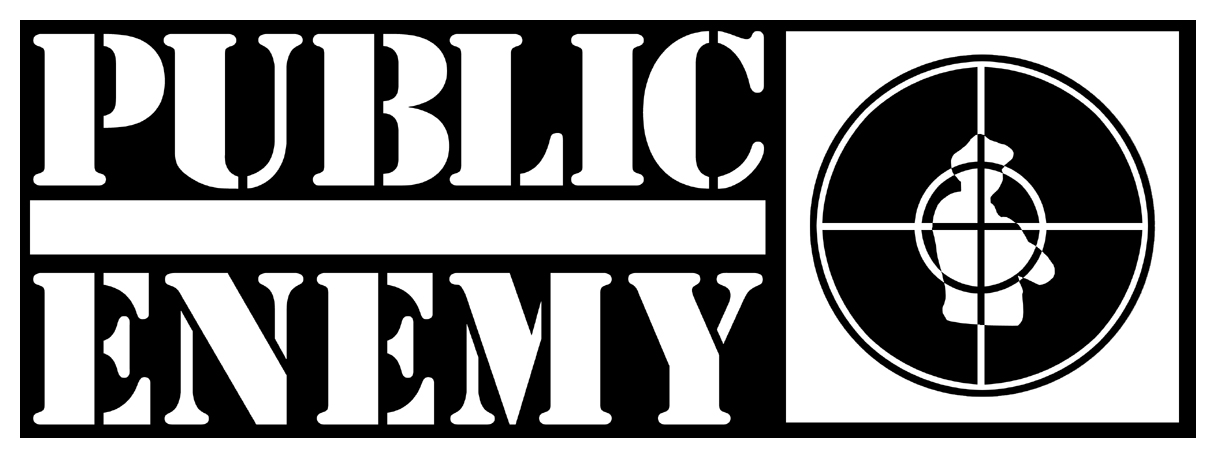
Public Enemy's official logo

Public Enemy was formed in 1985 by Carlton Ridenhour (Chuck D) and William Drayton (Flavor Flav), who met at Adelphi University on Long Island in the mid-1980s. Developing his talents as an MC with Flav while delivering furniture for his father's business, Chuck D and Spectrum City, as the group was called, released the record "Check Out the Radio", backed by "Lies", a social commentary—both of which would influence RUSH Productions' Run–D.M.C. and Beastie Boys. Chuck D put out a tape to promote WBAU (the radio station where he was working at the time) and to fend off a local MC who wanted to battle him. He called the tape Public Enemy #1 because he felt like he was being persecuted by people in the local scene. This was the first reference to the notion of a public enemy in any of Chuck D's songs. The single was created by Chuck D with a contribution by Flavor Flav, though this was before the group Public Enemy was officially assembled. Around 1986, Bill Stephney, the former Program Director at WBAU, was approached by Sam Mulderrig, who offered Stephney a position with the label. Stephney accepted, and his first assignment was to help fledgling producer Rick Rubin sign Chuck D, whose song "Public Enemy Number One" Rubin had heard from Andre "Doctor Dré" Brown.

According to The History of Rap Music by Cookie Lommel, "Stephney thought it was time to mesh the hard-hitting style of Run DMC with politics that addressed black youth. Chuck recruited Spectrum City, which included Hank Shocklee, his brother Keith Shocklee, and Eric "Vietnam" Sadler, collectively known as the Bomb Squad, to be his production team and added another Spectrum City partner, Professor Griff, to become the group's Minister of Information. With the addition of Flavor Flav and another local mobile DJ named Terminator X, the group Public Enemy was born". According to Chuck, The S1W, which stands for Security of the First World, "represents that the black man can be just as intelligent as he is strong. It stands for the fact that we're not third-world people, we're first-world people; we're the original people". Hank Shocklee came up with the name Public Enemy based on "underdog love and their developing politics" and the idea from Def Jam staffer Bill Stephney following the Howard Beach racial incident, Bernhard Goetz, and the death of Michael Stewart: "The Black man is definitely the public enemy."

Public Enemy started out as opening act for the Beastie Boys during the latter's Licensed to Ill popularity.

=== 1987–1993: Mainstream success ===
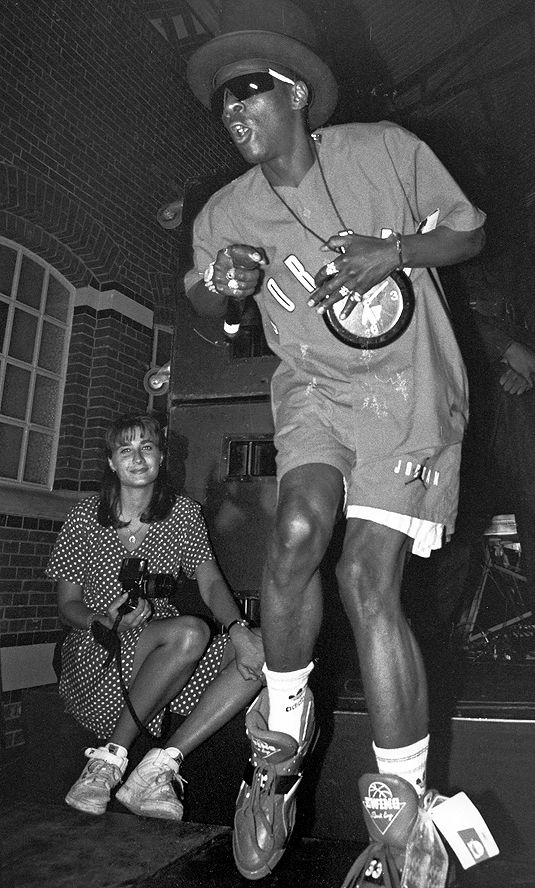
Flavor Flav performing in Malmö, Sweden, in 1991

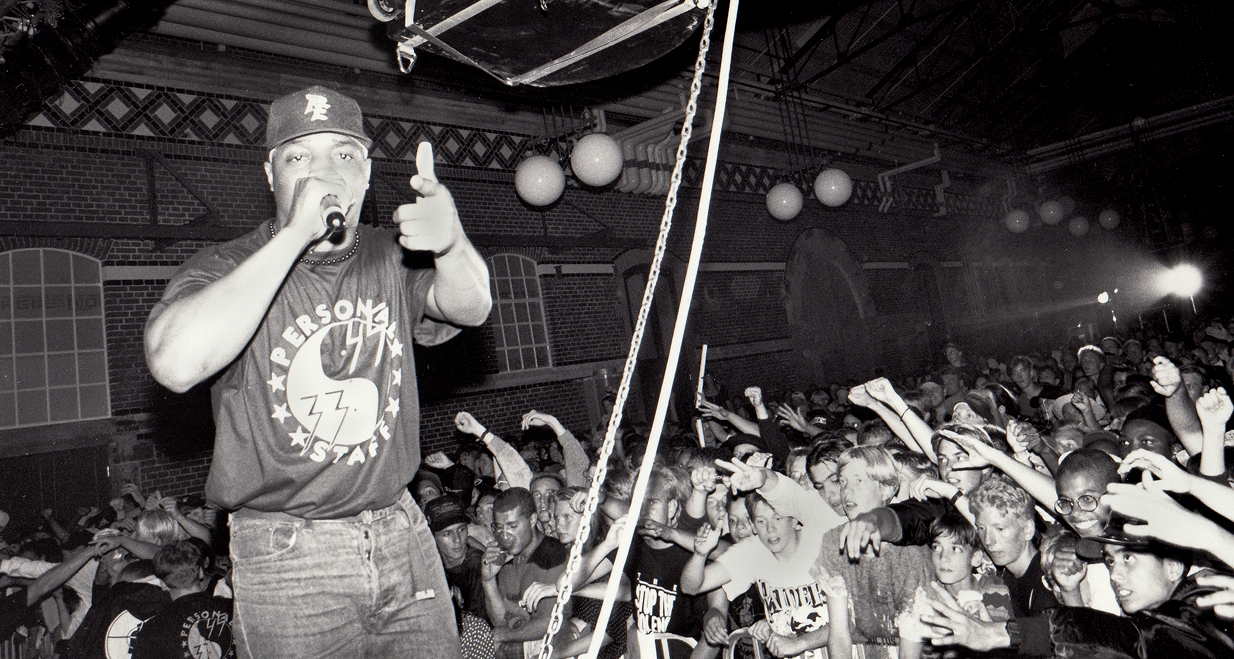
Chuck D. performing in Malmö, Sweden, in 1991

The group's debut album, Yo! Bum Rush the Show, was released in March 1987. In October 1987, music critic Simon Reynolds dubbed Public Enemy "a superlative rock band". They released their second album, It Takes a Nation of Millions to Hold Us Back, in 1988, which performed better in the charts than their previous release, and included the hit single "Don't Believe the Hype" in addition to "Bring the Noise". It was the first hip-hop album to be voted album of the year in The Village Voice's influential Pazz & Jop critics' poll.

In 1989, the group returned to the studio to record their third album, Fear of a Black Planet, which continued their politically charged themes. The album was supposed to be released in late 1989, but was pushed back to April 1990. It was the most successful of any of their albums and, in 2005, was selected for preservation in the National Recording Registry. It included the singles "Welcome to the Terrordome", written after the band was criticized by Jews for Professor Griff's antisemitic comments, "911 Is a Joke", which criticized emergency response units for taking longer to arrive at emergencies in the black community than those in the white community, and "Fight the Power". "Fight the Power" is regarded as one of the most popular and influential songs in hip-hop history. It was the theme song of Spike Lee's Do the Right Thing.

The group's fourth album, Apocalypse 91... The Enemy Strikes Black, continued this trend, with songs like "Can't Truss It", which addressed the history of slavery and how the black community can fight back against oppression; "I Don't Wanna be Called Yo Nigga", a track that takes issue with the use of the word nigga outside of its original derogatory context. The album also included the controversial song and video "By the Time I Get to Arizona", which chronicled the black community's frustration that some US states did not recognize Martin Luther King Jr.'s birthday as a national holiday. The video featured members of Public Enemy taking out their frustrations on politicians in the states not recognizing the holiday.

In 1992, the group was one of the first rap acts to perform at the Reading Festival in the UK, headlining the second day of the three-day festival.

=== 1994–2019: Later years and member changes ===
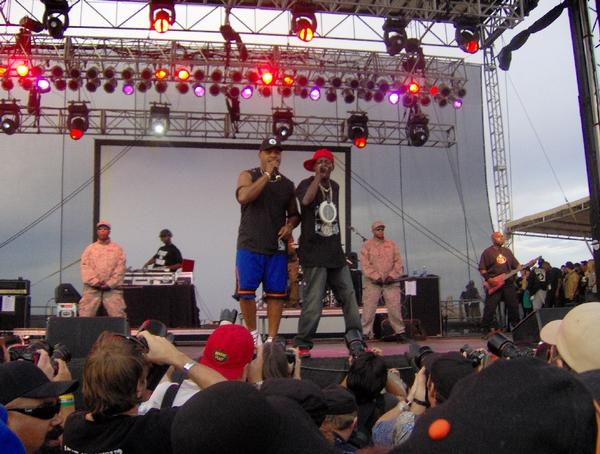
Public Enemy performing in Las Vegas, United States, in October 2007. Left to right: DJ Lord, Chuck D, and Flavor Flav.

After a 1994 motorcycle accident shattered his left leg and kept him in the hospital for a full month, Terminator X relocated to his 15-acre farm in Vance County, North Carolina. By 1998, he was ready to retire from the group and focus full-time on raising African black ostriches on his farm. In late 1998, the group started looking for Terminator X's permanent replacement. Following several months of searching for a DJ, Professor Griff saw DJ Lord at a Vestax Battle and approached him about becoming the DJ for Public Enemy. DJ Lord joined as the group's full-time DJ just in time for Public Enemy's 40th World Tour. Since 1999, he has been the official DJ for Public Enemy on albums and world tours while winning numerous turntablist competitions, including multiple DMC finals.

In 1999, the group released a new album titled There's a Poison Goin' On. It was the first album to be released only in downloadable format, without any physical media. It was subsequently published on CD through Koch records.

In 2007, the group released an album entitled How You Sell Soul to a Soulless People Who Sold Their Soul?. Public Enemy's single from the album was "Harder Than You Think". Four years after How You Sell Soul ... , in January 2011, Public Enemy released the album Beats and Places, a compilation of remixes and "lost" tracks. On July 13, 2012, Most of My Heroes Still Don't Appear on No Stamp was released and was exclusively available on iTunes. In July 2012, on UK television an advert for the London 2012 Summer Paralympics featured a short remix of the song "Harder Than You Think". The advert caused the song to reach No. 4 in the UK Singles Chart on September 2, 2012. On July 30, 2012, Public Enemy performed a free concert with Salt-N-Pepa and Kid 'n Play at Wingate Park in Brooklyn, New York City, as part of the Martin Luther King Jr. Concert Series. On August 26, 2012, Public Enemy performed at South West Four music festival in Clapham Common in London. On October 1, 2012 The Evil Empire of Everything was released. On June 29, 2013, they performed at Glastonbury Festival 2013. On September 14, 2013, they performed at Riot Fest & Carnival 2013 in Chicago, Illinois. On September 20, 2013, they performed at Riot Fest & Side Show in Byers, Colorado.

In 2014, Chuck D launched PE 2.0 with Oakland rapper Jahi as a spiritual successor and "next generation" of Public Enemy. Jahi met Chuck D backstage during a soundcheck at the 1999 Rock & Roll Hall of Fame and later appeared as a support act on Public Enemy's 20th Anniversary Tour in 2007. PE 2.0's task is twofold, Jahi says, to "take select songs from the PE catalog and cover or revisit them" as well as new material with members of the original Public Enemy including DJ Lord, Davy DMX, Professor Griff and Chuck D. PE 2.0's first album, People Get Ready, was released on October 7, 2014. InsPirEd PE 2.0's second album and part two of a proposed trilogy was released a year later on October 11, 2015. Man Plans God Laughs, Public Enemy's thirteenth album, was released in July 2015. On June 29, 2017, Public Enemy released their fourteenth album, Nothing Is Quick in the Desert. The album was available for free download through Bandcamp until July 4, 2017.

=== 2020–present: Controversy, Public Enemy Radio, and return to Def Jam ===
In late February 2020, it was announced that Public Enemy (billed as Public Enemy Radio) would perform at a campaign rally in Los Angeles on March 1, 2020, for Bernie Sanders, who was campaigning to be the nominee of the Democratic Party in the 2020 presidential election. Days following the announcement, Flavor Flav's lawyer Matthew Friedman issued a cease-and desist letter asking the campaign to not use the group's name or logo, stating: "While Chuck is certainly free to express his political views as he sees fit — his voice alone does not speak for Public Enemy". Chuck D responded to the statement by saying: "Flavor chooses to dance for his money and not do benevolent work like this. He has a year to get his act together and get himself straight or he's out". A lawyer for Chuck D added: "Chuck could perform as Public Enemy if he ever wanted to; he is the sole owner of the Public Enemy trademark. He originally drew the logo himself in the mid-80s, is also the creative visionary and the group's primary songwriter, having written Flavor's most memorable lines".

On March 1, 2020, before the group's performance at the Sanders rally, Chuck D, DJ Lord, Jahi, James Bomb and Pop Diesel issued a joint statement announcing that Flavor Flav had been fired from the group, stating: "Public Enemy and Public Enemy Radio will be moving forward without Flavor Flav. We thank him for his years of service and wish him well". The statement also claimed: "Flavor Flav has been on suspension since 2016 when he was MIA from the Harry Belafonte benefit in Atlanta, Georgia. That was the last straw for the group. He had previously missed numerous live gigs from Glastonbury to Canada, album recording sessions and photo shoots. He always chose to party over work". On March 2, 2020, it was announced that Enemy Radio (dropping the Public from their name) would be releasing the album Loud Is Not Enough, which was due for release in April 2020. The album was to feature the lineup of Chuck D, DJ Lord, Jahi and the S1Ws and according to a statement from the group it will be "taking it back to hip hop's original DJ-and-turntablist foundation".

On April 1, 2020, it was revealed Flavor Flav's firing was a publicity stunt to gain attention and provide a commentary on disinformation, and Reuters claimed that Chuck D and Flavor Flav "concocted a fake split to grab attention and highlight media bias towards reporting bad news about hip hop". In an interview with rapper Talib Kweli, Chuck D stated that the stunt was inspired by Orson Welles' 1938 radio drama "The War of the Worlds". In response, Flavor Flav tweeted: "I am not a part of your hoax" and: "There are more serious things in the world right now than April Fool's jokes and dropping records. The world needs better than this...you say we are leaders so act like one".

On June 19, 2020, Public Enemy (with Flavor Flav), released the single and music video for their anti-Donald Trump song "State of the Union (STFU)". Chuck D stated, "Our collective voices keep getting louder. The rest of the planet is on our side. But it's not enough to talk about change. You have to show up and demand change. Folks gotta vote like their lives depend on it, cause it does". In 2020, the group returned to Def Jam and released their studio album What You Gonna Do When the Grid Goes Down? on September 25, 2020.

On November 25, 2023, the authors of ''Jesahel'' (Ivano Fossati and Oscar Prudente) together with Universal Music Group sued Public Enemy for plagiarism, since Fossati and Prudente are not recognized as co-authors of "Harder Than You Think"

On June 19, 2025, Public Enemy released their first new music since 2020 with a new song titled "March Madness" to celebrate the Juneteenth holiday. The song was a collaboration with students from three universities according to Flavor Flav. "It was an honor to work with the students from Harvard, Berklee, and Howard Universities to create a protest anthem about important issues we are facing as human beings right now. MARCH ON,!!"

On June 27, 2025, Public Enemy with no prior announcement made, released their sixteenth studio album, Black Sky Over the Projects: Apartment 2025, which is available only on Bandcamp for its release. For the first 72 hours following the release, fans are allowed to set their own price to purchase the album. The album was released on CD on July 25 and vinyl on October 10.

During their performance at the RiverBeat Music Festival in Memphis on May 3, 2025, they called for a "free Palestine" between songs like 'Get Up Stand Up' and 'Don't Believe The Hype'. To close their set, Flavor Flav addressed the crowd saying: "No matter what part of the world we come from, no matter what language we speak, no matter what color we are, we are all one person. With peace and togetherness, we would have so much power".

== Legacy ==
Public Enemy made contributions to the hip-hop world with sonic experimentation as well as political and cultural consciousness, which infused itself into skilled and poetic rhymes. Critic Stephen Thomas Erlewine wrote that "PE brought in elements of free jazz, hard funk, even musique concrète, via [its] producing team the Bomb Squad, creating a dense, ferocious sound unlike anything that came before." Public Enemy held a strong, pro-black, political stance. Before PE, politically motivated hip-hop was defined by a few tracks by Ice-T, Grandmaster Flash and the Furious Five, Kurtis Blow and Boogie Down Productions. Other politically motivated opinions were shared by prototypical artists Gil Scott-Heron and the Last Poets. PE was a revolutionary hip-hop act whose entire image rested on a specified political stance. With the successes of Public Enemy, many hip-hop artists began to celebrate Afrocentric themes, such as Kool Moe Dee, Gang Starr, X Clan, Eric B. & Rakim, Queen Latifah, the Jungle Brothers, and A Tribe Called Quest.

Public Enemy was one of the first hip-hop groups to do well internationally. PE changed the Internet's music distribution capability by being one of the first groups to release MP3-only albums, a format virtually unknown at the time.

Poet and hip-hop artist Saul Williams uses a sample from Public Enemy's "Welcome to the Terrordome" in his song "Tr[n]igger" on the Niggy Tardust album. He also used a line from the song in his poem, amethyst rocks.

Public Enemy helped to create and define "rap metal" by collaborating with Living Colour in 1988 ("Funny Vibe"), with Sonic Youth on the 1990 song "Kool Thing", and with New York thrash metal outfit Anthrax in 1991. The single "Bring the Noise" was a mix of semi-militant black power lyrics, grinding guitars, and sporadic humor. The two bands, cemented by a mutual respect and the personal friendship between Chuck D and Anthrax's Scott Ian, introduced a hitherto alien genre to rock fans, and the two seemingly disparate groups toured together. Flavor Flav's pronouncement on stage that "They said this tour would never happen" (as heard on Anthrax's Live: The Island Years CD) has become a legendary comment in both rock and hip-hop circles. Metal guitarist Vernon Reid (of Living Colour) contributed to Public Enemy's recordings, and PE sampled Slayer's "Angel of Death" half-time riff on "She Watch Channel Zero?!"

The Manic Street Preachers track "Repeat (Stars And Stripes)" is a remix of the band's own anti-monarchy tirade by the Bomb Squad of whom James Dean Bradfield and Richey Edwards were big fans. The song samples "Countdown to Armageddon" from It Takes a Nation of Millions to Hold Us Back. The band had previously sampled Public Enemy on their 1991 single "Motown Junk." Other rock bands that have cited Public Enemy and the Bomb Squad as influences include My Bloody Valentine, ...And You Will Know Us by the Trail of Dead, and Quicksand.

The revolutionary influence of the band is seen throughout hip-hop and is recognized in society and politics. The band "rewrote the rules of hip-hop", changing the image, sound and message forever. Pro-black lyrics brought political and social themes to hardcore hip-hop, with stirring ideas of racial equality, and retribution against police brutality, aimed at disenfranchised blacks, but appealing to all the poor and underrepresented. Before Public Enemy, hip-hop was seen as "throwaway entertainment", with trite sexist and homophobic lyrics. Public Enemy brought social relevance and strength to hip-hop. They also brought black activist Louis Farrakhan to greater popularity, and they gave impetus to the Million Man March in 1995.

Members of the Bomb Squad produced or remixed works for other acts, like Bell Biv DeVoe, Ice Cube, Vanessa Williams, Sinéad O'Connor, Blue Magic, Peter Gabriel, LL Cool J, Paula Abdul, Jasmine Guy, Jody Watley, Eric B & Rakim, 3rd Bass, Big Daddy Kane, EPMD, and Chaka Khan. According to Chuck D, "We had tight dealings with MCA Records and were talking about taking three guys that were left over from New Edition and coming up with an album for them. The three happened to be Ricky Bell, Michael Bivins, and Ronnie DeVoe, later to become Bell Biv DeVoe. Ralph Tresvant had been slated to do a solo album for years, Bobby Brown had left New Edition and experienced some solo success beginning in 1988, and Johnny Gill had just been recruited to come in, but [he] had come off a solo career and could always go back to that. At MCA, Hiram Hicks, who was their manager, and Louil Silas, who was running the show, were like, 'Yo, these kids were left out in the cold. Can y'all come up with something for them?' It was a task that Hank, Keith, Eric, and I took on to try to put some kind of hip-hop-flavored R&B shit down for them. Subsequently, what happened in the four weeks of December [1989] was that the Bomb Squad knocked out a large piece of the production and arrangement on Bell Biv DeVoe's three-million selling album Poison. In January [1990], they knocked out Fear of a Black Planet in four weeks, and PE knocked out Ice Cube's album AmeriKKKa's Most Wanted in four to five weeks in February." They have also produced local talent such as Son of Bazerk, Young Black Teenagers, Leaders of the New School, Kings of Pressure, and True Mathematics—and gave producer Kip Collins his start in the business.

The influence of the band goes also beyond hip-hop in a unique way, indeed the group was cited as an influence by artists as diverse as Autechre (selected in the All Tomorrow's Parties in 2003), Nirvana (It Takes a Nation of Millions to Hold Us Back being cited by Kurt Cobain among his favorite albums), Moby (also selected It Takes a Nation of Millions to Hold Us Back as one of his favorite albums), Nine Inch Nails (mentioned the band in Pretty Hate Machine credits), Björk (included Rebel Without a Pause in her The Breezeblock Mix in July 2007), Tricky (did a cover of Black Steel in the Hour of Chaos and appears in Do You Wanna Go Our Way ??? video), The Prodigy (included Public Enemy No. 1 in The Dirtchamber Sessions Volume One), Ben Harper, Underground Resistance (cited by both Mad Mike and Jeff Mills), Orlando Voorn, M.I.A., Amon Tobin, Mathew Jonson, Aphex Twin (Welcome To The Terrordome being the first track played after the introduction at the Coachella Festival in April 2008), Rage Against the Machine (sampling the track in their song "Renegades of Funk"), and Porcupine Tree's Fear of a Blank Planet.

== Controversies ==
In a 1989 interview with The Washington Times, the interviewing journalist, David Mills, lifted some quotations from a UK magazine in which the band were asked their opinion on the Arab–Israeli conflict. Professor Griff commented that "Jews are responsible for the majority of the wickedness in the world" (p. 177), a quote from The International Jew. Shortly after, Chuck D expressed an apology on his behalf. At a June 21, 1989, press conference, Chuck D announced Griff's dismissal from the group, and a June 28 statement by Russell Simmons, president of Def Jam Recordings and Rush Artists Management, stated that Chuck D. had disbanded Public Enemy "for an indefinite period of time". By August 10, however, Chuck D denied that he had disbanded the group, and stated that Griff had been re-hired as "Supreme Allied Chief of Community Relations" (in contrast to his previous position with the group as Minister of Information). Griff later denied holding antisemitic views and apologized for the remarks. Several people who had worked with Public Enemy expressed concern about Chuck D's leadership abilities and role as a social spokesman.

In his 2009 book, entitled Analytixz, Griff criticized his 1989 statement: "to say the Jews are responsible for the majority of wickedness that went on around the globe I would have to know about the majority of wickedness that went on around the globe, which is impossible ... I'm not the best knower. Then, not only knowing that, I would have to know who is at the crux of all of the problems in the world and then blame Jewish people, which is not correct." Griff also said that not only were his words taken out of context, but that the recording has never been released to the public for an unbiased listen.

The controversy and apologies on behalf of Griff spurred Chuck D to reference the negative press they were receiving. In 1990, Public Enemy issued the single "Welcome to the Terrordome", which contains the lyrics: "Crucifixion ain't no fiction / So-called chosen frozen / Apologies made to whoever pleases / Still they got me like Jesus". These lyrics have been described by rock critic Robert Christgau as antisemitic, making supposed references to the concept of the "chosen people" with the lyric "so-called chosen" and Jewish deicide with the last line.

The rapper Ice-T addressed the controversy in his track "This One's For Me" on the album The Iceberg/Freedom of Speech... Just Watch What You Say!. He lamented that none of the rappers who had previously allied themselves with Public Enemy during their success was defending Professor Griff during the controversy, claiming that he had been the only one to speak out in Griff's defense.

In 1999, the group released an album entitled There's a Poison Goin' On. The title of the last song on the album is called "Swindler's Lust". The Anti-Defamation League (ADL) claimed that the title of the song was a word play on the title of the Steven Spielberg movie Schindler's List about the genocide of Jews in World War II. Similarly in 2000 a Public Enemy spin off group under the name Confrontation Camp, a name that the ADL saw as a pun on the term concentration camp, released an album. The group consisted of Kyle Jason, Chuck D (under the name Mistachuck) and Professor Griff.

== Group members ==
=== Current members ===
- Chuck D (Carlton D. Ridenhour) – MC
- Flavor Flav (William J. Drayton Jr.) – MC, Hype man, multi-instrumentalist
- DJ Johnny Juice (John Rosado) – Musical Director, Music Producer, DJ, percussionist
- Brian Hardgroove – drums, percussion
- Jahi – Background Vocals, DJ
- S1W
  - James Bomb (James Allen)
  - Pop Diesel (John Butch Oliver)

=== Legacy Members ===
- Terminator X (Norman Rogers) – DJ, Producer
- Professor Griff (Richard Griffin) – Minister of Information
- Sister Souljah (Lisa Williamson) – Minister of Information (took over Richard Griffin's place when Griffin left group)
- Brian Hardgroove – Bandleader, bass, guitars
- Khari Wynn - Guitars
- Michael Faulkner – drums, percussion
- T-Bone Motta – drums, percussion
- Davy DMX (David Franklin Reeves Jr.) – bass
- DJ Lord (Lord Aswod) – DJ
- S1W
  - Brother James (James Norman)
  - Brother Mike (Michael Williams)
  - Jacob "Big Jake" Shankle
  - Brother Roger (Roger Chillous)
  - The Interrogator (Shawn K. Carter)
  - Big Casper (Tracy D. Walker)
- The Bomb Squad
  - Hank Shocklee (James Hank Boxley III) *original member
  - Keith Shocklee (Keith Boxley) *original member
  - Eric "Vietnam" Sadler *original member
  - Gary G-Wiz (Gary Rinaldo) (took Eric Sadler's place when Sadler left group)

== Discography ==
Studio albums

- Yo! Bum Rush the Show (1987)
- It Takes a Nation of Millions to Hold Us Back (1988)
- Fear of a Black Planet (1990)
- Apocalypse 91... The Enemy Strikes Black (1991)
- Muse Sick-n-Hour Mess Age (1994)
- There's a Poison Goin' On (1999)
- Revolverlution (2002)
- New Whirl Odor (2005)
- How You Sell Soul to a Soulless People Who Sold Their Soul??? (2007)
- Most of My Heroes Still Don't Appear on No Stamp (2012)
- The Evil Empire of Everything (2012)
- Man Plans God Laughs (2015)
- Nothing Is Quick in the Desert (2017)
- Loud Is Not Enough (2020) (released under the name Enemy Radio)
- What You Gonna Do When the Grid Goes Down? (2020)
- Black Sky Over the Projects: Apartment 2025 (2025)

Collaborative albums

- Rebirth of a Nation (with Paris) (2006)

Soundtrack albums

- He Got Game (1998)

== Awards and nominations ==
=== Grammy Awards ===
Year	Nominated work	Award	Result
1990	"Fight the Power"	Best Rap Performance by a Duo or Group	Nominated
1991	Fear of a Black Planet	Best Rap Performance by a Duo or Group	Nominated
1992	Apocalypse 91... The Enemy Strikes Black	Best Rap Performance by a Duo or Group	Nominated
1993	Greatest Misses	Best Rap Performance by a Duo or Group	Nominated
1995	"Bring the Noise" (with Anthrax)	Best Metal Performance	Nominated

=== American Music Awards ===
Year	Nominated work	Award	Result
1989	It Takes a Nation of Millions to Hold Us Back	Favorite Rap/Hip-Hop Album	Nominated
1991	Fear of a Black Planet	Favorite Rap/Hip-Hop Album	Nominated
1992	Apocalypse 91... The Enemy Strikes Black	Favorite Rap/Hip-Hop Album	Nominated

=== Rock and Roll Hall of Fame ===
Public Enemy was inducted into the Rock and Roll Hall of Fame in 2013.

== Bibliography ==
- Chang, Jeff (2005). Can't Stop Won't Stop: A History of the Hip-Hop Generation. New York: Picador. ISBN 0-312-42579-1.
- Chuck D: Lyrics of a Rap Revolutionary, Off Da Books, 2007 ISBN 0-9749484-1-1
- Chuck D with Yusuf Jah, Fight the Power, Delacorte Press, 1997 ISBN 0-385-31868-5
- Fuck You Heroes, Glen E. Friedman Photographs 1976–1991, Burning Flags Press, 1994, ISBN 0-9641916-0-1
- Serpick, Evan. "Public Enemy Look Back at 20 Years of 'By the Time I Get to Arizona'." Spin. Spin, November 10, 2011. Web.
- White, Miles. Race, Rap and the performance of Mascinity in American Popular Culture. 2011. University of Illinois. Urbana. ISBN 978-0-252-07832-3
