= There's a Poison Goin' On =

There's a POISON Goin' On...

Studio album by Public Enemy
- Released: July 20, 1999
- Recorded: 1998–1999
- Genres: Political hip-hop; hardcore hip-hop
- Length: 51:45
- Labels: Play It Again Sam, Atomic Pop
- Producers: Tom E. Hawk, Flavor Flav

Public Enemy chronology
He Got Game (1998)	There's a POISON Goin' On... (1999)	Revolverlution (2002)

Singles from There's a Poison Goin' On
- 1. "Do You Wanna Go Our Way???" Released: September 1999

There's a Poison Goin' On is the seventh studio album by American hip hop group Public Enemy, released July 20, 1999, on Atomic Pop Records in the United States. Its title is adapted from the title of Sly & the Family Stone's album There's a Riot Goin' On (1971). The album was originally made available via Internet on May 18, 1999, via the now defunct Atomic Pop website.

== Critical reception ==
Professional ratings
Review scores
Source	Rating
AllMusic	3.5/5 stars
Alternative Press	4/5 stars
The Austin Chronicle	3.5/5 stars
Los Angeles Times	3/4 stars
Muzik	5/5 stars
NME	4/10
Rolling Stone	3.5/5 stars
The Rolling Stone Album Guide	2.5/5 stars
Spin	5/10
USA Today	3/4 stars

In a positive review, Alternative Press said There's a Poison Goin' On worked "best as an eyes-closed, headphones on high-volume experience. It takes extremely seriously the idea that hip hop should be consciousness-altering music", while Greg Kot wrote in Rolling Stone, "there is some jigginess on this record....the emphasis is on sparser, more spacious mixes- less claustrophobic and dizzying...but still gripping." The Wire deemed the album a comeback for Public Enemy and the group's most abrasive work since Fear of a Black Planet (1990). Muzik found the music not only abrasive but also "defiant" and "provocative ... vintage PE, all the more welcome at a time when there had seemed to be no one left who was prepared to make rational, thoughtful, incisive hip-hop." Robert Christgau was less enthusiastic in his consumer guide for The Village Voice, offering the one-line quip, "hating playas is fine, hating play amn't". He cited "41:19" and "What What" as highlights and gave the album a one-star honorable mention, which indicated "a worthy effort consumers attuned to its overriding aesthetic or individual vision may well like".

== Controversy ==
In June 1999, the Anti-Defamation League (ADL) claimed that "Swindler's Lust" was "offensive", "outrageous", and "suggestive of age-old anti-Semitic themes and rhetoric". The organization sent a letter to Atomic Pop saying there were "classic anti-Semitic code words" and accusations toward "Jews for the plight of financially underprivileged Blacks" on the song, which was titled as a word play on the title of the 1993 Holocaust film Schindler’s List. The record label responded in a letter stating the song had "no anti-Semitic references".

== Track listing ==
1. "Dark Side of the Wall: 2000" – 1:36
2. "Do You Wanna Go Our Way???" – 3:56
3. "LSD" – 3:30
4. "Here I Go" – 3:05
5. "41:19" – 3:57
6. "Crash" – 3:48
7. "Crayola" – 3:30
8. "First the Sheep, Next the Shepherd?" – 3:17
9. "World Tour Sessions" – 4:27
10. "Last Mass of the Caballeros" – 3:56
11. "I" – 4:30
12. "What What" – 5:02
13. "Kevorkian" – 2:37
14. "Swindlers Lust" – 5:23

Bonus tracks

The album was reissued in 2004 via Koch with bonus tracks.

1. "Do You Wanna Go Our Way??? (Nextmen UK Mixx)" – 4:18
2. "Here I Go (Commissioned Mixx DJ Johnny Juice Vacation in Vietnam Florida Mix)" – 3:20
3. "World Tour Sessions (G Wiz Black Planet Tour Mix)" – 3:35
4. "I (Eye for an Eye Mixx)" – 5:43
5. "Kill em Live" – 3:25
