= Revolverlution =

Studio album by Public Enemy
- Released: July 23, 2002
- Genres: Political hip hop; hardcore hip hop
- Length: 63:53
- Label: Koch
- Producers: The Bomb Squad, Gary G-Wiz, Professor Griff, Public Enemy, Amani K. Smith

Public Enemy chronology
There's a Poison Goin' On (1999)	Revolverlution (2002)	New Whirl Odor (2005)

Revolverlution is the eighth studio album by American hip hop group Public Enemy, released July 23, 2002 on Koch Records in the United States. The album debuted at number 110 on the U.S. Billboard 200 chart. Upon its release, it received generally positive reviews from most music critics, based on an aggregate score of 65/100 from Metacritic. Track number 3 was recorded at Maritime Hall in San Francisco, CA by Nick Baker.

== Reception ==
Professional ratings
Aggregate scores
Source	Rating
Metacritic	65/100
Review scores
Source	Rating
AllMusic	3/5 stars
Chicago Sun-Times	3/4 stars
Los Angeles Times	2.5/4 stars
Mojo	4/5 stars
Pitchfork	6.8/10
Q	3/5 stars
Robert Christgau	A−
Rolling Stone	3/5 stars
Stylus Magazine	C
Vibe	2.5/5 stars

- Rolling Stone (9/5/02, pp. 70,72) - 3 stars out of 5 - "The aural rummage sale brings some timely noise while proving D can still deliver lyrical knocks to the deserving."
- Q (1/03, p. 123) - 3 stars out of 5 - "Bound to satisfy loyal fans."
- Uncut (01/03, p. 126) - 3 stars out of 5 - "Brutally eloquent, anti-authority cyber-funk, PE are still fighting the powers that be."
- Mojo (12/02, p. 122) - "Works very well indeed....Public Enemy are still making music of great substance and potency."
- The Washington Post (9/13/02, p. 15) - "a marvel of snazzy production....musically speaking, the album never loses traction. Therefore, it is dismaying how much the lyrics muck things up....Chuck D. doesn't so much elucidate an issue as present topics of conversation, ladling out generous portions of ad hominem."

== Track listing ==
1. "Gotta Give the Peeps What They Need" – 3:32
2. "Revolverlution" – 3:01
3. "Miuzi Weighs A Ton - Live San Francisco 10/21/1999" – 1:47
4. "Put It Up" – 3:11
5. "Can a Woman Make a Man Lose His Mind?" – 3:34
6. "Public Enemy Service Announcement #1" – 0:21
7. "Fight the Power - Live Winterthur Switzerland 1992" – 3:55
8. "By The Time I Get to Arizona (The Molemen Mixx)" – 3:57
9. "Post-Concert Arizona Interview (U2 Zoo Tour)" – 1:03
10. "Son of a Bush" – 5:52
11. "54321... Boom" – 3:37
12. "Welcome to the Terrordome - Live Winterthur Switzerland 1992" – 3:38
13. "B Side Wins Again (Scattershot Remix)" – 4:54
14. "Get Your Shit Together" – 4:47
15. "Public Enemy Service Announcement #2" – 0:30
16. "Shut 'Em Down (The Functionist Version)" – 5:28
17. "Now a' Daze" – 3:25
18. "Public Enemy #1 (Jeronimo Punx Redu)" – 4:48
19. "The Making of Burn Hollywood Burn (w/ Big Daddy Kane, Flavor Flav, Chuck D - 1989)" – 2:46
20. "Gotta Give The Peeps What They Need (DJ Johnny Juice - Paris Revolverlutionary Mix)" – 3:30
21. "What Good Is a Bomb" – 6:17

Bonus track

1. "Public Enemy #1 (Dimension Zero Remix)" - 6:12 (Bonus Track Japanese Release)

== Personnel ==
Credits for Revolverlution adapted from Allmusic.

- The 7th Octave – bass, guitar, performer
- Johnny "Juice" Rosado – producer, engineer, mixing, scratches, remixing, musician
- C Doc – editing, mastering
- Michael Closter – executive producer
- Albie Cora – engineer, remixing, mixing
- Gary G-Wiz – producer, executive producer
- Randy Glaude – bass, guitar, musician
- Earle Holder – Mastering Engineer
- Walter Leapheart – executive producer
- William March – vocals (background)
- Mista Chuck – arranger
- Andrea (Triniti) Coclough – engineer, editing, mixing
- Paul Mooney – vocals, introduction
- John Penn II – engineer
- Carl Ryder – executive producer
- Eddy Schreyer – mastering
- Kavon Shah – bass, guitar, musician
- Amani K. Smith – producer
- Ryan J-W Smith – remixing, drum programming
- Ryan Smith – drum programming
- Jeff Snyder – bass, guitar, remixing, drum programming
- Khari Wynn – musician

== Chart history ==
Chart (2002)	Peak position
U.S. Billboard 200	110
U.S. Top R&B/Hip-Hop Albums	16
U.S. Independent Albums	4
