= New Whirl Odor =

Studio album by Public Enemy
- Released: November 1, 2005
- Genres: Political hip-hop, East Coast hip-hop, hardcore hip-hop
- Length: 57:51
- Label: Slam Jamz
- Producers: Abnormal, C-Doc (The Warhammer), Moby, Johnny Juice Rosado, Professor Griff

Public Enemy chronology
Revolverlution (2002)	New Whirl Odor (2005)	Rebirth of a Nation (2006)

Professional ratings
Review scores
Source	Rating
AllMusic	2/5 stars
Entertainment Weekly	B
Mojo	4/5 stars
Pitchfork	5.9/10
PopMatters	3/10
RapReviews	8/10
Robert Christgau	(2-star Honorable Mention)
Rolling Stone	2.5/5 stars
Tom Hull – on the Web	A−

New Whirl Odor is the ninth studio album by American hip-hop group Public Enemy, released in the U.S. on November 1, 2005. The title is a pun on the New World Order conspiracy theory. "MKLVFKWR (Make Love, Fuck War)" features the artist Moby.

== Reception ==
- Entertainment Weekly (No. 848, p. 77) - "[I]t's refreshing to hear Public Enemy frontman Chuck D's stentorian voice hectoring, indicting, and pontificating on New Whirl Odor like it was 1989 all over again." - Grade: B
- Mojo (p. 120) - 4 stars out of 5 -- "Anyone needing passionate music that's both socially and politically engaged need look no further."
- Mojo (p. 60) - Ranked #2 in Mojo's "Top Ten Urban Albums of 2005."

== Track listing ==
#	Title	Time
1	...And No One Broadcasted Louder Than... (Intro)	0:33
2	New Whirl Odor	3:24
3	Bring That Beat Back	4:17
4	66.6 Strikes Again	1:45
5	MKLVFKWR ("Make Love, Fuck War") (featuring Moby)	3:24
6	What a Fool Believes	3:07
7	Makes You Blind	5:34
8	Preachin' to the Quiet	4:27
9	Either We Together or We Ain't	1:44
10	Revolution (featuring Society)	4:19
11	Check What You're Listening To	5:46
12	As Long as the People Got Somethin' to Say	3:23
13	Y'all Don't Know	4:01
14	Either You Get It By Now or You Don't	1:15
15	Superman's Black in the Building	11:50
