= He Got Game (soundtrack) =

1998 soundtrack album by Public Enemy

Soundtrack album / Studio album by Public Enemy
- Released: April 28, 1998
- Recorded: June 1997 – February 1998
- Genres: Hardcore hip hop; conscious hip hop
- Length: 48:10
- Label: Def Jam
- Producers: Abnes Dubose; the Bomb Squad; Danny Saber; D. R. Period; Jack Dangers

Public Enemy chronology
| Muse Sick-n-Hour Mess Age (1994) | He Got Game (1998) | There's a Poison Goin' On (1999) |

Singles from He Got Game
- 1. "He Got Game" Released: May 2, 1998

He Got Game is a soundtrack and sixth studio album by American hip hop group Public Enemy, released on April 28, 1998, under Def Jam Recordings. It was released as the soundtrack to Spike Lee's 1998 film of the same name and was the group's last album for Def Jam until 2020's What You Gonna Do When the Grid Goes Down?. He Got Game was produced by members of the Bomb Squad, along with producers Abnes Dubose, Danny Saber, D. R. Period, and Jack Dangers.

The album sold poorly upon its release and peaked at number 26 on the Billboard 200. Its single, the title track, peaked within the top 20 of the charts in the United Kingdom, where the album peaked at number 50 on the UK Albums Chart. He Got Game was well received by music critics, who praised its melodic sound and Chuck D's lyrics.

== Background ==
He Got Game served as the soundtrack to Spike Lee's 1998 basketball drama of the same name. A film score of the same name, featuring music composed by Aaron Copland, was also released on April 21.

After a four-year hiatus by the group, Professor Griff and The Bomb Squad reunited with Public Enemy for the album, which features political, sports-derived imagery by Chuck D. According to critic Armond White, He Got Game uses basketball as a metaphor for "the essence of black male aspiration. Disproving the film's suggestion of b-ball as an easy passport out of the ghetto, [Public Enemy] challenge trite assumptions about black luck and skill". The album's production features backup female vocals, church-like chorales, austere beats, strings, and funk samples. The title track overtly interpolates Buffalo Springfield's 1966 song "For What It's Worth," and its vocalist Stephen Stills makes an appearance on the song. It was released as He Got Game's only single in May 1998.

== Commercial performance ==
He Got Game debuted at number 26 on the US Billboard 200 chart on May 11, 1998, and sold 46,282 copies in its first week. Despite hip hop music's increased commercial viability at the time, the album had fallen out of the top 100 by July. In an article for the Los Angeles Times, Robert Hilburn opined that its "relatively lackluster showing" with consumers was due to Public Enemy's image and lyrical content rather than the album's quality:

Rap audiences tend to be young and want their own heroes. For all its respect, PE is associated with another era in rap. The music, too, may be too restrained for the thug-life tone favored by today's mass rap audience.

In the United Kingdom, He Got Game peaked at number 50 on the UK Albums Chart, while the title track reached number 16 on the singles chart; it did not chart on the US Hot 100.

== Critical reception ==
Professional ratings
Review scores
| Source | Rating |
|---|---|
| Allmusic | 4/5 stars |
| The Atlanta Journal-Constitution | A− |
| Chicago Sun-Times | 4/4 stars |
| Christgau's Consumer Guide | A |
| Detroit Free Press | 3/4 stars |
| Entertainment Weekly | B+ |
| Los Angeles Times | 3/4 stars |
| Rolling Stone | 3.5/5 stars |
| Spin | 8/10 |

He Got Game was well received by music critics. In his review for Rolling Stone magazine, Scott Poulson-Bryant called the album "dense and eclectic, brilliant at moments but sometimes confusing," and found Chuck D to be "inspired again, coming up with blues poetry for the hoops age." Keith Phipps of The A.V. Club felt that, despite occasionally uninformed "lyrical snippets", most of the album has "the sense of urgency and menace that characterized PE's best work ... and the reformed Bomb Squad's sound has expanded in some interesting directions."

In his review for the Chicago Sun-Times, Jim DeRogatis called He Got Game "as hard-hitting as anything PE has done" and said that the group "nods to current tastes with more melodic hooks and less white noise than it has offered in the past." Music critic Robert Christgau credited Chuck D for realizing "the soundtrack concept" and viewed that, although only the Danny Saber and Jack Dangers-produced "Go Cat Go" resembles "the stressful speed of classic PE", the hooks are appropriated "subtly" and "brilliantly". Christgau named it the eighth best album of the year in his list for The Village Voice's Pazz & Jop critics' poll.

== Track listing ==
| No. | Title | Writer(s) | Producer(s) | Length |
|---|---|---|---|---|
| 1. | "Resurrection" (featuring Masta Killa) | Chuck D, Masta Killa; DR Period; Hank Shocklee; Keith Shocklee | D. R. Period; Hank Shocklee; Keith Shocklee | 4:20 |
| 2. | "He Got Game" (featuring Stephen Stills; incorporates elements of Buffalo Springfield's "For What It's Worth") | Chuck D; Stephen Stills | D. R. Period; Hank Shocklee; Keith Shocklee | 4:46 |
| 3. | "Unstoppable" (featuring KRS-One) | Chuck D; Gary G-Wiz; KRS-One | Gary G-Wiz | 3:14 |
| 4. | "Shake Your Booty" | Leon Huff; Ron McNair | D. R. Period; Hank Shocklee; Keith Shocklee | 3:45 |
| 5. | "Is Your God a Dog" | Corey Brewer; Chuck D; Abnes Dubose | Corey Brewer; Abnes (Abnormal) Dubose | 5:08 |
| 6. | "House of the Rising Son" | Chuck D; Pete Townshend; Kerwin Young | Kerwin Young; Gary G-Wiz | 3:16 |
| 7. | "Revelation 33 1/3 Revolutions" | Chuck D | Minnesota; Hank Shocklee; Keith Shocklee | 4:11 |
| 8. | "Game Face" (featuring Smoothe da Hustler) | Smoothe Da Hustler; Monty Norman | D. R. Period; Hank Shocklee; Keith Shocklee | 3:17 |
| 9. | "Politics of the Sneaker Pimps" | Chuck D; Gary G-Wiz | Gary G-Wiz | 3:16 |
| 10. | "What You Need Is Jesus" | Chuck D; Gary G-Wiz | Gary G-Wiz | 3:29 |
| 11. | "Super Agent" | Chuck D; Abnes Dubose | Abnes (Abnormal) Dubose | 3:35 |
| 12. | "Go Cat Go" | Chuck D; Jack Dangers; Danny Saber | Jack Dangers; Danny Saber | 3:48 |
| 13. | "Sudden Death (Interlude)" | Kerwin Young | Kerwin Young | 2:04 |

== Personnel ==
Credits for He Got Game adapted from Allmusic.

- 4Kast – backing vocals
- Leonard Bernstein – conductor
- Corey Brewer – associate producer
- Alice Butts – design
- Chris Champion – engineer
- Aaron Copland – conductor
- Jack Dangers – scratching, programming, producer, emax
- Dolo – engineer
- Abnes Dubose – producer
- (Ex) Cat Heads – executive producer
- Paul Falcone – engineer
- Gary G-Wiz – producer
- Reeves Gabrels – guitar
- Ben Garrison – engineer
- Gerard Gashkin – photography
- Rawle Gittens – engineer
- Rasheed Goodlowe – engineer
- Bill Green – executive in charge of music
- Charles Harbutt – engineer
- Chris Haynes – engineer
- David Lee – photography
- Spike Lee – liner notes, executive producer
- Ken Lewis – mixing
- Paul Logus – guitar, engineer, mixing
- London Symphony Orchestra – performer
- Ricco Lumpkins – engineer
- Jonathan Mannion – photography
- Kathy Nelson – executive producer, executive in charge of music
- New York Philharmonic – performer
- Joseph M. Palmaccio – mastering
- Gordon Parks – photography
- John Penn II – engineer
- David Phelps – guitar
- Philharmonia Orchestra – performer
- Tony Prendatt – engineer, mixing
- Mario Rodriguez – mixing
- Johnny Juice Rosado – scratching
- Danny Saber – programming, producer
- Eric "Vietnam" Sadler – production consultant
- Gary Schultz – producer
- Shabach Community Choir – choir, chorus
- Hank Shocklee – producer, executive producer
- Keith Shocklee – producer
- Alex Steyermark – music supervisor
- Ted Wohlsen – engineer
- Kerwin Young – bass, keyboards, producer

== Charts ==
Chart performance for He Got Game
| Chart (1998) | Peak position |
|---|---|
| Australian Albums (ARIA) | 54 |
| Dutch Albums (Album Top 100) | 98 |
| German Albums (Offizielle Top 100) | 81 |
| UK Albums Chart | 50 |
| US Billboard 200 | 26 |
| US Top R&B/Hip-Hop Albums | 10 |

== Bibliography ==
- Christgau, Robert (2000). Christgau's Consumer Guide: Albums of the '90s. Macmillan. ISBN 0312245602.
- Strong, Martin C. (2004). The Great Rock Discography (7th ed.). Canongate U.S. ISBN 1841956155.
