= Dead Enz Kidz Doin' Lifetime Bidz =

Studio album by Young Black Teenagers
- Released: February 2, 1993
- Recorded: 1992
- Genre: Hip hop
- Length: 42:09
- Label: MCA
- Producer: Hank Shocklee (exec.); Gary G-Wiz; Grandmaster Flash; Keith Shocklee; Kerwin Young; Paul Shabazz; Terminator X; Kamron

Young Black Teenagers chronology
Young Black Teenagers (1991)	Dead Enz Kidz Doin' Lifetime Bidz (1993)

Singles from Dead Enz Kidz Doin' Lifetime Bidz
- 1. "Tap the Bottle" Released: November 24, 1992; 2. "Roll w/ the Flavor" Released: April 20, 1993

Professional ratings
Review scores
Source	Rating
AllMusic	3/5 stars
Chicago Tribune	2/4 stars

Dead Enz Kidz Doin' Lifetime Bidz is the second and final studio album by American hip hop group Young Black Teenagers. It was released on February 2, 1993, via Sound of Urban Listeners (SOUL)/MCA Records. The album was produced by Gary G-Wiz, Keith Shocklee, Grandmaster Flash, Kerwin "Sleek" Young, Paul Shabazz, and Terminator X, with Hank Shocklee serving as executive producer. It peaked at number 158 on the Billboard 200 in the United States.

Its lead single "Tap the Bottle" peaked at number 55 on the Billboard Hot 100 and number 6 on the Hot Rap Songs, making it the group's biggest hit. The second single, "Roll With the Flavor", made it to #22 on the Hot Rap Singles. The group went on to produce a third album that was never released due to a conflict of interest with Hank Shocklee and their management. They would disband two years later.

== Composition ==
The Bomb Squad's production on this album is noted for its extensive sampling, including prominent samples of the Rolling Stones' "Monkey Man", Rush's "Tom Sawyer" and Herbie Hancock's "Watermelon Man". Regarding the sampling of Rush's "Tom Sawyer", YBT stated, "it's the phattest shit and it deserves to be rekindled".

== Track listing ==
No.	Title	Writer(s)	Producer(s)	Length
1.	"In the House"		Gary G-Wiz; Keith Shocklee	0:32
2.	"Tap the Bottle"	Adam Michael Weiner; Ronald Knute Winge; Shorty; Flex; Norman Rogers	Terminator X	4:00
3.	"Roll w/ the Flavor"	Weiner; Winge; ATA; Gary Rinaldo; Keith Boxley; Ronald Les Albert Simpson	Gary G-Wiz; Keith Shocklee	3:26
4.	"Sweatin' Me"	Weiner; Winge; ATA; Knowledgable Child; Rinaldo; Boxley	Gary G-Wiz; Keith Shocklee	4:16
5.	"Plead the Fifth"	Weiner; Winge; Kerwin E. Young; Paul Stewart	Kerwin "Sleek" Young; Paul Shabazz	2:44
6.	"Soul Wide Open"	Weiner; Winge; Rinaldo; Boxley	Gary G-Wiz; Keith Shocklee	4:41
7.	"Blowin' Up the Spot"	Weiner; Winge; ATA	Gary G-Wiz; Keith Shocklee; DJ Kamron (co.)	4:03
8.	"Y.B. Teenagers"	Weiner; Winge; ATA; Rinaldo; Boxley	Gary G-Wiz; Keith Shocklee	4:10
9.	"On the DL (Down Low)"	Weiner; Winge; Rinaldo	Gary G-Wiz; Keith Shocklee	3:59
10.	"Looney Toonz"	Weiner; Winge; ATA; Rinaldo; Boxley	Gary G-Wiz; Keith Shocklee	4:08
11.	"Outta My Head"	Weiner; Winge; Joseph Saddler	Grandmaster Flash	3:14
12.	"Back for Your Head"		Gary G-Wiz; Keith Shocklee	0:47
13.	"First True Love Affair"	Weiner; Winge; ATA; Rinaldo; Boxley	Gary G-Wiz; Keith Shocklee	3:37
14.	"Time to Make the Dough Nutz"	Weiner; Winge; ATA; Thomas Joseph Barbaccia; Rinaldo; Boxley	Gary G-Wiz; Keith Shocklee	3:51
Total length:				42:09

== Personnel ==
- Adam "Firstborn" Weiner – main artist, songwriter
- Ron "Kamron" Winge – main artist, songwriter
- Ata – main artist, songwriter (tracks: 3, 4, 7, 8, 10, 13, 14)
- Thomas "Tiny" Barbaccia – main artist, songwriter (track 14)
- Scott "DJ Skribble" Ialacci – main artist, scratches (track 2)
- Flex – songwriter (track 2)
- Shorty – songwriter (track 2)
- Knowledgable Child – songwriter (track 4)
- Sha Sha Devitt – backing vocals (track 13)
- Gary "G-Wiz" Rinaldo – producer (tracks: 1, 3, 4, 6–10, 12–14), songwriter (tracks: 3, 4, 6, 8–10, 13, 14)
- Keith "Shocklee" Boxley – producer (tracks: 1, 3, 4, 6–10, 12–14), songwriter (tracks: 3, 4, 6, 8, 10, 13, 14)
- Norman "Terminator X" Rogers – producer & songwriter (track 2)
- Kerwin E. "Sleek" Young – producer & songwriter (track 5)
- Paul Shabazz – producer & songwriter (track 5)
- Joseph "Grandmaster Flash" Saddler – producer & songwriter (track 11)
- Alan Gregorie – engineering, mixing
- Nick Sansano – engineering, mixing
- John Bradley – engineering, mixing
- Gregg Mann – engineering, mixing
- Bob Fudjinski – engineering, mixing assistant
- Chris Flam – engineer, mixing assistant
- Hoover Le – engineering, mixing assistant
- Robert Caprio – engineering
- Vladimir Meller – mastering
- Vic Anesini – mastering
- Hank Shocklee – executive producer
- Cesar Vera – photography
- Herbie Hancock – synthesizer

== Chart history ==
Chart (1993)	Peak position
US Billboard 200	158
US Top R&B/Hip-Hop Albums (Billboard)	56
