= Don't Be Afraid (Aaron Hall song) =

Single by Aaron Hall

from the album Juice and The Truth
- Released: March 31, 1992
- Recorded: October 1991
- Genre: New jack swing
- Length: 5:19 (LP version); 4:50 (single version)
- Label: MCA
- Songwriters: Aaron Hall; Floyd F. Fisher
- Producers: Gary G-Wiz; Hank Shocklee; The Bomb Squad(Nasty Man's Groove remix)

Aaron Hall singles chronology
"Don't Be Afraid" (1992)	"Get A Little Freaky With Me" (1993)

"Don't Be Afraid" is a song by American singer Aaron Hall. It was produced by Hank Shocklee and Gary G-Wiz. It was one of the singles taken from the soundtrack for the 1992 film Juice starring 2Pac. The song's drum loop is sampled from "Sing a Simple Song" by Sly and the Family Stone.

== Background ==
The song has four versions. The original up-tempo version featured on the Juice soundtrack, the second called "Jazz You Up version," has a different beat and updated lyrics and instead of the female backing vocals, Aaron sings the respective vocals in their place. The song as a whole was met with controversy due to its overtly sexual nature. In response, an alternate version to the song was released, called the "Sex You Down Some Mo'" and features a slower tempo and different lyrics and a 4th version which is the Nasty Man's Groove version. One version is on the Juice soundtrack, with the Jazz You Up and Sex You Down Some Mo versions featured on Hall's The Truth album the year after and the fourth on the single. A fifth version, the Pressure Point Remix, features on the single.

== Chart performance ==
"Don't Be Afraid" spent two weeks at #1 on the US R&B chart (making it Aaron Hall's highest charting R&B hit) and peaked at #44 on the Billboard Hot 100.

== Charts ==
=== Weekly charts ===
Chart (1992)	Peak position
UK Singles (OCC)	56
UK Dance (Music Week)	11
UK Club Chart (Music Week)	87
US Billboard Hot 100	44
US Hot R&B/Hip-Hop Songs (Billboard)	1

=== Year-end charts ===
Chart (1992)	Position
US Hot R&B/Hip-Hop Songs (Billboard)	17

== In popular culture ==
"Don’t Be Afraid" was featured in the popular video game Grand Theft Auto: San Andreas, playing on fictional new jack swing radio station CSR 103.9.

== See also ==
- List of number-one R&B singles of 1992 (U.S.)
