= Inside of You =

Inside of You may refer to:

- Inside of You, an album by Aaron Hall
- "Inside of You" (Hoobastank song)
- "Inside of You" (The Maine song)
- "Inside of You", a song by the Walker Brothers from the album Lines
- "Inside of You", a song by Ray, Goodman & Brown
- "Inside of You", a song by fictional band Infant Sorrow from the film Forgetting Sarah Marshall
- Inside of You (album)
- Inside of You, a podcast hosted by Michael Rosenbaum
