= Give It Up (Public Enemy song) =

Single by Public Enemy

from the album Muse Sick-n-Hour Mess Age
- Released: August 1994
- Recorded: 1993
- Genre: Hip hop; rap rock
- Length: 4:44
- Label: Def Jam
- Songwriters: Carlton Ridenhour; Gary G-Wiz; Studdah Man; M. Thomas; Alvertis Isbell
- Producer: Gary G-Wiz

Public Enemy singles chronology
"I Stand Accused" (1993)	"Give It Up" (1994)	"What Kind of Power We Got?" (1994)

Music video
- "Give It Up" on YouTube

"Give It Up" is a song by American hip hop group Public Enemy, released in August 1994 by Def Jam Recordings as the first single from their fifth album, Muse Sick-n-Hour Mess Age (1994). It was co-written and produced by Gary G-Wiz, and became their highest-peaking song on the US Billboard Hot 100, reaching number 33. The accompanying music video was nominated for Clip of the Year in the category for Rap at the 1994 Billboard Music Video Awards.

== Critical reception ==
Brad Beatnik from the Record Mirror Dance Update named "Give It Up" Tune of the Week in June 1994, writing, "O Boy, it's such a thrill to hear this bunch again particularly when they come back with something as fresh as this. The combination of Chuck D and Flavor Flav on the mic still sounds totally unique as they lead a fairly laid-back but joyous twanging guitar-flavoured chant about the bad things in life. The Dirty Drums In Memphis Mix emphasises the rhythms and both mixes help put PE back at the top of the rap pack." Tony Cross from Smash Hits gave it a full score of five out of five and named it Best New Single, saying, "'Give It Up' is about destruction on the street: fighting for self-respect and unity against the evils of crack and gratuitous gun violence. This could only be carried off in such a homie party style by a band as masterly as this. As Steve Wright says, this deserves "much respect"!" Charles Aaron from Spin noted, "A groove deep enough to rumble suburban asphalt, a rap deep enough to humble studio gangstas, and the best hoops rhyme of the year".

== Track listing ==
- CD maxi
1. "Give It Up" (Main) – 4:44
2. "Give It Up" (Instrumental) – 4:44
3. "Give It Up" (Dirty Drums In Memphis Mixx) – 5:17
4. "Live And Undrugged Pt. 2" – 2:36
5. "Bedlam 13:13" (Main) – 4:13
6. "Bedlam 13:13" (Instrumental) – 4:13
7. "Harry Allen's Interactive Super Highway Phone Call To Chuck D" – 2:53

== Charts ==
Chart (1994)	Peak position
Australia (ARIA)	16
Finland (Suomen virallinen lista)	16
France (SNEP)	36
Netherlands (Dutch Top 40)	36
Netherlands (Single Top 100)	36
New Zealand (Recorded Music NZ)	14
Switzerland (Schweizer Hitparade)	37
UK Singles (OCC)	18
UK Dance (OCC)	11
UK Dance (Music Week)	11
UK Club Chart (Music Week)	73
US Billboard Hot 100	33
US Hot Rap Singles (Billboard)	5
US Hot R&B Singles (Billboard)	30
US Maxi-Singles Sales (Billboard)	4
