= Bazerk Bazerk Bazerk =

Studio album by Son of Bazerk
- Released: 1991
- Genre: Hip hop
- Label: S.O.U.L./MCA
- Producer: The Bomb Squad

Son of Bazerk chronology
| Bazerk Bazerk Bazerk (1991) | Well Thawed Out (2010) |

Bazerk Bazerk Bazerk (also known as Son of Bazerk Featuring No Self Control and the Band) is an album by the American musical group Son of Bazerk, released in 1991. Frontman Son of Bazerk was backed by No Self Control and the Band.

The group promoted the album by opening for Public Enemy on the Apocalypse '91 tour. The album's first single was "Change the Style". The following year, "What Could Be Better Bi***" appeared on the Juice soundtrack.

Son of Bazerk would not release another album until 2010.

== Production ==
The album was produced by the Bomb Squad. Terminator X also worked on Bazerk Bazerk Bazerk. The songs combined sampling and scratching with live musicians. Michael Hampton contributed guitar parts to some of the tracks.

== Critical reception ==
Professional ratings
Review scores
| Source | Rating |
|---|---|
| AllMusic | 4.5/5 stars |
| The Encyclopedia of Popular Music | 3/5 stars |
| Entertainment Weekly | A |
| Los Angeles Times | 3.5/5 stars |
| MusicHound R&B: The Essential Album Guide | 1.5/5 stars |
| The Tampa Tribune | 3.5/4 stars |
| USA Today | 3.5/4 stars |

Entertainment Weekly called the album "crazy, crazy, crazy with snare drums, string basses, and a myriad of voices lunging from around corners to startle you; there are even guitar solos thrown in for good measure." The New York Times thought that, "with a rhyme style that is as eclectic as all get-out, Bazerk and the No Self Control Band move from hard-core soul, reggae and funk to heavy metal with transitions that seem programmed by an agitated couch potato's remote control button ... Bazerk's rhyme skills, rawness and an admirable willingness to go where no rapper has trod make it all worthwhile." Spin opined that, "stripped of its conceptual coating, this is dance music with a rap brain."

Newsday deemed the album "a '60s soul revue re-born as a noisy and raucous rap posse." The Los Angeles Times concluded that "this scorching hip-hop debut salutes the spirit of James Brown ... The rhythms, rhymes and style changes (doo-wop to reggae) come at you with such speed and authority that it may take two or three listenings before you can even focus on the themes." USA Today called it a "multifaceted hip-hop celebration."

AllMusic wrote: "One of the rowdiest, craziest, noisiest, most animated records the rap world has seen, Bazerk Bazerk Bazerk recalls everything from James Brown to Bad Brains to the Time to King Tubby to ... well, a great number of things—occasionally within the span of one track." MusicHound R&B: The Essential Album Guide thought that the album "has all the elements of its time," but that the songs don't possess any "lasting power."

== Track listing ==
| No. | Title | Length |
|---|---|---|
| 1. | "The Band Gets Swivey on the Wheels" |
| 2. | "Part One" |
| 3. | "Change the Style" |
| 4. | "One Time for the Rebel" |
| 5. | "What Could Be Better Bi***" |
| 6. | "Bang (Get Down, Get Down)!" |
| 7. | "Trapped Inside the Rage of Jahwell" |
| 8. | "Sex Sex & More Sex" |
| 9. | "N-41" |
| 10. | "Are You wit Me" |
| 11. | "J Dubs Theme" |
| 12. | "Lifestyles of the Blacks in the Brick" |
| 13. | "Honesty" |

== Personnel ==
- Son of Bazerk
- Almighty Jahwell
- Cassandra (MC Halfpint)
- Daddy Rawe
- Sandman
