= Greatest Misses (Public Enemy album) =

Compilation album by Public Enemy
- Released: September 15, 1992
- Studio: The Music Palace (West Hempstead, New York)
- Genres: East Coast hip-hop; political hip-hop; hardcore hip-hop
- Length: 50:56
- Labels: Def Jam; Columbia; Sony Music
- Producers: The Bomb Squad; Imperial Grand Ministers Of Funk

Public Enemy chronology
Apocalypse 91... The Enemy Strikes Black (1991)	Greatest Misses (1992)	Muse Sick-n-Hour Mess Age (1994)

Singles from Greatest Misses
- 1. "Hazy Shade of Criminal" Released: 1992

Professional ratings
Review scores
Source	Rating
AllMusic	2.5/5 stars
RapReviews	6.5/10
The New Rolling Stone Album Guide	3/5 stars
The Village Voice	(3-star Honorable Mention)

Greatest Misses is the first compilation album by American hip-hop group Public Enemy. Composed of six new songs, six remixed singles from previous albums and a live performance from the British TV series The Word, it was released on September 15, 1992, through Def Jam/Columbia/Sony Music. Production was handled by The Bomb Squad and Imperial Grand Ministers Of Funk, and remixes were provided by Damon Dollars, Jam Master Jay, Chyskillz, Jeff Trotter, DJ Chuck Chillout, Salaam Remi, Sir Jinx and Greg Beasley.

Promotional flyer for the album

The album peaked at number 13 on the Billboard 200 and number 10 on the Top R&B/Hip-Hop Albums in the United States. It was certified Gold by the Recording Industry Association of America on November 18, 1992 for selling 500,000 units in the US alone. It also made it to number 14 on the UK Albums Chart, number 15 in New Zealand, number 30 in Sweden, number 53 in Germany, number 57 in Australia and number 72 in the Netherlands.

The album's only single, "Hazy Shade of Criminal" (namechecks serial killer Jeffrey Dahmer), reached number 27 in New Zealand. The song "Gett Off My Back" previously appeared on Mo' Money: Original Motion Picture Soundtrack, while the song "Gotta Do What I Gotta Do" later appeared on Music from the Motion Picture Trespass.

The album was nominated for Best Rap Performance by a Duo or Group at the 35th Annual Grammy Awards, but lost to Arrested Development's "Tennessee".

== Track listing ==
Side P
No.	Title	Writer(s)	Producer(s)	Length
1.	"Tie Goes to the Runner"	Carlton Ridenhour; Shaun Stewart	The Bomb Squad; Kerwin "Sleek" Young; Paul Shabazz	4:16
2.	"Hit da Road Jack"	James Boxley; Keith Boxley; Gary Rinaldo	Imperial Grand Ministers Of Funk	4:01
3.	"Gett off My Back"	William Drayton; J. Boxley; K. Boxley; Rinaldo	The Bomb Squad	4:52

Side E
No.	Title	Writer(s)	Producer(s)	Length
4.	"Gotta Do What I Gotta Do"	Ridenhour; J. Boxley; Rinaldo	The Bomb Squad	4:44
5.	"Air Hoodlum"	Ridenhour; J. Boxley; Rinaldo; Dave Clark; Belford Hendricks	Dr. Treble N Mr. Bass For Da Hittmobb	3:44
6.	"Hazy Shade of Criminal"	Ridenhour; Drayton; K. Boxley; Rinaldo; Stuart Robertz	Imperial Grand Ministers Of Funk	4:54

Side G
No.	Title	Writer(s)	Remixer(s)	Length
7.	"Megablast" (The Madd Skillz Bass Pipe Gett Off Remixx)	Ridenhour; Drayton; J. Boxley	Damon Dollars	3:00
8.	"Louder Than a Bomb" (JMJ Telephone Tap Groove)	Ridenhour; J. Boxley; Eric Sadler	Jam Master Jay; Chyskillz	3:37
9.	"You're Gonna Get Yours" (Reanimated TX Getaway Version)	Ridenhour; J. Boxley	Jeff Trotter	4:10

Side M
No.	Title	Writer(s)	Remixer(s)	Length
10.	"How to Kill a Radio Consultant" (The DJ Chuck Chillout Mega Murder Boom)	Ridenhour; Rinaldo; Robertz; Cerwin Depper	DJ Chuck Chillout; Salaam Remi	4:02
11.	"Who Stole the Soul?" (Sir Jinx Stolen Souled Out Reparation Mixx)	Ridenhour; K. Boxley; Sadler	Sir Jinx	3:39
12.	"Party for Your Right to Fight" (Blak Wax Metromixx)	Ridenhour; J. Boxley; Sadler	Greg Beasley	5:52

No.	Title	Writer(s)	Length
13.	"Shut 'Em Down" (Live in the UK)	Ridenhour; Rinaldo; Robertz; Depper	4:46
Total length:			50:56

Notes

- Track 13 does not appear on original vinyl issues of the album.

== Charts ==
=== Weekly charts ===
Chart (1992)	Peak position
Australian Albums (ARIA)	57
Dutch Albums (Album Top 100)	72
German Albums (Offizielle Top 100)	53
New Zealand Albums (RMNZ)	15
Swedish Albums (Sverigetopplistan)	30
UK Albums (Official Charts)	14
US Billboard 200	13
US Top R&B/Hip-Hop Albums (Billboard)	10

=== Year-end charts ===
Chart (1992)	Position
US Top R&B/Hip-Hop Albums (Billboard)	100

== Certifications ==
Region	Certification	Certified units/sales
United States (RIAA)	Gold	500,000^{^}
^{^} Shipments figures based on certification alone.
