= Long and Whining Road =

2007 song by Public Enemy

Song by Public Enemy

from the album How You Sell Soul to a Soulless People Who Sold Their Soul?
- Released: July 14, 2007 (vinyl); August 18, 2012 (digital download)
- Genre: Hip hop
- Length: 4:24
- Label: SLAMjamz Records
- Songwriters: Chuck D; Flavor Flav; Gary G-Wiz
- Producer: Gary G-Wiz

Public Enemy chronology
"Amerikan Gangster" (2007)	"Long and Whining Road" (2007)	"Say It Like It Really Is" (2010)

"Long and Whining Road" is a song by American hip hop group Public Enemy that appears as the 16th track on their 20th anniversary album How You Sell Soul to a Soulless People Who Sold Their Soul? released in 2007. The song functions as a retrospective of Public Enemy's career, with Chuck D positioning the group as inheritors of the American protest music tradition of the 1960s, particularly by reference to the music of Bob Dylan. The song was produced by Gary G-Wiz.

Although not released as a single, Public Enemy released an official music video for the song, directed by David C. Snyder, in which archival footage of the group performing over the years is juxtaposed with footage of Chuck D lip-syncing the song in the present day.

== Background and composition ==
Chuck D spoke of his admiration for Bob Dylan in an interview with Edna Gundersen in USA Today in 2001: "[Dylan] is stenciled on a lot of aspects of my career - his ability to paint pictures with words, his concerns for society...He taught me to go against the grain". Chuck D also cited the phrase "I'm chillin' like Bob Dylan" as evidence of Dylan's clout in the urban music scene.

In "Long and Whining Road", Chuck D explicitly compares himself to Dylan by referring to himself as the "spokesman for a generation" who is "livin' in the key of protest songs". The song's lyrics chronicle Public Enemy's then 20-year career, from 1987 through the present, while simultaneously paying tribute to Dylan by referencing nearly two dozen of his song and album titles. (For Dylan, the respect was mutual: Dylan had hired Chris Shaw to engineer and mix his song "Things Have Changed" in 1999 based on Shaw's pedigree of having worked on Public Enemy's early albums, and he also wrote admiringly of the group in his 2004 memoir Chronicles: Volume One.)

The lyrics to "Long and Whining Road" contain references to other musicians associated with the 1960s and 1970s (the song's title is a play on The Beatles' "The Long and Winding Road" and it features a prominent sample from Jimi Hendrix's 1970 recording of "Hey Baby") while also criticizing some of the rap acts that followed in Public Enemy's wake: "Damn, our interviews were better than a lot of them acts...Seen the nation reduce "Fight the Power" to "Gin and Juice".

One memorable line addresses Public Enemy's critics while also paying tribute to Dylan's Traveling Wilburys bandmate Tom Petty: "Heard some call me Uncle Tom, now that's petty". After Petty's death in 2017, Chuck D wrote a remembrance of the musician for Billboard magazine in which he explained his intention behind that lyric: "I think the last line was sort of the last wink, like, if you don't get what we do in hip-hop, that we can throw a behind-the-back pass and it's paying homage, but it's done in a fly way".

== Critical reception ==
The song was mentioned as a standout track on How You Sell Soul to a Soulless People Who Sold Their Soul? by several critics who saw its retrospective themes as encapsulating the heart of the album, including The Boston Globe's reviewer who considered it the album's most "essential" track. One critic noted that Chuck D sounded "wistful" while reflecting on 20 years of Public Enemy while another claimed that it was "slightly surreal" to hear him reference his favorite Dylan songs.

When told by an interviewer that some people were likely to be "quite surprised" by all of the Dylan references in the song, Chuck D responded, "If they’re surprised, I don't know if they really follow music (laughs). If anybody's checked Public Enemy out through the years, they know we were DJs who come with a thorough sense of musicology".

== Dylan references ==
The following Bob Dylan album titles and songs are referenced in "Long and Whining Road":

- "The Times They Are a-Changin'"
- Bringing It All Back Home
- "It's Alright, Ma (I'm Only Bleeding)"
- "All Along the Watchtower"
- "Every Grain of Sand"
- "If Not for You"
- Nashville Skyline
- "Girl from the North Country"
- World Gone Wrong
- Blood on the Tracks
- "Like a Rolling Stone"
- "I Threw It All Away"
- "Only a Pawn in Their Game"
- "Tears of Rage"
- "Blowin' in the Wind"
- The Basement Tapes
- "Changing of the Guards"
- Time Out of Mind
- "Tomorrow Is a Long Time"
- "With God on Our Side"
- "Shelter from the Storm"
- "A Hard Rain's a-Gonna Fall"
