= The Truth (Aaron Hall album) =

1993 studio album by Aaron Hall

Studio album by Aaron Hall
- Released: September 28, 1993
- Recorded: 1991–1993
- Genres: R&B; new jack swing; soul
- Length: 62:32
- Label: Silas/MCA
- Producers: Aaron Hall; Gregory Cauthen; Hank Shocklee; Gary G-Wiz

Aaron Hall chronology
The Truth (1993)	Inside of You (1998)

Singles from The Truth
- 1. "Don't Be Afraid" Released: March 31, 1992; 2. "Get a Little Freaky With Me" Released: October 28, 1993; 3. "When You Need Me" Released: February 22, 1994; 4. "I Miss You" Released: April 5, 1994; 5. "Let's Make Love" Released: November 5, 1994

Professional ratings
Review scores
Source	Rating
AllMusic	3/5 stars

The Truth is the debut solo album by American R&B singer Aaron Hall, lead singer of Guy. The album reached #7 on Billboard's Top R&B Albums, #47 on the Billboard 200, and produced five singles: "Don't Be Afraid", "Get a Little Freaky with Me", "Let's Make Love", "I Miss You" and "When You Need Me".

"I Miss You" was the biggest pop hit from the album, peaking at #14 on Billboards Hot 100 and Don't Be Afraid peaked #1 on Billboards Top R&B Songs chart, a number-one hit for two consecutive weeks.

== Track listing ==
No.	Title	Writer(s)	Producer(s)	Length
1.	"Prologue"			0:11
2.	"Do Anything"	Aaron Hall	Vassal Benford	6:22
3.	"Open Up"	Aaron Hall	Gary G-Wiz, Hank Shocklee	4:24
4.	"Get a Little Freaky with Me"	Aaron Hall, Bootsy Collins, George Clinton, Glenn Goins	Aaron Hall, Laney Stewart	4:10
5.	"Pick Up the Phone"	A. Hall, B. Collins, G. Clinton, G. Goins	L. Stewart	4:17
6.	"Don't Be Afraid (Jazz You Up Version)"	Aaron Hall	Gary G-Wiz, H. Shocklee, Christopher Stewart	5:22
7.	"Until I Found You"	Aaron Hall	V. Benford, A. Hall	6:13
8.	"You Keep Me Crying"	Aaron Hall	V. Benford, A. Hall	2:11
9.	"Don't Be Afraid (Interlude)"			0:52
10.	"Don't Be Afraid (Sex You Down Some Mo')"	Aaron Hall	A. Hall, V. Benford, Gary G-Wiz, H. Shocklee	4:32
11.	"Let's Make Love"	Aaron Hall	A. Hall, L. Stewart	6:30
12.	"When You Need Me"	Aaron Hall	V. Benford	5:51
13.	"I Miss You"	Aaron Hall	Gregory Cauthen	6:21
14.	"Until the End of Time"	Aaron Hall	A. Hall, V. Benford	4:46
15.	"Epilogue"			0:30

Notes

- Tracks 4 and 5 contain sample from "Four Play" (George Clinton Jr./Glenn Goins/Bootsy Collins) Bridgeport Music Inc. (BMI)/Rubber Band Music, Inc. (BMI) used by permission. Courtesy of Warner Special Products

== Credits ==
- Coordinator [Production] – Felicia Newsome (tracks: 3)
- Executive-Producer – Louis Silas Jr.
- Mastered by – Herb Powers
- Mixed by – Craig Burbidge (tracks: 13), Jean-Marie Horvat (tracks: 4–7, 11), Kevin Thomas (tracks: 3), Louil Silas, Jr.* (tracks: 2), Vassal Benford (tracks: 2), Victor Flores (tracks: 2, 8, 10, 12, 14)
- Mixed by [Assistant] – David Betancourt (tracks: 4, 5, 7, 11), David Brooks (10) (tracks: 4, 5, 7, 11), Elliot Anders (tracks: 4, 5, 7, 11), Gregg Barrett (tracks: 13), Ray Silva (tracks: 13), Richard Horniblow (tracks: 3), Rolly Ladd (tracks: 2), Willie Will (tracks: 12)
- Production manager – Judi A. Acosta
- Recorded by – Anthony "A.J." Jeffries (tracks: 13), Dave Reitazas (tracks: 10), Jean-Marie Horvat (tracks: 4–7, 11), Kevin Davis (tracks: 4, 5, 7, 11), Kevin Thomas (tracks: 3), Kuk (tracks: 4, 5, 7, 11), Laney Stewart (tracks: 4, 5, 7, 11), Victor Flores (tracks: 2, 8, 12, 14)
- Recorded by [Assistant] – Paul Scalera (tracks: 4, 5, 7, 11), Recorded by [Vocals] – Scott Ralston (tracks: 3)

== Charts ==
=== Weekly charts ===
Chart (1993)	Peak position
US Billboard 200	47
US Top R&B/Hip-Hop Albums (Billboard)	7

=== Year-end charts ===
Chart (1994)	Position
US Top R&B/Hip-Hop Albums (Billboard)	21

=== Singles ===
Year	Title	Hot 100	US R&B
1992	“Don’t Be Afraid”	44	1
1993	"Get A Little Freaky With Me"	-	48
1994	"When You Need Me"	-	30
1994	"Let's Make Love"	-	36
1994	"I Miss You"	14	2
