= I Miss You (Aaron Hall song) =

1994 single by Aaron Hall

Single by Aaron Hall

from the album The Truth
- Released: April 5, 1994
- Recorded: 1993
- Genre: R&B
- Length: 6:22 (album version); 5:24 (long radio edit); 4:54 (short radio edit)
- Label: MCA
- Songwriters: Aaron Hall, Gregory Cauthen

Aaron Hall singles chronology
"Let’s Make Love" (1994)	"I Miss You" (1994)	"When You Need Me" (1994)

Music video
- "I Miss You" on YouTube

"I Miss You" is a song performed and co-written by American R&B musician Aaron Hall, issued as the fourth single from his solo debut album The Truth. The song is his biggest hit to date on the Billboard Hot 100, peaking at #14 in 1994.

== Chart positions ==
=== Weekly charts ===
Chart (1994)	Peak position
US Billboard Hot 100	14
US Hot R&B/Hip-Hop Songs (Billboard)	2
US Rhythmic Top 40 (Billboard)	3

=== Year-end charts ===
Chart (1994)	Position
US Billboard Hot 100	57
US Hot R&B/Hip-Hop Singles & Tracks (Billboard)	6
