= Juice (soundtrack) =

Juice (Original Motion Picture Soundtrack)

Soundtrack album to Juice by various artists
- Released: December 31, 1991
- Recorded: 1991
- Genre: Hip-hop; R&B; new jack swing
- Length: 54:38
- Label: SOUL; MCA
- Producer: Ant Banks; Demetrius Shipp; DJ Muggs; EPMD; Gary G-Wiz; Hank Shocklee; Hurby Luv Bug; Keith Shocklee; Naughty by Nature; Rakim; Rough Daddy Smooth & The Players; Teddy Riley; The Brand New Heavies

Singles from Juice (Original Motion Picture Soundtrack)
- 1. "Uptown Anthem" Released: January 22, 1992; 2. "Juice (Know the Ledge)" Released: February 15, 1992; 3. "Don't Be Afraid" Released: February 1992; 4. "Is It Good to You" Released: 1992

Professional ratings
Review scores
Source	Rating
AllMusic	4/5 stars
Entertainment Weekly	A
Los Angeles Times	3/4 stars
Orlando Sentinel	4/5 stars
RapReviews	8.5/10
Robert Christgau	(neither)
The Source	4/5

Juice (Original Motion Picture Soundtrack) is the soundtrack album to Ernest Dickerson's 1992 crime film Juice. It was released on December 31, 1991, through SOUL/MCA Records and consists mainly of hip-hop and R&B music.

The album peaked at number 17 on the Billboard 200 and number 3 on the Top R&B/Hip-Hop Albums in the United States. On March 4, 1992, the soundtrack was certified gold by the Recording Industry Association of America for selling 500,000 units in the US alone.

The soundtrack spawned four charted singles: "Uptown Anthem", "Juice (Know the Ledge)", "Don't Be Afraid" and "Is It Good to You".

== Track listing ==
No.	Title	Writer(s)	Producer(s)	Length
1.	"Uptown Anthem" (performed by Naughty by Nature)	Vincent Brown; Anthony Criss; Keir Gist	Naughty by Nature	3:04
2.	"Juice (Know the Ledge)" (performed by Eric B. & Rakim)	William Griffin	Rakim	4:01
3.	"Is It Good to You" (performed by Teddy Riley & Tammy Lucas)	Teddy Riley; Tammy Lucas	Teddy Riley	4:17
4.	"Sex, Money & Murder" (performed by M.C. Pooh)	Lawrence Thomas	Ant Banks	2:50
5.	"Nuff' Respect" (performed by Big Daddy Kane)	Antonio Hardy; James Henry Boxley III; Gary Rinaldo; Ali Dee Theodore	Hank Shocklee; Gary G-Wiz	2:58
6.	"So You Want to Be a Gangster" (performed by Too $hort)	Todd Shaw	Ant Banks	4:06
7.	"It's Going Down" (performed by EPMD)	Erick Sermon; Parrish J. Smith	EPMD; Mr. Bozack (co.)	4:13
8.	"Don't Be Afraid" (performed by Aaron Hall)	Aaron Hall; Boxley III; Rinaldo; Floyd Fisher	Hank Shocklee; Gary G-Wiz	5:19
9.	"He's Gamin' On Ya'" (performed by Salt-N-Pepa)	Hurby Azor	Hurby Luv Bug	3:35
10.	"Shoot 'Em Up" (performed by Cypress Hill)	Louis Freese; Senen Reyes; Lawrence Muggerud	DJ Muggs	3:39
11.	"Flipside" (performed by Juvenile Committee)	Ricky Taylor	Demetrius Shipp	4:24
12.	"What Could Be Better Bitch" (performed by Son of Bazerk)	Tony Allen; Boxley III; Keith Matthew Boxley; Rinaldo	Hank Shocklee; Keith Shocklee; Gary G-Wiz (co.); Carl Ryder (co.)	3:01
13.	"Does Your Man Know About Me" (performed by Rahiem)	Guy Williams; Roosevelt Simmons; Michael Bryant	Rough Daddy Smooth & The Players; Tony "Champagne" Silvester (co.)	5:11
14.	"People Get Ready (Remix)" (performed by The Brand New Heavies)	Jan Kincaid; Andrew Levy; Simon Bartholomew; Lascelles Gordon; James Wellman; N'Dea Davenport	The Brand New Heavies	4:00
Total length:				54:38

Other songs

The following songs can be heard in the film, but did not appear in its soundtrack:

- "Pump Me Up" written by James Avery, Robert Reed and Tony Fischer and performed by Trouble Funk and Bobby Torres
- "Word Up" written by Larry Blackmon and Tomi Jenkins and performed by Cameo
- "Bodega Juice" written and performed by Bobby Torres
- "Ooh Aah" written by Richard Walters, Harold Bailey Jr., Alvin Campbell, Ashley Cooper, Franklyn Campbell, Sidonia Thorpe and Louis Marriott and performed by Fabulous Five Inc.
- "How I Could Just Kill a Man" written by Louis Freese, Senen Reyes, Lawrence Muggerud, Lowell Fulson and Jimmy McCracklin and performed by Cypress Hill

== Charts ==
=== Weekly charts ===
Chart (1992)	Peak position
US Billboard 200	17
US Top R&B/Hip-Hop Albums (Billboard)	3

=== Year-end charts ===
Chart (1992)	Position
US Top R&B/Hip-Hop Albums (Billboard)	32

== Certifications ==
Region	Certification	Certified units/sales
United States (RIAA)	Gold	500,000^{^}
^{^} Shipments figures based on certification alone.
