= Keith Shocklee =

- Born: Keith Matthew Boxley; January 2, 1962 (age 64); Roosevelt, New York, U.S.
- Genre: Hip hop
- Occupations: Record producer; DJ
- Formerly of: The Bomb Squad; Public Enemy

Keith Matthew Boxley (born January 2, 1962), better known as Keith Shocklee, Street Element, or Wizard K-Jee, is an American record producer and DJ. He was an original member of Public Enemy and the Bomb Squad. He has contributed his talent to several albums including It Takes a Nation of Millions to Hold Us Back and Fear of a Black Planet. Shocklee also co-produced the singles "Bring the Noise” and "Fight The Power," which were included on Rolling Stone's list of the “500 Greatest Songs Of All Time.”

== Early life ==
Shocklee was born and raised in Roosevelt, New York. He was a childhood friend of rappers Chuck D and Flavor Flav.

== Career ==
Shocklee began his career DJing at various parks, house parties and clubs in New York City during the early 1980s. He also cites Fatback Band's ""King Tim III (Personality Jock)" as the pioneering rap song that triggered his interest in recording. The Bomb Squad's first songs were produced in Shocklee's mother's basement and recorded on tape and acetate. He has since gone on to work with the following recording artists: LL Cool J, Ice Cube, Janet Jackson, Sinéad O'Connor and many other big-name acts. September, 21 2021 Keith announced his own imprint Spectrum City Records and will be releasing new music.

== Discography ==
The 7A3

- Coolin' in Cali (1988)

LL Cool J

- Walking with a Panther (1989)

3rd Bass

- The Cactus Album (1989)

Paula Abdul

- Cold Hearted Quiverin' (1989)

Public Enemy

- Welcome to the Terrordome (1989)
- Fight the Power (1989)
- Fear of a Black Planet (1990)
- He Got Game (1998)

K-9 Posse

- It Gets No Deeper (1989)

Young Black Teenagers

- Nobody Knows Kelli / Proud to be Black (1990)
- Young Black Teenagers (1991)
- Roll with the Flavor (1993)
- Dead Endz Kidz Doin' Lifetime Bidz (1993)

Bell Biv DeVoe

- Poison (1990)
- BBD (I Thought It Was Me)? (1990)
- Let Me Know Something?! (1991)

Ice Cube

- AmeriKKKa's Most Wanted (1990)

Son Of Bazerk

- Change the Style (1991)

Debelah

- Free (1994)

Film & Television Soundtracks

- House Party (1990)
- Juice (1991)
- Mo' Money (1992)
- The Meteor Man (1993)
