= Autobiography of Mistachuck =

Studio album by Chuck D
- Released: October 22, 1996
- Recorded: 1996
- Studio: The Music Palace (New York, NY); Kala (Atlanta, GA); Sonic Sound (Freeport, NY); Platinum Island (New York, NY); Soundtrack (New York, NY)
- Genre: Political hip hop
- Length: 53:18
- Label: Mercury
- Producer: Chuck D (also exec.); Eric "Vietnam" Sadler (also exec.); Gary G-Wiz (also exec.); Abnes "Abnormal" Dubose; Gerald "Soul G" Stevens; Mark Harrison; Kerwin "Sleek" Young; Isaac Hayes

Chuck D chronology
Autobiography of Mistachuck (1996)	The Black in Man (2014)

Singles from Autobiography of Mistachuck
- 1. "No" Released: September 3, 1996

Autobiography of Mistachuck is the debut solo studio album by Public Enemy frontman Chuck D. It was released on October 22, 1996, via Mercury Records. It peaked at No. 190 on the Billboard 200. The album spawned one single, "No”.

== Critical reception ==
Professional ratings
Review scores
Source	Rating
AllMusic	3/5 stars
Robert Christgau	A−
Los Angeles Times	3/4 stars
Muzik	4.5/5 stars
RapReviews	8/10
Rolling Stone	3/5 stars
USA Today	3.5/4 stars

The Los Angeles Times wrote: "Turning to his roots—hard-hitting jazz-funk beats, proud urban poetry, the righteous fire of both the pulpit and the Panthers and an abundance of sports metaphors—he's pounded together a defiantly old-school document that seeks answers for the present in the past." The Toronto Star said that Chuck "sounds in dire need of inspiration, having descended to the depths of rapping about talk shows and hyping his personal 1-800 message line." USA Today determined, that "with hard-driving beats that recall old school soul and funk and a voice that many vocalists would envy, Chuck D is as provocative as ever."

== Track listing ==
No.	Title	Writer(s)	Producer(s)	Length
1.	"Mistachuck"	C. Ridenhour; G. Stevens	Gerald "Soul G." Stevens; Chuck D; Kerwin "Sleek" Young	4:23
2.	"No"	C. Ridenhour; K. Jason; M. Harrison	Mark "Mr. Elite" Harrison; Chuck D	4:32
3.	"Generation Wrekkked"	C. Ridenhour; K. Jason; A. Dubose	Abnes "Abnormal" Dubose; Chuck D	4:05
4.	"Niggativity...Do I Dare Disturb the Universe?"	C. Ridenhour; G. Rinaldo	Gary G-Wiz	4:18
5.	"Free Big Willie"	C. Ridenhour; G. Stevens; C. Jasper; The Isley Brothers	Gerald "Soul G." Stevens; Chuck D; Kerwin "Sleek" Young	4:40
6.	"Horizontal Heroin"	C. Ridenhour; K. Young; R. Griffin	Chuck D; Kerwin "Sleek" Young	1:43
7.	"Talk Show Created the Fool"	C. Ridenhour; A. Dubose; C. Brewser	Abnes "Abnormal" Dubose	5:32
8.	"Underdog"	C. Ridenhour; G. Rinaldo	Gary G-Wiz	4:12
9.	"But Can You Kill the Nigga in You?"	C. Ridenhour; E. Sadler; I. Hayes	Eric "Vietnam" Sadler; Isaac Hayes (co.)	4:59
10.	"Endonesia"	C. Ridenhour; G. Stevens; K. Young; M. Watkins; R. Harding; S. Dash	Gerald "Soul G." Stevens; Chuck D	4:47
11.	"The Pride"	C. Ridenhour; G. Stevens; C. Dehaney; M. Williams	Gerald "Soul G." Stevens; Chuck D; Carl Demann	4:26
12.	"Paid"	C. Ridenhour; G. Rinaldo; K. Walker; M. Key; S. Dash	Gary G-Wiz	5:41
Total length:				53:18

== Charts ==
Chart (1996)	Peak position
US Billboard 200	190
US Top R&B/Hip-Hop Albums (Billboard)	47
