= When You Need Me =

When You Need Me may refer to:

- "When You Need Me" (Aaron Hall song), 1994
- "When You Need Me" (The Mullans song), representing Ireland at Eurovision 1999
- "When You Need Me", a song by Bruce Springsteen from Tracks, 1998
- "When You Need Me", a song by Will Downing, with Chanté Moore, 2000
