= Most of My Heroes Still Don't Appear on No Stamp =

Studio album by Public Enemy
- Released: July 13, 2012
- Genre: Hip-hop
- Length: 48:01
- Labels: Enemy Records, Spit Digital
- Producers: C-Doc, Gary G-Wiz, Z-Trip, Bumpy Knuckles, DJ Pain 1, Divided Souls, Large Professor, Johnny "Juice" Rosado, Sam Sever, R.A.S.

Public Enemy chronology
How You Sell Soul to a Soulless People Who Sold Their Soul??? (2007)	Most of My Heroes Still Don't Appear on No Stamp (2012)	The Evil Empire of Everything (2012)

Singles from Most of My Heroes Still Don't Appear on No Stamp
- 1. "I Shall Not Be Moved" Released: 2012

Most of My Heroes Still Don't Appear on No Stamp is the eleventh studio album by American hip-hop group Public Enemy, released on July 13, 2012, by Slam Jamz. It was sold exclusively at the iTunes Store before its release to other retailers. It was released on CD on November 6. The album is the first of two albums that Public Enemy released in 2012, which Chuck D described as "fraternal twins", along with The Evil Empire of Everything, which was released on October 1, 2012. The album features guest vocals from Brother Ali, Bumpy Knuckles, Cormega, and DMC. The title track "Most of My Heroes Still..." was produced and co-written by Z-Trip.

Upon its release, Most of My Heroes Still Don't Appear on No Stamp received positive reviews from music critics, who complimented its production and found its political lyrics relevant to contemporary times.

The name of the album comes from the line "most of my heroes don't appear on no stamp", from "Fight the Power".

== Critical reception ==
Professional ratings
Review scores
Source	Rating
AllMusic	4/5 stars
Consequence of Sound	3/5 stars
Mojo	4/5 stars
MSN Music (Consumer Guide)	A−
Tom Hull – on the Web	A−

Most of My Heroes Still Don't Appear on No Stamp received generally positive reviews from music critics. AllMusic editor Stephen Thomas Erlewine gave it four out of five stars and commended Public Enemy for "remain[ing] true to the sounds and sensibilities they laid out back in the late '80s", writing that "the music remains vital and vibrant, possibly because, despite some progress, things still haven't changed all that much and, in some respects, have gotten worse...and as long as Public Enemy's heroes remain consigned to the margins, they'll still make music as dynamic as this." Ray Rahman of Entertainment Weekly complimented its production, particularly the "newer, weirder, and welcome musical elements" on certain tracks, and called the album "pretty damn great."

Consequence of Sound's Matt Melis gave the album three stars and felt that "a few cuts [are] completely out of left field", writing that "most of this record falls into tried-and-true PE formulas, but there's no dust or rust to be found on the album's top tracks." MSN Music's Robert Christgau gave it an "A−", indicating "the kind of garden-variety good record that is the great luxury of musical micromarketing and overproduction. Anyone open to its aesthetic will enjoy more than half its tracks." Christgau found it "pretty damn good" and felt that "preacher Chuck needs William Drayton's nuttiness no matter how corrupt it's become, in part because its corruption is a corrective to all of Chuck's conceptualizing." He criticized that, although the album's "young beatmakers echo the old Bomb Squad whomp, the preacher has lost some boom vocally, and like his cadences, the politics are old-school", but "the times justify those old politics more than ever."

== Track listing ==
No.	Title	Producer(s)	Length
1.	"Run Till It's Dark"	C-Doc	3:19
2.	"Get Up Stand Up" (featuring Brother Ali)	Gary G-Wiz	5:04
3.	"Most of My Heroes Still..." (featuring Z-Trip)	Z-Trip	3:32
4.	"I Shall Not Be Moved"	Gary G-Wiz	5:23
5.	"Get It In" (featuring Bumpy Knuckles)	Bumpy Knuckles	3:10
6.	"Hoovermusic"	DJ Pain 1, Divided Souls Entertainment	3:59
7.	"Catch the Thrown" (featuring Large Professor & Cormega)	Large Professor	4:26
8.	"RLTK" (featuring DMC)	Johnny "Juice" Rosado	4:38
9.	"Truth Decay"	Sam Sever	4:11
10.	"Fassfood"	R.A.S.	4:03
11.	"WTF?!"	Clinton Sands	6:22

== Personnel ==
Credits adapted from AllMusic.

- Jamod Allah - Vocals
- B. Dixon - Composer
- Harry Belafonte - Inspiration
- Brother Ali - Featured Artist
- Brother Mike - Unknown Contributor Role
- Bumpy Knuckles - Featured Artist
- Triniti Coclough - Producer, Vocal Producer, Vocal Recording
- Cormega - Featured Artist
- Chuck D - Group Member, Liner Notes
- Davy DMX - Bass
- Eva Rose Demeno - Vocals
- Brent Dixon - Producer
- DJ C-Double - Scratching
- DJ Johnny 'Juice' Rosado - Producer
- DJ Lord - Composer, Group Member, Scratching
- DJ Pain 1 - Producer, Scratching
- Dj Rob Swift - Scratching
- DMC - Featured Artist
- Spent Dnero - Engineer, Mixing
- William Drayton - Executive Producer
- The Enemyboard Vetz - Vocals
- Flavor Flav - Group Member
- Kelvin Fonville - Cover Design
- Freddy Fox - Composer, Mixing, Producer
- Gary G-Wiz - Executive Producer, Producer, Vocal Producer, Vocal Recording
- Piero F. Giunti - Photography
- Micheal Gregoire - Package Design
- Tim Hans - Photography
- James Bomb - Producer, Spoken Word, Unknown Contributor Role
- DJ Johnny Juice - Scratching
- Large Professor - Featured Artist, Producer
- Peter Levin - Claves, Fender Rhodes, Organ
- Paul Logus - Mastering
- Lord Grunge - Vocals
- Lord Kel - Vocals
- Fran Lover - Scratching
- Donald Malloy - Musician
- Jason McClain - Guitar, Mixing
- Jason McLain - Mixing
- Mr. Payback - Instrumentation, Producer
- Chris "Spanky" Moss - Producer
- Buddah Munroe - Mixing
- A. Newman - Composer
- Pop Diesel S1W - Unknown Contributor Role
- Professor Griff - Arranger, Group Member, Producer
- Public Enemy - Primary Artist
- G. Rinaldo - Composer
- Paul Robeson - Inspiration
- Johnny Juice Rosado - Arranger, Editing, Engineer, Mixing, Producer, Vocal Producer, Vocal Recording
- Clint Sands - Engineer, Mixing
- Clint "Mister Payback" Sands - Producer
- Z. Sciacca - Composer
- Sam Sever - Arranger, Composer, Mixing, Original Recording Producer, Producer, Scratching, Sounds
- Amani K. Smith - Engineer, Mixing
- Spook 1 - Vocals
- T-Bone Motta - Drums
- Ras Truly - Engineer, Mixing
- Gebre Waddell - Tracking
- Anthony Ware - Musician
- Daniel Ware - Musician
- Jonathon Ware - Musician
- David Wong - Photography
- Khari Wynn - Guitar
- Z-Trip - Featured Artist, Producer, Scratching
