= Terminator X & The Valley of the Jeep Beets =

1991 studio album by Terminator X

The Valley of the Jeep Beets

Studio album by Terminator X
- Released: May 7, 1991
- Recorded: 1990–1991
- Genre: Hip hop
- Length: 46:40
- Labels: P.R.O. Division; RAL; Columbia
- Producers: Terminator X; Carl Ryder

Terminator X chronology
| The Valley of the Jeep Beets (1991) | Super Bad (1994) |

Terminator X & the Valley of the Jeep Beets is the debut solo album by American DJ Terminator X, released in 1991. Produced by Terminator X and Carl Ryder, the album peaked at number 97 on the Billboard 200 and number 19 on the Top R&B/Hip-Hop Albums chart. Two successful singles were released: "Homey Don't Play Dat," which made it to number one on the Hot Rap Singles, and "Buck Whylin'," which made it to number 7 on the Hot Rap Singles and featured Chuck D and Sister Souljah, as well as a sample from "Rise Above", by Black Flag.

In 1999, Chuck D recollected that his first introduction to the Internet occurred during promotion of the album: "We used it as a different way to handle interviews. Since [Terminator X] was a DJ, he was not a verbal person. The computer let him speak with his hands."

== Critical reception ==
Professional ratings
Review scores
| Source | Rating |
|---|---|
| AllMusic | 3/5 stars |
| Robert Christgau | (neither) |
| The Encyclopedia of Popular Music | 4/5 stars |
| Entertainment Weekly | A− |
| MusicHound Rock: The Essential Album Guide | 3/5 stars |
| The Rolling Stone Album Guide | 4/5 stars |

The Encyclopedia of Popular Music wrote that the album confirmed Terminator X "as one of the finest DJs in the business." Trouser Press wrote that the album mostly "features little-known artists ... with average skills; the Terminator's beats are likewise less than monumental." Spin called the album "the vinyl version of a great block party backed by the world's best DJ."

== Track listing ==
1. "Vendetta ... the Big Getback"—0:34
2. "Buck Whylin'" (featuring Chuck D & Sister Souljah)—4:15
3. "Homey Don't Play Dat"—4:12
4. "Juvenile Delinquintz"—4:43
5. "The Blues"—6:04 (by Andreaus 13 and Dj Mars)
6. "Back to the Scene of the Bass"—4:19
7. "Can't Take My Style"—1:14
8. "Wanna be Dancin'"—3:56
9. "DJ Is the Selector"—2:53
10. "Run That Go-Power Thang"—2:53
11. "No Further"—3:42
12. "High Priest of Turbulence"—1:46
13. "Ain't Got Nuttin'"—3:49

== Charts ==
| Chart (1991) | Peak position |
|---|---|
| U.S. Billboard 200 | 97 |
| U.S. Billboard Top R&B Albums | 19 |

=== Singles ===
"Homey Don't Play Dat"

| Chart | Peak position |
|---|---|
| Hot R&B Singles | 59 |
| Hot Rap Singles | 1 |

"Wanna Be Dancin (Buck-Whylin)"

| Chart | Peak position |
|---|---|
| Hot Rap Singles | 7 |
