= Harder Than You Think =

2007 single by Public Enemy

Single by Public Enemy

from the album How You Sell Soul to a Soulless People Who Sold Their Soul?
- Released: August 13, 2007 (vinyl); August 18, 2012 (digital download)
- Genre: Hip hop
- Length: 4:10 (album version); 3:10 (UK radio edit)
- Label: SLAMjamz Records
- Songwriters: Chuck D; Flavor Flav; Gary G-Wiz
- Producer: Gary G-Wiz

Public Enemy singles chronology
"Amerikan Gangster" (2007)	"Harder Than You Think" (2007)	"Say It Like It Really Is" (2010)

"Harder Than You Think" is the first single from American hip-hop group Public Enemy's 20th-anniversary album How You Sell Soul to a Soulless People Who Sold Their Soul?, released in 2007. It was produced by Gary G-Wiz.

The song gained popularity during late summer 2007, and became Public Enemy's highest-charting single on the UK Singles Chart in August 2012. It borrows from Shirley Bassey's 1972 track "Jezahel", a cover of the song "Jesahel" by the Italian prog rock band Delirium. On November 25, 2023 the authors of "Jesahel" (Ivano Fossati and Oscar Prudente) and Universal Music Group sued Public Enemy for plagiarism, as Fossati and Prudente are not credited for the use of "Jesahel" in "Harder Than You Think".

The song is also known in the UK for its use as Channel 4's theme for their coverage of the Paralympic Games since the 2012 Summer Paralympics, as well as the theme tune for talk and sketch comedy show The Last Leg, which was initially created to cover the Paralympics.

== Music video ==
The music video was directed by David C. Snyder, and was uploaded unofficially onto YouTube on August 3, 2007.

Following the use of "Harder Than You Think" to soundtrack the UK's Channel 4 coverage of the Summer 2012 Paralympics, a music video including clips from the Channel 4 trailer for the Summer 2012 Paralympics was produced by HWIC Filmworks (founded by John Delserone and David C. Snyder, who directed the original video).

A version of the video was also produced for the Dehasse Radio Edit, a dance version of the track remixed for the 2012 re-emergence of the track in the UK charts.

== Use in media ==
The song was featured in Eric Koston's segment in the 2007 skateboarding video "Fully Flared". The song and its beat were used by ESPN for the 2011 Big East men's basketball tournament. The song is also featured on the soundtrack of the video game Skate 2. The song was later featured heavily in a Fall K-Mart ad as of September 2011. It is also one of the lead songs in the commercials for ESPN's broadcasting of the Winter X Games. The song featured prominently towards the end of the BBC Four 2011 documentary "Public Enemy: Prophets Of Rage" which was screened as the fourth episode of the channel's "Black Music Legends Of The 1980s" series. It also appeared in the trailer for the 2012 film Something from Nothing: The Art of Rap and was also the only track to feature on its soundtrack album which did not appear in the actual film. The song is also featured at the opening of the 2012 film End of Watch. In 2021 it's been used in the NBA commercial about Martin Luther King, Jr Day called "We Must Learn". It is also featured in The Redeem Team documentary film released by Netflix in 2022. The song is also featured in the 6th episode of Succession's fourth season as Kendall walks out to make a speech. In 2023, the song is featured again in the biographical film Gran Turismo during the film's final race in the 24 Hours of Le Mans.

=== Paralympics ===
In the United Kingdom, it was used as the soundtrack in both the 90-second trailer and as the theme tune to Channel 4's coverage of the 2012 Summer Paralympics. The song subsequently experienced a surge in sales, peaking at number 4 and thereby becoming Public Enemy's first Top 10 single in the UK and their highest-charting single ever in the nation.

A review for The Independent said of its re-release in the UK:

Following its prominent use in Channel 4's Paralympics coverage, great lost 2007 single 'Harder Than You Think' had a sales surge that carried it into the UK Top Five, giving the band their biggest hit to date. It'd be a thrilling piece of work in any era, Chuck delivering a typically apocalyptic call to arms over a backing track which uses a horn sample from Shirley Bassey's 'Jezahel', but to hear it blasting from the radio in the second decade of this century is beyond beautiful.

The song also serves as the theme tune to the British TV show The Last Leg, which was originally a show that ran alongside the 2012 Paralympics, but later spun off as an independent show.

The song was also used as the theme tune to Channel 4's coverage of the 2014 Winter Paralympics in Sochi, Russia; the 2016 Summer Paralympics in Rio de Janeiro, Brazil; the 2018 Winter Paralympics in Pyeongchang, South Korea and a re-recorded version was used the 2020 Summer Paralympics in Tokyo, Japan, the 2022 Winter Paralympics in Beijing, China, and the 2024 Summer Paralympics in Paris, France.

== Track listing ==
12" vinyl

- Side A
1. "Harder Than You Think" (Clean Mix)
2. "Harder Than You Think" (Instrumental)
- Side B
1. "Amerikan Gangster" (Dirty Mix)
2. "Amerikan Gangster" (Clean Mix)
3. "Amerikan Gangster" (Instrumental)

2012 digital download

1. "Harder Than You Think" (UK Radio Edit) - 3:10

Other versions

1. "Harder Than You Think" (Album Version) - 4:10
2. "Harder Than You Think" (Remix) - 4:38
3. Harder Than You Think (Dehasse Radio Edit) - 3:18
4. Harder Than You Think (Dehasse Club Mix) - 5:59

== Chart performance ==
Chart (2012)	Peak position
Ireland (IRMA)	23
UK Singles (Official Charts)	4
UK Hip Hop/R&B (Official Charts)	1
UK Indie (Official Charts)	1

=== Year-end charts ===
Chart (2012)	Position
UK Singles (OCC)	104

== Certifications ==
Region	Certification	Certified units/sales
United Kingdom (BPI)	Platinum	600,000^{‡}
^{‡} Sales+streaming figures based on certification alone.

== Release history ==
Region	Date	Format	Label
United Kingdom	August 13, 2007	12" vinyl	SLAMJamz
United Kingdom	August 18, 2012	Digital download	SLAMJamz
