= Something from Nothing: The Art of Rap =

- Theatrical release poster
- Directed by: Ice-T; Andy Baybutt (co.)
- Produced by: Paul Toogood; Ice-T (exec.)
- Cinematography: Jeremy Hewson; Andy Baybutt; John Halliday; Patrick Donnelly (add.)
- Edited by: Kieran Smyth
- Production companies: JollyGood Films; Westmount Films; Final Level Entertainment
- Distributed by: Indomina Releasing (USA, theatrical); Kaleidoscope Film Distribution (UK, theatrical); Indomina Films (USA, all media)
- Release dates: June 15, 2012 (America); July 20, 2012 (Europe)
- Country: United States
- Language: English

Something from Nothing: The Art of Rap is a 2012 American documentary film directed and executive produced by Ice-T and co-directed by Andy Baybutt. It focuses on the craft of writing and performing rap verses, and all the interviewees are musicians of the genre and friends of Ice-T. Producer Paul Toogood states on the DVD release that the genesis of the project stemmed from a conversation he had with Ice-T in which he asked him how he wrote "seminal tracks" such as "6 in the Mornin'" and "Colors".

Ice-T replied that in his thirty-year hip-hop career, no one had ever asked him that. Grandmaster Caz features more than any other interviewee, and the movie returns to his home on multiple occasions throughout showing his creative process as he writes "The Art Of Rap" rap, which he then delivers. It was shot on location, but mainly in New York, Los Angeles and Detroit. The film was an official selection for the Sundance Film Festival where it was screened as a premiere on January 2, 2012. The film was released in the theaters on June 15, 2012 and in the UK it was released on July 20, 2012.

== Cast ==
In alphabetical order, as named in the film:

- Afrika Bambaataa
- Big Daddy Kane
- B-Real
- Bun B
- Cashout Chris
- Chino XL
- Chuck D
- Common
- Dana Dane
- Denis "Deft" Matinez
- DJ Premier
- DMC
- Doug E. Fresh
- Dr. Dre
- Eminem
- Freddie Demarco
- Grandmaster Caz
- Ice Cube
- Ice-T
- Immortal Technique
- Joe Budden
- Kanye West
- Kool Boy
- Kool Keith
- Kool Moe Dee
- KRS-One
- Loke
- Lord Finesse
- Lord Jamar
- Marley Marl
- MC Lyte
- Melle Mel
- Nas
- Puerto Rico
- Q-Tip
- Raekwon
- Rakim
- Ras Kass
- Redman
- Royce da 5'9"
- Run
- Salt
- Snoop Dogg
- Tha Furious One
- Treach
- WC
- Xzibit
- Yasiin (formerly known as Mos Def)

== Soundtrack album ==
An official soundtrack to the film was released on CD and as a digital download featuring fifteen songs selected from the movie, seven freestyles as performed in the film, plus one track "Harder Than You Think (Just Like That)" by Public Enemy, which featured in the film's trailer but does not feature in the actual movie. The first track is an official live acapella freestyle by Ice-T, but in the film's credits, this track is referred to as "Chrome Plated 357". Ice-T is also featured on Immortal Technique's live acapella freestyle but is not credited as such on the soundtrack.

No.	Title	Artist	Length
1.	"Freestyle (Live Acapella)"	Ice-T	0:34
2.	"Straight Outta Compton"	N.W.A	4:15
3.	"Sucker M.C.'s (Krush-Groove 1)"	Run-DMC	3:07
4.	"Follow the Leader"	Eric B. & Rakim	5:32
5.	"Freestyle (Live Acapella)"	KRS-One	0:50
6.	"Raw"	Big Daddy Kane	4:06
7.	"The World Is Yours"	Nas	4:46
8.	"Full Clip"	Gang Starr	3:36
9.	"New Jack Hustler (Live Acapella)"	Immortal Technique	0:24
10.	"As High As Wu-Tang Get"	Wu-Tang Clan	2:37
11.	"Real Hip-Hop"	Das EFX	4:07
12.	"Freestyle (Live Acapella)"	Melle Mel	0:30
13.	"P.S.K. (What Does It Mean?)"	Schoolly D	6:27
14.	"Ego Trippin'"	Ultramagnetic MC's	5:24
15.	"Bentleys & Bitches (Live Acapella)"	Ras Kass	0:51
16.	"King of the Beats"	Mantronix	5:07
17.	"It Takes Two"	Rob Base & DJ EZ Rock	4:58
18.	"Don't Stop... Planet Rock (LP Version)"	Africa Bambaataa & the Soul Sonic Force	5:18
19.	"The Kid Magic (Live Acapella)"	Lord Jamar	0:22
20.	"Vivrant Thing (Club Mix)"	Q-Tip	3:10
21.	"Cold Rock A Party"	MC Lyte	4:15
22.	"Harder Than You Think... Just Like That"	Public Enemy	3:25
23.	"The Art of Rap (Live Acapella)"	Grandmaster Caz	0:49
Total length:			70:30
