= Tap the Bottle =

Single by Young Black Teenagers

from the album Dead Enz Kidz Doin' Lifetime Bidz
- Released: November 24, 1992
- Recorded: 1992
- Genre: Hip hop
- Length: 4:00
- Label: SOUL; MCA
- Songwriters: Ronald Knute Winge; Adam Michael Weiner; Shorty; Flex; Norman Rogers
- Producer: Terminator X

Young Black Teenagers singles chronology
"Loud & Hard to Hit" (1991)	"Tap the Bottle" (1992)	"Roll with the Flavor" (1993)

Music video
- "Tap the Bottle" on YouTube

"Tap the Bottle" is a song by American hip hop group Young Black Teenagers. It was released on November 24, 1992, via Sound of Urban Listeners (SOUL)/MCA Records as the lead single from YBT's second studio album Dead Enz Kidz Doin' Lifetime Bidz. Production was handled by Terminator X.

The single peaked at number 5 on the Official New Zealand Top 40 Singles chart, number 39 on the UK Singles Chart and number 55 on the Billboard Hot 100. It was certified platinum by Recorded Music NZ in 1993 for selling 10,000 units in New Zealand. The song remains Young Black Teenagers' most successful recording to date.

== Track listing ==
1. "Tap the Bottle" (Album version) - 4:00
2. "Tap the Bottle" (Instrumental) - 4:01

== Personnel ==
- Ron "Kamron" Winge – main artist, songwriter
- Adam "Firstborn" Wayne – main artist, songwriter
- Scott "DJ Skribble" Ialacci – main artist, scratches
- Norman "Terminator X" Rogers – songwriter, producer
- Flex – songwriter
- Shorty – songwriter
- Vladimir "Vlado" Meller – mastering

== Charts ==
=== Weekly charts ===
Chart (1993)	Peak position
Australia (ARIA)	136
New Zealand (Recorded Music NZ)	5
UK Singles (OCC)	39
US Billboard Hot 100	55
US Hot R&B/Hip-Hop Songs	73
US Hot Rap Songs	6
US Dance/Electronic Singles Sales	6
US Dance Club Songs	27

=== Year-end charts ===
Chart (1993)	Position
New Zealand (Recorded Music NZ)	18

== Certifications ==
Region	Certification	Certified units/sales
New Zealand (RMNZ)	Platinum	10,000^{*}
^{*} Sales figures based on certification alone.
