= List of stage names: X =

This list of stage names lists names used by those in the entertainment industry, alphabetically by their stage name's surname (or the best approximation) followed by the given name (or the best approximation) where the surname begins with "X". One-word stage names are presented in List of one-word stage names.

Stage name	Birth name	Life	Notability	Notes
Lil Nas X	Montero Lamar Hill	1999–	American rapper	
Terminator X	Norman Rogers	1966–	American DJ	
Lil Xan	Nicholas Diego Leanos	1996–	American rapper	Also known as Diego
Charli XCX	Charlotte Emma Aitchison	1992–	English singer and songwriter	
Jamie xx	James Thomas Smith	1988–	English musician, DJ and record producer	
