= Muse Sick-n-Hour Mess Age =

Studio album by Public Enemy
- Released: August 23, 1994
- Recorded: 1993–94
- Genres: Hardcore hip-hop; alternative hip-hop; political hip-hop
- Length: 74:28
- Labels: Def Jam; PolyGram
- Producers: The Bomb Squad; Gary G-Wiz; Keith Shocklee; Flavor Flav; Easy Mo Bee; Kerwin "Sleek" Young; Larry "Panic" Walford

Public Enemy chronology
| Apocalypse 91… The Enemy Strikes Black (1991) | Muse Sick-n-Hour Mess Age (1994) | He Got Game (1998) |

Singles from Muse Sick-n-Hour Mess Age
- 1. "Give It Up" Released: July 1994; 2. "What Kind Of Power We Got?" Released: 1994; 3. "I Stand Accused" Released: December 1994; 4. "So Whatcha Gone Do Now" Released: July 1995

Muse Sick-n-Hour Mess Age is the fifth studio album by American hip hop group Public Enemy, released on August 23, 1994, by Def Jam Recordings. The title is a reverse mondegreen of the phrase "music in our message" (emphasizing that their message is more important than the music, rather than the typical "message in our music"). Alternatively, it could be interpreted as "music and our message." The album debuted at number 14 on the US Billboard 200 chart, selling 56,000 copies in its first week.

The album's first single, "Give It Up", peaked at number 33 on the US Billboard Hot 100 in August 1994, and was the group's only American top 40 hit in their career.

Upon its release, Muse Sick-n-Hour Mess Age received generally mixed-to-positive reviews from most music critics, amid controversy among critics and fans over Public Enemy's relevance in hip hop at the time.

Mark Texeira illustrated the cover and inside sleeve.

== Critical reception ==
Professional ratings
Review scores
| Source | Rating |
|---|---|
| AllMusic | 3/5 stars |
| Chicago Tribune | 3.5/4 stars |
| Entertainment Weekly | B |
| Los Angeles Times | 2/4 stars |
| Q | 4/5 stars |
| Rolling Stone | 2/5 stars |
| The Rolling Stone Album Guide | 3/5 stars |
| The Source | 2.5/5 stars |
| Tom Hull – on the Web | A− |
| The Village Voice | A− |

According to music journalist Neil Strauss, music critics initially accused Public Enemy of "being out of touch, of launching a weak attack against the trend toward gangster rap, of writing second-rate rhymes, of producing the album poorly, of using a bad pun for the title ('music in our message') and of being too old".

Spin (8/94, p. 84) - Highly Recommended - "Knee deep in the age of gangsta, at the anticlimactic millennial edge of a world already gone wrong, Public Enemy has dropped its latest."

Entertainment Weekly (8/26 - 9/2, p. 112) - "... it takes true guts to dis gangsta rap and to challenge the black community to confront its problems ..." - Rating: B

Q magazine (9/94, p. 106) - 4 Stars - Excellent - "Fact is, the lay off has just made Public Enemy sound fresh again ... because they've regained the wicked combination of sonic disturbance and loose, rabblerousing funk that drove classic jams like 911 is A Joke."

Alternative Press (9/94, pp. 80–81) - "Yeah, we've heard it before but Chuck can make waves even when he's treading water ... MESSAGE may be PE's most consistently enjoyable disc."

Vibe (8/94, p. 105) - "... a tour de force of densely constructed music and verbiage. Snippets of Stax-Volt grooves, reggae, soul, and metal bop and weave over gut-punching bass lines and wicked drumming while front man Chuck D lets fly with ... pronouncements, warnings, and accusations ..."

Melody Maker (8/20/94, p. 35) - Recommended - "This LP isn't just a stunning return to form for Public Enemy, it's perhaps the most powerful horrified answer to what you are doing to black culture yet."

NME (12/24/94, p. 22) - Ranked #20 in NME's list of the 'Top 50 Albums Of 1994.'

== Commercial performance ==
Due to a change of the album's release date, negative reviews from publications such as Rolling Stone and The Source were published a month prior to the album's first sales week. In spite of this, the album performed well. Muse Sick-n-Hour Mess Age debuted at number 14 on the US Billboard 200 chart, selling 56,000 copies its first week. This was more than most of Public Enemy's previous albums. The album quickly fell off the charts, as sales were negatively impacted by Def Jam's move from Sony Music to PolyGram prior to its release. On October 25, 1994, the album was certified gold by the Recording Industry Association of America (RIAA) for sales of over 500,000 copies in the United States.

== Track listing ==
All songs were written or co-written by members of Public Enemy, except "Godd Complexx", which was written by Jalal Mansur Nuriddin a.k.a. Alafia Pudim.

1. "Whole Lotta Love Goin on in the Middle of Hell" – 3:13
2. "Theatrical Parts" - 0:28
3. "Give It Up" – 4:31
4. "What Side You On?" – 4:07
5. "Bedlam 13:13" – 4:07
6. "Stop in the Name ..." - 1:21
7. "What Kind of Power We Got?" – 5:31
8. "So Whatcha Gone Do Now?" – 4:41
9. "White Heaven / Black Hell" - 1:06
10. "Race Against Time" – 3:21
11. "They Used to Call It Dope" - 0:30
12. "Aintnuttin Buttersong" – 4:23
13. "Live and Undrugged, Pt. 1 & 2" – 5:55
14. "Thin Line Between Law & Rape" – 4:45
15. "I Ain't Mad at All" – 3:25
16. "Death of a Carjacka" - 2:00
17. "I Stand Accused" – 3:57
18. "Godd Complexx" – 3:40
19. "Hitler Day" – 4:28
20. "Harry Allen's Interactive Super Highway Phone Call to Chuck D" - 2:55
21. "Living in a Zoo Remix" – 3:38

An extra track titled "Ferocious Soul" is included on the CD as a pregap hidden track.

== Personnel ==
Credits adapted from CD Universe.

- Flavor Flav – bass, keyboards, producer, rap vocals
- Chuck D. – liner notes, producer, rap vocals
- Terminator X – scratches
- Tom Costello – various instruments
- Paul Reisch – various instruments
- Gerry Comito – guitar
- Darryl Dixon – horns
- David Watson – horns
- Bill Mobley – horns
- Kerwin "Sleek" Young – bass, Producer
- Nathaniel Townsley III – drums
- John B. Smooth – congas
- Hank Shocklee – producer
- Keith Shocklee – programming, background vocals, producer
- Gary G-Wiz – producer
- Kamron – scratches
- Kevin Boone – scratches
- Tet – background vocals
- Norma Jean Wright – background vocals
- Paulette McWilliams – background vocals
- Bemshi – background vocals

- Carl DeHaney – background vocals
- The Punk Barbarians – background vocals
- Grandell Thompson – background vocals
- Jamel Bazemore – background vocals
- Sean Chaplin – background vocals
- Victor Brownlee – background vocals
- Harry Allen – background vocals
- Errol Nazareth – background vocals
- Jesse Smith – background vocals
- Andre Guilty – background vocals
- Mike Williams – background vocals
- Akilah Watkins – background vocals
- Raymond Mattry – background vocals
- Sheila Cabllero – background vocals
- Jeanette Harrod – background vocals
- Prince Yellordy – background vocals
- Jean Victor – background vocals
- Nick Sansano – engineer
- Gerry Comito – engineer
- Jimmy O'Neil – engineer

== Charts ==
=== Weekly charts ===
| Chart (1994) | Peak position |
|---|---|
| Australian Albums (ARIA) | 16 |
| Austrian Albums (Ö3 Austria) | 27 |
| Canadian Albums (Billboard) | 20 |
| Dutch Albums (Album Top 100) | 39 |
| German Albums (Offizielle Top 100) | 25 |
| New Zealand Albums (RMNZ) | 7 |
| Swedish Albums (Sverigetopplistan) | 20 |
| Swiss Albums (Schweizer Hitparade) | 22 |
| UK Albums (Official Charts) | 12 |
| US Billboard 200 | 14 |
| US Top R&B/Hip-Hop Albums (Billboard) | 4 |

== Certifications ==
| Region | Certification | Certified units/sales |
|---|---|---|
| United States (RIAA) | Gold | 500,000^{^} |
^{^} Shipments figures based on certification alone.
