= Super Bad (Terminator X album) =

Studio album by Terminator X & The Godfathers Of Threatt
- Released: June 21, 1994
- Recorded: 1993–1994
- Genre: Political Rap; Hardcore rap
- Length: 58:41
- Label: P.R.O. Division/RAL/PolyGram Records
- Producer: Russell Simmons (exec.); Terminator X Kool DJ Herc; Grandmaster Flash

Terminator X & The Godfathers Of Threatt chronology
Terminator X & The Valley of the Jeep Beets (1991)	Super Bad (1994)

Professional ratings
Review scores
Source	Rating
AllMusic	2/5 stars
The Encyclopedia of Popular Music	3/5 stars
MusicHound Rock: The Essential Album Guide	2/5 stars
Rolling Stone	4/5 stars

Super Bad is the second solo album by DJ Terminator X. The album was released on June 21, 1994, on Def Jam Recordings sub-label RAL and was produced by Terminator X, Kool DJ Herc, Grandmaster Flash, and Russell Simmons. The album was only a minor success, making it to #189 on the Billboard 200 and #38 on the Top R&B/Hip-Hop Albums. Two singles were released, "Under the Sun" and "It All Comes Down to the Money," the latter of which made it to #26 on the Hot Rap Singles. "It All Comes Down to the Money" was released in 1993.

== Production ==
Super Bad features guest appearances from many hip hop musicians, including Ice Cube, Chuck D, Ice-T, Whodini, Grandmaster Flash, Kool DJ Herc, Cold Crush Brothers, The Fantastic Five, and Jam Master Jay.

== Critical reception ==
Vibe wrote that "although much of Super Bad is fueled by spare beats--slinky keyboards here, the signature PE siren loops there, scratching and drum machine effects everywhere--Terminator X makes good on his tip-off proclamation 'I speak with my hands.'" Billboard praised "Under the Sun," calling it "an intelligent vibe, fueled by some of the spaciest grooves since Parliament." Trouser Press wrote: "Tripping from Jamaica to the Bronx and back, the diverse album is kinetic, jazzy, soulful, cinematic and absurdly entertaining."

== Track listing ==
1. "Terminator's Back" feat. Kool DJ Herc – 1:47
2. "Kidds From the Terror" feat. Punk Barbarians – 2:55
3. "Godfather Promo" – 0:09
4. "Sticka" feat. Chuck D, Ice Cube, Ice-T, MC Lyte & Punk Barbarians – 3:58
5. "Money Promo" – 0:26
6. "It All Comes Down to the Money" feat. Whodini – 5:28
7. "Thumpin's Goin On Rogers" feat. Kool DJ Herc – 1:25
8. "Krunch Time" – feat. Melquan - 3:06
9. "G'Damn Datt DJ Made My Day" feat. Grandmaster Flash – 2:14
10. "Stylewild '94" feat. Cold Crush Brothers & The Fantastic Five – 5:59
11. "Funky Piano" – 0:54
12. "A Side Final Promo" – 0:24
13. "Make Room for Thunder" feat. Kool DJ Herc – 2:29
14. "Scary-Us" feat. Flatlinerz – 3:41
15. "Learn That Poem" – 0:41
16. "Under the Sun" feat. Joe Sinistr – 3:45
17. "1994 Street Muthafukkas Gong Show" 3:52
18. "Don't Even Go There" feat. Bonnie 'N' Clyde – 3:53
19. "Herc Yardman Word" – 0:54
20. "Mashitup" feat. Prince Collin – 3:42
21. "Say My Brother" – 0:07
22. "Put Cha Thang Down" – 5:16
23. "Herc's Message" feat. Kool DJ Herc – 1:25

== Charts ==
Chart (1994)	Peak position
U.S. Billboard 200	189
U.S. Billboard Top R&B Albums	38

=== Singles ===
It All Comes Down to the Money

Chart	Peak position
Hot Dance Music/Maxi-Singles Sales	12
Hot R&B Singles	72
Hot Rap Singles	26

Under the Sun

Chart	Peak position
Hot Dance Music/Maxi-Singles Sales	44
