= NBA Ballers: Chosen One =

2008 video game

- Cover featuring Dwight Howard
- Publisher: Midway Games
- Series: NBA Ballers
- Engine: Renderware
- Platforms: PlayStation 3, Xbox 360
- Release: PlayStation 3: NA: April 21, 2008; Xbox 360: NA: April 21, 2008; AU: April 24, 2008; EU: April 25, 2008
- Genre: Sports (basketball)
- Modes: Single-player, multiplayer

NBA Ballers: Chosen One is a video game for the PlayStation 3 and Xbox 360. It is the sequel to NBA Ballers: Phenom.

NBA Ballers: Chosen One allows players to live the life of an NBA superstar. The game features competitive combo and super-move systems.

== Gameplay ==
When playing, your performance determines the evolution of your career as a basketball player and as a superstar. The game features new moves to the series, such as "Shut 'Em Down" super moves and Act-A-Fool combos. The game can be played single-player, multi-player and online play, with options to play 1-v-1, 2-v-2 or 1-v-1-v-1 matches. As well as online play, downloadable content is available and features over 500 new items including players. Hip-hop legend Chuck D calls the play-by-play action while hip-hop producer Just Blaze created over 30 custom tracks for the game. The gameplay itself, however, has taken a more realistic approach this time, as the 'Baller On Fire' and 'Bring Down the House' abilities from the first two games do not return in Chosen One.

== Reception ==
Reception

Aggregate score
Aggregator	Score	
Aggregator	PS3	Xbox 360
Metacritic	54/100	55/100

Review scores
Publication	Score	
Publication	PS3	Xbox 360
Destructoid	3.5/10	N/A
Eurogamer	N/A	5/10
Game Informer	6.75/10	6.75/10
GamePro	N/A	3/5
GameRevolution	N/A	D−
GameSpot	5.5/10	5.5/10
GameSpy	3/5	3/5
GameTrailers	5.7/10	N/A
GameZone	5.4/10	6/10
Giant Bomb	2/5	2/5
IGN	6/10	6/10
Official Xbox Magazine (US)	N/A	7/10
PlayStation: The Official Magazine	2.5/5	N/A
411Mania	N/A	7.8/10
Maxim	5/10	5/10

The game received "mixed" reviews on both platforms according to the review aggregation website Metacritic.
