= How You Sell Soul to a Soulless People Who Sold Their Soul? =

How You Sell Soul to a Soulless People Who Sold Their Soul???

Studio album by Public Enemy
- Released: August 7, 2007
- Recorded: 2003–2007; The Mountain (Anaheim, California)
- Genre: Political hip-hop; hardcore hip-hop
- Label: SlamJamz; Redeye
- Producer: Gary G-Wiz; Amani K. Smith; Flavor Flav

Public Enemy chronology
Rebirth of a Nation (2006)	How You Sell Soul to a Soulless People Who Sold Their Soul??? (2007)	Most of My Heroes Still Don't Appear on No Stamp (2012)

Singles from How You Sell Soul to a Soulless People Who Sold Their Soul???
- 1. "Black Is Back" Released: 2007; 2. "Amerikan Gangster" Released: 2007; 3. "Harder Than You Think" Released: 2007

Professional ratings
Aggregate scores
Source	Rating
Metacritic	71/100
Review scores
Source	Rating
AllMusic	4/5 stars
Blender	3.5/5 stars
HipHopDX	4/5 stars
MSN Music (Consumer Guide)	A−
NME	6/10
Pitchfork	7.1/10
Q	3/5 stars
Record Collector	4/5 stars
Rolling Stone	3.5/5 stars
USA Today	3.5/4 stars

How You Sell Soul to a Soulless People Who Sold Their Soul??? is the tenth studio album by American hip hop group Public Enemy, released August 7, 2007, on Slam Jamz Recordings in the United States. Its release coincided with the 20th anniversary of their career. The album debuted at number 49 on Independent Albums chart, and it received generally positive reviews from most music critics, based on an aggregate score of 71/100 from Metacritic. Music critic Robert Christgau named How You Sell Soul to a Soulless People Who Sold Their Soul??? his second favorite album that didn't make Rolling Stone's Top 50 albums of 2007. In September 2012, the album finally entered the UK chart at number 199, followed by success of the top 5 single "Harder Than You Think" after it became the theme song to the British comedy talk show The Last Leg, which debuted the previous month as The Last Leg with Adam Hills.

The album contains the song Harder Than You Think, which is based on a sample of the song Jesahel presented by Delirium at the Festival di Sanremo in 1972, without citing the original authors of the song, Ivano Fossati and Oscar Prudente: for this reason in November 2023 a legal action was started against Public Enemy by the authors and Universal Records.

== Reception ==
- Alternative Press (p. 176) - 3.5 stars out of 5 -- "Public Enemy remain fiercely independent and definitely seem revitalized."
- The Wire (p. 75) - "[T]his is PE's tenth studio album in their 20th year and their blunt anti-artiste, anti-materialist stance carries serious weight."

== Track listing ==
1. "How You Sell Soul to a Soulless People Who Sold Their Soul???" – 2:36
2. "Black Is Back" – 2:42
3. "Harder Than You Think" – 4:09
4. "Between Hard and a Rock Place" – 0:59
5. "Sex, Drugs & Violence" (feat. KRS-One) – 3:35
6. "Amerikan Gangster" (feat. E.Infinite) – 4:03
7. "Can You Hear Me Now" – 3:58
8. "Head Wide Shut" – 1:31
9. "Flavor Man" – 3:44
10. "The Enemy Battle Hymn of the Public" – 3:24
11. "Escapism" – 4:53
12. "Frankenstar" – 3:23
13. "Col-Leepin" – 3:58
14. "Radiation of a RADIOTVMOVIE Nation" – 1:10
15. "See Something, Say Something" – 3:46
16. "Long and Whining Road" – 4:24
17. "Bridge of Pain" – 3:07
18. "Eve of Destruction" – 4:15
19. "How You Sell Soul (Time Is God Refrain)" – 2:31

== Personnel ==
Credits adapted from Allmusic.

- James Bomb (S1W) – group member
- Chuck D – executive producer, group member, vocals
- Flavor Flav – group member, vocals
- Bernie Larsen – guitar
- Khari Wynn – guitar
- Michael Faulkner – drums
- Pop Diesel (S1W) – group member
- La Aerial Owens – vocals (background)
- E. Infinite – choir, chorus
- Gene Barge – saxophone
- Gebre Waddell – engineer
- Vincent Arbelet – photography
- Le Bijoutier – photography
- Mathieu Cavaliere – photography
- Derek Welte – photography
- Gary G-Wiz – Producer
- Mike "mGee" Gregoire – package design
- Earle Holder – mastering
- Walter Leapheart – liner notes
- Amani K. Smith – associate producer, mixing, producer
- Paul Stone – cover illustration
- Andrew Williams – sound technician
- Ron Wynn – liner notes

== Chart performance ==
Chart (2012)	Peak position
UK Albums (OCC)	131
UK Album Downloads (OCC)	76
UK Independent Albums (OCC)	16
UK R&B Albums (OCC)	19
