= Son of Bazerk =

American hip hop group

- Origin: Long Island, New York, United States
- Genres: East Coast hip hop Hardcore hip hop Alternative hip hop Experimental hip hop Political hip hop
- Years active: 1983–1995, 2009–present
- Labels: Soul Entertainment; Slam Jamz
- Members: Son of Bazerk; Daddy Rawe; Half Pint
- Past members: The Band (DJ); Sandman; Almighty Jahwell (deceased)

Son of Bazerk is an American hip hop group, consisting of Son of Bazerk (real name Tony Allen), Almighty Jahwell (Jeffrey Height), Daddy Rawe (Gary Pep Stanton), and Half Pint (Cassandra Jackson). It was formed by Hank Shocklee, a member of the producer team the Bomb Squad.

== History ==
The band formed in the mid-1980s, originally as Townhouse 3. After coming to the attention of hip hop producer Hank Shocklee, member of the Bomb Squad, which produced early Public Enemy albums, they chose the name Son of Bazerk.

The group released a debut album in 1991 called Bazerk Bazerk Bazerk, credited to Son of Bazerk featuring No Self Control and the Band, which was produced by the Bomb Squad. The album received some positive reviews yet it did not sell well.

Almost 20 years later, the group reunited and released an album produced by DJ Johnny Juice, who produced the latest Public Enemy albums, on Chuck D's label Slam Jamz. That comeback was praised by some media, such as The Village Voice and Time Out.

Half Pint has become a teacher and administrator at Roosevelt High School, Roosevelt, Long Island.

== Discography ==
- Bazerk Bazerk Bazerk (MCA Records, May 14, 1991)
- Well Thawed Out (Slam Jamz, September 30, 2010)

== Musical influences ==
The band's sound is inspired by James Brown, and the cover of their debut Bazerk, Bazerk, Bazerk was a direct homage to James Brown's debut LP Please, Please, Please.

== Other information ==
- According to the members, the idea of the band's reunification was born after reading the online reaction to a Son of Bazerk and DJ Johnny Juice interview on the website Unkut.com, with many people asking them to release a new album.
- Flavor Flav, member of Public Enemy, was introduced to Chuck D by Son of Bazerk (Tony Allen) in the early 1980s, when he was doing a radio show on WBAU at Adelphi University.
