= Young Black Teenagers (album) =

Studio album by Young Black Teenagers
- Released: 1991
- Recorded: 1990
- Genre: Rap
- Length: 45:40
- Label: S.O.U.L.
- Producer: The Bomb Squad

Young Black Teenagers chronology
Young Black Teenagers (1991)	Dead Enz Kidz Doin' Lifetime Bidz (1993)

Singles from Young Black Teenagers
- 1. "Loud and Hard to Hit" Released: 1991

Young Black Teenagers is the debut album by the American rap group Young Black Teenagers, released in 1991. "Loud & Hard to Hit" peaked at No. 25 on the Hot Rap Singles chart. The album cover art is modeled after the Beatles' With the Beatles. After a negative radio response to the track "Proud to Be Black", MCA Records chose not to use its logo on the packaging. The group supported the album by touring with Public Enemy.

== Production ==
The album was produced by Hank Shocklee and the Bomb Squad and released through Shocklee's S.O.U.L Records label; YBT's Kamron grew up in the same neighborhood as some of the production group's members. "To My Donna" is an answer song directed to Madonna's "Justify My Love", which used a backing rhythm track taken by Lenny Kravitz from a Public Enemy instrumental produced by the Bomb Squad. "Daddy Kalled Me Niga Cause I Likeded to Rhyme" is about dealing with racist parents. "Nobody Knows Kelli" is an ode to Married... with Children's Kelly Bundy.

== Critical reception ==
Professional ratings
Review scores
Source	Rating
AllMusic	4/5 stars
Calgary Herald	B
Robert Christgau	(dud)
Q	3/5 stars
St. Petersburg Times	4/5 stars

Q said that "YBT have a enough power, but their songs edge towards monotony." Entertainment Weekly wrote that YBT "rise to the challenge presented by the high-quality production, and rhyme with conviction". Newsday labeled the album "mall rap". The Calgary Herald opined that "the tunes are tighter and tougher than most rap fare". The St. Petersburg Times concluded that YBT "get past racial barriers, smack dab into a clever, creative form of rap that knows neither limits nor boundaries of color."

== Track listing ==
1. "Punks, Lies & Video Tape" – 4:11
2. "Korner Groove" – 3:57
3. "Traci" – 2:37
4. "First Stage of a Rampage Called the Rap Rage" – 3:51
5. "Nobody Knows Kelli" – 3:27
6. "Daddy Kalled Me Niga Cause I Likeded to Rhyme" – 2:59
7. "Chillin' wit Me Posse" – 2:05
8. "Mack Daddy Don of the Underworld" – 3:48
9. "Loud and Hard to Hit" – 3:35
10. "My TV Went Black and White on Me" – 3:32
11. "Proud to Be Black" – 4:42
12. "To My Donna" – 3:22
13. "My Color TV" – 3:34

== Samples ==
- "Proud to Be Black"
  - "The Boss" by James Brown

== Personnel ==
- Adam "Firstborn" Weiner – rapping, main artist, songwriter
- Ron "Kamron" Winge – rapping, main artist, songwriter
- ATA – rapping, main artist, songwriter
- Tommy Never – rapping, main artist, songwriter
- Scott "DJ Skribble" Ialacci – main artist, turntables, sampler
