= Young Black Teenagers =

American hip hop group

- top: First Born, DJ Skribble and Tommy Never bottom: Kamron and ATA

Background information
- Also known as: YBT
- Origin: Long Island, New York, U.S.
- Genres: Hip hop
- Years active: 1989–1994
- Labels: Sound of Urban Listeners; MCA
- Past members: ATA; Firstborn; Tommy Never; Kamron; DJ Skribble

Young Black Teenagers (YBT) was an American hip hop group from Long Island, New York that formed in 1989 and released two albums. Despite its name, none of the group's five members were teenagers and all of them were caucasian.

Its members were ATA, First Born, Tommy Never, Kamron, and DJ Skribble. YBT had the support of the prominent rap group Public Enemy, whose producer Hank Shocklee signed them as the first act of his label Sound of Urban Listeners (SOUL). They released their second album with MCA Records.

== History ==
=== Formation ===
The group formed in 1989, and eventually decided on the name Young Black Teenagers because the five members, who were all white, had grown up in black neighborhoods and as a result felt adapted to black culture, to which their families did not understand. "We're not trying to call ourselves black, because obviously we're white" said Kamron, who occupied the same social circles as Public Enemy and convinced Hank Shocklee, Public Enemy's producer, to sign Young Black Teenagers to his new label Sound of Urban Listeners (SOUL). In an interview with The New York Times, Firstborn called hip hop "a state of mind" and Kamron said, "we are at least two years ahead of our time".

At the same time, the members of the Leaders of the New School were offered the option of performing as one of two group names chosen by The Bomb Squad: Leaders of the New School or Young Black Teenagers. When they were informed by The Bomb Squad that they were mentoring another crew who were interested in taking the L.O.N.S. name, both groups were told that they would have to battle for it. Both sides had to make a song called "Fuck The Old School," and who created the better song would win the L.O.N.S. designator. The loser would have to settle for Young Black Teenagers as their group name. After Rhymes and Brown's group earned the name Leaders of the New School, the white group was named Young Black Teenagers.

=== Music ===
Their debut album Young Black Teenagers (1991) featured the singles "Nobody Knows Kelli" (about the character Kelly Bundy from the sitcom Married... with Children), "Proud to Be Black", and "To My Donna" (an attack on Madonna for taking the rhythm track of the Public Enemy song "Security of the First World" for her single "Justify My Love"). The group appeared on The Joan Rivers Show in January 1991. After the first album, Tommy Never left the group, and YBT became a foursome, with A.T.A. contributing more vocally. Their second album, Dead Enz Kidz Doin' Lifetime Bidz (1993), featured the song "Tap the Bottle", their biggest single. The group broke up in 1994.

=== Reception ===
Some audiences did not respond well to the Young Black Teenagers being white. A crowd in London met them with jeers and an audience at the Apollo Theater did not applaud (Firstborn told The New York Times, "When you are playing the Apollo and you are five white guys, and no one throws a chair at you, that's considered a success"). Young Black Teenagers were listed among VH1's "Least Hiphop Moments" for their name and premise.

== Members ==
- Adam "Firstborn" Weiner – rap vocals, main artist, songwriter
- Ron "Kamron" Winge – rap vocals, main artist, songwriter
- Rodney "ATA" Rivera – rap vocals, main artist, songwriter
- Tommy Never – rap vocals, main artist, songwriter
- Scott "DJ Skribble" Ialacci – main artist, turntables, sampler

== Discography ==
=== Studio albums ===
List of studio albums, with selected chart positions
Title	Album details	Peak chart positions	
Title	Album details	US	US R&B /HH
Young Black Teenagers	Released: February 19, 1991; Label: S.O.U.L; Formats: CD, LP, Cassette, digital download	—	—
Dead Enz Kidz Doin' Lifetime Bidz	Released: February 2, 1993; Label: S.O.U.L/MCA; Formats: CD, LP, Cassette, digital download	158	56
"—" denotes a recording that did not chart or was not released in that territory.

=== Singles ===
==== As lead artist ====
List of singles, with selected chart positions and certifications, showing year released and album name
Title	Year	Peak chart positions						Certifications	Album
Title	Year	US	US Dance	US R&B	US Rap	NZ	UK	Certifications	Album
"Nobody Knows Kelli/Proud to Be Black"	1990	—	—	—	—	—	—		Young Black Teenagers
"To My Donna"	1991	—	—	—	—	—	—		Young Black Teenagers
"Loud & Hard to Hit"	1991	—	—	—	24	—	—		Young Black Teenagers
"Tap the Bottle"	1992	55	27	73	6	5	39	RIANZ: Platinum	Dead Enz Kidz Doin' Lifetime Bidz
"Roll W/ the Flavor"	1993	—	—	—	22	25	—		Dead Enz Kidz Doin' Lifetime Bidz
"First True Love Affair"	1993	—	—	—	—	—	—		Dead Enz Kidz Doin' Lifetime Bidz
"—" denotes a recording that did not chart or was not released in that territory.

==== Promotional singles ====
List of singles, showing year released and album name
Title	Year	Album
"Hail to the Chief"	2000	Non-album single
