= ToneThis =

ToneThis is a mobile media desktop application that allows people to personalize and deliver their personal music, images and videos wirelessly or via Bluetooth or USB to their mobile phone as a ringtone, wallpaper or mobile video. ToneThis is a CNET Top 10 Mobile application and is available in retail stores including CompUSA and Best Buy.

ToneThis was founded by Raj Singh, a serial mobile entrepreneur.
