= Inside of You (album) =

Studio album by Aaron Hall
- Released: October 20, 1998
- Genre: R&B; soul; new jack swing
- Length: 66:45
- Label: MCA
- Producer: Joe "Flip" Wilson, Faith Evans; Malik Pendleton, Manuel Seal; Reese Johnson

Aaron Hall chronology
The Truth (1993)	Inside of You (1998)	Adults Only: The Final (2005)

Singles from Inside of You
- 1. "All the Places (I Will Kiss You)" Released: September 15, 1998

Professional ratings
Review scores
Source	Rating
Allmusic	2.5/5 stars

Inside of You is the second studio album by American R&B artist Aaron Hall, it was released on October 20, 1998, on MCA Records. The album's first single "All the Places (I Will Kiss You)" became a top 10 hit on Billboard's Top Hip Hop/R&B Songs and hit the top 30 on Billboard's Hot 100 chart.

== Track listing ==
No.	Title	Writer(s)	Producer(s)	Length
1.	"You Make Me Feel Good Inside"	Aaron Hall	Joe "Flip" Wilson	5:15
2.	"I'll Do Anything"	Aaron Hall, Melvin Wilson, Joe "Flip" Wilson	Joe "Flip" Wilson	5:13
3.	"If You Leave Me" (featuring Faith Evans)	Faith Evans, Aaron Hall	Faith Evans	4:42
4.	"All the Places (I Will Kiss You)"	Aaron Hall, Manuel Seal	Manuel Seal	4:01
5.	"What Did I Do"	Aaron Hall, Reese Johnson	Reese Johnson	5:05
6.	"Move It Girl"	Aaron Hall, Reese Johnson	Reese Johnson	5:51
7.	"I Want Your Body"	Aaron Hall, Melvin Smith, Joe "Flip" Wilson	Joe "Flip" Wilson	4:26
8.	"None Like You"	Aaron Hall, Joe "Flip" Wilson	Joe "Flip" Wilson	4:00
9.	"Going Down"	G.Clinton, Jr, Malik Pendleton	Malik Pendleton	5:50
10.	"Baby I'll Be by Your Side"	Aaron Hall, Melvin Smith, Joe "Flip" Wilson	Joe "Flip" Wilson	5:45
11.	"Don't Rush the Night"	Hal David, Aaron Hall, Reese Johnson	Reese Johnson	4:34
12.	"Thinkin' of You"	Aaron Hall, Melvin Smith, Joe "Flip" Wilson	Joe "Flip" Wilson	4:38
13.	"None but the Righteous"	Aaron Hall	Joe "Flip" Wilson	2:34
14.	"None Like You (Remix)" (featuring Fat Joe, Big Pun, Cuban Link & Unique)			4:49

Notes

- Track #11 contains replayed elements from the song "The Look of Love" written by Burt Bacharach and Hal David.

== Credits ==
- Executive-Producer – Aaron Hall, Bennie Diggs
- Mastered By – Chris Gehringer
- Mixed By – Dave Way (tracks: 1 to 3, 5 to 9, 12 to 14)
- Producer – Aaron Hall III* (tracks: 1 to 3, 5 to 14)
- Recorded By – John Wydrycs (tracks: 1, 3, 6, 8, 11, 13, 14), Kenneth Lewis* (tracks: 2, 5 to 11), Scott Kieklak (tracks: 2, 5, 6 to 12)

== Charts ==
Chart (1998)	Peak position
U.S. Billboard 200	55
U.S. Billboard Top Black Albums	11

=== Singles ===
Year	Title	Hot 100	US R&B
1998	"All The Places (I Will Kiss You)"	26	8
