= When You Need Me (Aaron Hall song) =

1994 single by Aaron Hall

Single by Aaron Hall

from the album The Truth
- Released: February 22, 1994
- Recorded: 1993
- Genre: R&B; new jack swing
- Length: 5:52
- Label: MCA; Geffen Records
- Songwriter(s): Aaron Hall; Vassal Benford
- Producer(s): Aaron Hall; Vassal Benford

Aaron Hall singles chronology
| "Get a Little Freaky With Me" (1993) | "When You Need Me" (1994) | "Let's Make Love" (1994) |

"When You Need Me" is a song performed and written by American R&B musician Aaron Hall, issued as the second single from his 1994 solo debut album The Truth. Released in the United States of America.

== Charts ==
| Chart (1994) | Peak position |
|---|---|
| U.S. Billboard Top R&B Songs | 30 |

Credits

- Lyrics By – Aaron Hall III
- Backing Vocals - Hershel Boone
- Music By – Vassal Benford
- Remix - Aaron Hall, Vassal Benford
- Producer, Instruments, Programmed By – Vassal Benford
