= Aaron Hall (singer) =

American singer (born 1964)

- Also known as: "The Voice", "Nasty Man"
- Born: Aaron Robin Hall III; August 10, 1964 (age 62); The Bronx, New York City, U.S.
- Origin: Brooklyn, New York City, U.S.
- Genres: R&B; pop; hip hop soul; new jack swing
- Occupations: Singer, songwriter
- Years active: 1987–present
- Labels: Silas; MCA
- Formerly of: Guy

Aaron Robin Hall III (born August 10, 1964) is an American singer and songwriter. Hall joined the R&B and new jack swing group Guy in 1988, which was formed by Teddy Riley and Timmy Gatling, who was later replaced by Hall's brother, Damion. The group's self-titled debut album (1988) was met with commercial success; Hall provided lead vocals on its songs "Groove Me," "I Like," and "Piece of My Love", among others.

== Early life ==
Aaron Robin Hall III was born in the Bronx, New York City, and raised in Brooklyn. His father Aaron Hall II was a recovering alcoholic, who was the manager for the group Guy. He is the second oldest son of the Hall family, along with prominent brothers as Damion Hall and Prophet Todd Hall. Hall explored his vocal talent and began singing in a Baptist church from an young age. A few years before Hall segued into his R&B career, his mother Johnella Romeo Hall was hit by a car on Christmas Eve and died.

Hall developed a speech impediment as a child that would last into adulthood, causing him to struggle to pronounce his own name and restricting his ability to give interviews during his early career. Channeling all his energies into his love for dogs, he later became a dog trainer for his celebrity peers.

== Career ==
=== 1987–1992, 1999–2000: Guy ===
Hall's talent encouraged by his friend, Timmy Gatling, who also worked alongside him in a store, Abraham & Straus in the 1980s. Gatling knew Teddy Riley through their early group called Kids at Work, which was managed by Gene Griffin. After Timmy's discovery, the three decided to form a group, Guy. The band appeared as themselves in the 1991 movie, New Jack City.

In between Hall's traditional Black gospel voice and erratic singing brought up major comparisons to artists later being in the business. Hall described his own voice as "running on inflections, heavy intonations and very little breathing".

Following the breakup of Guy, Hall signed with Silas Records, a subsidiary label of MCA Records formed by Louil Silas Jr. Hall reunited with his brother and Teddy Riley as Guy for a reunion album, Guy III (2000). It features the modest hit, "Dancin'". Hall appeared as a musical guest in the first season of the 1994 police crime drama, New York Undercover.

=== Solo ===
==== The Truth (1993) ====
Hall began his solo career after his group Guy collapsed. In 1992, he worked with several producers from the Silas label on his debut album, The Truth. It included hits like "Don't Be Afraid", "Get a Little Freaky with Me", "Let's Make Love", and others. One of his biggest singles, "I Miss You", reached #2 on the R&B chart and later peaked at #14 on the Billboard Hot 100, becoming his biggest pop hit. In later years, he created hits for movie soundtracks and collaborated with other artists.

==== Inside of You (1998) ====
Hall released a second studio album in 1998, Inside of You. After the failed Guy reunion in 1997, which only brought a track for the New York Undercover soundtrack, Hall announced he would work on another solo album the following year. He names it as a new approach in his career, including a message to harsh conditions he had experienced in the industry. The album features Faith Evans and hip-hop group Terror Squad, and it includes Fat Joe, Big Pun, Cuban Linx and Unique on a remixed track. The album had success with "All The Places (I Will Kiss You)" becoming a hit single, charting as a top 10 hit on Billboard's Top Hip Hop/R&B Songs and a top 30 song on Billboard's Hot 100 chart.

==== Adults Only: The Final Album (2005) ====
In the late 2000s, Hall resigned from MCA starting a new independent label named "Artists Only International". It was a music subsidiary of "Headstart Entertainment". He declared he was "..no longer a slave anymore" referring to his former contract with MCA. Hall experimented with different genres, mixing R&B, reggae and hip-hop together. His new approach to music received harsher critiques than usual from consumers and critics. He defined it as his "last album" and in an article teased that he would later use a new persona, a new name ("E. Kane"). His visions didn't jibe with his future plans.

== Legal issues ==
On November 24, 2023, a lawsuit was filed against Hall and Sean Combs by an unnamed woman, alleging they both sexually assaulted her and a friend after an event at Uptown Records in the early 1990s. Since the allegation, he has not been seen in public view. This has prevented the case from moving forward.

== Discography ==
=== Albums ===
Year	Album	Chart positions		Label
Year	Album	US 200	US R&B	Label
1993	The Truth	47	7	MCA
1998	Inside of You	55	11	MCA
2005	Adults Only	—	—	Head Start Music Group
"—" denotes releases that did not chart.

=== Singles ===
Year	Title	Chart positions			Album
Year	Title	US Hot 100	US R&B	UK	Album
1992	"Don't Be Afraid"	44	1	56	The Truth and Juice soundtrack
1992	"It's Gonna Be Alright" (with Charlie Wilson)	—	—	—	Boomerang soundtrack
1993	"Get a Little Freaky with Me"	—	48	66	The Truth
1993	"Let's Make Love"	—	36	—	The Truth
1994	"I Miss You"	14	2	—	The Truth
1994	"When You Need Me"	—	30	—	The Truth
1995	"Curiosity"	—	36	—	Dangerous Minds soundtrack
1995	"Soon as I Get Home" (Remix) (with Faith Evans)	—	—	—	Faith
1995	"Scent of Attraction" (with Patra)	—	82	—	Scent of Attraction
1996	"Toss It Up" (with Danny Boy, K-Ci & JoJo)	—	82	—	The Don Killuminati: The 7 Day Theory
1998	"All the Places (I Will Kiss You)"	26	8	—	Inside of You
2000	"Why You Tryin' to Play Me" (with The Notorious B.I.G.)	—	96	—	Xtra Large Entertainment Inc (Executive producers: Derrick Hodge and LeTroy Davis)
2005	"Serve That Body" (with KansasCali)	—	—	—	Adults Only: The Final Album
2006	"Much Too Soon" (with K-Ci Hailey) and Al B. Sure!)	—	—	—	My Book
"—" denotes releases that did not chart or were not released in that territory.
