= Gary G-Wiz =

- Born: Gary Rinaldo; May 3, 1969 (age 57)
- Origin: Hempstead, New York, U.S.
- Genres: Hip hop
- Occupations: Publisher; film score composer; record producer; executive producer
- Years active: 1987–present
- Formerly of: The Bomb Squad

Gary Rinaldo (born May 3, 1969), better known by the name Gary G-Wiz, is an American record producer and film score composer. Most known for being a member of the hip hop production team the Bomb Squad, G-Wiz is a longtime Public Enemy producer and contributed to many albums including: Apocalypse 91... The Enemy Strikes Black, Greatest Misses, Muse Sick-n-Hour Mess Age, Autobiography of Mistachuck, There's a Poison Goin' On, Revolverlution, and How You Sell Soul to a Soulless People Who Sold Their Soul?.

== Biography ==
G-Wiz, like many East Coast hip hop producers, began as a DJ spinning at basement parties and small clubs in Long Island and New York City in the mid-1980s.

He made the transition to record producer in the early 1990s, when he handed fellow Long Islander Chuck D a tape full of beats. The hip hop production team, The Bomb Squad, had silently gone their separate ways after Fear of a Black Planet (1990) and no new Public Enemy album was imminent. After hearing G-Wiz's music, Chuck D immediately planned to do an EP with G-Wiz being the sole producer. The two had such chemistry, the original eight cuts soon turned into 12 and Apocalypse 91... The Enemy Strikes Black was born. Apocalypse 91: The Enemy Strikes Black, as of 2007, is Public Enemy's greatest selling album to date, selling close to two million copies, and spawning the hits "Can't Truss It" and "Shut Em Down."

G-Wiz went on to produce for artists such as Janet Jackson, Aerosmith, U2, Busta Rhymes, Rakim, Run–D.M.C., Method Man, Redman, Ludacris, Twista, KRS-One, Bell Biv Devoe, Peter Gabriel, Lisa Stansfield, Aaron Hall, Big Daddy Kane, Anthrax and Sinéad O'Connor.

In 1992, G-Wiz was introduced to the world of film, where he composed the score for the Paramount Pictures film, Juice, starring Tupac Shakur, as well as producing on the film's certified platinum soundtrack. Since then, G-Wiz has contributed songs and score to Spike Lee's He Got Game, Bulworth with Warren Beatty, Paramount Pictures Mad City, Fox Television's King of the Hill, and a collaboration with Chuck D to create the main title theme to Fox's Dark Angel starring Jessica Alba. G-Wiz produced "Harder Than You Think", which climbed to No. 4 on the UK Singles Chart, becoming the highest charting Public Enemy UK single to date.

== Discography ==
Public Enemy

- Apocalypse 91... The Enemy Strikes Black (1991)
- Greatest Misses (1992)
- Muse Sick-n-Hour Mess Age (1994)
- He Got Game (1998)
- There's a Poison Goin' On (1999)
- Revolverlution (2002)
- How You Sell Soul to a Soulless People Who Sold Their Soul? (2007)
- Most of My Heroes Still Don't Appear on No Stamp (2012)
- The Evil Empire of Everything (2012)
- Man Plans God Laughs (2015)

Run–D.M.C.

- Down with the King (1993)

Chuck D (solo)

- Autobiography of Mistachuck (1996)

Hyenas in the Desert

- Die Laughing (1996)

Aaron Hall

- The Truth (1993)

Film and television

- Juice (1992)
- Digging to China (1997)
- He Got Game (1998)
- Bulworth (1998)
- Dark Angel (2001)
- Volcano High (2001)
- X Games (2003)
- ESPY Awards (2003)
- Method & Red (2004)
- The Longest Yard (2005)
- American Gangster (2007)
- Pineapple Express (2008)
- Lakeview Terrace (2008)
