= Terminator X =

American DJ (born 1966)

- Born: Norman Rogers; August 25, 1966 (age 59); Long Island, New York, US
- Genres: Hip hop
- Occupation: DJ
- Years active: 1986–1998, 2024-present

Norman Rogers (born August 25, 1966), known professionally as Terminator X, is an American DJ best known for his work with hip hop group Public Enemy, which he left in 1998. He also produced two solo albums, Terminator X & The Valley of the Jeep Beets (1991) and Super Bad (1994), featuring Chuck D, Sister Souljah, DJ Kool Herc, the Cold Crush Brothers, and a bass music track by the Punk Barbarians.

In 2013, Terminator X was inducted into the Rock and Roll Hall of Fame as a member of Public Enemy.

== Early life, family and education ==
Rogers was born in August 25, 1966, on Long Island, New York.

== Music career ==
Terminator X was among the most prominent members of the seminal rap group Public Enemy as its original DJ, helping to develop their signature sound. His use of the transformer scratch was a telltale piece of his repertoire. His imposing height and stoic attitude were noticeable characteristics. He left Public Enemy and his music career in 1999.

=== Return to touring ===
In 2024, Rogers returned to worldwide touring as a solo act. It is reported that this coincided with his separation from his wife, whom he married later in life, as the couple continues in ongoing litigation in North Carolina.

== Retirement ==
After retiring from the music scene in 1999, Rogers briefly ran an emu farm in Vance County, North Carolina. Rogers has not been involved with the farm since the early 2000s, but he is still frequently misrepresented in the media as an "ostrich farmer".

== Discography ==
=== Studio albums ===
- Terminator X & The Valley of the Jeep Beets (1991)
- Super Bad (1994)

=== with Public Enemy ===
- Yo! Bum Rush the Show (1987)
- It Takes a Nation of Millions to Hold Us Back (1988)
- Fear of a Black Planet (1990)
- Apocalypse 91... The Enemy Strikes Black (1991)
- Muse Sick-n-Hour Mess Age (1994)
- Man Plans God Laughs (2015)
