= The Bomb Squad =

American hip hop production team

- Origin: Long Island, New York, U.S.
- Genres: Hip-hop; new jack swing
- Years active: 1986 – early 2000s
- Past members: Bill Stephney; Hank Shocklee; Keith Shocklee; Chuck D Eric "Vietnam" Sadler; Gary G-Wiz

The Bomb Squad was an American hip-hop production team known for their work with hip-hop group Public Enemy.

The Bomb Squad are noted for their dense, distinct, innovative production style, often utilizing dozens of samples on just one track. They are also known for incorporating harsh, atonal sounds and samples into their productions. About.com ranked the Bomb Squad at No. 12 on its Top-25 Hip-Hop Producers list.

== Members ==
- Hank Shocklee
- Keith Shocklee
- Chuck D (credited as Carl Ryder; also member of Public Enemy)
- Eric "Vietnam" Sadler
- Gary G-Wiz (Gary Rinaldo)
- Bill Stephney
- Paul Shabazz

== Partial discography ==
=== 1987 ===
- Public Enemy – Yo! Bum Rush the Show
- Kings of Pressure – 'Give Me the Mike (Is This the End)' / 'You Know How to Reach Us'; 'Armed & Dangerous'
- True Mathematics and the Invisible Empire – 'After Dark' / 'Greeks in the House' ; 'For the Money' / 'K.A.O.S.S. (Greeks in Effect pt. 2)'; 'I Don't Love You Anymore'
- Robert S. – 'Good as Gold' / 'Big Words'
- Public Enemy - Less than Zero (soundtrack) ('Bring the Noise')

=== 1988 ===
- The 7A3 – Coolin' in Cali ('Coolin' in Cali')
- Public Enemy – It Takes a Nation of Millions to Hold Us Back
- Ziggy Marley and the Melody Makers – 'Tumblin' Down Remix'
- Paula Abdul - 'Cold Hearted (Quiverin' 12")'
- Doug E. Fresh and the Get Fresh Crew – The Worlds Greatest Entertainer ('On the Strength' & 'Keep Risin' to the Top')
- Age of Chance – 'Take It! (Unlimited Credit Mix)'
- Vanessa Williams – 'The Right Stuff (Extended Remix)'
- Maze w/ Frankie Beverly – 'Joy And Pain (Lifelines Remix)'
- Slick Rick – The Great Adventures of Slick Rick (The Moment I Feared; Let's Get Crazy; Lick the Balls; Teenage Love; Teacher, Teacher; Kit What's the Scoop)

=== 1989 ===
- The Neville Brothers - 'Sister Rosa (12" Remix)'
- Public Enemy - Do the Right Thing (soundtrack) ('Fight the Power')
- LL Cool J – Walking with a Panther ('It Gets No Rougher' & 'Nitro')
- K-9 Posse - 'It Get's No Deeper (Extended Mix)'
- Jody Watley - 'Friends (Extended Version)'
- Chaka Khan - Life Is a Dance: The Remix Project ('Slow Dancin' [Remix]')
- 3rd Bass – The Cactus Album ('Steppin' to the AM' & 'Oval Office')

=== 1990 ===
- Bell Biv Devoe – Poison ('BBD [I Thought It Was Me?]'; 'Let Me Know Something'; 'Ain't Nut'tin' Changed')
- Public Enemy – Fear of a Black Planet
- Ice Cube – AmeriKKKa's Most Wanted
- Sinéad O'Connor - 'The Emperor's New Clothes (Remix Hank Shocklee)'
- Paul Jackson Jr. – Out of the Shadows ('My Thing' & 'The New Jazz Swing')

=== 1991 ===
- Young Black Teenagers – Young Black Teenagers
- Leaders of the New School – A Future Without a Past... ('Just When You Thought It Was Safe...'; 'Sobb Story' & 'Trains, Planes and Automobiles')
- Bell Biv Devoe – WBBD-Bootcity!: The Remix Album ('Let Me Know Something [Remix]'; 'Do Me [Mental]')
- Son of Bazerk – Bazerk Bazerk Bazerk
- Public Enemy – Apocalypse 91... The Enemy Strikes Black
- Eric B & Rakim - 'Juice (Know the Ledge) [Main Mix]
- Big Daddy Kane – 'Nuff Respect' [Juice (soundtrack)]

=== 1992 ===
- Manic Street Preachers – Generation Terrorists ['Repeat (Stars and Stripes)']
- Aaron Hall – 'Don't Be Afraid (Nasty Man's Groove)'
- Material - 'Playin' With Fire (Ft. Greene Playground Knowledge Mix)'
- Public Enemy – Greatest Misses

=== 1993 ===
- Peter Gabriel – 'Steam (Oh Oh Let Off Steam Mix)'
- Janet Jackson - 'That's The Way Love Goes (That's The Remix (We Aimsta Win) #1)'
- Chilly Tee – Get Off Mine
- Run–D.M.C. – Down with the King ('3 in the Head' & 'Ooh, Whatcha Gonna Do')
- Juvenile Commttee - Free Us Colored Kids ('Juvenile Rules')
- Afro Plane - 'Shine (African Mix)' + 'Shine (Eurocentric Mix)'
- Public Enemy – Muse Sick-N-Hour Mess Age ^{[1994]}
- Public Enemy – He Got Game soundtrack ^{[1998]}
