= Chuck D =

American rapper (born 1960)

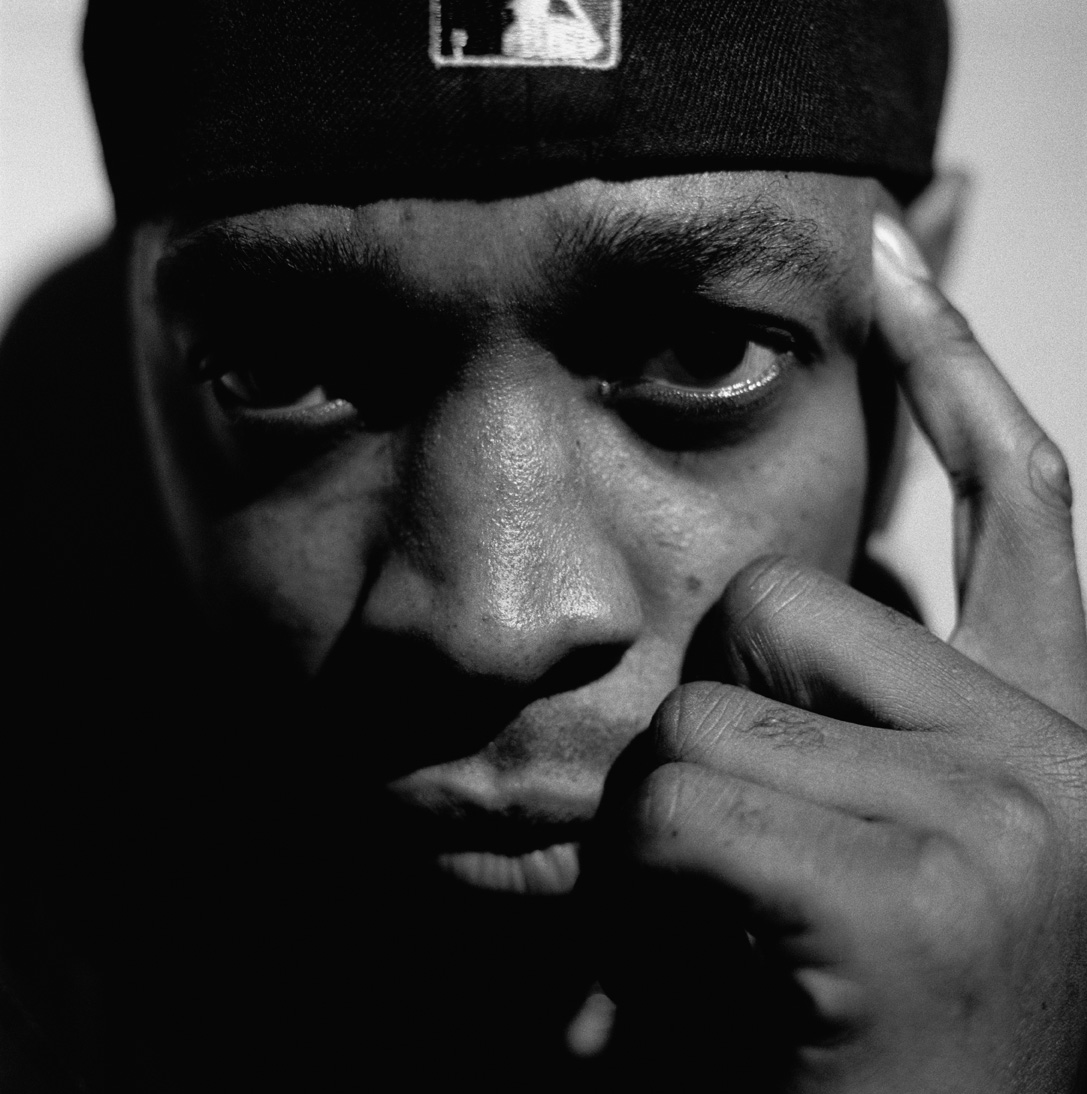
- Chuck D in 2000

Background information
- Also known as: Carl Ryder; Mistachuck; Chucky D; Chuck Dangerous; The Hard Rhymer; The Rhyme Animal
- Born: Carlton Douglas Ridenhour; August 1, 1960 (age 66); Hempstead, New York, U.S.
- Genres: Hip-hop; political hip-hop; rap metal
- Occupations: Rapper; songwriter
- Years active: 1984–present
- Member of: Public Enemy; doPE
- Formerly of: Prophets of Rage; The Bomb Squad
- Website: mrchuckd.com

Carlton Douglas "Chuck" Ridenhour (born August 1, 1960), known professionally as Chuck D, is an American rapper, best known as the leader and frontman of the hip-hop group Public Enemy, which he co-founded in 1985 with Flavor Flav. Chuck D is also a member of the rock supergroup Prophets of Rage. He has released several solo albums, most notably Autobiography of Mistachuck (1996).

His work with Public Enemy helped create politically and socially conscious hip-hop music in the mid-1980s. The Source ranked him at No. 12 on its list of the Top 50 Hip-Hop Lyricists of All Time. Chuck D has been nominated for six Grammys throughout his career, and has received the Grammy Lifetime Achievement Award as a member of Public Enemy. He was also inducted into the Rock and Roll Hall of Fame in 2013 as a member of Public Enemy.

== Early life ==
Ridenhour was born on August 1, 1960, on Long Island, New York. When he was a child, his mother played Motown and showtunes in the home and his father belonged to the Columbia Record Club. He began writing lyrics after the New York City blackout of 1977. He attended W. Tresper Clarke High School, where he was offered no formal education in music. He then went to Adelphi University on Long Island to study graphic design, where he met William Drayton Jr. (Flavor Flav). In the mid-1980s he also worked as a delivery driver for a custom color photo lab in West Hempstead called EPD color Services. He received a Bachelor of Fine Arts from Adelphi in 1984 and later received an honorary doctorate from Adelphi in 2013.

While at Adelphi, Ridenhour co-hosted hip-hop radio show the Super Spectrum Mix Hour as Chuck D on Saturday nights at Long Island rock radio station WLIR, designed flyers for local hip-hop events, and drew a cartoon called Tales of the Skind for Adelphi student newspaper The Delphian.

== Career ==
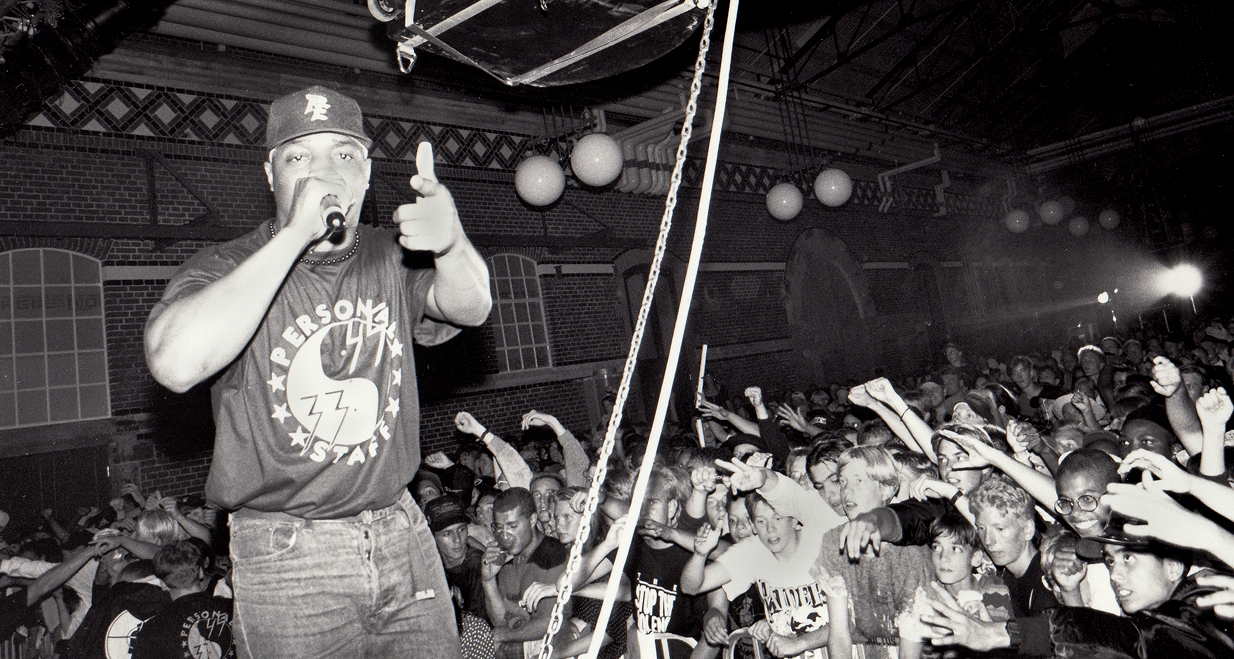
Chuck D in 1991

Ridenhour (using the nickname Chuck D) formed Public Enemy in 1985 with Flavor Flav. Upon hearing Ridenhour's demo track "Public Enemy Number One", fledgling producer/upcoming music-mogul Rick Rubin insisted on signing him to his Def Jam Records. Their major label releases were Yo! Bum Rush the Show (1987), It Takes a Nation of Millions to Hold Us Back (1988), Fear of a Black Planet (1990), Apocalypse 91... The Enemy Strikes Black (1991), the compilation album Greatest Misses (1992), and Muse Sick-n-Hour Mess Age (1994). They also released a full-length album soundtrack for the film He Got Game in 1998.

Ridenhour also contributed (as Chuck D) to several episodes of the documentary series The Blues. He has appeared as a featured artist on many other songs and albums, having collaborated with artists such as Janet Jackson, Kool Moe Dee, The Dope Poet Society, Run–D.M.C., Ice Cube, Boom Boom Satellites, Rage Against the Machine, Anthrax, John Mellencamp and many others. In 1990, he appeared on "Kool Thing", a song by the alternative rock band Sonic Youth, and along with Flavor Flav, he sang on George Clinton's song "Tweakin'", which appears on his 1989 album The Cinderella Theory. In 1993, he was the executive producer for Got 'Em Running Scared, an album by Ichiban Records group Chief Groovy Loo and the Chosen Tribe.

=== Later career ===
In 1996, Ridenhour released Autobiography of Mistachuck on Mercury Records. Chuck D made a rare appearance at the 1998 MTV Video Music Awards, presenting the Video Vanguard Award to the Beastie Boys, commending their musicianship. In November 1998, he settled out of court with Christopher "The Notorious B.I.G." Wallace's estate over the latter's sampling of his voice in the song "Ten Crack Commandments". The specific sampling is Ridenhour counting off the numbers one to nine on the track "Shut 'Em Down". He later described the decision to sue as "stupid".

In September 1999, he launched a multi-format "supersite" on the web site Rapstation.com. The site includes a TV and radio station with original programming, prominent hip-hop DJs, celebrity interviews, free MP3 downloads (the first was contributed by rapper Coolio), downloadable ringtones by ToneThis, social commentary, current events, and regular features on turning rap careers into a viable living. Since 2000, he has been one of the most vocal supporters of peer-to-peer file sharing in the music industry.

He loaned his voice to Grand Theft Auto: San Andreas as DJ Forth Right MC for the radio station Playback FM. In 2000, he collaborated with Public Enemy's Gary G-Whiz and MC Lyte on the theme music to the television show Dark Angel. He appeared with Henry Rollins in a cover of Black Flag's "Rise Above" for the album Rise Above: 24 Black Flag Songs to Benefit the West Memphis Three. In 2003, he was featured in the PBS documentary Godfathers and Sons in which he recorded a version of Muddy Waters' song "Mannish Boy" with Common, Electrik Mud Cats, and Kyle Jason. He was also featured on Z-Trip's album Shifting Gears on a track called "Shock and Awe"; a 12-inch of the track was released featuring artwork by Shepard Fairey. In 2008 he contributed a chapter to Sound Unbound: Sampling Digital Music and Culture (The MIT Press, 2008) edited by Paul D. Miller a.k.a. DJ Spooky, and also turned up on The Go! Team's album Proof of Youth on the track "Flashlight Fight." He also fulfilled his childhood dreams of being a sports announcer by performing the play-by-play commentary in the video game NBA Ballers: Chosen One on Xbox 360 and PlayStation 3.

In 2009, Ridenhour wrote the foreword to the book The Love Ethic: The Reason Why You Can't Find and Keep Beautiful Black Love by Kamau and Akilah Butler. He also appeared on Brother Ali's album Us.

In March 2011, Chuck D re-recorded vocals with The Dillinger Escape Plan for a cover of "Fight the Power".

External videos
- Interview with Chuck D at the National Museum of African American History and Culture, June 10, 2022, C-SPAN

Chuck D duetted with Rock singer Meat Loaf on his 2011 album Hell in a Handbasket on the song "Mad Mad World/The Good God Is a Woman and She Don't Like Ugly".

In 2016 Chuck D joined the band Prophets of Rage along with B-Real and former members of Rage Against the Machine.

In July 2019, Ridenhour sued Terrordome Music Publishing and Reach Music Publishing for $1 million for withholding royalties.

In 2023, Chuck D released a four-part documentary on PBS entitled "Fight the Power: How Hip Hop Changed the World."

Chuck D had narrated several podcasts, including the hip-hop origin documentary Can You Dig It?

== Rapping technique and creative process ==
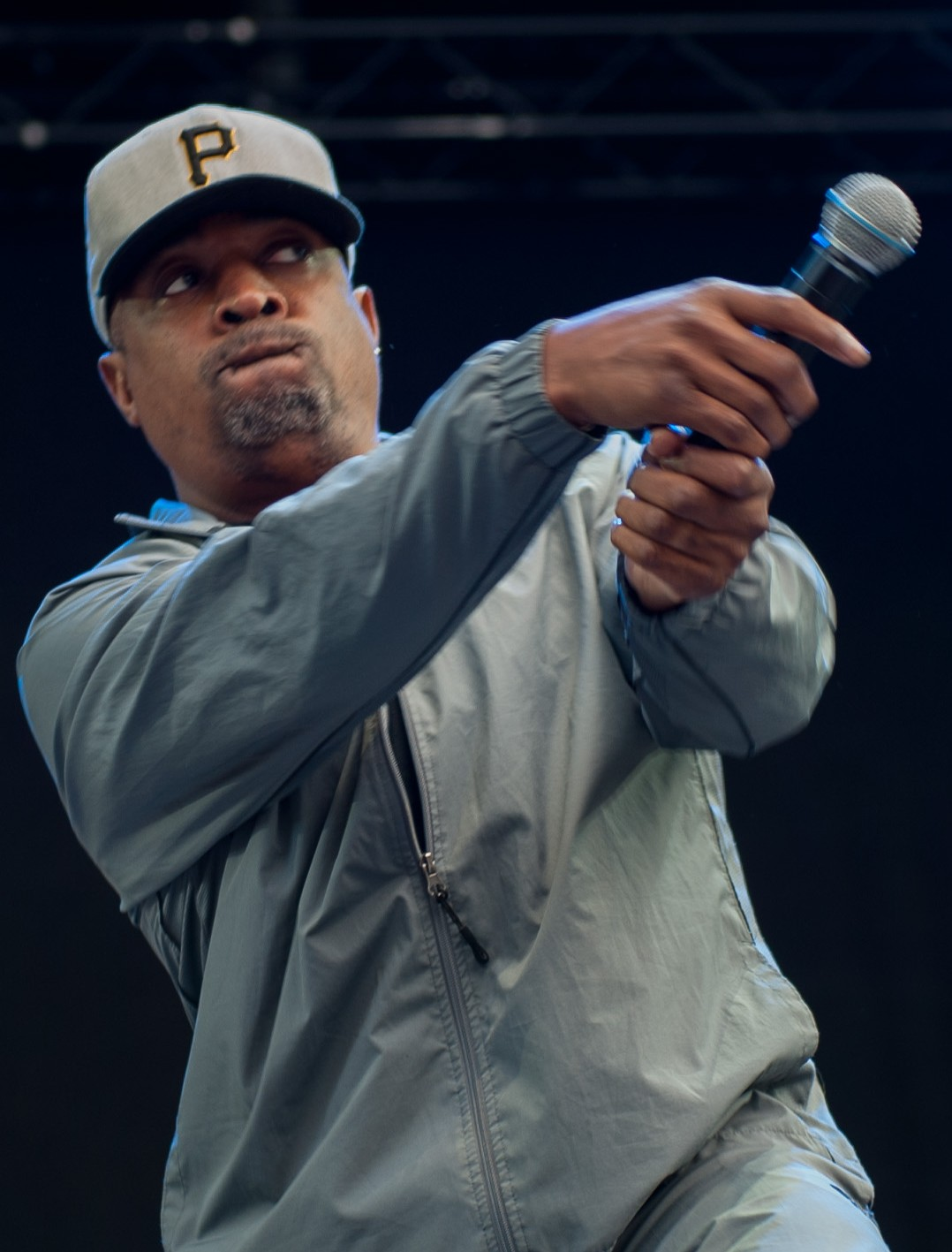
Chuck D in 2013

Chuck D is known for his powerful rapping. How to Rap says he "has a powerful, resonant voice that is often acclaimed as one of the most distinct and impressive in hip-hop". Chuck says this was based on listening to Melle Mel and sportscasters such as Marv Albert.

Chuck often comes up with a title for a song first. He writes on paper, though sometimes edits using a computer. He prefers to not punch in or overdub vocals.

Chuck listed his favourite rap albums in Hip Hop Connection in March 2000:

10. N.W.A, Straight Outta Compton
9. Boogie Down Productions, Criminal Minded
8. Run-DMC, Tougher Than Leather
7. Big Daddy Kane, Looks Like a Job For...
6. Stetsasonic, In Full Gear
5. Ice Cube, AmeriKKKa's Most Wanted
4. Dr. Dre, The Chronic
3. De La Soul, 3 Feet High and Rising
2. Eric B. & Rakim, Follow the Leader
1. Run-DMC, Raising Hell ("It was the first record that made me realise this was an album-oriented genre")

== Politics ==
Chuck D identifies as Black, as opposed to African or African-American. In a 1993 issue of DIRT Magazine covering a taping of In the Mix hosted by Alimi Ballard at the Apollo, Dan Field writes,

At one point, Chuck bristles a bit at the term "African-American." He thinks of himself as Black and sees nothing wrong with the term. Besides, he says, having been born in the United States and lived his whole life here, he doesn't consider himself African. Being in Public Enemy has given him the chance to travel around the world, an experience that really opened his eyes and his mind. He says visiting Africa and experiencing life on a continent where the majority of people are Black gave him a new perspective and helped him get in touch with his own history. He also credits a trip to the ancient Egyptian pyramids at Giza with helping him appreciate the relative smallness of man.

Ridenhour is politically active; he co-hosted Unfiltered on Air America Radio, testified before the United States Congress in support of peer-to-peer MP3 sharing, and was involved in a 2004 rap political convention. He has continued to be an activist, publisher, lecturer, and producer.

Addressing the negative views associated with rap music, he co-wrote the essay book Fight the Power: Rap, Race, and Reality with Yusuf Jah. He argues that "music and art and culture is escapism, and escapism sometimes is healthy for people to get away from reality", but sometimes the distinction is blurred and that's when "things could lead a young mind in a direction." He also founded the record company Slam Jamz and acted as narrator in Kareem Adouard's short film Bling: Consequences and Repercussions, which examines the role of conflict diamonds in bling fashion. Despite Chuck D and Public Enemy's success, Chuck D claims that popularity or public approval was never a driving motivation behind their work. He is admittedly skeptical of celebrity status, revealing in a 1999 interview with BOMB Magazine that "The key for the record companies is to just keep making more and more stars, and make the ones who actually challenge our way of life irrelevant. The creation of celebrity has clouded the minds of most people in America, Europe and Asia. It gets people off the path they need to be on as individuals."

In an interview with Le Monde, published January 29, 2008, Chuck D stated that rap is devolving so much into a commercial enterprise, that the relationship between the rapper and the record label is that of slave to a master. He believes that nothing has changed for African-Americans since the debut of Public Enemy and, although he thinks that an Obama-Clinton alliance is great, he does not feel that the establishment will allow anything of substance to be accomplished. He stated that French President Nicolas Sarkozy is like any other European elite: he has profited through the murder, rape, and pillaging of those less fortunate and he refuses to allow equal opportunity for those men and women from Africa. In this article, he defended a comment made by Professor Griff in the past that he says was taken out of context by the media. The real statement was a critique of the Israeli government and its treatment of the Palestinian people. Chuck D stated that it is Public Enemy's belief that all human beings are equal.

In 2010, Chuck D released the track "Tear Down That Wall." He said "I talked about the wall not only just dividing the U.S. and Mexico but the states of California, New Mexico and Texas. But Arizona, it's like, come on. Now they're going to enforce a law that talks about basically racial profiling."

He has been an activist with projects of The Revcoms, such as Refuse Fascism and Stop Mass Incarceration Network.

In 2022, he endorsed Conrad Tillard, formerly the Nation of Islam Minister known as Conrad Muhammad and subsequently a Baptist Minister, in his campaign for New York State Senate in District 25 (covering part of eastern and north-central Brooklyn).

Chuck D is a US Global Music Ambassador in a programme established by the US State Department and YouTube. It is part of the State Department's Global Music Diplomacy Initiative, which is designed to "elevate music as a diplomatic platform to promote peace and democracy".

He voted for Kamala Harris in the 2024 United States presidential election and has described Donald Trump as an "unprecedented dictator".

== Personal life ==
Chuck D does not drink alcohol.

Chuck D has said on Twitter that he is the maternal great-grandson of architect George Washington Foster.

As of June 2023, he has three children aged 34, 30 and 12, the two oldest by his first ex-wife, Deborah McClendon, and the youngest by his second ex-wife, Gaye Theresa Johnson.

Chuck D lives in California and lost his home in the Thomas Fire that occurred from December 2017 to January 2018.

Chuck D appears in the game NBA Ballers: Chosen One.

== TV appearances ==
- Appeared in the Behind the Music episode on Anthrax.
- Narrated and appeared on-camera for the 2005 PBS documentary Harlem Globetrotters: The Team That Changed the World.
- Appeared on-camera for the PBS program Independent Lens: Hip-Hop: Beyond Beats and Rhymes.
- Appeared in an episode of NewsRadio as himself.
- He appeared on The Henry Rollins Show.
- He was a featured panelist (with Lars Ulrich) on the May 12, 2000, episode of the Charlie Rose show. Host Charlie Rose was discussing the Internet, copyright infringement, Napster Inc., and the future of the music industry.
- He appeared on an episode of Space Ghost Coast to Coast with Pat Boone. While there, Space Ghost tried (and failed) to show he was "hip" to rap, saying his favorite rapper was M. C. Escher.
- He appeared on an episode of Johnny Bravo.
- He appeared via satellite to the UK, as a panelist on BBC's Newsnight on January 20, 2009, following Barack Obama's Inauguration.
- He appeared on a Christmas episode of Adult Swim's Aqua Teen Hunger Force.
- He appeared on VH1 Ultimate Albums Blood Sugar Sex Magik talking about the Red Hot Chili Peppers.
- He appeared on Foo Fighters: Sonic Highways in the episode talking about the beginnings of the hip-hop scene in New York City
- He is featured in the 2024 documentary Cover Your Ears produced by Prairie Coast Films and directed by Sean Patrick Shaul, discussing music censorship.
- He voiced the Marvel supervillain Beetle in Moon Girl and Devil Dinosaur.

== Music appearances ==
- In 1990, Chuck featured on Sonic Youth single "Kool Thing".
- In 1993, Chuck rapped on "New Agenda" from Janet Jackson's janet. "I loved his work, but I'd never met him," said Jackson. "I called Chuck up and told him how much I admired [Public Enemy's] work. When I hear Chuck, it's like I'm hearing someone teaching, talking to a whole bunch of people. And instead of just having the rap in the bridge, as usual, I wanted him to do stuff all the way through. I sent him a tape. He said he loved the song, but he was afraid he was going to mess it up. I said 'Are you kidding?'"
- In 1999, Chuck D appeared on Prince's hit "Undisputed" on the album Rave Un2 the Joy Fantastic.
- In 2001, Chuck D recorded the Twisted Sister song "Wake Up the Sleeping Giant" for the Twisted Sister tribute album "Twisted Forever"
- In 2001, Chuck D appeared on the Japanese electronic duo Boom Boom Satellites track "Your Reality's a Fantasy but Your Fantasy Is Killing Me" on the album Umbra.
- In 2001, Chuck D provided vocals for Public Domain's Rock Da Funky Beats.
- In 2010, Chuck D made an appearance on the track "Transformação" (Portuguese for "Transformation") from Brazilian rapper MV Bill's album Causa E Efeito (meaning Cause and Effect).
- In 2003 he was featured on the track "Access to the Excess" in Junkie XL's album Radio JXL: A Broadcast from the Computer Hell Cabin.
- In 2011 Chuck D made an appearance on the track "Mad Mad World/The Good God Is a Woman and She Don't Like Ugly" from Meat Loaf's 2011 album Hell in a Handbasket.
- In 2013, he has appeared in Mat Zo's single "Pyramid Scheme".
- In 2013 he performed at the Rock and Roll Hall of Fame Music Masters concert tribute to The Rolling Stones.
- In 2014 he performed with Jahi on "People Get Ready" and "Yo!" from the first album by Public Enemy spin-off project PE 2.0.
- In 2016 he appeared in ASAP Ferg's album "Always Strive and Prosper" on the track "Beautiful People".
- In 2017 he was featured on the track "America" on Logic's album "Everybody".
- In 2019, he appeared on "Story of Everything", a song on Threads, an album by Sheryl Crow. The track also features Andra Day and Gary Clark Jr.

== Discography ==
=== with Public Enemy ===
Studio albums

- Yo! Bum Rush the Show (1987)
- It Takes a Nation of Millions to Hold Us Back (1988)
- Fear of a Black Planet (1990)
- Apocalypse 91... The Enemy Strikes Black (1991)
- Muse Sick-n-Hour Mess Age (1994)
- He Got Game (1998)
- There's a Poison Goin' On (1999)
- Revolverlution (2002)
- New Whirl Odor (2005)
- How You Sell Soul to a Soulless People Who Sold Their Soul? (2007)
- Most of My Heroes Still Don't Appear on No Stamp (2012)
- The Evil Empire of Everything (2012)
- Man Plans God Laughs (2015)
- Nothing Is Quick in the Desert (2017)
- What You Gonna Do When the Grid Goes Down? (2020)

=== w/ Confrontation Camp ===
Studio albums

- Objects in the Mirror Are Closer Than They Appear (2001)

=== w/ Prophets of Rage ===
Studio albums

- Prophets of Rage (2017)

=== w/ doPE ===
Studio album

- No Country for Old Men (2026)

Studio EPs

- The Party's Over (2016)

=== Solo ===
Studio albums

- Autobiography of Mistachuck (1996)
- The Black in Man (2014)
- If I Can't Change the People Around Me I Change the People Around Me (2016)
- Celebration of Ignorance (2018)
- We Wreck Stadium (2023)
- Radio Armageddon (2025)

Compilation albums

- Action (DJ Matheos Worldwide International Remix) – Most*hifi (featuring Chuck D. and Huggy) (2010)
- Don't Rhyme for the Sake of Riddlin' (as Mistachuck) (2012)

==== Guest shots ====
| Year | Name | Other Guest Shots | Album |
|---|---|---|---|
| 1990 | Kool Thing | Sonic Youth | Goo |
| 1990 | Endangered Species (Tales from the Darkside) | Ice Cube | AmeriKKKa's Most Wanted |
| 1990 | Endangered Species (Tales from the Darkside) [Remix] | Ice Cube | Kill at Will |
| 1991 | Buck Whylin' | Terminator X, Sister Souljah | Terminator X & The Valley of the Jeep Beets |
| 1991 | Back from Hell (Remix) | Run-DMC, Ice Cube | Faces / Back from Hell 12" |
| 1991 | Family Got to Get Busy | H.E.A.L. | Civilization vs. Technology |
| 1991 | America Eats the Young | Marley Marl, Intelligent Hoodlum | In Control Volume II (For Your Steering Pleasure) |
| 1991 | Time to Come Correct | Prince Akeem | Coming Down Like Babylon |
| 1991 | Rise N' Shine | Kool Moe Dee, KRS-One | Funke, Funke Wisdom |
| 1992 | State of Accommodation: Why Aren't You Mad? | Sister Souljah | 360 Degrees of Power |
| 1992 | 40 Acres and a Mule | Success-N-Effect | Drive By of Uh Revolutionist |
| 1993 | Close the Crackhouse | Professor X the Overseer, Big Daddy Kane, Digital Underground, Wise Intelligent | Puss N' Boots (The Struggle Continues...) |
| 1993 | New Agenda | Janet Jackson | Janet |
| 1994 | Sticka | Terminator X, MC Lyte, Ice Cube, Ice T | Super Bad |
| 1994 | Step | Freddie Foxxx | Crazy like a Foxxx {unreleased} |
| 1994 | Rumbo n da Jungo | The Wreck League | Street Fighter (1994 soundtrack) |
| 1995 | It's the Pride | —N/a | Pump Ya Fist (soundtrack) |
| 1995 | Where Ya At? | Various | One Million Strong |
| 1995 | Destroy All Masters | Melquan | One Million Strong |
| 1995 | Hyperbollicsyllabicsesqueadalymystic | Isaac Hayes | Branded |
| 1997 | Down to Now | The Last Poets | Time Has Come |
| 1998 | At Least American Indian People Know Exactly How They've Been Fucked Around (Mad Professor Mix) | The Fire This Time | Still Dancing on John Wayne's Head |
| 1999 | Mumia 911 | Various MC's | Single |
| 1999 | Military Ridaz | Soldierz at War | S.A.W. |
| 1999 | Survival A.K.A. Black Survivors | Bob Marley | Chant Down Babylon |
| 1999 | Undisputed | Prince | Rave Un2 the Joy Fantastic |
| 2000 | Burned Hollywood Burned | The Roots, Zack de la Rocha | Bamboozled (soundtrack) |
| 2001 | Wake Up the Sleeping Giant | —N/a | Twisted Forever |
| 2001 | Your Reality's a Fantasy But Your Fantasy Is Killing Me | Boom Boom Satellites | Umbra |
| 2001 | Elvis Killed Kennedy | Vanilla Ice~~(!)~~ | Bi-Polar |
| 2001 | Cuttin' Heads | John Mellencamp | Cuttin' Heads |
| 2002 | Pressin' On | Bootsy Collins | Play with Bootsy |
| 2003 | Politics of the Business | Prince Paul, Ice T | Politics of the Business |
| 2004 | Hot Gossip | Blues Explosion | Damage |
| 2005 | Bin Laden pt. 2 | Immortal Technique, KRS-One | Single |
| 2005 | Shock and Awe | Z-Trip | Shifting Gears |
| 2005 | Sing a Simple Song | Sly and the Family Stone, Isaac Hayes, D'Angelo | Different Strokes by Different Folks |
| 2007 | The Reverse | Archie Shepp | Gemini |
| 2008 | Winter in America | Paris | Acid Reflex |
| 2008 | Today's Topics | KRS-One | Adventures in Emceein |
| 2008 | Self-Esteem | Nelly | Brass Knuckles |
| 2009 | Money | N.A.S.A. | The Spirit of Apollo |
| 2009 | Brothers and Sisters | Brother Ali | Us |
| 2009 | Say Yeah | Sharam | Get Wild |
| 2009 | A Box on the Broken Ball | Brain Failure | Downtown Production |
| 2010 | Civil War | Immortal Technique, Killer Mike, Brother Ali | The Martyr |
| 2011 | Hip Hop @ Funk U | Ice Cube, Snoop Dogg | Tha Funk Capital of the World |
| 2011 | The Good God Is a Woman and She Don't Like Ugly | Meat Loaf | Hell in a Handbasket |
| 2013 | Pyramid Scheme | Mat Zo | Damage Control |
| 2013 | Whaddup | LL Cool J, Tom Morello, Z-Trip, Travis Barker | Authentic |
| 2014 | The People | De La Soul | Single |
| 2014 | Fight | Ed O.G. | After All These Years |
| 2015 | I Can't Breathe | Marcus Miller, Mocean Worker | Afrodeezia |
| 2016 | Lazy Eye | Aesop Rock | The Impossible Kid |
| 2016 | Y.B.I. | Masta Ace | The Falling Season |
| 2016 | Beautiful People | ASAP Ferg, Mama Ferg | Always Strive and Prosper |
| 2017 | Illusions | Bootsy Collins, Buckethead, Blvckseeds | World Wide Funk |
| 2017 | Comin' Like a Rhino | DMC | Back from the Dead |
| 2017 | America | Logic, Big Lenbo, No I.D., Black Thought | Everybody |
| 2019 | Story of Everything | Sheryl Crow, Adra Day, Gary Clark Jr. | Threads |
| 2020 | Remove 45 | Styles P, Talib Kweli, Pharoahe Monch, Mysonne | Single |
| 2020 | Malice of Mammon | R.A. the Rugged Man | All My Heroes Are Dead |
| 2020 | Are You Ready | Goodie Mob | Survival Kit |
| 2020 | A Riot in My Mind | Common, Lenny Kravitz | A Beautiful Revolution Pt. 1 |
| 2022 | Man in Black | Bob Log III | JR Vol 3: A Tribute to Johnny Cash |
| 2022 | Power | Chill Rob G | Empires Crumble |
| 2022 | Miracle | Betty Boo | Boomerang |
| 2023 | Black Stolen | Tony Touch, Bobby Sessions | The Def Tape |
| 2023 | The Amazing Willie Mays | Nabaté Isles | We Wreck Stadiums |
| 2023 | Hip Hop Saves Lives | Arrested Development | Single |
| 2024 | The Getdown | The Impossibulls | Everything Has Changed, Nothing Is Different |
| 2024 | The World Is Cooked | Craig G | The World Is Cooked |
| 2024 | What Has America Done | Consequence | Non-album single |
| 2025 | Courtesy Call | Skyzoo | Keep Me Company |
| | When They're Gone (Hip-Hop Salute) | Chas Bronxson | Single |
| | Let's Go | Chill Rob G | Survival of the Better |

== Music videos (as guest) ==
| 1989 | Self Destruction | Stop the Violence Movement |
| 1990 | Kool Thing | Sonic Youth |
| 1991 | Buck Whylin' | Terminator X, Sister Souljah |
| 1991 | Time to Come Correct | Prince Akeem |
| 1991 | Rise N Shine | Kool Moe Dee, KRS One |
| 1993 | Close the Crackhouse | Professor X the Overseer, Big Daddy Kane, Digital Underground, Wise Intelligent |
| 1995 | Where Ya At | Various Artists |
| 2013 | Pyramid Scheme | Mat Zo |
| 2014 | Fight | Ed O.G. |
| 2016 | Y.B.I. | Masta Ace |
| 2019 | Story of Everything | Sheryl Crow, Adra Day, Gary Clark Jr. |
| 2022 | Malice of Mammon | R.A. the Rugged Man |
| 2022 | Miracle | Betty Boo |
| 2023 | Hip Hop Saves Lives | Arrested Development |
| 2024 | What Has America Done | Consequence |

== Selected publications ==
- Chuck D; Yusuf Jah (1997). Fight the Power: Rap, Race, and Reality (1st ed.). Dell Publishing Company. ISBN 978-0-8624-1720-8.
- Chuck D; Yusuf Jah (2006). Lyrics of a Rap Revolutionary Volume One. Office Da Books. ISBN 978-0-9749-4841-6.
- Chuck D; Duke Eatmon; Ron Maskell; Lorrie Boula; Jonathan Bernstein; Shepard Fairey (2017). Chuck D Presents This Day in Rap and Hip-Hop History. Black Dog & Leventhal. ISBN 978-0-3164-3097-5.
