= Black Steel in the Hour of Chaos =

Single by Public Enemy

from the album It Takes a Nation of Millions to Hold Us Back
- A-side: "Black Steel in the Hour of Chaos"
- B-side: "B-Side Wins Again"
- Released: January 6, 1989
- Recorded: 1988
- Genre: Hip hop, political hip hop
- Length: 6:01 (single); 6:23 (album) "B-Side Wins Again": 3:49
- Label: Def Jam
- Songwriters: Carl Ridenhour; Hank Shocklee; Eric "Vietnam" Sadler; William Drayton
- Producer: The Bomb Squad

Public Enemy singles chronology
"Night of the Living Baseheads" (1988)	"Black Steel in the Hour of Chaos" (1989)	"Fight the Power" (1989)

"Black Steel in the Hour of Chaos" is a song on the American hip hop group Public Enemy's 1988 album, It Takes a Nation of Millions to Hold Us Back. It was released as a single in 1989. The song tells the story of a conscientious objector who makes a prison escape. It is built on a high-pitched piano sample from Isaac Hayes' "Hyperbolicsyllabicsesquedalymistic", from 1969's Hot Buttered Soul.

== Song ==
The vocals are mostly by lead rapper Chuck D, with sidekick Flavor Flav appearing between verses, seemingly speaking to Chuck over the phone. Flavor went to another room and called the studio to achieve this effect.

It features a slower, more melodic beat than other songs on It Takes a Nation of Millions to Hold Us Back. Aside from the aforementioned Hayes sample, the song samples "Little Green Apples" by The Escorts and "Living for the City" by Stevie Wonder.

The lines in the scratch breaks – "Now they got me in a cell" and "Death Row/What a brother knows" – are samples from "Bring the Noise", another song on the same album.

The lyric "anti-nigger machine" became the title of a song on the group's next album, Fear of a Black Planet.

== B-Side ==
"B-Side Wins Again" is a song that was not featured on It Takes a Nation of Millions to Hold Us Back but only featured on the 2014 deluxe edition of the album, it was originally recorded around in 1987 before or after the Yo! Bum Rush the Show era.

The song was remixed with other samples on the next album, Fear of a Black Planet.

== Music video ==
The music video was filmed in the abandoned cell blocks of the nationally landmarked old Essex County Jail in Newark, New Jersey. The official video was directed by Adam Bernstein. According to Bernstein, Public Enemy wanted Joey Ramone to play a prisoner. Ramone refused, as group member Professor Griff – despite not appearing in the video – had been reported making antisemitic remarks.

== Single track listing ==
1. "Black Steel in the Hour of Chaos (Radio version)" - 6:01
2. "Black Steel in the Hour of Chaos (Instrumental)" - 1:17
3. "Too Much Posse" - 2:25
4. "Caught, Can I Get a Witness? (Pre Black Steel Ballistic Felony Dub)" - 5:04
5. "B-Side Wins Again" - 3:49

== Charts ==
Chart (1988)	Peak position
U.S. Billboard Hot R&B/Hip-Hop Singles & Tracks	86
U.S. Billboard Hot Rap Singles	11

== Covers ==
- Brazilian metal band Sepultura covered the song.
- Chuck D has performed the song with Asian Dub Foundation and Rage Against the Machine. In 1998, a live version from 1996, featuring Chuck, appeared on Rage Against The Machine's Live & Rare.
- English trip hop musician Tricky released a cover entitled "Black Steel" – with Martina Topley-Bird on vocals, backed by the techno-rock band FTV – on his debut album Maxinquaye (1995). The stripped-down sound of the original is replaced by pounding drums and guitars. Topley-Bird sings the lyrics instead of rapping.

== Samples of the song ==
- "Hyperbolicsyllabicsesquedalymistic" was also used by DJ Muggs for "The Puppet Master", featuring B-Real and Dr. Dre, on the Soul Assassins, Chapter 1 album.
- The same Isaac Hayes sample is used by The Game in the Just Blaze-produced song "Remedy" on the album Doctor's Advocate. Chuck D's line "They got me in a cell" from "Black Steel" is scratched in the hook.
- The beginning of the song is sampled heavily in "Make Some Noise" by "Dougal & Gammer".

== Legacy ==
Poster for the 2016 docudrama In the Hour of Chaos.

The title and cover art of writer/director Bayer Mack's 2016 American documentary drama In the Hour of Chaos – which tells the story of the Reverend Martin Luther King, Sr.'s ("Daddy King") rise from an impoverished childhood in the violent backwoods of Georgia to become patriarch of one of the most famous, and tragedy-plagued, families in history – are influenced by Public Enemy's song. The original trailer for the docudrama featured a portion of "Hyperbolicsyllabicsesquedalymistic" by Isaac Hayes. In the Hour of Chaos aired on public television July 25, 2016.

"I don't feel like there's ever been music that's been political in this way that's been so bad-ass," observed musician Joan as Police Woman. "It's so raw, angry [and] extremely intelligent… The music's really cutting and funky, but not in the way you'd hear it now. It's not refined, all the samples are jarring, and the drums are really harsh. It's very punk rock! There's no other rap song that I've learned every word of, and people will be astounded that it was ever made." (Joan As Police Woman covered another Nation of Millions song, "She Watch Channel Zero?!", on her album Cover.)
