= Don't Believe the Hype =

Single by Public Enemy

from the album It Takes a Nation of Millions to Hold Us Back
- B-side: "Prophets of Rage" & "The Rhythm The Rebel"
- Released: June 1988
- Genre: Political hip hop
- Length: 5:23
- Label: Def Jam; Columbia; CBS Records
- Songwriters: Carl Ridenhour; Hank Shocklee; Eric "Vietnam" Sadler; William Drayton
- Producer: The Bomb Squad

Public Enemy singles chronology
"Bring the Noise" (1987)	"Don't Believe the Hype" (1988)	"Night of the Living Baseheads" (1988)

Music video
- "Don't Believe the Hype" on YouTube

"Don't Believe the Hype" is a song by hip hop group Public Enemy and the second single to be released from their second album, It Takes a Nation of Millions to Hold Us Back. The song's lyrics are mostly about the political issues that were current in the United States at the time of its release. "Don't Believe the Hype" charted at number 18 on the U.S. R&B chart and also reached a high of 18 in the UK Singles Chart in July 1988. Chuck D has stated the song was inspired by the works of Noam Chomsky.

The B-side includes "Prophets of Rage" and "The Rhythm The Rebel", an a cappella of the opening verse from "Rebel Without a Pause" which was a popular scratching phrase.

== Charts ==
Chart (1988)	Peak position
U.S. Billboard Dance Music/Club Play Singles	21
U.S. Billboard Hot R&B Singles	18
U.S. Billboard Hot Dance Music/Maxi-Singles Sales	17
