= Rebel Without a Pause =

Single by Public Enemy

from the album It Takes a Nation of Millions to Hold Us Back
- B-side: "Sophisticated Bitch"
- Released: July 28, 1987
- Recorded: 1987
- Genre: Political hip hop
- Length: 5:02 (album version); 4:21 (single)
- Label: Def Jam
- Songwriters: Ridenhour; Sadler; Shocklee; Rogers
- Producer: The Bomb Squad

Public Enemy singles chronology
"You're Gonna Get Yours" (1987)	"Rebel Without a Pause" (1987)	"Bring the Noise" (1987)

"Rebel Without a Pause" is a song by hip hop group Public Enemy and the first single from their 1988 album, It Takes a Nation of Millions to Hold Us Back. The title is a reference to the 1955 film Rebel Without a Cause.

== History ==
"Rebel Without a Pause" was the first song created for It Takes a Nation of Millions to Hold Us Back. The group had recently finished a tour with fellow Def Jam artists LL Cool J and Eric B. & Rakim, among others. According to Chuck D., the group felt that their prior album Yo! Bum Rush The Show was already dated, as production innovations had occurred during the album's release that he felt made it sound like a timestamp of 1986. Chuck D and Bomb Squad leader Hank Shocklee wanted to push the innovation in hip hop instead of follow it and decided one key idea to separate themselves from other hip hop acts was to speed the BPM of the songs. Chuck D said in an interview "Most rap records at the time had a BPM of 98 BPM. Our stuff was around 109." They had experimented with faster beats at concerts and loved the added energy it gave the crowd so decided they wanted to make a record to capture their live energy.

Shocklee got the idea to sample an alto saxophone glissando from the J.B.'s instrumental "The Grunt", which became the track's distinctive whistling sound. He had a Mirage sampler that was only able to hold 4 bits' worth of audio (or 3 seconds) to create his demo to give to Chuck to write his rhymes. When they got to a studio and had a superior sampler, the S-900 that held 30 seconds of audio, they felt it took away the impact of the Mirage sample, which forced in a second of delay before the sample reloaded as opposed to the endless loop the studio's sampler gave, and decided to go with it instead. The song is widely remembered for the high-pitched scream effect sampled from "The Grunt". The same glissando sample was reversed and used in another track by Public Enemy—"Terminator X To the Edge of Panic". The Bomb Squad could not find a drum sample they felt was adequate for what they wanted to create, so they instead had Flavor Flav, who was the best drummer of the group, play an original beat on their electronic drum. Chuck D wrote the rhymes in less than a day and took three takes before he was happy with his performance in the studio. Originally Public Enemy's longtime musical associate Johnny Juice was going to come in to record the scratching, but Public Enemy's live DJ Terminator X asked if they'd give him a chance to scratch on the song because he had some ideas for it and scratched out the famous "Rock And Roll" sample, which was dubbed "The Transformers Scratch" (taken from the belief that the scratch sounded like the noises the robots on the Transformers cartoon made when they transformed). Shocklee made the final mix with Steve Ett and upon hearing the finished product, Chuck D announced, "I could die tomorrow. Because that record right there? Nothing could f**king go nowhere near it."

The song was certified as an instant classic by music critics and fans upon its release. Shocklee remembers knowing it was going to be a hit when he saw the reaction from the live crowds. "Public Enemy was performing, and they went halfway through the set. And halfway through the set Rebel came on. And I saw kids just running in the (Madison Square) Garden just like kids stealing their chains and shit, alright, because that was the highball, that was like the—the scene was a fight breaking out on the floor. But there wasn't no fight, that was just the energy."

The song appeared in 2004 videogame Grand Theft Auto: San Andreas on the in-game radio station Playback FM.

== Music video ==
The official video begins with a title card 'The Terminator X Interview' with the "Flash" sample from "Terminator X to the Edge of Panic". The group are then shown being interviewed on 'PE TV' where the interviewer asks Terminator, "Not the speaking kind, eh?" He doesn't respond, and Chuck D says "Cheers" to the interviewer. The video then cuts to footage of the DMC International Awards London 1988 and Public Enemy winning Best Hip-Hop Record for "Rebel Without a Pause". Flavor Flav tells the presenter to find the 12" vinyl of "Bring the Noise" and flips it over to the other side. The video then features the audio from a live performance of the track (not the studio recording), intercut with video from various live performances of the song. It ends with TV footage of Flav addressing the camera saying, "Now this is the deal. We go to Japan and we show them what we got." The music video was included on the Sound + Vision edition of It Takes a Nation of Millions to Hold Us Back released in 2004 which featured a bonus DVD of four official music videos from the album.
