= You're Gonna Get Yours =

Single by Public Enemy

from the album Yo! Bum Rush the Show
- Released: 1987
- Recorded: 1986
- Genre: Hip hop
- Length: 4:04
- Label: Def Jam
- Songwriter(s): Chuck D; Hank Shocklee

Public Enemy singles chronology
"Public Enemy #1" (1986)	"You're Gonna Get Yours" (1987)	"Rebel Without a Pause" (1987)

"You're Gonna Get Yours" (sometimes subtitled "My 98 Oldsmobile") is a 1987 single by hip hop group Public Enemy from their debut album Yo! Bum Rush the Show (1987). Chuck D references the Oldsmobile 98 automobile in the song's lyrics. It peaked at number 88 on the UK Singles Chart. According to Rolling Stone, the song helped Chuck D and production team Bomb Squad "[introduce] an intense, booming new sound and an urgent social and political message to rap music".

MARRS sampled the song in their 1987 hit single "Pump Up the Volume". Public Enemy fans Red Hot Chili Peppers have been known to use the song as an intro jam during live performances of their own song, "Give It Away".

The song was also featured in the 1999 British-Irish independent film Human Traffic.
