= Hollywood (Flavor Flav album) =

Studio album by Flavor Flav
- Released: October 31, 2006
- Genre: Hip-hop
- Length: 1:17:13
- Label: Draytown
- Producer: Flavor Flav; Andrew Williams; Cha Cho; Charles "Cha Lo" Hester; Clint "Payback" Sands; Craig Williams; Derrik Blocker; Kyle Hudnall; Producers Coalition; Tracy Pierce

Singles from Hollywood
- 1. "Git On Down / The Hot 1" Released: December 7, 1999

Professional ratings
Review scores
Source	Rating
AllMusic	2.5/5 stars
HipHopDX	2.5/5
RapReviews	7/10
The Guardian	2/5 stars
The Source	2.5/5 stars

Hollywood is the only solo studio album by American rapper Flavor Flav. It was released on October 31, 2006 through Draytown Records, being in production for at least seven years with the oldest track being "Hot 1" first released as a single in 1999. Production was mostly handled by Flav himself with Charles "Cha Lo" Hester, Clint "Payback" Sands, Craig Williams, Producers Coalition, Andrew Williams, Cha Cho, Derrik Blocker, Kyle Hudnall, and Tracy Pierce. It features the lone guest appearance from Smooth B. The album reached No. 44 on the Billboard Top Heatseekers chart and No. 80 on the Billboard Top R&B/Hip-Hop Albums chart.

The song "Unga Bunga Bunga" appeared in a season four episode of Breaking Bad. The songs "Flavor Man", "Bridge Of Pain" and "Col-Leepin" later appeared on Public Enemy's 2007 album How You Sell Soul to a Soulless People Who Sold Their Soul?.

== Track listing ==
No.	Title	Writer(s)	Producer(s)	Length
1.	"Let It Show"	William Drayton	Tracy Pierce; Flavor Flav	4:47
2.	"Flavor Man"	W. Drayton	Flavor Flav	3:47
3.	"Unga Bunga Bunga"	W. Drayton	Clint "Payback" Sands; Flavor Flav	3:58
4.	"Two Wrongz"	W. Drayton	Charles "Cha Lo" Hester; Craig Williams; Flavor Flav	4:06
5.	"I Ain't Scared"	W. Drayton	Clint "Payback" Sands; Flavor Flav	3:33
6.	"Baby Baby Baby"	W. Drayton	Flavor Flav	4:30
7.	"Wonder Why"	W. Drayton; R. Lincoln	Andrew Williams; Flavor Flav	3:43
8.	"Interlude: Latasha Break"			0:57
9.	"No Loot"	W. Drayton; Joe Love	Flavor Flav	3:04
10.	"The Jookz"	W. Drayton; Timothy Drayton	Cha Cho; Flavor Flav	3:30
11.	"For the Rest of My Life"	W. Drayton	Flavor Flav	5:50
12.	"Hot 1"	W. Drayton; R. Lincoln	Flavor Flav	3:38
13.	"Platinum"	W. Drayton	Kyle Hudnall; Flavor Flav	3:23
14.	"Guess Who's Bak"	W. Drayton; Darrol Durant	Producers Coalition; Flavor Flav	3:09
15.	"Get up on the Dance Floor"	W. Drayton	Charles "Cha Lo" Hester; Craig Williams; Flavor Flav	3:40
16.	"Bridge of Pain"	W. Drayton	Producers Coalition; Flavor Flav	3:09
17.	"One and Only Original Flav"	W. Drayton	Derrik Blocker; Flavor Flav	4:47
18.	"Col-Leepin"	W. Drayton	Flavor Flav	4:29
19.	"Bonus Track" (featuring Smooth B.)	Daryl Barnes		4:30
20.	"Hotter Than Ice"	W. Drayton	Flavor Flav	4:43
Total length:				1:17:13

== Charts ==
Chart (2006)	Peak position
US Top R&B/Hip-Hop Albums (Billboard)	80
US Heatseekers Albums (Billboard)	44
