= Flav's Fried Chicken =

Coordinates: 41.8538°N 90.1865°W

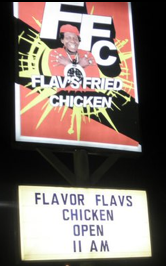
- Flav's Fried Chicken Sign
- Interactive map of Flav's Fried Chicken

Restaurant information
- Established: January 2011
- Closed: April 2011
- Food type: Fried chicken, Soul food
- Location: 916 N Second St, Clinton, Iowa

Flav's Fried Chicken (FFC) was a fried chicken restaurant in Clinton, Iowa cofounded by American hype man Flavor Flav in January 2011. The restaurant closed in April 2011.

== Operations ==
Flavor Flav partnered with Nick Cimino to open Flav's Fried Chicken in Cimino's hometown of Clinton, Iowa. Flav met Cimino through his brother Peter, who runs Mama Cimino's in Las Vegas. After enjoying the rapper's homemade fried chicken, Peter Cimino began selling chicken wings using Flav's recipe.

The founders hoped that Flav's Fried Chicken would be the first of a national restaurant franchise; like KFC, it used a secret recipe.

== Closure ==
Flav's Fried Chicken closed on Sunday, April 24, 2011. The circumstances behind the closing of the restaurant are disputed, with both Flav and Cimino attributing blame to each other.

Flav said he found potato salad expired during a trip to the restaurant. Cimino and employees denied those claims. Flav said he was pulling his name from FFC, because Cimino "mismanaged" the place and gave Flav a "bad reputation."

Cimino stated that Flav "came here and didn't know anything about the restaurant business." Flav said he was shutting the doors because "Cimino isn't running the business right", and employees were not getting paid. Cimino said a mistake happened with a credit card machine and claimed all wages had since been paid, although Cimino has a history of not paying employees.

Cimino said that the restaurant was pulling in enough profit, and the financial situation was not a reason to close. Cimino claimed that Flav didn't provide cash to the operation. He also alleged a lack of restaurant ownership knowledge, drug use and absenteeism on the part of Flav. Cimino cited other instances, like Flav's allegedly costing the business $14,000 by wanting to change the oil every hour.

== See also ==
- List of fast-food chicken restaurants
