= Night of the Living Baseheads =

Single by Public Enemy

from the album It Takes a Nation of Millions to Hold Us Back
- B-side: "Cold Lampin' with Flavor"; "Terminator X to the Edge of Panic"; "The Edge of Panic"
- Released: October 4, 1988
- Recorded: 1988
- Studio: Greene Street Studios
- Genre: Political hip hop
- Length: 3:15
- Label: Def Jam
- Songwriter(s): Carlton "Chuck D" Ridenhour; Eric "Vietnam" Sadler; Hank Shocklee
- Producer(s): The Bomb Squad

Public Enemy singles chronology
"Don't Believe the Hype" (1988)	"Night of the Living Baseheads" (1988)	"Black Steel in the Hour of Chaos" (1989)

Music video
- "Night of the Living Baseheads" on YouTube

"Night of the Living Baseheads" is the third single released in 1988 by hip hop group Public Enemy, from their critically acclaimed album It Takes a Nation of Millions to Hold Us Back. The lyrics deal with the effects of crack cocaine on African-Americans during the 1980s crack epidemic, referring to the slang for freebase cocaine "base" or crack cocaine. The song reached #62 on the U.S. Hot R&B/Hip-Hop Singles & Tracks.

The song uses more samples than any other song on the album, a total of 20 (including the sample of Chuck D saying "Bass!" at the start of the song "Bring the Noise"). The chorus of the song that asks "How low can you go?", refers to a person degrading himself/herself, rather than a dance. The title is a reference to the film Night of the Living Dead, equating people addicted to crack cocaine with zombies.

Radical Afrocentrist, Black Panther and Nation of Islam spokesman Khalid Muhammad is sampled on "Night of the Living Baseheads" opening the song with the words "Have you forgotten that once we were brought here, we were robbed of our name, robbed of our language. We lost our religion, our culture, our God ... and many of us, by the way we act, we even lost our minds."

== Music video ==
The official music video for the song was directed by Lionel C. Martin. It features MC Lyte as a reporter and Flavor Flav appears as co-anchor of a fictional T.V. news program, PETV. The video shows footage of the Audubon Ballroom in Washington Heights, New York City (After Malcolm X left the Nation of Islam in 1964, he founded the Organization of Afro-American Unity (OAAU). The weekly meetings of the OAAU were held at the Audubon Ballroom and it was at one of those meetings, on February 21, 1965, that Malcolm X was assassinated.) During the video, MC Lyte searches for 'baseheads' and finds them on Wall Street where executives are caught sniffing cocaine, pointing out that drug use is viewed differently among black and white communities. In another scene, Chuck D is captured by the racist, anti-rap group the "Brown Bags". In the middle of the music video, a T.V. commercial is shown of a "beeper tie" which allows drug dealers to appear respectable, and in another scene a reporter investigates a crack house, showing what crack addiction does to families.

== Cover versions ==
In 1996, the song was covered by Terminal 46 for the electro-industrial various artists compilation Operation Beatbox. The group Digital Assassins also did a cover of the song, entitled "Return of the Living Bassheads (Somethin' Really Bad)." This cover was featured on video games such as Mat Hoffman's Pro BMX 2 and BMX XXX. The group Insane Clown Posse also did a cover of this track that was entitled "Night of the Living Bassheads". This cover is to be released for The Mighty Death Pop!'s bonus cover album Smothered, Covered & Chunked.

“Night of the Living Baseheads” was sampled by Animal Cannibals in their 1993 breakthrough hit, “Yozsefváros.”

== Charts ==
Chart (1988)	Peak position
US Hot R&B Singles (Billboard)	62
