= It Takes a Nation of Millions to Hold Us Back =

Studio album by Public Enemy
- Released: June 28, 1988
- Recorded: 1987–1988
- Studios: Chung King House of Metal and Greene Street (New York City); Sabella (Roslyn); Spectrum City (Hempstead)
- Genres: East Coast hip hop; political rap; sampledelia; boom bap
- Length: 57:51
- Labels: Def Jam; Columbia
- Producers: Chuck D; Rick Rubin; Hank Shocklee

Public Enemy chronology
Yo! Bum Rush the Show (1987)	It Takes a Nation of Millions to Hold Us Back (1988)	Fear of a Black Planet (1990)

Singles from It Takes a Nation of Millions to Hold Us Back
- 1. "Rebel Without a Pause" Released: July 28, 1987; 2. "Bring the Noise" Released: December 29, 1987; 3. "Don't Believe the Hype" Released: June 1988; 4. "Night of the Living Baseheads" Released: October 4, 1988; 5. "Black Steel in the Hour of Chaos" Released: January 6, 1989

It Takes a Nation of Millions to Hold Us Back is the second studio album by American hip hop group Public Enemy, released on June 28, 1988, by Def Jam Recordings and Columbia Records. It was recorded from 1987 to 1988 in sessions at Chung King Studios, Greene St. Recording, and Sabella Studios in New York.

Noting the enthusiastic response toward their live shows, Public Enemy intended to make the album's music at a higher tempo than their 1987 debut Yo! Bum Rush the Show for performance purposes. The group also set out to create the hip hop equivalent of Marvin Gaye's What's Going On (1971), an album noted for its strong social commentary. Through their production team the Bomb Squad, Public Enemy introduced a densely aggressive sound influenced by free jazz, heavy funk, and musique concrète as a backdrop for lead rapper Chuck D, who employed sociopolitical rhetoric, revolutionary attitudes, and dense vocabulary in his performances.

It Takes a Nation of Millions to Hold Us Back charted for 47 weeks on the US Billboard 200, peaking at number 42, and was certified Platinum by the RIAA in 1989. The album received widespread acclaim from critics, who praised its production techniques and Chuck D's socially and politically charged lyricism. It also appeared on many publications' year-end top album lists for 1988 and was the runaway choice as the best album of 1988 in The Village Voice's Pazz & Jop critics' poll, a poll of the leading music critics in the US.

Since its initial reception, It Takes a Nation of Millions to Hold Us Back has been regarded by music writers and publications as one of the greatest and most influential albums of all time. In 2000, it was voted number 92 in Colin Larkin's book All Time Top 1000 Albums, and in 2003, it was ranked number 48 on Rolling Stone magazine's list of the 500 greatest albums of all time, the highest ranking of all the hip hop albums on the list, and the only one acknowledged in the top 100. In the 2020 version of the same list, the album was ranked number 15, while other hip-hop albums moved into the top 100.

== Background ==
Public Enemy's 1987 debut album Yo! Bum Rush the Show, while acclaimed by hip hop critics and aficionados, had gone ignored for the most part by the rock and R&B mainstream, selling only 300,000 copies, which was relatively low by the high-selling standards of other Def Jam recording artists such as LL Cool J and Beastie Boys at the time. However, the group continued to tour and record tirelessly. "On the day that Yo! Bum Rush the Show was released [in the spring of 1987], we was already in the trenches recording Nation of Millions," stated lead MC Chuck D.

With It Takes a Nation of Millions to Hold Us Back, the group set out to make what they considered to be the hip hop equivalent to Marvin Gaye's What's Going On, an album noted for its strong social commentary. As said by Chuck, "our mission was to kill the 'Cold Gettin' Dumb' stuff and really address some situations." In order to ensure that their live shows would be as exciting as those they played in London and Philadelphia, the group decided that the music on Nation of Millions would have to be faster than that found on Yo! Bum Rush the Show. "Years of saved-up ideas," noted Chuck, "were compiled into one focused aural missile."

== Recording ==
It wasn't that we took records and rapped over them, we actually had an intricate way of developing sound, arranging the sound. We had musicians like Eric Sadler... Hank Shocklee, the Phil Spector of hip hop. You've got to give the credit as it's due, if Phil Spector has the Wall of Sound Hank Shocklee has the Wall of Noise.

— Chuck D, The Quietus, 2008

Public Enemy began making the album at Chung King Studios in Manhattan but ran into conflicts with engineers prejudiced against hip hop acts. The group resumed recording at Greene St. Recording where they were more comfortable. Initially, the engineers at Greene Street were also apprehensive about the group but eventually grew to respect their work ethic and seriousness about the recording process. Recorded under the working title Countdown to Armageddon, the group ultimately decided on It Takes a Nation of Millions to Hold Us Back instead, a line from their first album's song "Raise the Roof". The material was recorded in 30 days for an estimated $25,000 in recording costs, due to an extensive amount of preproduction by the group at their Long Island studio. The album was completed in six weeks. "It was aggressive, race-against-the-clock teamwork, taking chances in sound," recalled Chuck D.

Rather than touring with the rest of the group, Eric "Vietnam" Sadler and Hank Shocklee would stay in the studio and work on material for the Nation of Millions album, so that the music was ready when Chuck D and Flavor Flav returned from tour. When the group began planning the second album, the songs "Bring the Noise", "Don't Believe the Hype", and "Rebel Without a Pause" had already been completed. The latter track was recorded during the group's 1987 Def Jam tour, and the lyrics were written by Chuck D in one day spent secluded at his home. Instead of looping the break from James Brown's "Funky Drummer", a commonly used breakbeat in hip hop, "Rebel Without a Pause" had Flavor Flav play the beat on the drum machine continuously for the track's duration of five minutes and two seconds. Chuck D later said of his contribution to the track, "Flavor's timing helped create almost like a band rhythm". Terminator X, the group's DJ/turntablist, also incorporated a significant element to the track, the renowned transformer scratch, towards its end. Named for its similarity to the sound made by the Autobots in The Transformers, the scratch was developed by DJ Spinbad and popularized by DJ Jazzy Jeff and Cash Money, and Terminator X had honed his take on the scratch on tour. The group was satisfied with its sound after having removed the bass from his section of the track.

According to Chuck D, Hank Shocklee made the last call when songs were completed. "Hank would come up with the final mix because he was the sound master... Hank is the Phil Spector of hip-hop. He was way ahead of his time, because he dared to challenge the odds in sound." This was also one of the details which Chuck felt to be unique to the time and recording of the album. "Once hip-hop became corporate, they took the daredevil out of the artistry. But being a daredevil was what Hank brought to the table." It was decided amongst the group that the album should be exactly one hour long, thirty minutes on each side. At the time, audio cassettes were more popular than CDs and the group did not want listeners having to hear dead air for a long time after one-half of the album was finished. The two sides of the album were originally the other way around, the album beginning with "Show Em Whatcha Got" which leads into "She Watch Channel Zero?!". This instead became the start of side two or the "Black Side". Hank Shocklee decided to flip the sides just before the mastering of the album and start the record with Dave Pearce introducing the group during their first tour of England.

== Music and lyrics ==
Under Hank Shocklee's direction, the Bomb Squad, the group's production team, began to develop a dense and chaotic production style that relied on found sounds and avant-garde noise as much as it did on old-school funk. Along with a varied selection of sampled elements, the tracks feature a greater tempo than those of the group's contemporaries. Music critic Robert Christgau noted these elements and wrote that the Bomb Squad "juice post-Coleman/Coltrane ear-wrench with the kind of furious momentum harmolodic funk has never dared: the shit never stops abrading and exploding". As with the group's live performances, Flavor Flav supported Chuck D's politically charged lyrics with "hype man" vocals and surrealistic lyrics on the album.

On the album's content, music journalist Peter Shapiro wrote "Droning feedback, occasional shards of rock guitar, and James Brown horn samples distorted into discordant shrieks back the political rhetoric of lead rapper Chuck D and the surreality of Flavor Flav". Ethnomathematics author Ron Eglash interpreted the album's style and production to be "massively interconnected political and sonic content", writing that "[the Bomb Squad] navigated the ambiguity between the philosophies of sound and voice. Public Enemy's sound demonstrated an integration of lyrical content, vocal tone, sample density and layering, scratch deconstruction, and sheer velocity that rap music has never been able to recapture, and that hip-hop DJs and producers are still mining for gems".

We took whatever was annoying, threw it into a pot, and that's how we came out with this group. We believed that music is nothing but organized noise. You can take anything—street sounds, us talking, whatever you want—and make it music by organizing it. That's still our philosophy, to show people that this thing you call music is a lot broader than you think it is.

— Hank Shocklee, Keyboard Magazine, 1990

In an interview with the New York Daily News, Shocklee noted that the album's dynamic sound was inspired by Chuck D's rapping prowess, stating "Chuck's a powerful rapper. We wanted to make something that could sonically stand up to him". Of his own contributions to its production, Shocklee cited himself as being the arranger and noted that he had "no interest in linear songs". When using records for sampling, Shocklee stated that he'd sometimes put them on the ground and stomp on them if they sounded too "clean."

Hank referred to Chuck D as being the person who would find all the vocal samples, Eric Sadler as "the one with the musical talent," and noted that his brother, Keith Shocklee, "knew a lot of the breakbeats and was the sound-effects master." Shocklee's sentiments were reinforced by Chuck D while explaining the group's working methods during production. "Eric was the musician, Hank was the antimusician. Eric did a lot of the [drum] programming, [Hank's brother] Keith was the guy who would bring in the feel." For his contributions to the production side, Chuck stated that he "would scour for vocal samples all over the Earth. I would name a song, tag it, and get the vocal samples." Chuck D also noted the productiveness of Sadler and Shocklee's differing approaches to the creative process. "The friction between Hank and Eric worked very well. Hank would put a twist on Eric's musicianship and Eric's musicianship would put a twist on Hank."

Some production mistakes were kept for the album. The breakdown in "Bring the Noise" in which the kick-drum sample from James Brown's "Funky Drummer" plays solo was a mistake. Apparently, the wrong sequence came up in the SP1200 sampler and Shocklee decided not only to keep it but to have Chuck rewrite his rhyme to fit the pattern. The album itself was mixed with no automation, instead being recorded on analog tape and later painstakingly mixed by hand. This is a significant fact due to its nature as being one of the most intricate albums of digitally sampled music. Asked years later if replicating the number of samples used on the album would be possible (due to increased clearance costs for copyrighted material), Hank Shocklee said while possible, it would be far more expensive.

== Songs ==
"Rebel Without a Pause"
The track features aggressive rapping by Chuck D and exemplifies the album's sample-heavy production.

Throughout the album, Chuck D delivers narratives that are characterized by black nationalist rhetoric and regard topics such as self-empowerment for African Americans, critiques of white supremacy, and challenges to exploitation in the music industry. "Caught, Can We Get a Witness?" directly addresses the issue of sampling in hip hop and copyright violation from a perspective that supports the practice and claims entitlement due to "black ownership of the sounds in the first place".

"Rebel Without a Pause" exemplifies the faster tempo that Public Enemy intended for the album, while incorporating a heavy beat and samples of screeching horns, the latter taken from the J.B.'s' "The Grunt" (1970). According to Ron Eglash, such effects of sampling exemplify the "sense of urgency" given to the messages of the album's tracks, "to heighten the tension of the mix", while Chuck D's message is "one of total resistance that was readily accessible through [...] the confrontational sounds of bass, groove, and noise." Lyrically, it eschews the traditional verse/chorus—verse/chorus song structure, with 12 bars of Chuck D's aggressive rapping, punctuated by Flavor Flav's stream of consciousness ad-libs. Public Enemy-biographer Russell Myrie writes of the track's significance, "It matched 'I Know You Got Soul' in terms of its innovation and its breathtaking quality. It increased the tempo for Public Enemy, something they would do repeatedly during their forthcoming masterpiece [...] The faster tempo was important as it would heighten energy levels at their shows. Most important of all, it sounded fresh. It was some next level hip-hop. Chuck and Hank rightly felt it could stand alongside the best rap records of the time."

Some of the song titles make reference to other works from popular culture. The title of the song "Party for Your Right to Fight" is a rearrangement of the Beastie Boys' 1987 hit single "(You Gotta) Fight for Your Right (To Party!)." The vocal sample of hip hop DJ Mr. Magic stating that his show would play "no more music by the suckers" was used on the song "Cold Lampin' with Flavor" after having been recorded from Magic's radio show by Flavor Flav. Magic had dissed the group with the line when he mistakenly embroiled them in the WBAU-WBLS radio war.

Chuck D has said that "Party for Your Right to Fight", the album's closing track, is dedicated to the Black Panther Party.

== Release and reception ==
The album was released on June 28, 1988 and in its first month of release, It Takes a Nation of Millions to Hold Us Back sold 500,000 copies without significant promotional efforts by its distributing label Columbia Records. It peaked at number 42 on the U.S. Billboard Top Pop Albums chart and at number one on the Top Black Albums chart. It spent 49 weeks on the Billboard Top Pop Albums. On August 22, 1989, it was certified platinum by the Recording Industry Association of America (RIAA), for shipments of at least one million copies in the United States. Since 1991, when the tracking system Nielsen SoundScan began tracking domestic sales data, the album has sold 722,000 additional copies as of 2010.

It Takes a Nation of Millions to Hold Us Back received positive reviews from contemporary critics. In his review for Rolling Stone, David Fricke described the album as a "Molotov cocktail of nuclear scratching, gnarly minimalist electronics and revolution rhyme" and complimented its "abrupt sequencing and violent sonic compression of rapid-fire samples, slamming-jail-door percussion, DJ Terminator X's tornado turntable work and Chuck D's outraged oratory". Los Angeles Times writer Robert Hilburn said that the album incorporates some of the dynamics of early rap records such as Grandmaster Flash and the Furious Five's "The Message" (1982) and Run–D.M.C.'s "Sucker M.C.'s" (1983) with the "radical, socially conscious tradition of groups like the Last Poets". Hilburn commended Chuck D for his rapping on It Takes a Nation of Millions to Hold Us Back, writing that he "isn't afraid of being labeled an extremist, and it's that fearless bite—or game plan—that helps infuse his black-consciousness raps with the anger and assault of punk pioneers like the Sex Pistols and Clash". Writing for NME, critic James Brown said that "Nation of Millions... is impressive because it moves, it uses and it's a music—not the acetate-thin barrage of whingeing and boasting that so often passes for rap", while in Q, David Sinclair called it "an unimaginably urgent album seething with vengeful rage and booby trapped with incendiary musical devices". Jon Pareles of The New York Times praised the album for its production and compared its symbolic value to hip hop music at the time, stating:

Where most rappers present themselves as funky individualists, beating the odds of the status quo, Public Enemy suggests that rap listeners can become an active community, not just an audience. Although it overreaches, It Takes a Nation jams urban tension and black anger into the foreground; it reveals the potential for demagoguery as well as the need for change. 'Whatcha gonna do/ rappers not afraid of you', Public Enemy demands, and in 1988 it sounds like something more than idle entertainment.

Despite writing that it "sounds powerful, fresh and galvanizing", Mark Jenkins of The Washington Post found its lyrical content inconsistent, stating "Aurally, 'Nation of Millions' is intoxicating; Hank Shocklee and Carl Ryder's bold production will likely prove among the most distinctive of the year, not just in rap but in any pop genre. For their work to pack the political wallop they crave, however, the members of Public Enemy need to think for themselves, not just attach themselves to the thought of whichever black nationalist is currently drawing big crowds". The Los Angeles Daily News gave the album a "B" and compared its musical "rage" to that of rapper Schoolly D's Smoke Some Kill (1988).

In its year-end list of 1988's best albums, Q called It Takes a Nation "a blistering collage of beat box [sic], rock guitar, police-radio chatter and high-velocity rapping." It was voted number one in The Village Voice's annual Pazz & Jop critics' poll, as well as number three on poll creator Robert Christgau's list. In an article for the newspaper, Christgau called it "the bravest and most righteous experimental pop of the decade—no matter how the music looks written down (ha ha), Hank Shocklee and Terminator X have translated Blood Ulmer's harmolodic visions into a street fact that's no less edutaining (if different) in the dwellings of monkey spawn and brothers alike (and different)".

== Legacy and influence ==
Retrospective professional ratings
Review scores
Source	Rating
AllMusic	5/5 stars
Christgau's Record Guide	A+
The Guardian	5/5 stars
NME	10/10
Pitchfork	10/10
Q	5/5 stars
The Rolling Stone Album Guide	5/5 stars
Select	5/5
The Source	5/5 stars
Spin Alternative Record Guide	10/10

It Takes a Nation of Millions to Hold Us Back has been cited by critics and publications as one of the greatest and most influential recordings of all time. Upon the album's remastered reissue in 1995, Q hailed it "the greatest rap album of all time, a landmark and classic". Melody Maker called the album "bloody essential", commenting, "I hadn't believed it could get harder [than Yo! Bum Rush the Show]. Or better." NME dubbed it "the greatest hip-hop album ever" at the time, stating "this wasn't merely a sonic triumph. This was also where Chuck wrote a fistful of lyrics that promoted him to the position of foremost commentator/documentor of life in the underbelly of the USA".

Readers of Hip Hop Connection voted it the best album of all-time, prompting the magazine to comment, "Even 'Rebel Without a Pause', a definite contender for best rap single ever released, failed to put the other 12 [sic] tracks to shame, such was the high standard throughout." HHC readers again voted it the best of all-time in 2000, as did Flavor Flav in his accompanying top ten. "This is really hard," he said, "because I'm in love with every piece of work that's ever been recorded. I would never say someone else's project is better than anyone else's."

Mojo stated upon the album's 2000 European reissue, "Responsible for the angriest polemic since The Last Poets....[they] revolutionized the music, using up to 80 backing tracks in the sonic assault....to these ears PE sound like the greatest rock'n'roll band in history". In 2003, Rolling Stone ranked the album number 48 on its list of the 500 Greatest Albums of All Time, making it the highest-ranked of the 27 hip hop albums included on the list, maintaining the rating in a 2012 revised list. Time magazine hailed it as one of the 100 greatest albums of all time in 2006. Kurt Cobain, the lead guitarist and singer of rock band Nirvana, listed the album as one of his top 50 favorite albums in his Journals. In 2006, Q placed the album at number seven on its list of "40 Best Albums of the '80s". In 2012, Slant Magazine listed the album at #3 on its list of "Best Albums of the 1980s" behind Michael Jackson's Thriller and Prince and the Revolution's Purple Rain. The album ranks Number 2 on the list of best records of the 20th century of German music magazine Spex.

In his 2004 book Appropriating Technology: Vernacular Science and Social Power, Ron Eglash commented that a sonically and politically charged album such as Nation "can be considered a monument to the synthesis of sound and politics". In 2005, New York University's Clive Davis Department of Recorded Music hosted a two-day retrospective called "The Making of It Takes a Nation of Millions." It featured a producers' panel that reunited Hank Shocklee, captain of the Bomb Squad, with the Chairmen of the Boards from Greene St. Recording. When asked in 2008 if the album would still be considered as radical if it were released two decades later, Chuck D said he felt it would "simply because it's faster than anything on the radio right now. And yeah, it's radical politically... because it's not really being said a lot. You want it to not be radical, but it is because it's totally different from Soulja Boy." American rapper Ice Cube said in 2005 that the album "messes with your brain even to this day." The album's revolutionary attitudes also influenced musician and activist Kathleen Hanna of the seminal riot grrrl band Bikini Kill. She described it as her go-to album while touring, stating: "I was like, 'Man, some of these rappers are bragging and boasting, and I wanna brag and boast!' Like, why do I feel like I have to try to write the song I'm supposed to write, and not the song I wanna write?"

"The title alone was incredible to me. The artwork was amazing. As a body of work, it just blew me away…. I saw what that album did to the world. It helped bring me closer to understanding what's required to be an artist of that calibre." – Busta Rhymes

Public Enemy performed the album in its entirety as part of the All Tomorrow's Parties-curated Don't Look Back series. "I didn't think it would work," Chuck D admitted of the full-length performance. "But it ended up being something that worked tremendously well. Now we have a problem to get away from it. It amazed me that a lot of people who have gravitated to the album weren't even born when it was recorded. But it's YouTube and iLike and MySpace and file sharing which highlighted the existence of it. So I can't shoot down file sharing, as it's benefited us tremendously."

Music from the album has been sampled over the years, including (though not limited to) the Beastie Boys ("Egg Man"), Game ("Remedy"), The album is broken down track-by-track by Chuck D in Brian Coleman's book Check the Technique.

=== Accolades ===
Publication	Country	Accolade	Year	Rank
About.com	US	100 Greatest Hip-Hop Albums	2008	2
About.com	US	10 Essential Hip-Hop Albums	2008	2
Blender	US	The 100 Greatest American Albums of All Time	2002	11
Blender	US	500 CDs You Must Own Before You Die	2003	*
Robert Christgau	US	Personal 10 Best Albums from the '80s	1990	8
Robert Dimery (General Editor)	—	1001 Albums You Must Hear Before You Die	2016	*
Ego Trip	US	Hip Hop's 25 Greatest Albums by Year 1980–1998	1999	1
Entertainment Weekly	US	The 100 Greatest CDs of All Time	1993	33
The Guardian	UK	The 100 Best Albums Ever	1997	20
Helsingin Sanomat	Finland	50th Anniversary of Rock	2004	*
Kitsap Sun	US	Top 200 Albums of the Last 40 Years	2005	53
Melody Maker	UK	Albums of the Year	1988	28
Mojo	UK	The 100 Greatest Albums Ever Made	1995	76
Tom Moon	US	1,000 Recordings to Hear Before You Die	2008	*
Paul Morley	UK	100 Greatest Albums of All Time	2003	*
Muzik	UK	The 50 Most Influential Records of All Time	1999	*
Muzik	UK	Top 50 Dance Albums of All Time	2002	19
New Musical Express	UK	40 Records That Captured the Moment 1952–1991	1992	*
New Musical Express	UK	Albums of the Year	1988	1
New Musical Express	UK	All Times Top 100 Albums + Top 50 by Decade	1993	9
Paste	US	The 300 Greatest Albums of all-time	2024	11
Pitchfork	US	Top 100 Favorite Records of the 1980s	2002	9
Rolling Stone	Germany	The 500 Best Albums of All Time	2004	345
Rolling Stone	US	The 500 Greatest Albums of All Time	2003	48
Rolling Stone	US	Albums of the Year	1988	3
Rolling Stone	US	The Essential 200 Rock Records	1997	*
The Source	US	The 100 Best Rap Albums of All Time	1998	*
Spin	US	Top 100 Alternative Albums	1995	2
Spin	US	100 Greatest Albums 1985–2005	2005	2
Time	US	The All-TIME 100 Albums	2006	*
Vibe	US	100 Essential Albums of the 20th Century	1999	*
Vibe	US	51 Essential Albums	2004	*
The Village Voice	US	Pazz & Jop	1988	1

== Track listing ==
All tracks produced by the Bomb Squad.

Side Silver
No.	Title	Writer(s)	Length
1.	"Countdown to Armageddon" (Intro)	Carlton "Chuck D" Ridenhour; Eric "Vietnam" Sadler; Hank Shocklee	1:40
2.	"Bring the Noise"	Ridenhour; Sadler; Shocklee	3:46
3.	"Don't Believe the Hype"	Ridenhour; Sadler; Shocklee; William "Flavor Flav" Drayton	5:19
4.	"Cold Lampin' with Flavor"	Sadler; Shocklee; Drayton	4:17
5.	"Terminator X to the Edge of Panic"	Ridenhour; Norman "Terminator X" Rogers; Drayton	4:31
6.	"Mind Terrorist" (Interlude)	Ridenhour; Sadler; Shocklee	1:21
7.	"Louder Than a Bomb"	Ridenhour; Sadler; Shocklee	3:37
8.	"Caught, Can We Get a Witness?"	Ridenhour; Sadler; Shocklee	4:53

Side Black
No.	Title	Writer(s)	Length
9.	"Show 'Em Whatcha Got" (Interlude)	Ridenhour; Sadler; Shocklee	1:56
10.	"She Watch Channel Zero?!"	Ridenhour; Sadler; Shocklee; Richard "Professor Griff" Griffin; Drayton	3:49
11.	"Night of the Living Baseheads"	Ridenhour; Sadler; Shocklee	3:14
12.	"Black Steel in the Hour of Chaos"	Ridenhour; Sadler; Shocklee; Drayton	6:23
13.	"Security of the First World" (Interlude)	Ridenhour; Sadler; Shocklee	1:20
14.	"Rebel Without a Pause"	Ridenhour; Sadler; Shocklee; Rogers	5:02
15.	"Prophets of Rage"	Ridenhour; Sadler; Shocklee; Drayton	3:18
16.	"Party for Your Right to Fight"	Ridenhour; Sadler; Shocklee	3:24

2014 deluxe edition bonus tracks
No.	Title	Length
1.	"Bring the Noise (No Noise Version)"	3:46
2.	"Bring the Noise (No Noise Instrumental)"	4:23
3.	"Bring the Noise (No Noise A Cappella)"	1:31
4.	"Rebel Without a Pause (Instrumental)"	4:23
5.	"Night of the Living Baseheads (Anti-High Blood Pressure Encounter Mix)"	5:01
6.	"Night of the Living Baseheads (Terminator X Meets DST and Chuck Chill Out Instrumental Mix)"	2:55
7.	"The Edge of Panic"	3:00
8.	"The Rhythm, the Rebel (A Capella)"	1:11
9.	"Prophets of Rage (Power Version)"	3:20
10.	"Caught, Can We Get a Witness? (Pre Black Steel Ballistic Felony Dub)"	5:05
11.	"B-Side Wins Again (Original Version)"	3:49
12.	"Black Steel in the Hour of Chaos (Instrumental)"	1:17
13.	"Fight the Power (Do the Right Thing Soundtrack Version)"	5:23

== Personnel ==
Personnel taken from It Takes a Nation of Millions to Hold Us Back liner notes.

Public Enemy

- Chuck D – vocals
- Flavor Flav – vocals
- Terminator X – turntables
- Professor Griff – vocals

Additional performers

- Johnny Juice Rosado – additional turntables on "Night of the Living Baseheads"

Production

- Rick Rubin – executive producer
- Hank Shocklee – producer, programming
- Carl Ryder – producer
- Eric "Vietnam" Sadler – assistant producer, programming
- Bill Stephney – production supervisor
- Nick Sansano – engineer
- Matt Tritto – engineer
- Chris Shaw – engineer
- John Harrison – engineer
- Jim Sabella – engineer
- Chuck Valle – engineer
- Jeff Jones – engineer
- Greg Gordon – engineer
- Rod Hui – mixing
- Steven Ett – mixing
- Chuck Chillout – mixing
- Keith Boxley – mixing
- Glen E. Friedman – photography

== Charts ==
Chart (1988)	Peak position
Netherlands (MegaCharts)	40
UK Albums Chart	8
US Billboard Top LPs	42
US Billboard Top Black Albums	1

== Certifications ==
Region	Certification	Certified units/sales
United Kingdom (BPI)	Gold	100,000^{*}
United States (RIAA)	Platinum	1,000,000^{^}
^{*} Sales figures based on certification alone.^{^} Shipments figures based on certification alone.

== See also ==
- Album era
- List of Billboard number-one R&B albums of 1988
