= Welcome to the Terrordome =

"Welcome To The Terrordome"

Single by Public Enemy

from the album Fear of a Black Planet
- Released: January 1990
- Recorded: 1989
- Studio: Greene St. Recording
- Genre: Hip-hop
- Length: 5:27
- Label: Def Jam, Columbia Records
- Songwriters: Chuck D, Hank Shocklee, Keith Shocklee

"Welcome to the Terrordome" is a song by the American hip hop band Public Enemy, recorded for their 1990 album Fear of a Black Planet. It was released as a single in January 1990, according to the discographer Martin C. Strong.

== Critical reception ==
In a retrospective review of the song for AllMusic, John Bush said that the song was "arguably the production peak of The Bomb Squad and one of Chuck D's best rapping performances ever", and stated that "none of [Public Enemy's] tracks were more musically incendiary than 'Welcome to the Terrordome'. British journalist Garry Mulholland included the song in his book This Is Uncool: The 500 Greatest Singles Since Punk and Disco, describing the song's music as being "based on a boiling, undulating bluesy shudder that isn't even recognizable as a riff" and the lyrics as "the best and most complex slew of metaphors and similes that Chuck ever wrote"

== Antisemitism controversy ==
The song was the subject of controversy since some felt that the lyrics were antisemitic.

== Charts ==
Chart (1990)	Peak position
Ireland (IRMA)	19
Netherlands (Single Top 100)	21
New Zealand (Recorded Music NZ)	12
UK Singles (Official Charts)	18
US Dance Club Songs (Billboard)	49
US Hot R&B/Hip-Hop Songs (Billboard)	15
US Hot Rap Songs (Billboard)	3
