= Yo! Bum Rush the Show =

Studio album by Public Enemy
- Released: March 1987
- Recorded: 1986
- Studios: Spectrum City Studios, Hempstead
- Genre: Hardcore hip-hop
- Length: 46:44
- Labels: Def Jam; Columbia
- Producers: Bill Stephney; The Bomb Squad

Public Enemy chronology
Yo! Bum Rush the Show (1987)	It Takes a Nation of Millions to Hold Us Back (1988)

Singles from Yo! Bum Rush the Show
- 1. "Public Enemy No. 1" Released: March 1987; 2. "You're Gonna Get Yours" Released: May 1987

Yo! Bum Rush the Show is the debut studio album by the American hip hop group Public Enemy. It was released in March 1987 through Def Jam Recordings. It was recorded at Spectrum City Studios in Hempstead, New York, and became one of the fastest-selling hip hop records, but was controversial among radio stations and critics, in part due to lead rapper Chuck D's black nationalist politics. The album is regarded as one of hip hop's greatest and most influential records. The album featured the Bomb Squad's sample-heavy production style and the scratching of DJ Terminator X.

== Musical style ==
Yo! Bum Rush the Show featured the Bomb Squad's sample-heavy production style, also prominent on the group's later work. Joe Brown of The Washington Post described the album's music as "a more serious brand of inner-city aggression", in comparison to Licensed to Ill (1986) by Def Jam label-mates the Beastie Boys. On its musical style, Brown wrote "Public Enemy's mean and minimalist rap is marked by an absolute absence of melody – the scary sound is just a throbbing pulse, hard drums and a designed-to-irritate electronic whine, like a dentist's drill or a persistent mosquito". The album's sound is accented by the scratching of DJ Terminator X. Chicago Tribune writer Daniel Brogan described Public Enemy's style on the album as "raw and confrontational", writing that the group "doesn't aim to – or have a chance at – crossing over".

== Title and packaging ==
According to music journalist Jeff Chang, Public Enemy embodied the "bumrush aesthetic" of underground black radicalism and used their debut album's cover to illustrate a resurgence in the spirit of militancy. The cover features the group in a poorly lit basement, "readying themselves to bring black militancy back into the high noon of the Reagan day", as Chang described and compared to the 1987 Boogie Down Productions album Criminal Minded that followed. Chuck D is shown dressed in white Islamic clothing, Professor Griff is on the far right wearing a red beret, and Flavor Flav has his hand reaching out over a turntable, which Chang interpreted as him blessing the vinyl record. A second black hand is shown reaching at the play button to "begin the revolution", in Chang's words. A line of repeated text is printed at the bottom of the photo, described by Chang as a punchline, and reading: "THE GOVERNMENT'S RESPONSIBLE . . . THE GOVERNMENT'S RESPONSIBLE . . . THE GOVERNMENT'S RESPONSIBLE . . ." The cover marked the first appearance of Public Enemy's logo, a silhouette of a black man in a rifle's crosshairs.

== Release and promotion ==
Yo! Bum Rush the Show was released in March 1987 through Def Jam Recordings and Columbia Records. It was promoted with the release of two singles that year: "Public Enemy No. 1" in March and "You're Gonna Get Yours" in May.

The album was largely ignored by radio programmers, including most African-American radio stations. On record charts, it reached the 125th position of the Billboard Top LPs and number 28 on the Top Black Albums in the United States. Jon Pareles reported in May 1987, however, that it had become one of hip hop's fastest selling records. By the following year, it had sold more than 300,000 copies in the US, and 400,000 by 1989. On October 3, 1994, the album was certified Gold by the Recording Industry Association of America, indicating 500,000 units moved.

== Critical reception ==
Retrospective professional reviews
Review scores
Source	Rating
AllMusic	4.5/5 stars
Christgau's Record Guide	B+
The Encyclopedia of Popular Music	4/5 stars
The Guardian	4/5 stars
NME	9/10
Q	4/5 stars
The Rolling Stone Album Guide	4.5/5 stars
Spin Alternative Record Guide	7/10
Tom Hull	A−

According to Robert Hilburn in 1988, Yo! Bum Rush the Show was widely acclaimed by critics. The journalist Christopher R. Weingarten later recalled American critics were originally lukewarm to the album. In Chang's estimation, white journalists in particular strongly criticized Chuck D's pro-black nationalist sentiments.

In a review published in The Village Voice under the title "Noise Annoys", John Leland avoided the group's politics entirely and simply found Chuck D boring, instead preferring the more entertaining rhymes of Flavor Flav. Fellow Village Voice critic Robert Christgau said the group has "literary chops—amid puns more Elvis Costello than Peter Tosh, their 'Megablast' is cutting anticrack narrative-propaganda--and they make something personal of rap's ranking minimalist groove." He found them lacking in levity, however, and complained that "Chuck D takes the bully-boy orotundity of his school of rap elocution into a realm of vocal self-involvement worthy of Pavarotti, Steve Perry, or the preacher at a Richard Pryor funeral." Pareles was more enthusiastic in The New York Times, hailing Yo! Bum Rush the Show as rap's "grittiest" full-length record. While still finding Public Enemy plagued by the "adolescent macho" he deemed prevalent in the genre, he said its songs are "far more convincing - and unsettling - when [Chuck] D takes on money and power", and concluded: "At a time when most rappers typecast themselves as comedy acts or party bands, Public Enemy's best moments promise something far more dangerous and subversive: realism."

According to Chang, the album fared better among critics in the United Kingdom, where music publications ranked it as one of the year's best records. In NME magazine's critics poll, it was named the best album of 1987. The single "You're Gonna Get Yours" was also listed at number 25 on their list of Top 50 tracks of the year. It was also voted the 14th best album of the year in The Village Voice's Pazz & Jop, an annual poll of American critics nationwide.

In subsequent years, Yo! Bum Rush the Show has been considered a classic and one of hip hop's most influential records. In 1998, it was selected as one of The Source's 100 Best Rap Albums. In 2003, Rolling Stone ranked it number 497 on a list of the 500 greatest albums of all time, although the album was removed in the 2012 version of the list.

== Track listing ==
E Side
No.	Title	Writer(s)	Length
1.	"You're Gonna Get Yours"	Carlton "Chuck D" Ridenhour; Hank Shocklee	4:04
2.	"Sophisticated Bitch"	Ridenhour; William "Flavor Flav" Drayton; Shocklee	4:30
3.	"Miuzi Weighs a Ton"	Ridenhour; Shocklee	5:44
4.	"Timebomb"	Ridenhour; Shocklee	2:54
5.	"Too Much Posse"	Ridenhour; Drayton; Shocklee	2:25
6.	"Rightstarter (Message to a Black Man)"	Ridenhour; Shocklee	3:48

F Side
No.	Title	Writer(s)	Length
7.	"Public Enemy No. 1"	Ridenhour; Shocklee	4:41
8.	"M.P.E."	Ridenhour; Drayton; Shocklee	3:43
9.	"Yo! Bum Rush the Show"	Ridenhour; Drayton; Shocklee	4:25
10.	"Raise the Roof"	Ridenhour; Eric "Vietnam" Sadler; Shocklee	5:18
11.	"Megablast"	Ridenhour; Drayton; Shocklee	2:51
12.	"Terminator X Speaks with His Hands"	Ridenhour; Drayton; Sadler; Shocklee	2:13
Total length:			46:44

== Personnel ==
- Chuck D – vocals, co-producer
- Flavor Flav – vocals
- Terminator X – lead scratch
- Hank Shocklee – co-producer, mixing, drum programming, synth programming
- Eric Sadler – co-producer, mixing, drum programming, synth programming
- Stephen Linsley – bass, recording & mixing
- Bill Stephney – bass, guitars, co-producer, mixing
- Vernon Reid – guitars
- Johnny "Juice" Rosado – rhythm scratch
- Rick Rubin – executive producer, mixing
- Glen E. Friedman – photography
- Steve Ett – mixing

== Charts ==
=== Weekly charts ===
Chart (1987–1988)	Peak position
US Billboard 200	125
US Top R&B/Hip-Hop Albums (Billboard)	28

Chart (2024–2025)	Peak position
Greek Albums (IFPI)	18
UK R&B Albums (Official Charts)	20

=== Year-end charts ===
Chart (1988)	Position
US Top R&B/Hip-Hop Albums (Billboard)	94

== Certifications ==
Region	Certification	Certified units/sales
United States (RIAA)	Gold	500,000^{^}
^{^} Shipments figures based on certification alone.

== See also ==
- Album era

== Bibliography ==
- Chang, Jeff (2005). Can't Stop Won't Stop: A History of the Hip-Hop Generation. Macmillan. ISBN 031230143X.
- Nathan Brackett, Christian Hoard (2004). The New Rolling Stone Album Guide. Completely Revised and Updated 4th Edition. Simon and Schuster. ISBN 0-7432-0169-8.
- Rausch, Andrew J. (2011). I Am Hip-Hop: Conversations on the Music and Culture. Scarecrow Press. ISBN 0810877929.
- Strong, Martin Charles (October 21, 2004). The Great Rock Discography (7th ed.). Canongate U.S. ISBN 1-84195-615-5.
- Weingarten, Christopher R. (2010). Public Enemy's It Takes a Nation of Millions to Hold Us Back. 33⅓. Vol. 71. A&C Black. ISBN 0826429130.
