= Flavor Flav =

American rapper (born 1959)

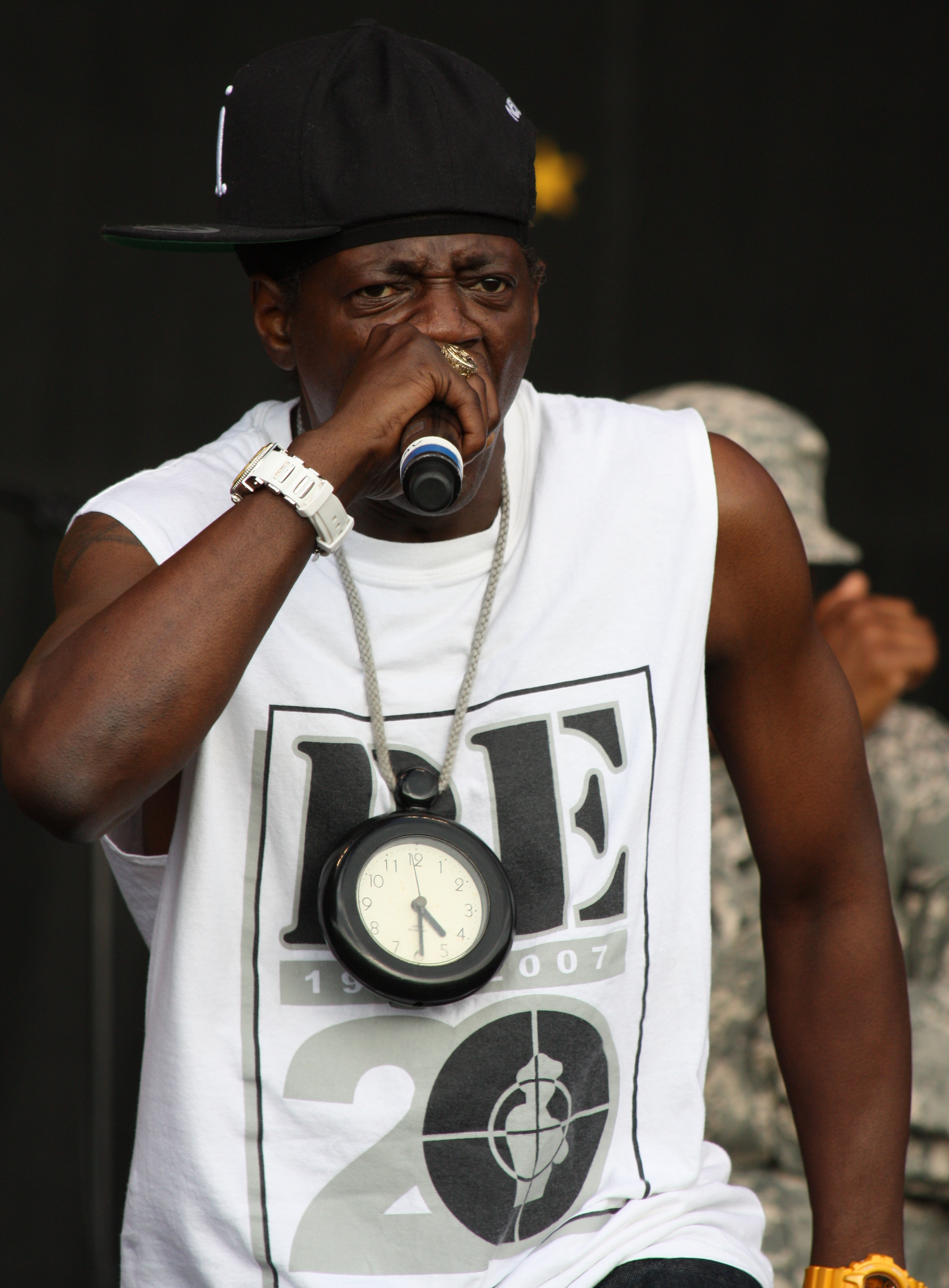
- Flav performing at New Orleans Jazz Fest in 2014

Background information
- Born: William Jonathan Drayton Jr. March 16, 1959 (age 67); Roosevelt, New York, U.S.
- Genre: East Coast hip-hop
- Occupations: Rapper; songwriter; hype man; television personality
- Years active: 1985–present
- Member of: Public Enemy

William Jonathan Drayton Jr. (born March 16, 1959), better known by his stage name Flavor Flav (Note: The correct spelling is Flavor, and he dislikes being referred to as Flava.) (/ˈfleɪvər ˌfleɪv/ FLAY-vər FLAYV), is an American rapper, hype man, and television personality. Known for his catchphrase "Yeah, boyeee!" when performing, he is a founding member, alongside Chuck D, of Public Enemy, a rap group that has earned six Grammy Award nominations. He has been inducted into the Rock and Roll Hall of Fame.

After spending several years out of the limelight, Flav starred in multiple VH1 reality series, including The Surreal Life, Strange Love, and Flavor of Love.

== Early life and education ==
Drayton was born in Roosevelt, New York and grew up in nearby Freeport, two communities within the Town of Hempstead. His father, William Drayton Sr., ran a restaurant, The Soul Diner in Freeport.

Drayton Jr. is the cousin of former Penn State basketball player Shep Garner, and of Brooklyn MC Timbo King of Royal Fam. He is also a cousin of rappers Ol' Dirty Bastard, RZA, and GZA of the Wu-Tang Clan. Drayton began teaching himself piano at the age of five. He was an accomplished musician playing piano, drums, and guitar at an early age while singing in the youth choir at his church. According to Chuck D, Drayton is proficient in playing fifteen instruments.

By the time he dropped out of Freeport High School in the 11th grade, he had been in and out of jail for robbery and burglary. He attended culinary school in 1978. Later, he went to Adelphi University in Garden City, New York, where he met Carlton Ridenhour (who later became known as Chuck D). They first collaborated on Chuck D's hip-hop college radio show, then began rapping together. Drayton's stage name Flavor Flav was originally his graffiti tag.

== Career ==
=== Music ===
Flavor Flav came to prominence as a founding member and hype man of the rap group Public Enemy, which he co-founded in 1985 with Chuck D. A year later, the group released "Public Enemy #1", which brought them to the attention of Def Jam Records executive Rick Rubin. Rubin initially did not understand Flav's role in the act and wanted to sign Chuck D as a solo act; however, Chuck D insisted that Flav be signed with them and the two were signed to Def Jam.

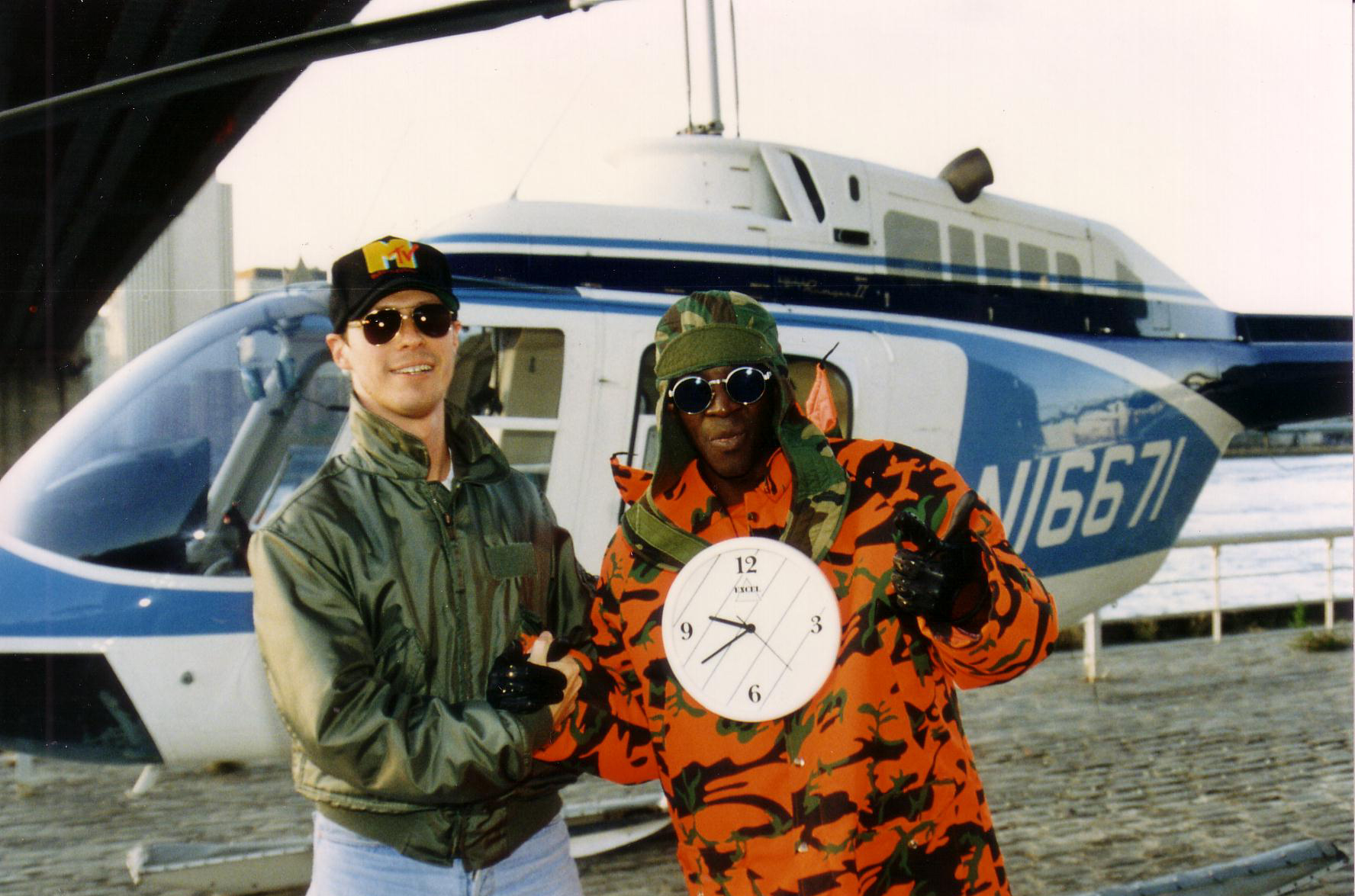
Flavor Flav and helicopter pilot Ray McCort on an MTV shoot in New York City, September 2016

The group's first album Yo! Bum Rush the Show was released in 1987. Flav served as the comic foil to Chuck D's serious, politically charged style. The group gained much wider fame with 1988's It Takes a Nation of Millions to Hold Us Back, which went double platinum. By the time the political single "Fight the Power" was released in 1989, the group had become mainstream superstars. Along with Chuck D, the showman of the group and its promotional voice, Flav stood out among the members of Public Enemy as he often excited fans appearing on stage and in public wearing large hats, glasses, and a sizable clock dangling from his neck.

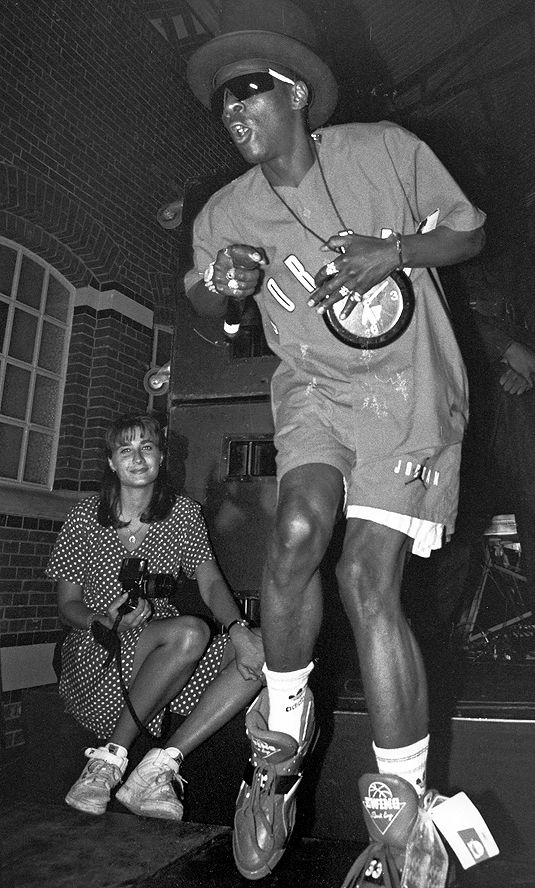
Flav performing at "The Slaughterhouse" in Malmö, Sweden, 1991

The first released track on which Flav rapped solo was "Life of a Nigerian" on Goat Ju JU, although the first hit on which he rapped solo would not come until the 1990 single "911 Is a Joke". During Public Enemy's first years of existence, Flav experienced tensions with group-mate Professor Griff, who never liked Flav's flamboyant stance in what Griff felt should be a serious, politically-challenging group. In 1999, Flavor Flav recorded with DJ Tomekk and Grandmaster Flash the single "1, 2, 3, ... Rhymes Galore". The single stayed for 17 weeks in the top ten of the German charts.

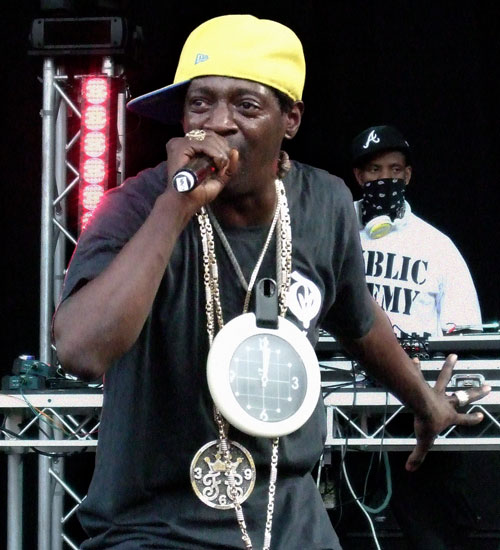
Flav performing at Riverstage in Brisbane, Australia, January 2009

In 2006, Flav put out his first solo album, titled Hollywood. It was released during the second season of the reality TV dating show Flavor of Love. On March 1, 2020, Public Enemy released a statement saying that the group would be "moving forward without Flavor Flav," after a disagreement of the group's decision to endorse Bernie Sanders and perform at his Los Angeles rally. Flav denounced the firing, maintaining that he was Chuck D's partner in Public Enemy and could not be fired from it. On April 1, 2020, Chuck D announced that the firing was a hoax. Flav said shortly thereafter that he was not a part of the hoax and disapproved of the stunt.

=== Television ===
After a hiatus from the music scene, Flav was invited to participate on VH1 reality show The Surreal Life. During this show, he developed a relationship with actress and singer Brigitte Nielsen. After the conclusion of The Surreal Life, VH1 gave Flav and Nielsen a show titled Strange Love, which detailed their globetrotting adventure in love. At the end of Strange Love, Nielsen decided to return to her fiancé, Mattia Dessi.

Flavor of Love aired for three seasons. It is a reality show where Flav looks for love and the show's success led to spin-offs titled I Love New York and I Love Money. During the third season reunion of Flavor of Love, Flav proposed to Liz, the mother of his youngest son, Karma. The Comedy Central roast of Flavor Flav aired on August 12, 2007. Guests appearing at the roast included Snoop Dogg, Brigitte Nielsen, Jimmy Kimmel, Carrot Top, Lisa Lampanelli, Ice-T, Jeff Ross, Katt Williams, Patton Oswalt, Greg Giraldo, and Sommore. Flav played Calvester Hill on the MyNetworkTV comedy series Under One Roof, starring alongside Kelly Perine.

=== Restaurant owner ===
In 2011, Flav partnered with Nick Cimino to open Flav's Fried Chicken in Cimino's hometown of Clinton, Iowa, northeast of Davenport. The two had met through Cimino's brother Peter, who runs Mama Cimino's in Las Vegas and Castle Rock Bar and Pizzeria in Kingman, Arizona, west of Flagstaff. After enjoying his homemade fried chicken, Peter Cimino began selling chicken wings using Flav's recipe. They hoped to start a national restaurant franchise. A mix of squabbling owners, bounced checks, and bad business decisions led to Flav's Chicken shutting down barely four months after it opened. Flav was not involved in the restaurant's day-to-day operations; Nick Cimino simply paid for Flavor Flav's license.

Flavor Flav's House of Flavor in Las Vegas opened on his birthday in March 2012. Flav teamed up with Gino Harmon and Salvatore Bitonti to start a national franchise known as Flavor Flav's Chicken & Ribs, which opened December 21, 2012 in Sterling Heights, Michigan, north of Detroit. The business was not affiliated with the previous two ventures Flav had in the restaurant business. Flavor Flav's Chicken & Ribs was a casual dining experience with a quick serve attitude. Flavor Flav's Chicken & Ribs closed in July 2013 after being evicted by its landlord for failure to pay rent.

=== Other TV and media appearances ===
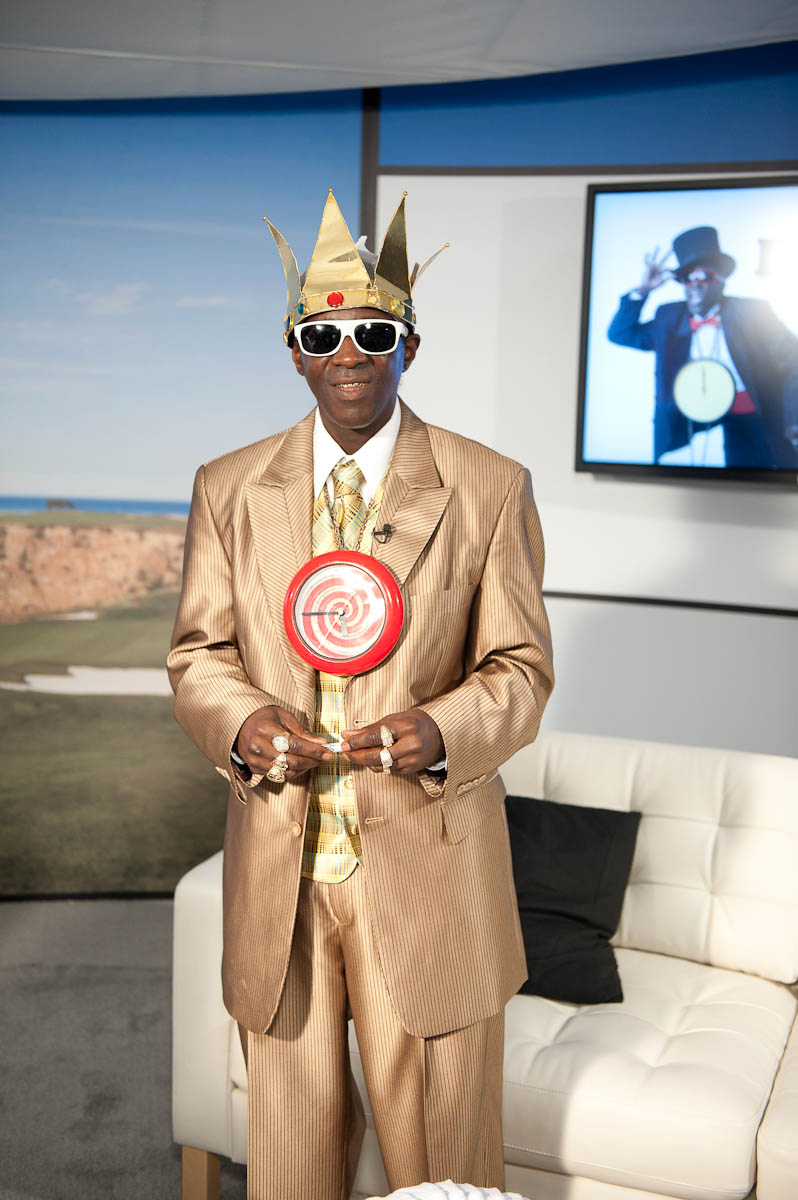
Flav at the PGA Merchandise Show in Orlando, Florida, January 2012

In 2002, Flav appeared in Taking Back Sunday's music video for their song You're So Last Summer. He has appeared as a playable fighter in the 2004 fighting game: Def Jam: Fight for NY. In May 2005, Flav took part in the British reality TV show The Farm on Channel 5. Also in 2005, he made a guest appearance in the MTV2 surreal black comedy show Wonder Showzen as himself, in the debut episode "Birth". On June 14, 2006, Flav's participation with WEVR-MRC in the Lisa Tolliver Show celebration of National Safety Month, earned kudos from U.S. Surgeon General Richard Carmona.

On November 18, 2009, Flav became a downloadable character in the PlayStation Network's video game Pain. He stars in Deon Taylor's horror anthology Nite Tales and Dark Christmas. On May 10, 2010, Flav guest hosted the wrestling show WWE Raw. On August 14, 2011, he appeared as a host at the twelfth annual Gathering of the Juggalos.

On January 10, 2012, Flav appeared with his longtime fiancée Liz on ABC's Celebrity Wife Swap. His fiancée traded places with Suzette, the wife of Twisted Sister front-man Dee Snider. On February 5, 2012, Flav appeared along with Elton John in a Pepsi ad during Super Bowl XLVI. On February 11, 2012, he celebrated the UNLV Rebel's 65-63 UNLV Runnin' Rebels victory over San Diego State as an honorary member. From June to September 2012, he co-starred and rapped in the web series Dr. Fubalous. Flav also appeared in YooHoo & Friends as Father Time, and the animated feature Hitpig!, both directed by animator David Feiss. In 2025, he competed in season thirteen of The Masked Singer as "Space Ranger" which resembles an alien cowboy, and was eliminated on "Ghostbusters Night".

=== Sports ===
Flavor Flav sang a widely noted performance of the Star Spangled Banner at a Milwaukee Bucks home game against the Atlanta Hawks in 2023. His performance was confusing to some, but Flav described the performance as a bucket list item and a tribute to military veterans. He has been a philanthropist and helped Olympic athletes needing support, including signing a five-year sponsorship deal as the United States women's national water polo team's official hype man. He traveled to France to personally watch the team in the 2024 Summer Olympics.

Flav also made a custom bronze clock necklace for U.S. gymnast Jordan Chiles after her bronze medal was controversially rescinded at the Paris 2024 games. He helped raise money for the family of Paralympic sprinter Nick Mayhugh to travel to Paris to see their relative play, and paid rent for Veronica Fraley, an Olympic discus thrower during the Olympic games.

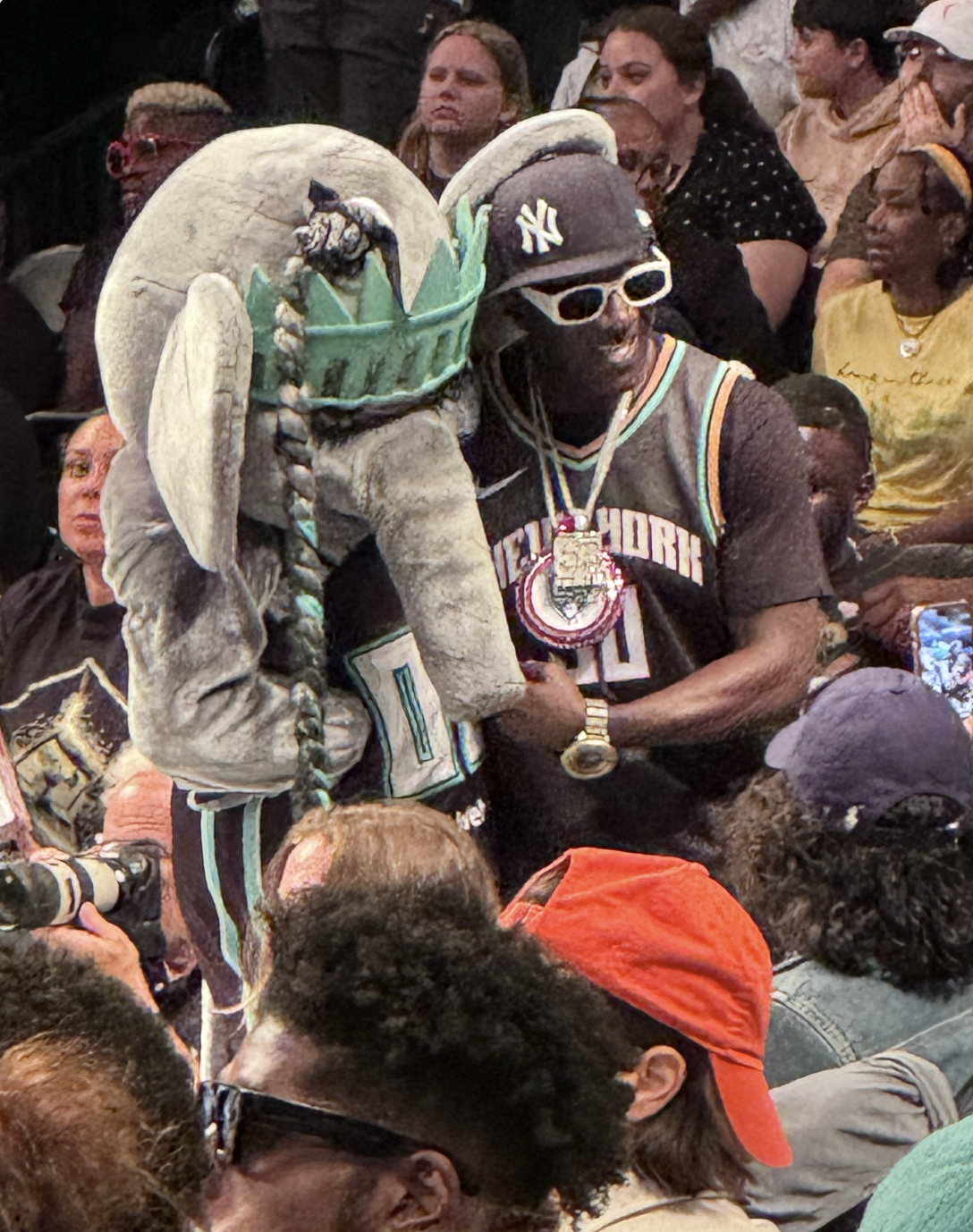
Flav with WNBA New York Liberty mascot Ellie The Elephant, September 2024

Flav is a long time fan of women's sports, and has been a notable guest at WNBA games, including performing a call and response tribute to the late Fatman Scoop at a New York Liberty game in September 2024.

Following the 2026 Winter Olympics, which saw a sweep by the United States in men’s and women’s ice hockey and a comment made to the men’s team by President Donald Trump seeming to downplay the victory by the women’s team, Flavor Flav posted on social media that “If the USA Women’s Hockey team wants a real celebration and invite ,,, I’ll host them in Las Vegas. Do some nice dinners and shows and good times. I’m sure I can get a hotel and airline to help me out here and celebrate these women for real for real.” The event, later announced as She Got Game Weekend, expanded to include all female Team USA Olympic and Paralympic medalists, and took place between July 16 and 19, 2026.

== Personal life and legal situations ==
Flavor Flav had his first three children with Karen Ross, three children with Angie Parker, a son with Elizabeth Trujillo, and another child with Kate Gammell.

In 1991, Flav pleaded guilty to assaulting his then-girlfriend Karen Ross and served 30 days in jail, lost custody of his children, and fell deeper into addiction. In 1993, Flav was charged with attempted murder and imprisoned for 90 days for shooting at his neighbor. Later that year, Flav was charged with domestic violence, and possession of cocaine and marijuana. His family performed an intervention, and he checked into the Betty Ford Center in Rancho Mirage, California for an addiction to crack cocaine. After Flav's father died of complications from diabetes in 1997, Flav decided to re-enter rehabilitation at the Long Island Center for Recovery. He also broke both arms in a motorcycle crash.

Flavor Flav dated Beverly Johnson and by 2000, he lived in a small apartment in the Bronx with her and her two children from a previous marriage, while making money scalping baseball tickets. In 2002, Flav spent nine weeks in Rikers Island jail for driving with a suspended license, numerous parking tickets, and tardiness for probation appointments. After being released from jail, Flav broke up with Johnson and moved in with his mother on Long Island.

Chuck D became concerned about Flav's well-being and, toward the end of 2003, suggested that Flav move to Los Angeles. Flav moved into his friend Princess' apartment, and within months met Cris Abrego and Mark Cronin, the creators and executive producers of the reality television series The Surreal Life. The pair sought him out as soon as they heard Flav had moved to Los Angeles. Seeing that he had remained free from his previous addictions, they wanted to cast him. Initially Flav refused, feeling the show was for celebrities past their prime. He was eventually convinced to join by previous participant MC Hammer.

On May 2, 2011, Flav was arrested on four outstanding misdemeanor warrants for various driving offenses. Police said Flav had two outstanding arrest warrants for driving without a license, one for driving without insurance, and one related to a parking citation. He was released within a few days. In June 2011, he said on the Australian radio show The Kyle and Jackie O Show that when his drug problem was at its worst, he would spend up to US $2,600 a day on crack cocaine. As of October 2012, Elizabeth Trujillo, the mother of Flav's son, Karma, lived with Flav in Las Vegas and had been his fiancée for eight years. On October 17, 2012, Flav was jailed in Las Vegas on felony charges stemming from a domestic argument with Trujillo and his threats to attack her teenage son, Gibran, with a knife.

Flav's mother, Anna Drayton, died on December 31, 2013. On January 9, 2014, Flav was pulled over on Long Island's Meadowbrook Parkway for driving 79 miles per hour (127 km/h) in a 55 mph (89 km/h) zone, and was additionally charged with possession of marijuana and unlicensed operation of a vehicle. Authorities discovered Flav had 16 suspensions on his license. He was en route to his mother's funeral. Flav was arrested near Las Vegas on May 21, 2015. The charges included speeding and driving under the influence.

On July 21, 2019, a son, Jordan was born to Flav and Kate Gammell. In 2021, Flav was arrested and charged with domestic battery, though the charge was later dropped when he pleaded no contest to coercion.

=== Idiosyncrasies ===
When asked about the significance of his trademark clock necklaces, Flav responded: "The reason why I wear this clock is because, you know, time is the most important element, and when we stop, time keeps going." Flavor Flav has a penchant for Illeism.

== Discography ==
Solo albums

- Hollywood (2006)

Guest appearances

- Barshem, "Where's My $5 At?", 2007
- Bumpy Knuckles & DJ Premier, "Shake the Room", Kolexxxion, 2012
- De La Soul, "Come on Down", The Grind Date, 2004
- DJ Tomekk, "1, 2, 3, ... Rhymes Galore" (w/ Grandmaster Flash, MC Rene & Afrob), Return of Hip Hop, 1999
- Heavy D and The Boyz, "You Can't See What I Can See", B-Side to "Don't Curse", 1992
- Ice Cube, "I'm Only Out for One Thang", AmeriKKKa's Most Wanted, 1990
- Material, "Burnin" (w/ DXT), Intonarumori, 1999
- Micayla de Ette, "Write a Song", 2019
- Nigo, "From New York to Tokyo", 2001
- Nikki D, "Lettin' Off Steam (Club Mix)", Daddy's Little Girl, 1991
- Prince Akeem, "Only We Can Do This", Coming Down Like Babylon, 1991
- Wu-Tang Clan, "Soul Power", Iron Flag, 2001
- Eric B. & Rakim, "I Ain't No Joke" (Music Video Cameo)
- Xzibit, "What U See Is What U Get" (Music Video Cameo)
- P. Diddy, "P.E. 2000" (Music Video Cameo)
- Taking Back Sunday, "You're So Last Summer" (Music Video Cameo)
- Will Smith, "So Fresh" (w/ Biz Markie & Slick Rick) (Music Video Cameo)

== Filmography ==
=== Film ===
Year	Title	Role	Notes
1988	Tougher Than Leather	Himself (Prison Inmate Voice)	
1990	Mo' Better Blues	Impatient Movie Patron	
1991	New Jack City	D.J.	
1992	Why Colors?	Himself	Short
1993	CB4	Himself	
1993	Who's the Man?	Himself	
1997	Private Parts	Male Nurse	
2003	Death of a Dynasty	Reporter #1	
2005	Confessions of a Pit Fighter	"Lucky"	
2006	Cain and Abel	Jim "Slim Jim"	
2015	Body High	Himself	
2015	The Sweet Taste of Redemption	-	Short
2017	The Labyrinth	"Midnight"	
2019	Hold On	Officer Drayton	
2024	Memes & Nightmares	-	
2024	Hitpig!	Chef Show Host (Voice)	

=== Television ===
Year	Title	Role	Notes
2000	Behind the Music	Himself	Episode: "Public Enemy"
2001	Top Ten	Himself	Episode: "Rap"
2002	Where Are They Now?	Himself	Episode: "Musicians"
2004	Six Months to Live	Himself	Episode: "Episode #1.2"
2004	Mad TV	Himself	Episode: "Flavor Flav/Christina Milian/Joe Budden"
2004	The Surreal Life	Himself	Main Cast: Season 3
2004	The Bernie Mac Show	Himself	Episode: "Who's That Lady?"
2004	My Wife and Kids	Himself	Episode: "The Return of Bobby Shaw"
2005	Wonder Showzen	Himself	Episode: "Birth"
2005	Strange Love	Himself	Main Cast
2005	The Farm	Himself	Episode: "Episode #2.1"
2006	VH1 Goes Inside	Himself	Episode: "Yo! MTV Raps"
2006	In the Mix	Himself	Episode: "Pursuing Happiness"
2006-2008	Flavor of Love	Himself / Host	Main Host
2007	Comedy Central Roast	Himself	Episode: "Comedy Central Roast of Flavor Flav"
2007	My Shot With	Himself	Episode: "Rock the Bells"
2007	Criss Angel Mindfreak	Himself	Episode: "Mentalism"
2008-2009	Under One Roof	Calvester "Cali Cal" Hill	Main Cast
2009	Nite Tales: The Series	Himself / Host	Main Host
2010	WWE Raw	Himself	Episode: "New Raw GM"
2012	Celebrity Wife Swap	Himself	Episode: "Flavor Flav/Dee Snider"
2012	YooHoo & Friends	Father Time (voice)	Main Cast
2012	Dr. Fubalous	Papa Skwaught	Main Cast
2013	Couples Therapy	Himself	Main Cast: Season 3
2013	Criss Angel Believe	Himself	Episode: "Levitate Shaq"
2014	Restaurant Stakeout	Himself	Episode: "Hoover Dam'd Pizza"
2018	A.P. Bio	Himself	Episode: "Selling Out"
2019	Bigfoot Littlefoot	Bigfoot Kevin (voice)	Episode: "Bigfoot Littlefoot Begins"
2019	WTF, Baron Davis	Lavante	Episode: "Kenny's Side Hustle"
2019	Dear White People	-	Episode: "Vol. 3: Chapter X"
2019	Growing Up Hip Hop: New York	Himself	Recurring Cast
2020	TNA Impact!	Himself	Episode: "Contenders Beware"
2021	Cakealikes	Himself / Guest Judge	Episode: "Flavor Flav"
2021	For Real: The Story of Reality TV	Himself	Episode: "Addicted to Love"
2022	Criss Angel's Magic with the Stars	Himself	Episode: "100 Foot Rope Escape"
2023	Hip Hop Treasures	Himself	Episode: "Flavor Flav/CeeLo Green/The Furious Five"
2024	Celebrity Family Feud	Himself / Contestant	Episode: "Episode #11.7"
2025	The Masked Singer	Himself / Space Ranger	Contestant: Season 13
2025	Wheel of Fortune	Himself	Episode: "iHeartRadio Week 3"
2025	Quarterback	Himself	Episode: "Final Steps"
2025	Gown and Out in Beverly Hills	Himself	Episode: "Episode #5.5"
2025	Dancing with the Stars	Himself / Guest Judge	Episode: "Rock & Roll Hall of Fame Night"
2026	Scrubs	Himself / Father Time	Episode: "My Mentee"
