= Mobb music =

Music genre

- Other names: Bay Area rap; Bay Area hip hop; Mob
- Stylistic origins: West Coast hip hop; gangsta rap; funk; soul
- Cultural origins: Mid 1980s, San Francisco Bay Area, California, U.S.
- Typical instruments: DJ equipments; turntables; DJ mixer; music workstation; sampler; sequencer; drum machine; synthesizer; electric piano; electric guitar; electric bass guitar
- Derivative forms: dirty rap; conscious rap; gangsta rap; political rap

Subgenres
- Hyphy

Regional scenes
- San Francisco Bay Area

Local scenes
- Oakland; San Francisco; Vallejo; Richmond; Daly City

Other topics
- funktronica; Bay Area hip-hop

Mobb music is a fusion subgenre of hip-hop and funk that emerged from the San Francisco Bay Area in the late 1980s, characterized by its slow, bass-heavy beats, deep storytelling, and gritty street narratives. It is closely associated with Bay Area hip-hop culture, which has influenced various hip-hop movements, including the hyphy era of the mid-2000s. Pioneering artists like Too Short, E-40 and Mac Mall were instrumental in shaping the genre, with notable albums such as Too $hort's Short Dog's in the House (1990), Mac Mall's Illegal Business? (1993), E-40's In a Major Way (1995). Mobb Music laid the foundation for later Bay Area movements like Hyphy, influencing the region's hip-hop sound and culture.

== Characteristics ==
=== Production ===
Mobb music, often shortened to Mobb, is characterized by a heavy, deliberate sonic profile that typically operates within a tempo range of 80 to 100 BPM, representing an evolutionary shift away from early West Coast electro-hop. Structurally, the genre favors extended, long-form arrangements driven by an intricate, heavily layered texture. This framework is anchored by analog drum machines, most notably the Roland TR-808, which makes that electronic sound rather than acoustic drum sound. A core structural element is the prominent placement of sharp claps on the second and fourth beats of each measure, creating a pounding, deliberate cadence. Layered over this percussion are signature low-end frequencies, distinguished by the frequent use of "fat" resonant bass synths and complex melodies that create a raw, performance-based, and organic sound.

While sharing a historical foundation in West Coast hip-hop, Mobb features major compositional differences from mainstream Southern California G-funk. While G-funk typically replayed or interpolated a single, recognizable P-Funk sample with minor melodic embellishments to achieve a polished, fluid sound, the Mobb production method relies on an extensive mixture of multiple samples. Producers blend fragments from various musical sources, utilizing live-in-the-studio instrumentation to heavily alter, expand, and reshape these combined elements into entirely new, original compositions. This approach gives the genre a more rigid, electronic, and pounding framework.

Production within the genre generally has two distinct styles:

- One style is a brighter, more festive, and more upbeat soundscape that relies on infectious, rolling funk grooves intended to create an energetic, feel-good party atmosphere.
- In contrast, the other style explores a much darker, ominous, and menacing soundscape.

The genre is also often lumped into the hardcore hip hop genre due to its raw production values and aggressive thematic focus.

=== Lyrical themes ===
While frequently associated strictly with gangsta rap and dirty rap due to the regional prevalence of pimp and gang cultures, the lyrical themes of the genre extend beyond these elements. Broadly speaking, the subject matter often explores serious political issues and social commentary, incorporating elements of conscious rap alongside street narratives.

=== Rapping ===
A defining vocal characteristic of the genre is the extensive use of a laid-back delivery, wherein performers intentionally rap slightly behind the beat. Rather than resulting in an off-beat performance, this technique enhances the overall rhythmic groove. The cadence remains structurally precise, as the relative intervals and distances between the rhythmic accents are kept strictly uniform and consistent throughout the delivery.

== History and origins ==
=== 1985–1989: Foundations ===
Prior to the emergence of the genre, the Northern California hip-hop scene was heavily rooted in electronic-heavy sounds, exemplified by tracks like "On the Nile". This electro-hop era deeply influenced Too $hort, who began building a local following through the Oakland-based cable channel Soul Beat. This televised exposure allowed him to pioneer an independent cassette-tape network, selling his music directly from the trunk of his car to the local community.

In 1987, Too $hort established Dangerous Music and released his fourth studio album, Born to Mack. The record marked a drastic shift toward deliberate, down-tempo narrative street rapping. The defining catalyst of this era was the landmark 1987 track "Freaky Tales". Spanning over ten minutes, the song’s highly minimalist, slow arrangement completely altered the regional soundscape. "Freaky Tales", alongside "Dope Fiend Beat", proved to local musicians that extended storytelling could thrive over a stripped-back rhythm. This independent blueprint laid the foundation for the local rap scene, just as the familial group The Click was beginning to emerge in nearby Vallejo.

=== 1990–1997: Mainstream peak ===
In 1990, regional producers began aggressively expanding upon the independent tape foundations of the late 1980s. Too $hort maintained his leading role during this transition with his major-label album Short Dog's in the House, which paired explicit urban tales with slow, regional grooves. Crucial to this landmark project was Al Eaton, who emerged as the subgenre's first professional producer and co-produced the album's massive hit single "The Ghetto". Throughout the decade, Eaton's clean technical studio standards heavily shaped the sound of several core acts, including The Click, Rappin' 4-Tay, and Spice 1. His early recording blueprint also extended to No Limit Records and his engineering work on the debut album Grits Sandwiches for Breakfast by Kid Rock.

The year 1990 also saw San Francisco rapper Paris release his influential debut The Devil Made Me Do It. Deeply influenced by the Black Panthers and his time in the Nation of Islam, Paris used this album to combine the local Mobb sound with hardcore hip-hop, creating a musical mixture very similar to what Ice Cube achieved with AmeriKKKa's Most Wanted in blending West Coast hip-hop and hardcore rap. This release fundamentally altered the genre by introducing the militant, socially conscious ideology of Public Enemy to the West Coast, proving the sound could accommodate serious political themes beyond traditional street topics. The year 1990 also saw the introduction of the highly influential yet lesser-known Oakland group 415, formed by rappers Richie Rich and D-Loc alongside producers DJ Daryl and J.E.D., who debuted with their underground classic album 41fivin. Simultaneously, Richie Rich launched his solo career with his debut album Don't Do It, helping to establish a raw, foundational aesthetic for Oakland street rap.

In 1991, 2Pac released his debut album 2Pacalypse Now. While not a traditional gangsta rap or dirty rap album, its production was heavily inspired by the slow, bass-driven Northern California blueprint. By blending these local grooves with dense socio-political narratives, 2Pac further bridged the gap between the region's raw musical production and East Coast-style conscious lyricism. That same year, the group 415 expanded their underground footprint by releasing Nu Niggaz on tha Blokkk, reinforcing the gritty, performance-based Oakland street aesthetic that became central to the genre's growth.

In 1992, Too $hort released Shorty the Pimp, continuing his signature bass-driven production style. That same year, Paris released his heavily banned yet highly influential sophomore album Sleeping with the Enemy, reinforcing the political dimension of the local scene. Concurrently, the Vallejo production duo Mob Boss Productions, consisting of Mike Mosley and Sam Bostic, established a slow, sub-sonic, and highly melodic groove. Local artists E-40 and Celly Cel subsequently utilized this style and officially popularized the term "Mobb" to describe the collective movement. The year 1992 also marked the initial cross-genre expansion of the sound when the Chicano rap group N2Deep released their local anthem "Back to the Hotel". A distinct network of regional producers drove this evolution, including Khayree, Studio Ton, Ant Banks, E-A-Ski, and Rick Rock.

In 1993, the subgenre's geographic footprint and thematic boundaries expanded significantly. E-40 reinvented the genre's vocal approach on his studio album Federal, utilizing a highly erratic, rapid-fire flow, while his single "Captain Save a Hoe" propelled the sound into the mainstream and established his independent label, Sick Wid It Records. 2Pac released his second album Strictly 4 My N.I.G.G.A.Z..., which maintained a heavy Mobb-inspired musical foundation but heavily utilized a hardcore hip-hop sound, leaning on aggressive drum beats very similar to the style of Ice Cube or Paris. This approach further cemented his role in bringing revolutionary political commentary to West Coast instrumentals. Simultaneously, Spice 1 achieved national success with 187 He Wrote, featuring co-production by Ant Banks, making him one of the first local acts to secure a major contract with Jive Records. That same year, Mac Mall's landmark debut Illegal Business?, produced by Khayree, introduced an introspective street commentary with the single "Ghetto Theme", while Mac Dre's early work was showcased on projects like Young Black Brotha. In Sacramento, C-Bo took the sound in a highly aggressive direction with his debut Gas Chamber, blending local styles with explicit hardcore themes.

In 1994, the movement continued to diversify as Paris finalized his trilogy of politically charged albums with Guerrilla Funk, an album whose title and production directly celebrated the region's evolving sound. The scene grew to include San Francisco groups like I.M.P. and RBL Posse, Vallejo's Celly Cel, and JT the Bigga Figga with his hit "Game Recognize Game". That same year, The Click released Down and Dirty, showcasing complex vocal chemistry, and Oakland's female duo Conscious Daughters contributed to the expanding landscape with their hit "Somethin' to Ride To (Fonky Expedition)".

In 1995, the movement reached its commercial peak and expanded its artistic boundaries. The Luniz achieved massive success with the single I Got 5 on It. In Sacramento, Brotha Lynch Hung pushed the genre's darkest boundaries with Season of da Siccness, a record that became foundational to the horrorcore style. The commercial zenith of the era arrived with E-40's masterpiece, In a Major Way, which is widely cited as the defining Bay Area album of the era. The album refined the signature elements of the movement, spawning the massive crossover hit Sprinkle Me. The project climbed to No. 13 on the Billboard 200 and No. 2 on the Top R&B/Hip-Hop Albums chart, eventually earning RIAA platinum status.

In 1996, the genre maintained its commercial and artistic momentum. E-40 released his gold-certified album Tha Hall of Game, which expanded the subgenre's reach with singles like "Things'll Never Change" and "Rapper's Ball". This output was balanced by the raw, aggressive style of artists like C-Bo and the heavy-rolling instrumentation showcased on B-Legit's The Hemp Museum. This year also marked a massive solo resurgence for Richie Rich, who delivered two definitive albums: his second independent project Half Thang, followed closely by his critically and commercially successful Def Jam debut, Seasoned Veteran.

=== 1998–present: Influences on modern hip hop ===
In the late 1990s, Mobb Music's influence began to fade as the Bay Area's sound evolved, particularly with the rise of the hyphy movement in the early 2000s. Hyphy, driven by faster, bass-heavy beats, contrasted Mobb Music's darker, street-oriented sound.

Hyphy Movement and Key Figures

The hyphy movement emerged in Oakland, with Traxamillion producing tracks like Keak Da Sneak's "Super Hyphy," which popularized the term. "Getting hyphy" became a cultural marker, defined by wild dancing and car "sideshows." Mac Dre, a major figure, helped propel hyphy into mainstream attention with his Thizz Entertainment label, influencing artists like E-40 and Andre Nickatina. Mac Dre's death in 2004 solidified his legacy in the scene.

Hyphy's Influence and Legacy

While hyphy briefly peaked in the mid-2000s, its energy and influence lingered. Mobb Music's darker, bass-driven style continued in the underground, with artists like Larry June and Mozzy maintaining the spirit of the Bay Area sound. Hyphy's culture and sound still echo in modern hip-hop, preserving its place in the genre's evolution.

== See also ==
- Bay Area hip-hop
- West Coast hip hop
