= Rebirth of a Nation =

Studio album by Public Enemy and Paris
- Released: March 7, 2006
- Genres: East Coast hip-hop; political hip-hop
- Length: 1:05:46
- Label: Guerrilla Funk Recordings
- Producer: Paris

Public Enemy chronology
New Whirl Odor (2005)	Rebirth of a Nation (2006)	How You Sell Soul to a Soulless People Who Sold Their Soul??? (2007)

Paris chronology
Sonic Jihad (2003)	Rebirth of a Nation (2006)	Acid Reflex (2008)

Singles from Rebirth of a Nation
- 1. "Can't Hold Us Back" Released: 2005

Professional ratings
Review scores
Source	Rating
AllMusic	3/5 stars
The Guardian	2/5 stars
HipHopDX	3.5/5 stars
RapReviews	8/10
Robert Christgau	A−
Tom Hull – on the Web	A
XXL	3/5 stars

Rebirth of a Nation is a collaborative studio album by American hip hop group Public Enemy and rapper/producer Paris. Its title is a reference to the 1915 white supremacist film The Birth of a Nation as well as one of the group's prior albums, It Takes a Nation of Millions to Hold Us Back. Despite the Public Enemy branding on the album, many tracks were written and produced by Paris; the album itself was deemed a "special project" by Chuck D in order to differentiate it from other Public Enemy works. It was released on March 7, 2006 through Guerrilla Funk Recordings with distribution via Caroline Distribution. The album was mixed and mastered at Data Stream Studio in San Francisco, California. The album features guest appearances from Dead Prez, MC Ren, Kam, Sister Souljah, The Conscious Daughters, Immortal Technique and Professor Griff. Rebirth of a Nation peaked at number 180 on the Billboard 200 albums chart in the United States and sold 5,592 units in its first week out.

== Critical reception ==
Robert Christgau stated: "PE's best album in nearly a decade was overseen by Oakland Muslim-stockbroker-revolutionary Paris, who puts his stamp on its functional funk and unyielding class consciousness. In fact, with its international perspective and bitter 'People on the bottom kill each other for scraps,' Paris's 'Hannibal Lecture' boasts the sharpest lyric on the record. But he's got competition--from a retrofitted Jesse Jackson, from Professor Griff if you can believe that, even from reality TV 'ho Flavor Flav: 'I'm in your mouth when you wake in the morning/I'm the stink on your breath when you're yawning.' But mostly, of course, from Mistachuck, whose musicality carries the record--and who folded in a Katrina song after the CD was done."

== Track listing ==
All music is composed by Oscar Jerome Jackson, Jr..

No.	Title	Length
1.	"Raw Shit" (featuring Paris and MC Ren)	4:16
2.	"Hard Rhymin'" (featuring Paris and Sister Souljah)	4:41
3.	"Rise"	4:08
4.	"Can't Hold Us Back" (featuring Dead Prez and Kam)	5:07
5.	"Hard Truth Soldiers" (featuring Dead Prez, The Conscious Daughters and MC Ren)	4:18
6.	"Hannibal Lecture" (featuring Paris)	3:50
7.	"Rebirth of a Nation" (featuring Professor Griff)	3:27
8.	"Pump the Music, Pump the Sound"	2:28
9.	"Make It Hardcore" (featuring Paris)	5:16
10.	"They Call Me Flavor"	3:09
11.	"Plastic Nation"	3:03
12.	"Coinsequences" (featuring Paris)	4:19
13.	"Invisible Man"	4:28
14.	"Hell No We Ain't All Right! (Paris Remix)"	4:31
15.	"Watch the Door"	3:35
16.	"Field Nigga Boogie (XLR8R Remix)" (featuring Paris and Immortal Technique)	5:10
Total length:		1:05:46

== Chart history ==
Chart (2006)	Peak position
US Billboard 200	180
US Top R&B/Hip-Hop Albums (Billboard)	54
US Independent Albums (Billboard)	16
