= Ear to the Street =

Studio album by the Conscious Daughters
- Released: November 30, 1993
- Recorded: 1992–1993
- Genres: Gangsta rap, West Coast hip hop
- Labels: Scarface; Priority
- Producer: Paris

The Conscious Daughters chronology
Ear to the Street (1993)	Gamers (1996)

Singles from Ear to the Street
- 1. "Somethin' to Ride To (Fonky Expedition)" Released: 1993; 2. "We Roll Deep" Released: 1993

Ear to the Street is the debut studio album by American hip hop duo the Conscious Daughters. It was released in 1993 via Scarface Records and Priority Records. The album peaked at No. 126 on the Billboard 200, at No. 25 on the Top R&B/Hip-Hop Albums chart, and at No. 7 on the Heatseekers Albums. It spawned two singles, "Somethin' to Ride To (Fonky Expedition)" and "We Roll Deep", both of which made it to the Billboard charts.

== Production ==
The album was produced by Paris, who also wrote the tracks and contributed instrumentation. It was engineered by Eric Valentine. The album came out two years after the duo had given Paris their demo tape.

== Critical reception ==
Professional ratings
Review scores
Source	Rating
AllMusic	3/5 stars
The Encyclopedia of Popular Music	3/5 stars

Trouser Press deemed the album a "busy-beat debut," calling the group "a young Oakland tag team possessing average skills, big attitudes and no pretense of political awareness." The East Bay Express wrote that the album's two singles "are recognized as classics in the hip-hop canon." Complex listed "Fonky Expedition" at No. 46 on its list of "The 50 Greatest Bay Area Rap Songs."

== Track listing ==
No.	Title	Length
1.	"Princess of Poetry"
2.	"Shitty Situation"
3.	"TCD in da Front"
4.	"Somethin' to Ride To (Fonky Expedition)"
5.	"We Roll Deep"
6.	"Showdown (feat. Paris)"
7.	"Wife of a Gangsta"
8.	"Dex Dog"
9.	"Crazybitchmadness"
10.	"Da Mac Flow"
11.	"What's a Girl to Do?"

== Personnel ==
- Carla "CMG" Green – vocals
- Karryl "Special One" Smith – vocals
- DJ Yon – scratches
- Oscar Jerome Jackson, Jr. – producer
- Eric Dodd – engineering
- Todd D. Smith – design
- Victor Hall – photography

== Charts ==
Chart (1994)	Peak position
US Billboard 200	126
US Top R&B/Hip-Hop Albums (Billboard)	25
US Heatseekers Albums (Billboard)	7
