= Sonic Jihad =

Sonic Jihad may refer to:

- Sonic Jihad (Snake River Conspiracy album), 2000 debut from the rock band Snake River Conspiracy
- Sonic Jihad (Paris album), 2003 album from rapper Paris
