= Gamers (album) =

Studio album by The Conscious Daughters
- Released: March 5, 1996
- Recorded: 1994–1995
- Studios: Infinite Studios (Alameda, CA); Mobbin' Studios (Fairfield, CA); Scarface Sound West (Redwood City, CA); The Mobb Shop (Vallejo, CA); Conscious Sound Productions (San Rafael, CA); Hyde Street Studios (San Francisco, CA)
- Genre: Hip-hop
- Length: 1:00:39
- Label: Priority
- Producers: Michael Denten; Mike Mosley; Nate Fox; Paris; Rose; Studio Ton; Tone Capone

The Conscious Daughters chronology
Ear to the Street (1993)	Gamers (1996)	The Nutcracker Suite (2009)

Singles from Gamers
- 1. "Gamers" Released: 1996

Professional ratings
Review scores
Source	Rating
AllMusic	3/5 stars

Gamers is the second studio album by American hip-hop duo The Conscious Daughters. It was released on March 5, 1996, via Priority Records. Recording sessions took place at Infinite Studios in Alameda, Mobbin' Studios in Fairfield, Scarface Sound West in Redwood City, The Mobb Shop in Vallejo, Conscious Sound Productions in San Rafael and Hyde Street Studios in San Francisco. Production was handled by Paris, Tone Capone, Michael Denten, Mike Mosley, Nate Fox, Rose and Studio Ton, with co-producers Sam Bostic, Scott Gordon and the Conscious Daughters themselves.

The album peaked at number 29 on the Top R&B/Hip-Hop Albums chart in the United States. Its lead single, "Gamers", made it to number 24 on the Bubbling Under Hot 100, number 65 on the Hot R&B/Hip-Hop Songs, number 25 on the Hot Rap Songs and number 60 on the Hot R&B/Hip-Hop Singles Sales charts.

== Track listing ==
No.	Title	Writer(s)	Producer(s)	Length
1.	"Strikin'"	Karryl Smith; Carla Green	Nate Fox	4:19
2.	"Gamers"	Smith; Green	Mike Mosley; Sam Bostic (co.)	4:30
3.	"You Want Me"	Smith; Green	Paris	3:00
4.	"All Caught Up"	Smith; Green; Oscar Jackson	Paris	3:46
5.	"She's So Tight"	Smith; Green	Studio Ton	4:16
6.	"It Don't Stop"	Smith; Green; F. Morales; Mandolyn Ludlum; Tenina Stevens	Tone Capone	5:14
7.	"Female Vocalism"	Smith; Green; E. Brooks	Rose	4:08
8.	"Da Mack Hit"	Smith; Green; Jackson	Paris	3:29
9.	"Who Got da Mic"	Smith; Green	Tone Capone	4:16
10.	"TCS Fo' Life (West Coast Bomb)"	Smith; Green; Jackson	Paris	3:32
11.	"Come Smooth, Come Rude"	Smith; Green; Jackson	Paris	4:07
12.	"Widow"	Smith; Green; Brooks	Paris	4:03
13.	"So Good"	Smith; Green	Paris	4:49
14.	"All Star Freestyle"		Michael Denten; Scott Gordon (co.); The Conscious Daughters (co.)	7:10
Total length:				1:00:39

Sample credits

- Track 6 contains a musical sample from "Stay a Little While, Child" written by Steve Nichol, Carl McIntosh and Jane Eugene and performed by Loose End.

== Personnel ==
- Karryl "Special One" Smith – vocals, co-producer (track 14), executive producer
- Carla "C.M.G." Green – vocals, co-producer (track 14), executive producer
- Nate Grogran – additional backing vocals, producer & mixing (track 1)
- Rodney "Harm" Waller – vocals (tracks: 2, 14), additional keyboards (track 9)
- F. "Baby Doll" Morales – vocals (track 6)
- Mandolyn "Mystic" Ludlum – vocals (tracks: 6, 10, 14), additional vocals (track 9)
- Tenina "Suga-T" Stevens – vocals (tracks: 6, )
- Rose – backing vocals & producer (track 7)
- Sandy Griffith – vocals (track 11)
- Reggie "Saafir" Gibson – vocals (track 14)
- Damani M. "Father Dom" Khaleel – vocals (track 14)
- Jamal "Mac Mall" Rocker – vocals (track 14)
- Ronald "Money-B" Brooks – vocals (track 14)
- Cleveland "Clee" Askew – vocals (track 14)
- Marcus "C-Funk" McKinley – vocals (track 14)
- Peter Boyd – bass guitar (track 1)
- DJ Yonie Yon – scratches (track 5)
- Scott "One Scott Drop" Roberts – additional keyboards (track 6)
- Gary Bolden – bass guitar (track 9)
- Mike Mosley – producer & mixing (track 2)
- Oscar "Paris" Jackson Jr. – producer (tracks: 3, 4, 8, 10–13), mixing (tracks: 1, 4, 6–12), additional mixing (track 2), executive producer
- Marvin "Studio Ton" Whitemon – producer (track 5)
- Anthony "Tone Capone" Gilmour – producer (tracks: 6, 9)
- Michael Denten – producer (track 14), engineering (tracks: 1, 2, 4, 6, 8–11, 14)
- Sam Bostic – co-producer & mixing (track 2)
- Scott Gordon – co-producer (track 14)
- Eric Valentine – engineering (tracks: 1–4, 6–13)
- Benjamin Grant DePauw – engineering (tracks: 7, 12)
- Todd D. Smith – art direction, graphics, layout
- Marcus Hanschen – photography
- Tyronne "Casual T" White – A&R
- Dana Mason – A&R
- Tim Reid II – management

== Charts ==
Chart (1996)	Peak position
US Top R&B/Hip-Hop Albums (Billboard)	29
