= Hell No We Ain't All Right! =

"Hell No We Ain't All Right"
- Single cover

Single by Public Enemy

from the album Rebirth of a Nation
- Released: 2005
- Recorded: 2005
- Genre: Political hip hop, protest song
- Label: Guerrilla Funk Recordings
- Songwriter: Chuck D
- Producer: Public Enemy

Public Enemy singles chronology
"Do You Wanna Go Our Way?" (1999)	"Hell No We Ain't All Right" (2005)	"Black is Back" (2007)

"Hell No We Ain't All Right!" is a protest song released by hip hop group Public Enemy within weeks of Hurricane Katrina, criticizing President George W. Bush and his administration for his response to the catastrophe, and for wider administration policies. The song specifically links the poor response to the hurricane to the commitment of resources to the war in Iraq, and to the social status of most victims of the disaster. The song was reportedly written by Chuck D on September 2, 2005, and reunited Flavor Flav with Public Enemy for its recording over Labor Day weekend. The premier public performance was on the Morning Sedition radio show, on September 16, 2005.

In addition to Bush and the Bush administration, the song also levels barbs at Pat Robertson (who had recently called for the assassination of Venezuelan president Hugo Chávez), Halliburton, and the characterization of Black people as "looters" following the catastrophe.

The refrain of the song repeats the line, "New Orleans in the morning, afternoon, and night/Hell No We Ain't All Right". Similar themes were explored in a contemporaneous song, "George Bush Doesn't Care About Black People", a remix of Kanye West's "Gold Digger" by "The Legendary K.O.", which was widely circulated on the internet following Hurricane Katrina.
