= Unleashed (Paris album) =

Studio album by Paris
- Released: February 24, 1998
- Recorded: 1994−1997
- Genres: Political hip-hop, West Coast hip-hop, conscious hip-hop, G-funk, gangsta rap
- Label: Whirling Records
- Producers: Paris, GO Twice, G-Man Stan

Paris chronology
Guerrilla Funk (1994)	Unleashed (1998)	Sonic Jihad (2003)

Professional ratings
Review scores
Source	Rating
AllMusic	2.5/5 stars
The Encyclopedia of Popular Music	2/5 stars
RapReviews	7.5/10

Unleashed is the fourth studio album by American rapper Paris, released on February 24, 1998, by Whirling Records.

"Blast First" was a moderate success, making the Billboard Hot R&B Singles chart.

== Critical reception ==
Nathan Rabin of AllMusic wrote that "Paris' gruff baritone remains as powerful and commanding as ever, but it's depressing to hear someone whose work once resonated with conviction and idealism spit gangsta rap clichés like some sort of lost Suge Knight flunky."

== Track listing ==
1. "Mob On" (featuring Spice 1) - 3:35
2. "Blast First" - 3:56
3. "Record Label Murder" - 2:30
4. "Fair Weather Friendz" - 4:26
5. "Everyday Livin'" (featuring Jet) - 3:51
6. "Thug Livin'" (featuring Nutt-So) - 5:13
7. "Root of All Evil" - 4:09
8. "Heat" (featuring Jet, Spice 1) - 3:43
9. "Street Soldier" - 4:26
10. "44 Wayz" (featuring Mystic) - 4:12
11. "Conversation" - 3:35
12. "Same Ol' Same Ol'" (featuring Jet) - 4:19

European release:

1. Mob On
2. Fair Weather Friendz
3. Ride with Me
4. Act Right
5. Street Soldier
6. It Don't Stop
7. 44 Wayz
8. Root of All Evil
9. Widow (featuring The Conscious Daughters)
10. Sucka Free (featuring Spice 1)
11. Record Label Murder
12. Conversation
13. 4 da Ridaz (Instrumental)
14. Blast First
