= George Bush Doesn't Care About Black People =

Single by The Legendary K.O.
- Released: September 6, 2005
- Recorded: Houston, Texas
- Genre: Hip hop
- Length: 3:48
- Songwriters: Big Mon and Damien aka Dem Knock-Out Boyz
- Producers: Kanye West & Jon Brion

"George Bush Doesn't Care About Black People" is a protest song by Houston-based hip hop duo The Legendary K.O. It was released on September 6, 2005, just days after Hurricane Katrina. The song was a single first published for free under the Creative Commons Attribution-NonCommercial-ShareAlike 2.5 license, on FWMJ's Rappers I Know website. It has been described as "vividly topical", and "one of the best political protest songs of all time".

== History ==
The politically charged song is a response to the Bush administration's heavily criticized response to Hurricane Katrina. Its title comes directly from a statement Kanye West made on U.S. national television.

It is a mash-up with a beat from Kanye West's song "Gold Digger". The first line in the song is a quote from West speaking at A Concert for Hurricane Relief. The song was "recorded on home computers and composed through emails and instant messaging", and spread widely over the Internet for several weeks after the catastrophe, in some cases backing video mash-ups with photo montages from the hurricane.

The song specifically criticized George W. Bush for his slow reaction to the plight of New Orleans. It "vividly recounts the plight of those who endured the hurricane", telling its story in part in the voice of a Katrina survivor giving a first-person account of the hardships of the time, alternating with direct criticism of President Bush and his perceived priorities.

The refrain asserts that "George Bush ain't a gold digger, but he ain't messin with no broke niggas" (a modified version of the line from the original Gold Digger), and implores, "come down, Bush, come on, come down" to New Orleans. Similar themes, including the characterization of black victims of the hurricane as looters, were explored by Public Enemy in a contemporaneous single, "Hell No We Ain't All Right!" The narrative thereby seeks to shift the perception of Katrina victims, effecting "a reconfiguration of storm survivors, from threatening others to abandoned Americans".
