= Guerrilla Funk =

Studio album by Paris
- Released: October 4, 1994
- Recorded: 1993−1994
- Studio: Scarface Sound West (San Francisco, CA)
- Genre: Hip hop, G-funk, political rap
- Label: Priority
- Producer: Paris

Paris chronology
| Sleeping with the Enemy (1992) | Guerrilla Funk (1994) | Unleashed (1998) |

Singles from Guerrilla Funk
- 1. "Guerrilla Funk" Released: 1994; 2. "Outta My Life" Released: 1994

Professional ratings
Review scores
| Source | Rating |
|---|---|
| AllMusic | 4/5 stars |

Guerrilla Funk is the third studio album by American rapper Paris. It was released on October 4, 1994, via Priority Records, and has been re-released in a limited 2003 release subtitled The Deluxe Edition via Guerrilla Funk Recordings; it was digitally enhanced, reworked, and contains alternate versions.

== Track listing ==
All tracks are written by Oscar Jerome Jackson, Jr..

| No. | Title | Length |
|---|---|---|
| 1. | "Prelude" | 1:13 |
| 2. | "It's Real" | 4:47 |
| 3. | "One Time Fo' Ya Mind" | 4:40 |
| 4. | "Guerrilla Funk" | 4:55 |
| 5. | "Blacks & Blues" | 0:44 |
| 6. | "Bring It to Ya" (featuring The Conscious Daughters) | 5:15 |
| 7. | "Outta My Life" | 5:05 |
| 8. | "Whatcha See?" | 4:50 |
| 9. | "40 Ounces and a Fool" (featuring Da Old Skool) | 1:17 |
| 10. | "Back in the Day" | 4:35 |
| 11. | "Guerrilla Funk" (Deep Fo' Real Mix) | 7:58 |
| 12. | "It's Real" (Extended Movement Mix) | 7:27 |
| 13. | "Shots Out" | 2:11 |

== Sample credits ==
- "Outta My Life"
  - "Yearning for Your Love" by The Gap Band
- "Bring It To Ya"
  - "Knucklehead" by Grover Washington Jr.
- "Guerilla Funk"
  - "(Not Just) Knee Deep" by Funkadelic
  - "Dukey Stick" by George Duke
  - "The Big Bang Theory" by Parliament
- "It's Real"
  - "(Not Just) Knee Deep" by Funkadelic
  - "Atomic Dog" by George Clinton
- "One Time Fo' Ya Mind"
  - "Think (About It)" by Lyn Collins
- "Whatcha See?"
  - "Hold It Now, Hit It" by Beastie Boys
  - "I Get Around" by 2Pac

== Personnel ==
- Oscar Jerome Jackson, Jr. – main artist, producer
- Carla "CMG" Green – vocals (track 6)
- Karryl "Special One" Smith – vocals (track 6)
- Da Old Skool – vocals (track 9)
- Eric Bertraud – saxophone
- Eric Dodd – engineering
- Todd D. Smith – artwork
- Victor Hall – photography

== Chart history ==
| Chart (1994) | Peak position |
|---|---|
| US Billboard 200 | 128 |
| US Top R&B/Hip-Hop Albums (Billboard) | 20 |
| US Heatseekers Albums (Billboard) | 2 |
