= Sounds Like a Revolution =

2010 Canadian documentary film

- Film poster
- Directed by: Summer "Love" Preney; Jane Michener
- Written by: Margaret Susan Martin
- Produced by: Summer "Love" Preney; Jane Michener
- Starring: Michael Franti; Michael Burkett; Oscar Jackson, Jr.; Jello Biafra
- Narrated by: Jackie Richardson
- Edited by: Tiffany Beaudin; Michael Corbiere; Stephen Philipson
- Music by: Mischa Chillak
- Release date: June 16, 2010
- Running time: 58 minutes
- Country: Canada
- Language: English

Sounds Like a Revolution is a 2010 Canadian documentary film about recent protest music in the United States. Directed by Summer Love and Jane Michener, the film premiered on June 16, 2010 in Toronto.

Focusing on the personal experiences of four independent musicians, the film portrays Michael Franti, Fat Mike, Paris and Anti-Flag and a collection of live performances, political rallies, music videos and uncensored commentaries from Pete Seeger, the Dixie Chicks, David Crosby, Steve Earle, Jello Biafra, Ani DiFranco, Wayne Kramer, Tom Morello and more.

== Cast ==
- Jello Biafra
- Rob Bowman
- David Crosby
- Alan Cross
- Davey D
- Ani DiFranco
- Steve Earle
- Michael Franti
- Ice-T
- Al Jourgensen
- Fat Mike
- Tom Morello
- Natalie Pa'apa'a
- Paris
- Jackie Richardson
- Boots Riley
- Henry Rollins
- Justin Sane
- Pete Seeger
- Spearhead

== Music ==
The documentary features songs from Anti-Flag, NOFX, Paris, Michael Franti & Spearhead, Blue King Brown and The Disposable Heroes of Hiphoprisy. Also additional songs are included from the Dixie Chicks, Ministry, Body Count, Johnny Dix and The Coup.
