= Gold Digger (Kanye West song) =

- Cover art for the CD release of "Gold Digger"

Single by Kanye West featuring Jamie Foxx

from the album Late Registration
- Released: July 5, 2005
- Recorded: Late 2003–2005
- Studio: The Record Plant (Hollywood); Sony Music (New York City); Chalice Recording; Grandmaster Recording (Hollywood)
- Genre: Pop rap
- Length: 3:28
- Label: Roc-A-Fella; Def Jam
- Songwriters: Kanye West; Ray Charles; Renald Richard
- Producers: Kanye West; Jon Brion

Kanye West singles chronology
"Go!" (2005)	"Gold Digger" (2005)	"Number One" (2005)

Jamie Foxx singles chronology
"Slow Jamz" (2003)	"Gold Digger" (2005)	"Extravaganza" (2005)

Music video
- "Gold Digger" on YouTube

"Gold Digger" is a song by the American rapper Kanye West featuring the American singer Jamie Foxx, from West's second studio album, Late Registration (2005). The song includes additional vocals from Plain Pat and Don C. West created the beat in Atlanta. He and Jon Brion produced the song. It was originally set to be recorded for Shawnna's debut studio album, Worth Tha Weight (2004), but the song was later passed on to West. On July 5, 2005, it was released to American rhythmic contemporary radio stations by Roc-A-Fella and Def Jam as the second single from West's album. The song set a record for the most digital downloads in a week, selling over 80,000.

A pop rap song, "Gold Digger" samples Ray Charles's "I Got a Woman" (1954), mainly the line "she give me money when I'm in need". Lyrically, Foxx sets the stage by detailing how he was taken by a gold digger and West raps in each verse about the behaviors and characteristics of one, alluding to a woman who tricked him. The song received widespread acclaim from music critics, who often praised the composition. Some complimented the lyrical content and Foxx's feature, while a few critics highlighted the sample. The song was named to year-end lists for 2005 by multiple publications, including Eye Weekly, NME, and Pazz & Jop, the latter of which it was voted the single of the year. Numerous outlets have placed it on retrospective lists, such as VH1 and Rolling Stone. At the 48th Annual Grammy Awards, the song won Best Rap Solo Performance and also received a nomination for Record of the Year.

"Gold Digger" topped the US Billboard Hot 100, ARIA Singles Chart, and NZ Singles Chart, becoming West's second number-one single on the Hot 100, and his first on the latter two charts. The song reached the top 50 in nine other countries, such as Ireland and the United Kingdom. On Billboard's 60th anniversary in 2018, it was ranked the 70th biggest Hot 100 hit of all time. Having since been certified octuple platinum in the United States by the Recording Industry Association of America (RIAA), the song places among the highest certified digital singles in the US. It has also been awarded quadruple platinum certifications in Australia and the UK by the Australian Recording Industry Association (ARIA) and British Phonographic Industry (BPI), respectively.

An accompanying music video was released in the summer of 2005, directed by Hype Williams. Throughout the video, pin-up girls and moving magazine covers appear alongside West and Foxx. It was nominated in multiple categories at 2006 MTV award shows, including Best Male Video and Favorite Video at the MTV Video Music Awards and MTV Asia Awards, respectively. West performed the song at the MTV Video Music Awards, Grammy Awards, Brit Awards and Saturday Night Live. In retrospect, West admitted he did not like "Gold Digger" and only made the song to earn money. It was covered live by the Automatic on numerous occasions, which included the 2006 Reading and Leeds Festivals. The song was covered by Will Schuester and New Directions for the second episode of Glee, "Showmance" (2009).

== Background and recording ==
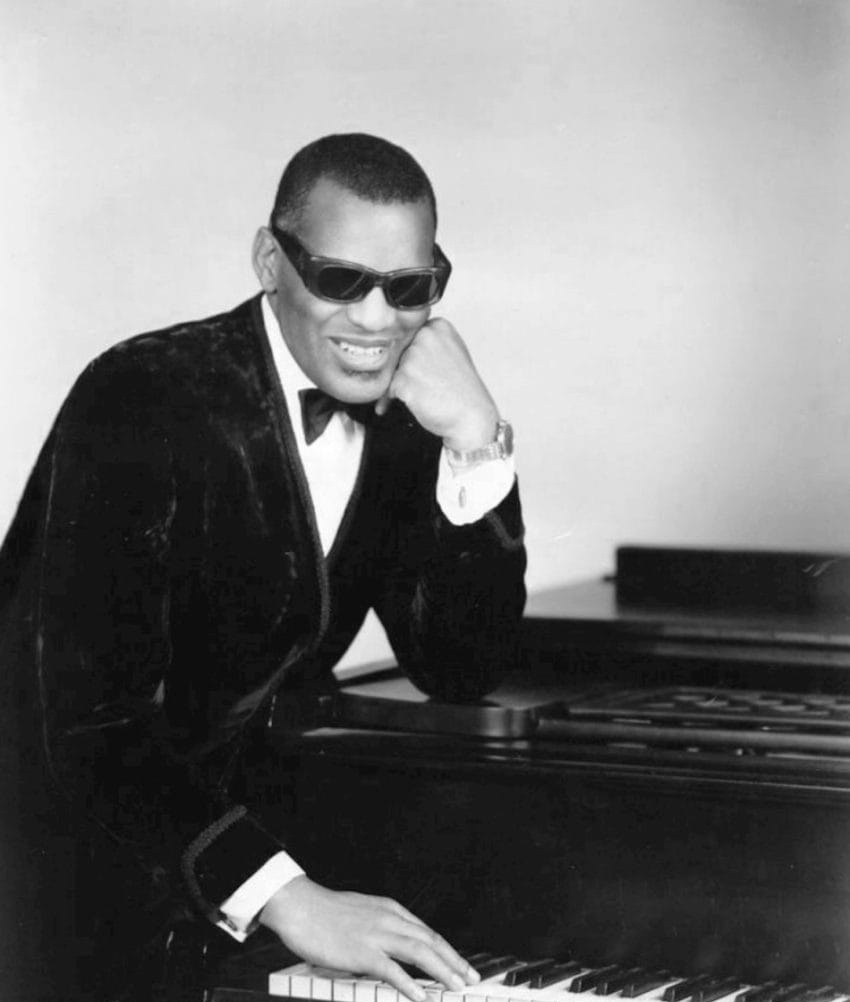
"Gold Digger" includes a sample of "I Got a Woman" by Ray Charles, as well as an interpolation from Jamie Foxx that was recorded due to uncertainty about the sample getting clearance.

West produced "Gold Digger" with record producer and composer Jon Brion. Brion had achieved fame from his distinctive production work for artists and film scores for auteurs, though was lacking experience in hip hop. West became a fan of singer-songwriter Fiona Apple for whom Brion had produced; while watching the 2004 film Eternal Sunshine of the Spotless Mind, he appreciated Brion's score. The pair became connected via their mutual friend Rick Rubin. West phoned Brion and chemistry instantly developed between the two. West enlisted him to work on Late Registration, marking Brion's first involvement in a hip hop project, with the decision creating confusion across his fanbase. Brion imagined people commenting that West has "gone off his rocker" and envisioning him making "an art record with some crazy, left-field music guy", clarifying this not to be "the case whatsoever". The producer recalled West taking charge of production with his strong vision and mentioned the rapper's "quick, intuitive decisions".

In late 2003, West previewed an early version of "Gold Digger" with singer John Legend in New York City (NYC). Many surmised that West conceived the song after watching Foxx's portrayal of Ray Charles in the 2004 biographical film Ray, contrary to how he actually created the beat at Ludacris' house in Atlanta, Georgia, before the film's creation had begun. West originally came up with the song for Shawnna's 2004 debut studio album Worth Tha Weight, though she passed it on to him; his A&R representative Plain Pat said her reasoning was unknown. The chorus was originally written by West from a female's point of view, until West wrote the first two verses for himself in 2004, the second of which was performed live by him early that year when touring for his debut album The College Dropout. West initially planned to re-use a verse from his unreleased track "Drop Dead Gorgeous" for the third verse, before penning a new verse shortly before the release of "Gold Digger". Plain Pat remembered the song's mastering location and regular studio being "right next to each other" at Sony Music Studios in NYC, saying that the team went "back and forth for a week" as they walked over to master content after it was recorded and the process ended when "we cut the final part".

During West's meeting with Canadian DJ A-Trak at Sasquatch! Music Festival, the rapper presented a rough version of the song to him. West felt the song was too "poppy" and sought out a style more akin to hip hop, to which A-Trak reacted by coming up with the idea of adding scratches, with confidence of what sample should be used. West reacted positively to the idea and it was mentioned when recording of the song would soon be finished in Los Angeles; the DJ recorded the scratches very late in the process, after the rapper flew him out to the county. After West watched Ray with his friend John Mayer, he thought of the idea to have Foxx sing an interpolation of Charles's "I Got a Woman" (1954) in place of the song's initial sample, in case it failed to be cleared. He recorded many takes; one version featured him singing from start to finish, but it was retracted since his vocals did not match properly with the instrumentation. The singer once recorded an explicit ad-lib, though he demanded for it not to be used. Brion composed some extra sounds for "Gold Digger" to finish the basic track during his first session with West, recalling that the rapper was clearly aware of what elements he liked and how he complied: "Great, we'll focus on those things." A sample of "I Got a Woman" was used for the final version, alongside Foxx's interpolation.

== Composition and lyrics ==
"Gold Digger"
A 20-second sample of "Gold Digger", featuring West calling for a prenup chant prior to performing the chorus. He is backed by a looped sample of Ray Charles's "I Got A Woman", as well as drums that echo "Get Em High" and handclaps.

Musically, "Gold Digger" is a bouncy pop rap song, having a basic sound in contrast to the majority of Late Registration. The song is built around a looped sample of "I Got a Woman", written by Renald Richard and its performer Ray Charles. "Gold Digger" prominently features handclaps and drums that recycle patterns from The College Dropout track "Get Em High". The song begins with Foxx's interpolation of "I Got a Woman"; he first sings the line "She takes my mon-eeee". It features scratches of a "get down" vocal that were contributed by A-Trak, appearing within the choruses. A synth coda is also included on the track, as well as additional vocals by Plain Pat and Don C.

In the lyrics of the song, West raps about being tricked by a woman. West spins the originally written hook "I'm not sayin' I'm a gold digger, but I ain't messin' with no broke niggas", rapping: "I ain't saying she's a gold digger/But she ain't messin' with no broke niggas!" He accompanies the scratches during the choruses, telling the girl in question to "go 'head, girl, go 'head, get down", as if playing along with her money-scheming games. West jokes about money-grabbing groupies on the song, as well as requesting for a prenup chant, saying “…we want prenup! Yeah, it’s something that you need to have, ‘cause when she leaves your ass, she’s gonna leave with half [of your income]”. Later on, West lets out the story of a black man that breaks up with a black woman for a white girl after becoming wealthy.

== Release ==
"Gold Digger" was released to US rhythmic contemporary radio stations as the second single from the album on July 5, 2005, through Roc-A-Fella and Def Jam. On August 2, a 12" vinyl was released for the song by Roc-A-Fella. "Gold Digger" was eventually included as the fourth track on West's second studio album Late Registration on August 30, 2005. On September 19, the song was released on a CD maxi single across Europe, through Roc-A-Fella. A CD was later issued for it in France on November 27, 2005, by Def Jam.

When released on the album, the song was made available for digital download. "Gold Digger" sold over 80,000 digital downloads through legal music services, such as iTunes and Napster, within a week. At the time, the song broke the record for the most digital downloads in one week and also scored the fastest download sales ever, feats that were both previously held by Gwen Stefani's "Hollaback Girl" (2005). It was the top selling song on iTunes in 2005 and the second best-selling digital single in the US with 1.1 million copies sold. In 2018, "Gold Digger" was streamed 21.2 million times in the United Kingdom, ranking as the most streamed song from 2005 in the country.

== Reception ==
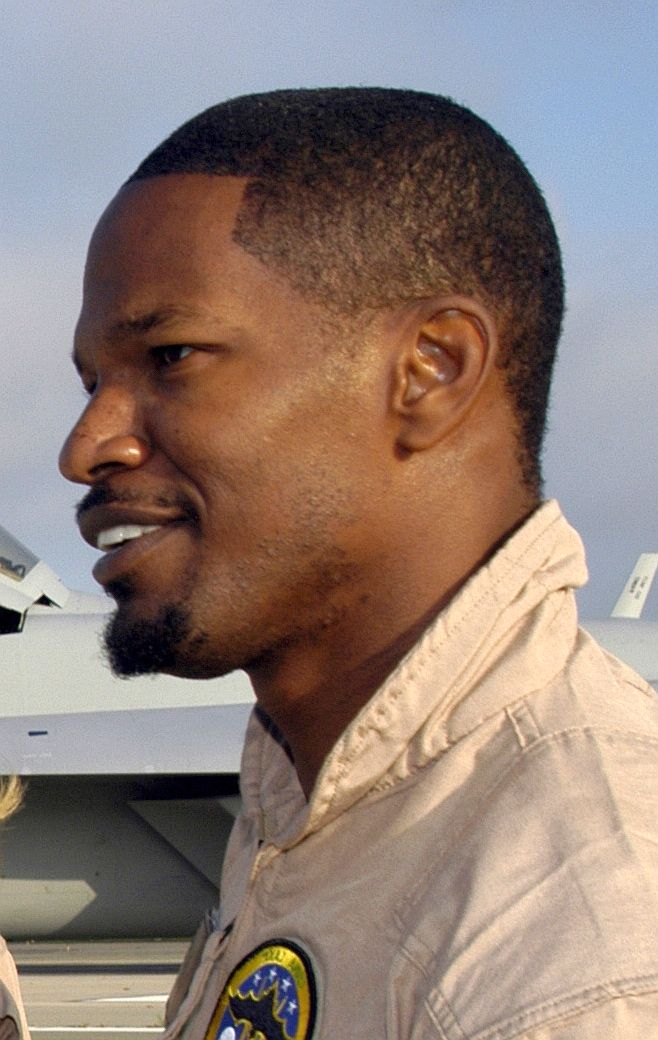
Several reviewers were fond of Foxx's vocals.

The song was met with widespread acclaim from music critics, mainly being praised for its composition. Jonah Weiner of Blender hailed "Gold Digger" as the album's best song, depicting it as letting out "the levels of talent separating West from that guy at the 7-Eleven". He noted how West crafted "a thumping beat" from handclaps and the Charles sample, over which he "jokes about greedy groupies". The Observer writer Kitty Empire saw the song as going against the elaborate style of most of Late Registration, saying it is "deliriously straight up and bouncy". Sean Fennessey of Pitchfork stated that the song is simple "but not subtle", delving strongly into obviousness with Foxx's interpolation of Charles and recycled drums, but "succeeding with humor and reverence". Writing for Uncut, Simon Reynolds commented that although he would have been fond of it sampling Shirley Bassey's "Goldfinger" (1964), the "Charles loop powers this gritty groove". Reynolds asserted that the beginning has "a faux-blues whinge" from Foxx, while West later observes with dry humor.

The Guardian critic Alexis Petridis observed that the song features "the odd sound" of Foxx's Oscar-winning impersonation of Charles, alongside the singer being sampled. USA Today's Steve Jones appreciated the song's humor, pointing out that West speaks of "women who will burn a hole in a man's pocket" beside the Charles sample that is accompanied by Foxx impersonating him. In Tiny Mix Tapes, Matty G vastly preferred the singer's interpolation of Charles to his past imitation of Al Green. At the Los Angeles Times, Robert Hilburn wrote that the song is self-explanatory and has a theme of "marvelous mischievousness", similarly to how Rolling Stone reviewer Rob Sheffield viewed West as using it to indulge his style of humor. Jon Pareles from The New York Times praised West's "cool arrogance" on the song, noticing him funnily commanding a chant. Azeem Ahmad voiced a less positive response in musicOMH, commenting that it "hits you with standard pigeon bashing" like a male version of girl group TLC's "No Scrubs" (1999), though affirmed the Charles sample provides "the feel of a rejuvenated Negro Spiritual song". Entertainment Weekly journalist David Browne saw an example of predictable paranoia from West in him "warning against a 'Gold Digger'" over a "taut, grunting beat" and a sample of Charles. Veteran critic Robert Christgau wrote for The Village Voice that the song is "marked by [a] cognitively dissonant" Foxx's interpolation of the work also sampled, while "misogynistic clichés" are laid on until "the oppressed black male" West defends suddenly abandons a non-gold digger for a white woman.

=== Copyright dispute ===
In April 2013, singer David Pryor's children Trena Steward and Lorenzo Pryor filed a copyright infringement lawsuit against West for allegedly sampling the "get down" chants from his band Thunder & Lightning's 1974 track "Bumpin' Bus Stop" on "Gold Digger" and also reciting the line on the chorus. The lawsuit reportedly acknowledged the song had been released back in 2005, though mentioned that David Pryor was in a convalescent hospital then with harsh mental and physical disabilities, such as senile dementia and prostate cancer. David possessing no knowledge of his voice having been exploited for commercial profit once he died in 2006 was also acknowledged, as well as how Steward and Lorenzo Pryor lacked the information to file the lawsuit until 2012. The two asked the judges to halt sales of the song, further requesting for "millions of dollars" in royalties. West and various record labels, including Roc-A-Fella and The Island Def Jam Music Group, were accused of being part of a 15-year "illegal copyright infringement scheme and criminal enterprise involving the unauthorized, willful sampling of plaintiffs original copyrighted music on a massive scale" in the lawsuit. In August 2014, California federal judge Beverly Reid O'Connell threw out the majority of the claims, insisting that distorted short samples meant the work would not easily be recognized.

== Accolades ==
In the 2005 edition of Shea Serrano's The Rap Year Book, "Gold Digger" was listed as the most important song of the year. Eye Weekly named the song the best single of 2005, with James Simons highlighting West's "good-natured humour and last-line admission of male guilt". He also said people seemed to be too excited by "the squawking Ray Charles sample and characteristic claps" to notice how rap's apparent savior "had just added to [its] overflowing Trifling Bitch Songbook", concluding that "when Kanye drops gold like this, everyone digs it". The song was voted in at number one on The Village Voice's Pazz & Jop poll for 2005, scoring 145 points. The results of a poll taken by Eye Weekly of critics across Canada that year chose it as the second best single, with 1,442 points. On a Rolling Stone readers' poll, the song was voted the third best single of 2005. Dagsavisen gave the song the same ranking for the year, while it was placed fourth on NME's list of the best tracks. On other lists of 2005's best singles, the song was ranked at number 10 by Zündfunk, number 12 by Playlouder, and number 14 by Stylus Magazine.

In the 2014 issue of XXL that celebrated 40 years of hip hop, the song was chosen as one of the five best singles of 2005. On Entertainment Weekly's list of the best single each year from 1990 to 2014, it was named the best of 2005. To celebrate their 16-year anniversary in 2016, NPR selected a favorite song from each year since they started, picking "Gold Digger" for 2005. In 2008, the track was ranked at number 20 on VH1's list of the greatest hip hop songs ever. The track was selected as the sixth best song of the 2000s decade by the network, while Rolling Stone picked it as the decade's 29th best. "Gold Digger" was placed at numbers 34 and 40 on respective lists of the best songs of the 2000s by Slant Magazine and NME.

In 2018, Rolling Stone named the song the 36th greatest of the 21st century. Highsnobiety ranked it as West's fifth best song two years later; Bianca said his "innate musical knowledge" is demonstrated via Foxx's interpolation of Charles's work and "a surprise synth-coda" that appears to nod to Stevie Wonder's "Superstition" (1972). In 2014, NME listed the track as the 93rd greatest song of all time, while it was also hailed as one of the greatest of all time by Time in 2011. "Gold Digger" is included in the 2015 version of Robert Dimery's book 1001 Songs You Must Hear Before You Die. The song won Best Rap Solo Performance at the 2006 Grammy Awards, standing as one of West's three wins there. At the same ceremony, the song received a nomination for Record of the Year, an award it ultimately lost to Dixie Chicks's "Not Ready to Make Nice". In 2006, the song was awarded Best Collaboration and Hot Rap Track at the BET Awards and Billboard R&B/Hip-Hop Awards, respectively.

Awards and nominations for "Gold Digger"
Year	Organization	Award	Result	Ref.
2005	Kiss Awards	Most Wanted Download	Nominated	
2005	Vibe Awards	Coolest Collabo	Nominated	
2006	BET Awards	Best Collaboration	Won	
2006	Billboard R&B/Hip-Hop Awards	Hot R&B/Hip-Hop Song	Nominated	
2006	Billboard R&B/Hip-Hop Awards	Hot Rap Track	Won	
2006	BMI R&B/Hip-Hop Awards	Award Winning Songs	Won	
2006	Grammy Awards	Best Rap Solo Performance	Won	
2006	Grammy Awards	Record of the Year	Nominated	
2006	International Dance Music Awards	Best Rap/Hip Hop Dance Track	Won	
2006	MP3.com Awards	Best Single	Won	
2006	MTV Australia Video Music Awards	Song of the Year	Nominated	
2006	MTV Video Music Awards	Ringtone of the Year	Nominated	
2006	Soul Train Music Awards	Best R&B/Soul or Rap Dance Cut	Nominated	
2006	TEC Awards	Record Production/Single or Track	Nominated	
2007	BMI Pop Awards	Award Winning Songs	Won	

== Music video ==
An accompanying music video debuted in the summer of 2005. It was directed by frequent West collaborator Hype Williams, who also directed the visual for his previous Late Registration single "Diamonds from Sierra Leone". The video was the first of West's to feature cameos from signees to his record label GOOD Music; they further made appearances on his albums and at his shows. It was released to YouTube on June 16, 2009.

Shot in a widescreen letterboxed format and using lighting, the music video begins with a cameo from Foxx and includes prominent appearances from pin-up girls. Fictional moving magazine covers that feature video vixens are also present throughout, interspersed with various colors and scenes of West dancing. GOOD Music artists Consequence and John Legend are both charmed by women that move easily; the former spends his time with one in a dark room. A woman that appears alongside West at points is also show in some shots on her own, during which she acts angrily and holds a bright light that she shakes heavily towards the end.

On a 2018 list of the best music video from each year since 2000, ShortList named the visual the best of 2005, with Niloufar Haidari saying that it "is a joy to watch" because of Foxx's presence and the "exceptional use of colour and lighting". That same year, Complex named the clip as West's 20th best music video. The staff of the magazine praised West's "dance moves" and his "bold color choices", concluding by labeling the video "a perfect match" for "Gold Digger". The music video won the BET Award for Video of the Year at the 2006 BET Awards, and received nominations for both Best Male Video and Best Hip Hop Video at the 2006 MTV Video Music Awards. The visual was nominated for Favorite Video at the MTV Asia Awards 2006, alongside garnering nominations for the awards of Best Male Video and Best Hip-Hop Video at the MTV Australia Video Music Awards 2006; it was also nominated in the latter category at the 2006 MTV Video Music Awards Japan. Also in 2006, the video received a nomination for the solo Best International Video award at the MuchMusic Video Awards, while it was presented with the Michael Jackson award for Best R&B/Soul or Rap Music Video at the Soul Train Music Awards.

The music video on YouTube has received over 355 million views as of May 2024.

== Commercial performance ==
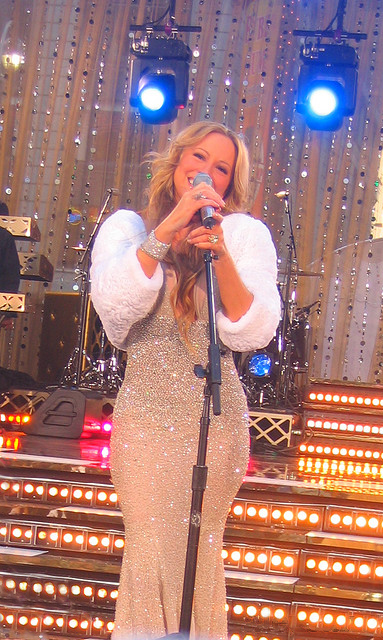
"Gold Digger" knocked Mariah Carey's "We Belong Together" off the top spot of the US Billboard Hot 100, though it stood behind the latter as the second longest number-one single of 2005.

"Gold Digger" debuted at number 92 on the US Billboard Hot 100 for the issue dated July 30, 2005, before reaching number 19 over a month later. The song then leapt 18 places to top the Hot 100 and end the 14-week number one reign of singer Mariah Carey's "We Belong Together", while blocking her single "Shake It Off" directly from the summit. "Gold Digger" amassed over 80,500 downloads and experienced the largest radio airplay gain for that week, as well as giving West his first number-one single as a lead artist and Foxx his second on the Hot 100. The song spent 10 consecutive weeks atop the Hot 100, standing as one of the longest reigns in the chart's history as of 2025. This also made the song the second longest number-one of 2005, behind "We Belong Together", and it was dethroned by Chris Brown's single "Run It!". For the year, "Gold Digger" ranked as the sixth most popular song on the Hot 100. By 2009, the song stood as the chart's third biggest hit that was released by The Island Def Jam Music Group. On the decade-end chart for the 2000s, it ranked as the ninth most popular song on the Hot 100. As of May 31, 2018, the song is West's largest hit of all time on the Hot 100, while it stands as the 70th biggest hit across the chart's 65-year history up to that year.

The song entered the US Hot R&B/Hip-Hop Songs chart at number 53 for the issue date of July 16, 2005, while it later went on to reach number three around two months later. The same week as topping the Hot 100, the song rose to number two on the US Hot R&B/Hip-Hop Songs chart. The following week, "Gold Digger" peaked at number one on the chart, a position it spent four weeks at. Simultaneously with its Hot 100 peak, the song shot up from number 94 to the second position on the US Pop 100, setting a record for the chart's largest jump ever. A week later, it peaked at number one on the Pop 100, holding on to this position for 10 weeks. The song also topped the US Hot Rap Songs, Mainstream Top 40, and Rhythmic charts, marking West's first number-one on the second chart. In June 2010, the song was reported to have scored the fifth highest radio audience ever in the United States, with 175.6 million impressions for the week of October 22, 2005. By May 2011, it had sold 3,083,000 copies in the US, standing as West's third song to pass 3 million sales in the country. On September 23, 2020, "Gold Digger" was awarded an octuple platinum certification by the Recording Industry Association of America (RIAA) for pushing 8,000,000 certified units in the US, ranking among the best-selling digital singles in the country by certification.

In Australia, the song debuted at number two on the ARIA Singles Chart. A week later, it rose to the chart's summit, giving West his first number-one single in Australia and spending three weeks at the position. On December 3, 2015, "Gold Digger" was certified quadruple platinum by the Australian Recording Industry Association (ARIA) for shipments of 280,000 copies in Australia. The song entered the NZ Singles Chart at number 34 for the issue date of October 24, 2005. It leapt 29 places to number five the next week, hitting number one shortly later on the chart issued November 14, marking West's first single to reach this position in New Zealand and remaining there for one more week. In the song's 22nd and final week on the chart, it was certified gold by Recorded Music NZ (RMNZ) for selling over 7,500 units in the region. By 2024, it was certified 6× platinum.

The song debuted and peaked at number two on the UK Singles Chart, which it lasted for 75 weeks on. As of April 2017, the song stands as the 22nd biggest hip-hop hit of all time in the UK. It ranks as West's most successful song ever on the UK Singles Chart up to October 2019, despite "Stronger" (2007) having charted higher. On May 10, 2024, "Gold Digger" was certified quadruple platinum by the British Phonographic Industry (BPI) for shelving 2,400,000 units in the UK. Similarly to its UK peak position, the song reached number three on both the Irish Singles Chart and Scottish Singles Chart. It was less successful in Norway and the Netherlands, peaking at numbers 14 and 20 on the Topp 20 Singles and Dutch Top 40 charts, respectively. The song also hit the top 50 in Sweden, Germany, and Austria. On March 6, 2024, "Gold Digger" received a double platinum certification from IFPI Danmark for 180,000 shipments in Denmark. As of 2021, it is West's biggest song on Billboard and UK Singles chart.

== Live performances ==
West first performed an early sparse version of the track at the 2nd Annual Dynamic Producer Conference in NYC during late 2003, backed by piano from John Legend, who also sang the chorus. West's stage attire included a Reese's Peanut Butter Cups T-shirt, a red hat, and a rucksack. He initiated a call and response during the performance, directly asking the crowd to say "Ohhhhhhh oh". West and Foxx performed the song at the 2005 MTV Video Music Awards, also dancing on a spinning floor. The rapper commanded the crowd's attention and when he delivered the prenup lyric, money rained over them. West delivered a performance of the song atop a glass riser in the center of the crowd at the 2005 VH1 Hip Hop Honors, for which he wore a sweater and did his backwards dance. He transitioned from performing a melody of it with backing by A-Trak into fellow album track "Touch the Sky" for the premiere of season 31 of Saturday Night Live on October 1, 2005, accompanied by a mini-orchestra.

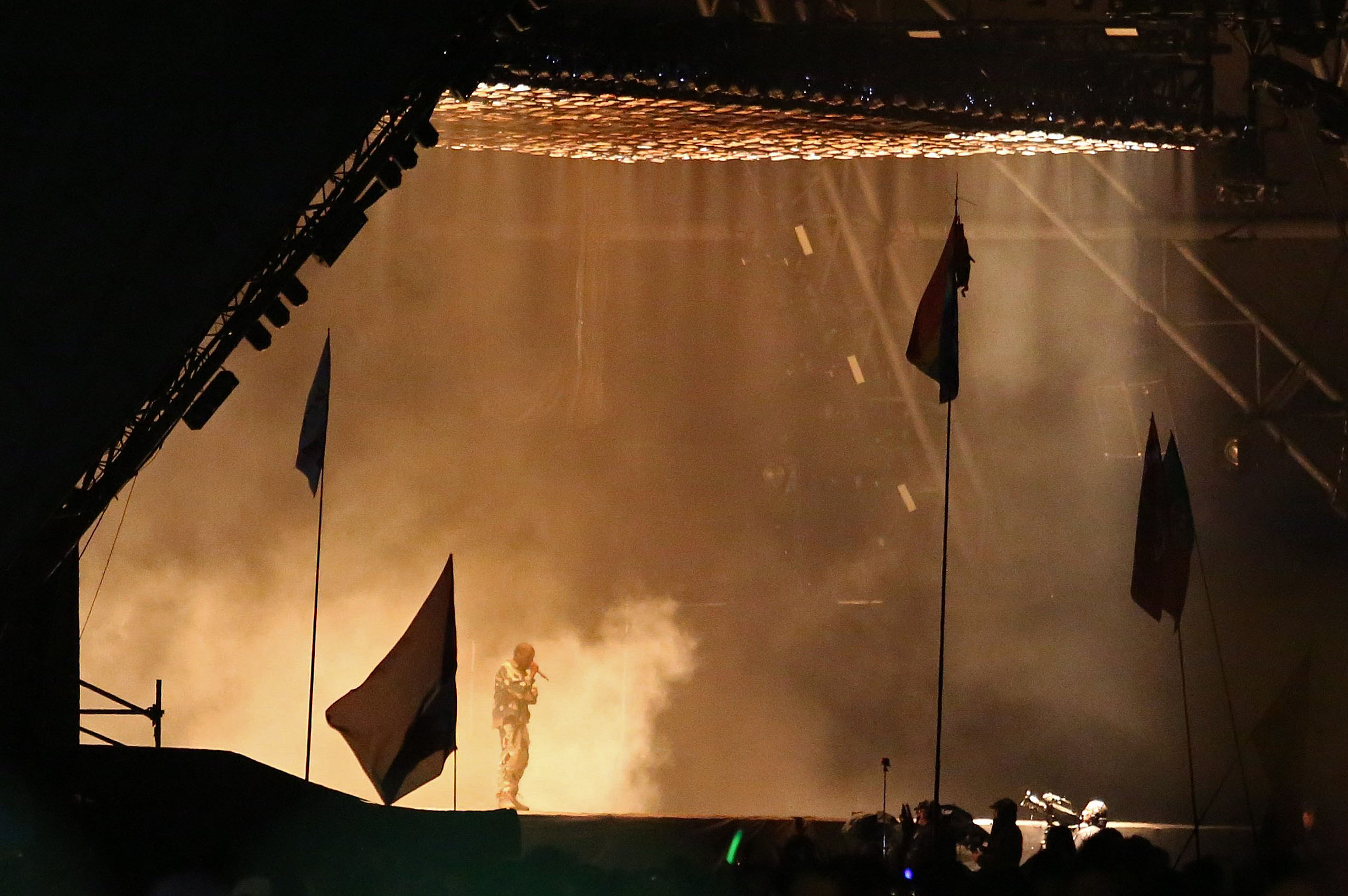
At Glastonbury in 2015, West's encore included a performance of the song, which he introduced by proclaiming himself "the greatest living rock star on the planet!"

At the 2006 Grammys, West, Foxx, and a marching band performed "Gold Digger". The band marched through the audience and Foxx created excitement, before West made his entrance with a shako on as he carried a baton. West performed a medley of the song, "Diamonds from Sierra Leone", and "Touch the Sky" at the 2006 Brit Awards, marking his debut as a performer at the ceremony. While performing, West was backed by 77 dancers covered in gold spray paint. At the 2010 Brit Awards, the performance of "Gold Digger" was nominated for best Brits performance of 30 years. West delivered a performance of it for AOL Sessions, which was included on his 2006 live album Late Orchestration. He performed the track at the 2006 Coachella Festival, introducing it by alluding to the profanity: "White people, this is your only chance to say [the N-word]." On July 1, 2007, West performed the track as the opening number of his set for part 3 of Princess Diana memorial event Concert for Diana at Wembley Stadium, London. A week later, West performed it during the Live Earth concert at Giants Stadium in East Rutherford, New Jersey. West and Foxx performed the track for a pre-2007 MTV Music Video Awards show at The Joint in Hard Rock Hotel and Casino, Las Vegas. During the performance, the singer gestured towards West and said: "The best MC in the mother fucking [sic] game." West performed "Gold Digger" at the 2009 Wireless Festival at Hyde Park in London and introduced the track by calling it "the story of my life", rocking his customary aviator shades and black suit jacket for his appearance. He was present on an elevated section of the stage, accompanied by four topless dancers that wore tiaras and body paint.

For his headlining set at the 2011 Coachella Festival, West performed the track. West delivered an abbreviated version of it for a medley of over 10 songs at 12-12-12: The Concert for Sandy Relief in Madison Square Garden, New York City on December 12, 2012, rocking a Pyrex hoodie and leather kilt while performing. On June 20, 2014, West made an unannounced appearance for Dave Chappelle's comedy show at Radio City Music Hall in Midtown Manhattan, New York City, which included a performance of the track. He stopped three quarters of the way into the track, jumping off the stage and leaving the hall. West performed it at the Time 100 Gala as he walked amongst the crowd and interacted with them, giving a fan the microphone at one point. After a pause in his headlining set at the 2015 Glastonbury Festival, West performed the track for an encore. To introduce it, West made a declaration for the night of the festival that may not be possible for him to say 20–40 years later: "You are now watching the greatest living rock star on the planet!" West performed it at the 2015 Pan American Games, omitting any usage of the N-word. On December 10, 2021, West performed the track with an alternate chorus that removed any profanity during a benefit concert with Drake at the Los Angeles Memorial Coliseum for Larry Hoover's jail sentence.

== Cover versions and appearances in media ==
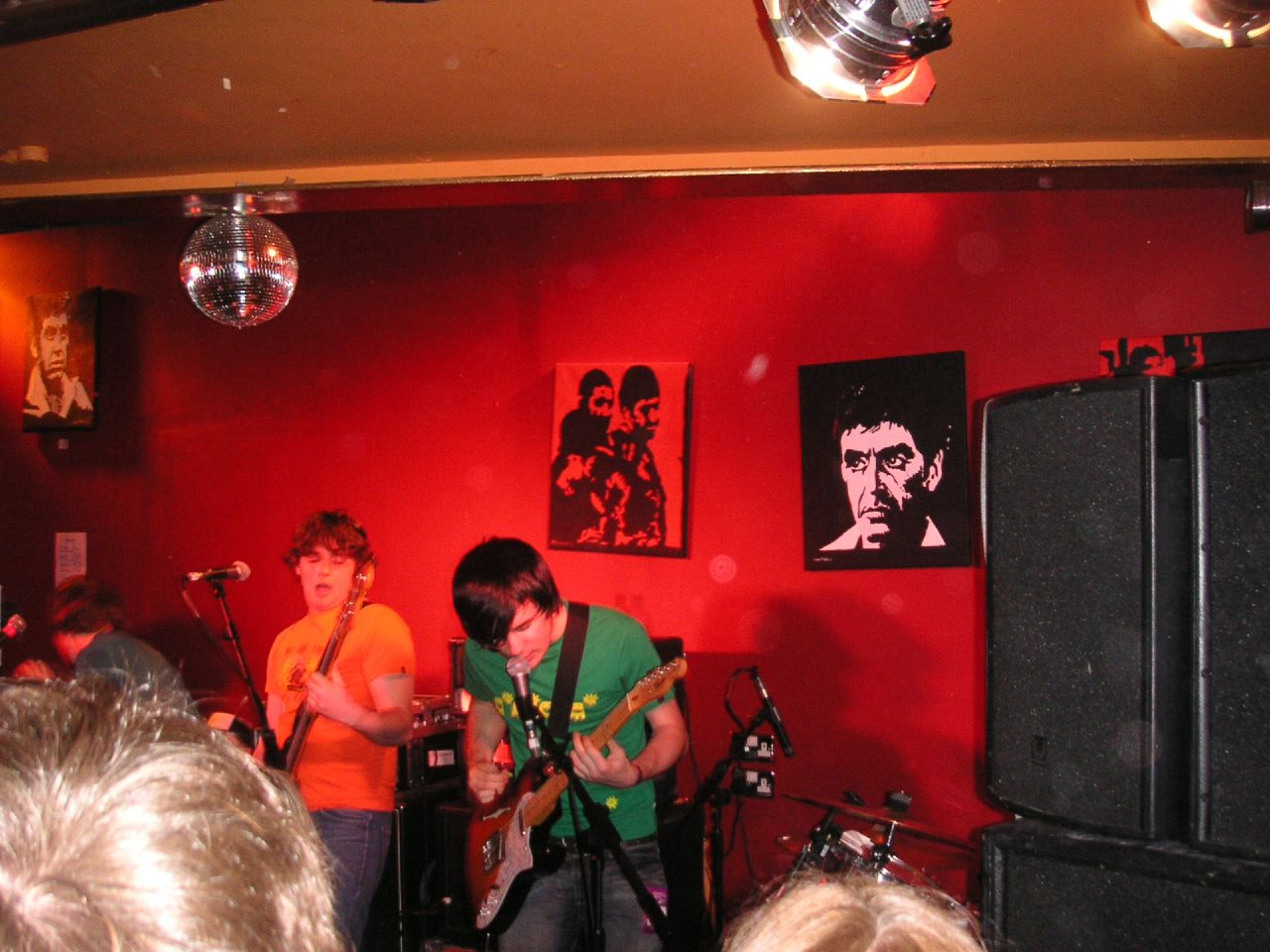
The song was covered by the Automatic at multiple concerts, including one at the University of London Union.

On July 24, 2006, Welsh rock band the Automatic performed a cover of "Gold Digger" at the University of London Union, London. Keyboardist Alex Pennie delivered the vocals, whereas support band Viva Machine were wrapped in bandages and body–popped into the mosh pit. On August 29, 2006, the Automatic, Capdown, Adequate Seven, and GLC performed the cover at the Reading Festival. In September, it was reported that the band were awaiting permission to include the cover as the B-side to a single. During the first US headlining show of the Automatic's Not Accepted Anywhere album tour at Bowery Ballroom in New York City on July 26, 2007, they performed the cover in a punk style. Pennie returned for the performance after being absent for two songs, shouting the vocals. At the 2007 Get Loaded in the Park festival, the band performed the cover with English musician Newton Faulkner, who contributed vocals and percussive guitar. That same year, a limited edition 7" vinyl was released across the UK for their single "Raoul", featuring a performance of "Gold Digger" from the 2006 Leeds Festival as the B-side. In 2009, characters Will Schuester and New Directions covered the song for American TV series Glee's second episode "Showmance". The cover was released on the soundtrack album Glee: The Music, Volume 1 on November 3 of that year, and it reached number 59 on the ARIA Singles Chart.

On October 13, 2012, English singer-songwriter Lucy Spraggan covered "Gold Digger" for week two of series 9 of The X Factor, introducing it by recalling her grandmother's death and the family reaction, admitting her own week was bad. According to Spraggan, she covered an upbeat number so people would stop feeling sorry for her after her grandmother's death. Spraggan added guitar for the cover and hip hop models accompanied her, while she was surrounded by mock gold rain. Once the singer finished performing, she opened up to show presenter Dermot O'Leary: "I just wanted people to have a dance and be happy, because I want to be happy too." On September 24, 2015, the second season of American TV series Black-ish premiered with the episode "THE Word", featuring character Jack Johnson covering the song for a school talent show. He delivered the hook with the N-word kept, leading to outrage from the audience and him ultimately being suspended. On November 21, 2015, Thomas Rhett and Brett Eldredge performed a medley of covers as an encore at Kansas City, Missouri, for their co-headlining CMT on Tour: Suits and Boots, which included a country–styled version of "Gold Digger".

In September 2005, hip hop duo the Legendary K.O. released a song titled "George Bush Doesn't Care About Black People" after West's quote that is also sampled. It uses the beat from "Gold Digger", while West and Foxx's vocals are mashed up with the duo's lyrics. The chorus rephrases that of the song: "George Bush ain't a gold digger, but he ain't messin' with no broke niggas." Erykah Badu's 2010 single "Turn Me Away (Get MuNNY)" concludes with her muttering the song's hook in the style of a boast, "I ain't messing with no broke nigger." Speaking to BBC Radio 1's Zane Lowe in 2013, West admitted that he "never really" liked "Gold Digger", but knew the song would earn him money.

The song plays at the end and over the credits of the It's Always Sunny in Philadelphia episode "2020: A Year in Review," as the Rudy Giuliani hair dye incident, the January 6 attack, and the "Stop the Steal" riots are shown to be results of the main protagonists' actions, and as it is revealed that they all voted for West in the Presidential election.

== Track listing ==
European CD maxi single

1. "Gold Digger" – 3:29 (Note: The CD maxi release is one second longer than the album version.)
2. "Diamonds from Sierra Leone" – 3:35
3. "We Can Make It Better" – 3:52

== Credits and personnel ==
Information taken from Late Registration liner notes.

=== Recording locations ===
- Recorded at The Record Plant (Hollywood, CA), Sony Music Studios (NYC), Chalice Recording Studios (Hollywood, CA) and Grandmaster Recording Studios (Hollywood, CA)
- Mixed at Chalice Recording Studios (Hollywood, CA)

=== Personnel ===
- Kanye West – songwriter, producer
- Ray Charles – songwriter
- Renald Richard – songwriter
- Jon Brion – producer
- Anthony Kilhoffer – recorder
- Andrew Dawson – recorder
- Tom Biller – recorder
- Mike Dean – mix engineer
- Richard Reitz – assistant engineer
- Matt Green – assistant engineer
- Nate Connelly – assistant engineer
- Mike Mo – assistant engineer
- Plain Pat – additional vocals
- Don C – additional vocals
- A-Trak – scratches

== Charts ==
=== Weekly charts ===
Chart performance for "Gold Digger"
Chart (2005–2006)	Peak position
Australia (ARIA)	1
Australian Urban (ARIA)	1
Austria (Ö3 Austria Top 40)	47
Belgium (Ultratip Bubbling Under Flanders)	4
Belgium (Ultratip Bubbling Under Wallonia)	14
Canada (Nielsen SoundScan)	5
Canada CHR/Pop Top 30 (Radio & Records)	1
Euro Digital Tracks (Billboard)	2
France (SNEP)	71
Germany (GfK)	35
Ireland (IRMA)	3
Netherlands (Dutch Top 40)	20
Netherlands (Single Top 100)	22
New Zealand (Recorded Music NZ)	1
Norway (VG-lista)	14
Scottish Singles Sales (Official Charts)	3
Sweden (Sverigetopplistan)	34
Switzerland (Schweizer Hitparade)	52
UK Singles (Official Charts)	2
UK Hip Hop/R&B (Official Charts)	2
US Billboard Hot 100	1
US Hot R&B/Hip-Hop Songs (Billboard)	1
US Hot Rap Songs (Billboard)	1
US Pop Airplay (Billboard)	1
US Pop 100 (Billboard)	1
US Rhythmic Airplay (Billboard)	1

=== Year-end charts ===
2005 year-end chart performance for "Gold Digger"
Chart (2005)	Position
Australia (ARIA)	33
New Zealand (Recorded Music NZ)	20
UK Singles (OCC)	35
UK Urban (Music Week)	12
US Billboard Hot 100	6
US Hot R&B/Hip-Hop Songs (Billboard)	14
US Pop 100 (Billboard)	16
US Rhythmic (Billboard)	16

2006 year-end chart performance for "Gold Digger"
Chart (2006)	Position
UK Singles (OCC)	110
US Billboard Hot 100	34

2007 year-end chart performance for "Gold Digger"
Chart (2007)	Position
UK Singles (OCC)	175

=== Decade-end charts ===
2009 decade-end chart performance for "Gold Digger"
Chart (2000–2009)	Position
US Billboard Hot 100	9

=== All-time charts ===
2021 all-time chart performance for "Gold Digger"
Chart (1958–2021)	Position
US Billboard Hot 100	70

== Certifications ==
Certifications and sales for "Gold Digger"
Region	Certification	Certified units/sales
Australia (ARIA)	4× Platinum	280,000^{‡}
Brazil (Pro-Música Brasil)	Gold	30,000^{‡}
Denmark (IFPI Danmark)	2× Platinum	180,000^{‡}
Germany (BVMI)	Gold	150,000^{‡}
Italy (FIMI)	Gold	25,000^{‡}
New Zealand (RMNZ)	6× Platinum	180,000^{‡}
United Kingdom (BPI)	4× Platinum	1,770,000
United States (RIAA)	13× Platinum	13,000,000^{‡}
^{‡} Sales+streaming figures based on certification alone.

== Release history ==
Release dates and formats for "Gold Digger"
Region	Date	Format	Label(s)	Ref.
United States	July 5, 2005	Rhythmic contemporary radio	Roc-A-Fella; Def Jam	
Various	August 2, 2005	12" vinyl	Roc-A-Fella	
United States	September 13, 2005	Contemporary hit radio	Roc-A-Fella; Def Jam	
Europe	September 19, 2005	CD maxi single	Roc-A-Fella	
France	November 27, 2005	CD single	Def Jam	

== See also ==
- List of best-selling singles
- List of best-selling singles in the United States
- List of number-one singles of 2005 (Australia)
- List of number-one singles from the 2000s (New Zealand)
- List of UK R&B Singles Chart number ones of 2005
- List of UK top-ten singles in 2005
- List of Billboard Hot 100 number-one singles of 2005

== Notes and references ==
Notes

Citations
