= Acid Reflex =

Studio album by Paris
- Released: October 28, 2008
- Recorded: 2008
- Genre: Political hip hop, G-funk
- Label: Guerrilla Funk Recordings
- Producer: Paris

Paris chronology
Paris Presents: Hard Truth Soldiers (2006)	Acid Reflex (2008)	Pistol Politics (2015)

Professional ratings
Review scores
Source	Rating
Allmusic	3.5/5 stars
RapReviews.com	8.5/10 stars

Acid Reflex is the sixth studio album by rapper Paris. It included the single and video "Don't Stop the Movement" to promote the album. Acid Reflex features guest appearances from Public Enemy, George Clinton and T-K.A.S.H. Recorded and mixed at Data Stream Studio in San Francisco, CA and Guerrilla Funk Sound in Danville, CA.

== Reviews ==
Partial Reviews:

"...4 out of 5 Stars...PARIS' latest offering, Acid Reflex, is pure hard-hitting Bay Area funk hop, with poignant lyrics that serve for great listening and cater to California car culture. Acid Reflex bumps like any great gangsta album, without being ignorant or celebratory of wanton violence for entertainment. Addressing so many societal ills would seem like a daunting task for most MCs, but to PARIS this is regular dialog...PARIS cleverly weaves a tale about how oppression beats down the moral compass of inner city Blacks and breeds apathy that has now become ghetto chic...Acid Reflex is PARIS at his best - the music and lyrics are just impeccable. The best gangsta album that is not gangsta. An album for the people with a clear moral line and standards of excellence." - Murder Dog Magazine

"Strongly agree or strongly disagree, it's brilliantly constructed...the words are all top-notch and will have fans starving for material declaring the album a triumph..." - Allmusic.com

"Listening to Paris in 2008 is like walking on the edge of a razor blade. On one side of that slippery slope, the East Bay militant rap icon continues to espouse the anger and violent revolutionary tendencies he's famous for. On the other, as evident on his new album Acid Reflex, his music grooves and swirls and lifts...You'll get caught up in the pumping beat, the Funk, and suddenly realize you're singing along to Real revolution, actual solution...Paris is never less than deft in his wordplay or charismatic in his storytelling, twisting even the expected socio-political discourse into something captivating...you can count on him to step up and speak on the hard truth, especially, like now, when it needs to be said. Only now, the Hard Truth is accompanied by an equally Hard Party. Get out and dance and join the revolution." - East Bay Express

"4 out of 5 stars...from the majestic rally calls on "Don't Stop The Movement" to the sticky-wet percussion on "Winter In America"...his ability to collaborate with testosterone-summoning beats, all the while promoting respect for women and a more accurate portrayal of African Americans in the media is a refreshing duality which could only come out of the Yay." - Urb

== Track listing ==
No.	Title	Length
1.	"Don't Stop the Movement"	4:53
2.	"So What"	3:47
3.	"Blap That Ass Up"	4:41
4.	"The Trap"	5:43
5.	"Get Fired Up"	3:53
6.	"Neighborhood Watch"	3:29
7.	"Acid Reflex"	4:53
8.	"True"	3:35
9.	"The Violence of the Lambs"	2:27
10.	"Winter in America"	4:12
11.	"The Hustle"	4:43
12.	"Rebels Without Applause"	3:48
13.	"One Gun"	4:15
14.	"Harambe"	1:55
15.	"Don't Stop the Movement" ([Version][Warrior Dance Mix])	10:11
Total length:		57:59
