= The Devil Made Me Do It =

Studio album by Paris
- Released: October 9, 1990
- Recorded: Fall 1989 – Summer 1990
- Genre: Political hip hop
- Label: Scarface/Tommy Boy
- Producer: Paris; D.R.

Paris chronology
The Devil Made Me Do It (1990)	Sleeping with the Enemy (1992)

The Devil Made Me Do It is the debut album by the American rapper Paris. It was released on October 9, 1990, on Tommy Boy Records. Paris toured the US and Europe that year to promote the record. The album eventually sold over 300,000 copies according to the emcee.

== Release ==
The title track was banned on MTV. Some record stores refused to carry a version of the album, due to a cover image of a police officer putting a young Black male in a chokehold.

== Critical reception ==
Professional ratings
Review scores
Source	Rating
AllMusic	4.5/5 stars
The Encyclopedia of Popular Music	4/5 stars
The Source	3/5 stars

"Menacing...the vocals intensify and get hyper, creating a heightened sense of anxiety...his lyrics are intense and he drops science while showing skills on the mic..." - The Source

"Rap music reaches new heights of political invective on Paris' jolting debut recording...Paris boosts his message with unique, sleek music...adding a primal beast-on-the-hunt quality..." - People

"Hard-hitting beats combined with razor-sharp lyrics...Listen to the rhymes flow, and you'll realize that Paris is a massive, militant talent..." - Hip Hop Connection

"Paris motivates with an authoritative voice that speaks to the underground rather than trying to pacify the masses." - CMJ

"Easily the outstanding rap debut of 1990...a case study in how it should be done...this album profoundly understands the musical strategies of dissonance, atmosphere, space...Paris possesses one of those menacing voices that draws you into its husky world, via a timbre that carries the meaning within itself. In rap, the message is in the medium, and the medium is in the grain of the voice." - Express

"More than just a rap album - it's a revolutionary handbook. Music for those who want mental stimulation with their dope beats." - Urb

"An impressive debut with street smart, political, well-done raps...a strong, strong record." - Billboard

"Paris is a force of gravity under which perpetrators melt of embarrassment...his musical genius is rhyme...Paris is a gun to your head, so listen up." - Vox

Trouser Press praised the "diverse, imaginative and burningly intense self-produced tracks."

== Track listing ==
1. "Intro" – 0:40
2. "Scarface Groove" – 4:35
3. "This Is a Test" – 2:47
4. "Panther Power" – 3:58
5. "Break the Grip of Shame" 3:34
6. "Warning" – 1:07
7. "Ebony" – 3:56
8. "Brutal" – 3:53
9. "On the Prowl" – 1:10
10. "The Devil Made Me Do It" – 4:12
11. "The Hate That Hate Made" – 1:09
12. "Mellow Madness" – 4:50
13. "I Call Him Mad" – 4:17
14. "Escape from Babylon" – 5:18
15. "Wretched" – 3:32
16. "Break the Grip of Shame (The Final Call)" (Bonus track) – 8:06
17. "Devil Made Me Do It (Poach a Pig Mix)" (Bonus track) – 5:44

== Charts ==
=== Weekly charts ===
Album Charting	Billboard 200	R&B/Hip-Hop Albums
The Devil Made Me Do It	158	41

=== Singles ===
Single	Chart	Position
"The Devil Made Me Do It"	Hot Rap Singles	20
