= Don C =

American fashion designer

Don Crawley, known professionally as Don C, is an American luxury streetwear designer from Chicago, Illinois.

== Career ==
Crawley was previously the manager of Kanye West, and an executive at Kanye West's G.O.O.D. Music label.

In 2011, Crawley founded streetwear and sports apparel brand Just Don. He also owned luxury clothing store chain RSVP Gallery with Virgil Abloh.

Crawley first collaborated with Jordan in January 2015, redesigning the Jordan 2 with a blue quilted design. In May 2017, he created a Jordan 2 in Arctic Orange exclusively for women, children, and babies with the theme "Family First". He eventually released a men's shoe as well.

In 2018, Crawley collaborated with LVMH's Rémy Martin brand with "Just Rémy - The Rémy Martin 1738 Limited Edition".

Crawley is known for his designing of NBA, NHL and MLS hats, popular among celebrities such as Jay-Z. In February 2022, Crawley was named Creative Strategy and Design Advisor for the Chicago Bulls.

In 2023, Crawley was appointed Creative Director of Mitchell & Ness.

Crawley has been mentioned in multiple Kanye West songs, including "Erase Me" (Kid Cudi), "Keep My Spirit Alive", "I Am A God" and "Facts".

== Personal life ==
Crawley is of Louisiana Creole descent.

In 2008, Crawley and Kanye West were arrested for getting into an altercation with paparazzi at LAX. Charged with vandalism, grand theft and battery, both were ultimately sentenced to 50 hours of community service.
