= Sonic Jihad (Paris album) =

Studio album by Paris
- Released: October 7, 2003
- Recorded: 2003
- Genre: Political hip hop, hardcore hip hop
- Label: Guerrilla Funk
- Producer: Paris

Paris chronology
Unleashed (1998)	Sonic Jihad (2003)	Rebirth of a Nation (2006)

Professional ratings
Review scores
Source	Rating
AllMusic	3/5 stars
The Austin Chronicle	4/5 stars
The Encyclopedia of Popular Music	3/5 stars
RapReviews	9/10

Sonic Jihad is a studio album by rapper Paris, released in 2003. It was recorded, mixed, and mastered at Data Stream Studio, San Francisco. The album was marketed by Guerrilla Funk, Paris's label, as "so dangerous to homeland security [that] it's unavailable at chain stores."

== Production ==
Sonic Jihad was produced solely by Paris. Paris claimed that he recorded the album after a track he posted for free in 2002, "What Would You Do?," was downloaded hundreds of thousands of times. Public Enemy appear on ""Freedom"; Paris would collaborate with the group three years later on Rebirth of a Nation.

== Critical reception ==
The Austin Chronicle called the album a "jolting wake-up call for those still cognizant enough to read between the lines of repression," writing that "with classic G-funk sensibilities guiding its head-on course, Sonic Jihad encapsulates an entire decade of firebrand rap." Exclaim! wrote that Paris's lyrics are delivered in a "stoic, commandeering rasp [that] uncompromisingly deconstructs neoconservative politics, identifies the media outlets as 'agents of repression' and targets materialistic hip-hop for turning its back on the issues he addresses."

== Battlefield 2 incident ==
In 2006, a fan of the video game Battlefield 2, referring to himself as "SonicJihad" after Paris's album, posted a montage of clips from the game, edited with audio excerpts from the movie Team America: World Police and other sources. The video was viewed with alarm by members of the United States House Permanent Select Committee on Intelligence, which held an open hearing on May 4, 2006, titled "Terrorist Use of the Internet." News reports suggested that the video was an example of efforts by al Qaeda and other groups to recruit young people.

== Track listing ==
1. "Ave Bushani"
2. "Field Nigga Boogie"
3. "Sheep to the Slaughter"
4. "Split Milk" (featuring Capleton)
5. "Tear Shit up" (featuring Dead Prez)
6. "Freedom" (featuring Dead Prez)
7. "Ain't No Love" (featuring Kam)
8. "Lay Low"
9. "Life Goes On"
10. "You Know My Name"
11. "Evil"
12. "AWOL"
13. "Agents of Repression"
14. "What Would You Do"
15. "How We Do"
16. "Freedom" (The Last Cell remix) (featuring Public Enemy and Dead Prez)

Bonus Track (The Deluxe Edition)

1. "Field Nigga Boogie" (XLR8R Remix) (featuring Immortal Technique)
