= Sleeping with the Enemy (album) =

Studio album by Paris
- Released: November 24, 1992
- Recorded: 1991−1992
- Genre: Hip-hop
- Length: 55:31
- Label: Scarface
- Producer: Paris

Paris chronology
The Devil Made Me Do It (1990)	Sleeping with the Enemy (1992)	Guerrilla Funk (1994)

Professional ratings
Review scores
Source	Rating
AllMusic	4.5/5 stars
Christgau's Consumer Guide: Albums of the '90s	(2-star Honorable Mention)
Los Angeles Times	3.5/4 stars

Sleeping With the Enemy is the second studio album by American rapper Paris. It was released on November 24, 1992, through Scarface Records. Produced entirely by Paris himself, it features guest appearances from LP and Son Doobie and contributions from Kenny Martin, Eric Bertraud, DJ Yon, DJ Shadow, Khaliq Asharri and Kif. The album peaked at number 182 on the Billboard 200 and number 23 on the Top R&B/Hip-Hop Albums charts in the United States.

== Background ==
Released on November 24, 1992, it stimulated much controversy with the songs "Bush Killa" (a revenge fantasy about the assassination of then-president George H. W. Bush) and "Coffee, Donuts & Death" (a cop-killing tirade).

Originally scheduled for a pre–presidential election release in 1992, the album was eventually released on Paris' own Scarface Records after Time Warner shareholders and media pressure prevented then-Warner Bros. Records subsidiary Tommy Boy Records from releasing the project.

It was re-released in a limited release subtitled The Deluxe Edition; it was digitally enhanced, reworked, and contains alternate versions. As of 2003, the album sold over 480,000 copies.

== Track listing ==
All tracks are written by Oscar Jerome Jackson.

No.	Title	Length
1.	"The Enema (Live at the White House)"	1:53
2.	"Make Way for a Panther"	2:30
3.	"Sleeping with the Enemy"	2:41
4.	"House Niggas Bleed Too"	1:31
5.	"Bush Killa"	4:52
6.	"Coffee, Donuts & Death"	3:52
7.	"Thinka 'Bout It"	4:27
8.	"Guerrillas in the Mist"	3:11
9.	"The Days of Old"	4:19
10.	"Long Hot Summer"	1:42
11.	"Conspiracy of Silence" (featuring L.P. and Sun Dubious)	3:42
12.	"Funky Lil' Party"	2:50
13.	"Check It Out Ch'all"	3:28
14.	"Rise"	1:12
15.	"Assata's Song"	5:02
16.	"Bush Killa" (Hellraiser Mix)	8:29
Total length:		55:31

== Personnel ==
- Oscar "Paris" Jackson – songwriter, vocals, producer, arranger
- Wendel "Lyrical Politix" Winston – vocals (track 11)
- Jason "Son Doobie" Vasquez – vocals (track 11)
- Kenny Martin – guitar (track 5)
- Joshua "DJ Shadow" Davis – sampler (tracks: 2, 9, 12)
- D.J. Yon – scratches (track 6)
- Khaliq Asharri – sampler (tracks: 10, 11, 14)
- Kif – sampler (tracks: 10, 11, 14)
- Eric Bertraud – saxophone (track 15)
- Mike Martin – engineering assistant
- Victor Hall – photography
- J. Alex – graphics

== Charts ==
Chart (1992)	Peak position
US Billboard 200	182
US Top R&B/Hip-Hop Albums (Billboard)	23
