= The Conscious Daughters =

American hip hop group

- Origin: East Oakland, California, United States
- Genres: Hip hop
- Years active: 1985–2001, 2007–2011
- Labels: Scarface Records/Priority, Guerrilla Funk Recordings/EMI Llerrad Music Group
- Past members: Carla "CMG" Green; Karryl "Special One" Smith
- Website: http://www.llerradmusic.com/

The Conscious Daughters (TCD) were an American female hip hop duo from Oakland, California, consisting of Carla "CMG" Green and Karryl "Special One" Smith. The duo signed in 1993 to Paris's record label, Scarface Records, after passing him a demo tape at a club. They released their first studio album, Ear to the Street. later that same year.

The single and video release of their 1994 single, "Somethin' to Ride To (Fonky Expedition)", helped TCD gain national recognition. Soon after, they were signed by Priority/EMI Records and released their second album, Gamers. Many collaborations, projects and television appearances followed, most notably Rap City, MTV Jams, and Soul Train.

Their third album, The Nutcracker Suite, was released on Guerrilla Funk Records on February 10, 2009. In 2010, TCD severed their relationship with Guerrilla Funk Records, and in 2011 they signed a distribution deal with Phaseone/Sony.

On December 10, 2011, Smith was found dead at her home. Initially, the cause of death was unknown, but it was eventually determined to be from complications associated with blood clots that reached her lungs.

== Discography ==
=== Studio albums ===
- Ear to the Street (1993)
- Gamers (1996)
- The Nutcracker Suite (2009)

=== Solo projects ===
- CMG - The Jane of All Trades (2011)

=== Singles ===
- "Somethin' to Ride To (Fonky Expedition)" (1993)
- "We Roll Deep" (1993)
- "Sticky Situation" (1993)
- "Gamers" (1996)
