= The Shooting of Dan McGrew =

1907 poem by Robert W. Service

- by Robert W. Service
- First published in: Songs of a Sourdough
- Country: Canada
- Language: English
- Publication date: 1907

Full text
- The Spell of the Yukon and Other Verses/The Shooting of Dan McGrew at Wikisource

"The Shooting of Dan McGrew" is a narrative poem by British-Canadian writer Robert W. Service, first published in Songs of a Sourdough in 1907 in Canada.

== Details ==
The tale takes place in a Yukon saloon during the Yukon Gold Rush of the late 1890s. It tells of three characters: Dan McGrew, a rough-neck prospector; McGrew's sweetheart Lou, a formidable pioneer woman; and a mysterious, weather-worn stranger who wanders into the saloon where the former are among a crowd of drinkers. The stranger buys drinks for the crowd, and then proceeds to the piano, where he plays a song that is alternately robust and then plaintively sad. He appears to have had a past with both McGrew and Lou, and has come to settle a grudge. McGrew and the stranger shoot and kill each other, and Lou steals the gold the stranger had brought with him.

Service was a Scotsman who came to Canada as a young adult, and was fascinated with the lives and landscapes of the Canadian Northwest where he went to work. Along with "The Cremation of Sam McGee", this poem was arguably his best known. It was the basis of a 1998 novel, The Man from the Creeks, by Robert Kroetsch, a longtime admirer of Service's works. It was also the inspiration for the 1949 song "Dangerous Dan McGrew" by Guy Lombardo and His Royal Canadians. Also it has been recalled in the fourth strophe of the song "Put the Blame on Mame", sung by Rita Hayworth in the 1946 film Gilda; the text claims that rather than being shot and killed, Dan McGrew was slain by Mame's "hoochy-coo" dance. The poem was recited by Miss Marple in the 1964 film Murder Most Foul, as her audition to join a theatrical troupe.

The character of Dan McGrew was based on William Nelson McGrew (1883-1960), who was born and raised in Guinda, California to Isaac and Nellie Ophelia (Thomas) McGrew and whose nickname was "Dangerous Dan". William McGrew had gone to the Yukon seeking his fortune during the Yukon Gold Rush. William McGrew and Robert Service were mutually antagonistic toward each other, and after one argument Robert Service is reputed to have said: "McGrew, some day I'll kill you." Service achieved his goal by killing Dan McGrew in this poem.

The poem's unique history as a spoken word piece was highlighted when US President Ronald Reagan and Canadian Prime Minister Brian Mulroney did their own alternating recital of the poem both in private meetings and in public.

The poem was also said to be Paul McCartney's inspiration for the Beatles song "Rocky Raccoon."

== Extract ==
The opening verse suggests the poem's meter and tone.

A bunch of the boys were whooping it up in the Malamute saloon;

The kid that handles the music-box was hitting a jag-time tune;

Back of the bar, in a solo game, sat Dangerous Dan McGrew,

And watching his luck was his light-o'-love, the lady that's known as Lou.

== Adaptations ==
- The Shooting of Dan McGrew (1915 film)
- The Shooting of Dan McGrew (1924 film)
- The Shooting of Dan McGrew, a 1965 animated short film directed by Ed Graham Jr., with the voices of Walter Brennan and Ernie Banks, with the latter as narrator, and music by George Shearing.
- The Shooting of Dan McGrew, a 1915 novel by Marvin Dana
- The Shooting of Dan McGrew, a 1924 novel by James J. Tryan

== Cultural references ==
- Tex Avery had directed two similar cartoons based on the poem, the first, Dangerous Dan McFoo, is a 1939 Warner Bros. Merrie Melodies cartoon, and the second, The Shooting of Dan McGoo, is a 1945 MGM cartoon, the latter starring Droopy, the Wolf and Red.
- In the 1941 film Road to Zanzibar, Bob Hope attempts to recite the poem but is cut off after the first line.
- Bluto is named "Dangerous Dan McBluto" in the 1946 Popeye cartoon Klondike Casanova.
- The Shooting of Dan McGrew, an unrelated 1972 mystery novel by Michael Kenyon shares the title of the poem.
- Charlotte MacLeod, writing as Alisa Craig, had one of her characters write a play based on The Shooting of Dan McGrew in her 1988 mystery novel, The Grub-and-Stakers Pinch a Poke. The poem is quoted at the beginning of the book.
- Gunmen of the Apocalypse, the third episode of the sixth series of Red Dwarf in which Arnold Rimmer plays a Western fistfighter called "Dangerous Dan McGrew" in an artificial reality video game.
