= Songs of a Sourdough =

Poetry book by Robert W. Service

- Author: Robert W. Service
- Language: English
- Genre: Poetry
- Published: 1907
- Publication place: Canada

Songs of a Sourdough is a book of poetry published in 1907 by Robert W. Service. In the United States, the book was published under the title The Spell of the Yukon and Other Verses.

The book is well known for its verse about the Klondike Gold Rush in the Yukon a decade earlier, particularly the long, humorous ballads, "The Shooting of Dan McGrew" and "The Cremation of Sam McGee."

Songs of a Sourdough has sold more than three million copies.

== History ==
Service, an employee of the Imperial Bank of Canada, was posted to Whitehorse, Yukon, in 1904. He "took part in the extremely active Whitehorse social life. As was popular at the time he recited at concerts – things like "Casey at the Bat" and "Gunga Din", but they were getting stale."

One day (Service later wrote), while pondering what to recite at an upcoming church concert he met E.J. "Stroller" White, editor of the Whitehorse Star. White suggested: "Why don’t you write a poem for it? Give us something about our own bit of earth. We sure would appreciate it. There’s a rich paystreak waiting for someone to work. Why don’t you go in and stake it?"

Out on a walk one Saturday night, Service heard the sounds of revelry coming from a saloon, and the phrase "A bunch of the boys were whooping it up" popped into his head. Inspired, he ran to the bank to write it down (almost being shot as a burglar), and by the next morning "The Shooting of Dan McGrew" was complete.

"A month or so later he heard a gold rush yarn from a Dawson mining man about a fellow who cremated his pal." He spent the night walking in the woods composing "The Cremation of Sam McGee," and wrote it down from memory the next day.

Other verses quickly followed. "In the early spring he stood above the heights of Miles Canyon ... the line 'I have gazed on naked grandeur where there’s nothing else to gaze on' came into his mind and again he hammered out a complete poem, “The Call of the Wild". Conversations with locals led Service to write about things he had not seen (some of which had not actually happened) as well. He did not set foot in Dawson City until 1908, arriving in the Klondike ten years after the Gold Rush when his renown as a writer was already established.

After having collected enough poems for a book, Service "sent the poems to his father, who had emigrated to Toronto, and asked him to find a printing house so they could make it into a booklet. He enclosed a cheque to cover the costs and intended to give these booklets away to his friends in Whitehorse" for Christmas. His father took the manuscript to William Briggs in Toronto, whose employees loved the book. "The foreman and printers recited the ballads while they worked. A salesman read the proofs out loud as they came off the typesetting machines." An "enterprising salesman sold 1700 copies in advance orders from galley proofs." The publisher "sent Robert's cheque back to him and offered a ten percent royalty contract for the book."

Service's book, Songs of a Sourdough, was "an immediate success." It went through seven printings even before its official release date. Ultimately, Briggs "sold fifteen impressions in 1907. That same year there was an edition in New York, Philadelphia, and London. The London publisher, T. Fisher Unwin, struck a twenty-third printing in 1910, and thirteen more by 1917."

"When copies of the book reached Whitehorse, Robert's own minister took him aside to let him know how wicked were his stories. Service hung his head in shame.... But, that summer, tourists from the south arrived in Whitehorse looking for the famous poet; and he autographed many of his books."

"Service eventually earned in excess of $100,000 for Songs of a Sourdough alone (Mackay 14, 408n19)."

== Contents ==
The book contains these poems:

- "The Land God Forgot"
- "The Spell of the Yukon"
- "The Heart of the Sourdough"
- "The Three Voices"
- "The Law of the Yukon"
- "The Parson's Son"
- "The Call of the Wild"
- "The Lone Trail"
- "The Pines"
- "The Lure of Little Voices"
- "The Song of the Wage-Slave"
- "Grin"
- "The Shooting of Dan McGrew"
- "The Cremation of Sam McGee"
- "My Madonna"
- "Unforgotten"
- "The Reckoning"
- "Quatrains"
- "The Men That Don't Fit"
- "Music in the Bush"
- "The Rhyme of the Remittance Man"
- "The Low Down White"
- "The Little Old Log Cabin"
- "The Younger Son"
- "The March of the Dead"
- ""Fighting Mac"" (a paean to the life and death of Hector MacDonald)
- "The Woman and the Angel"
- "The Rhyme of the Restless Ones"
- "New Year's Eve"
- "Comfort"
- "The Harpy"
- "Premonition"
- "The Tramps"
- "L'Envoi"
