= The Cremation of Sam McGee =

Poem written by Robert W. Service

- by Robert W. Service
- First published in: Songs of a Sourdough
- Country: Canada
- Language: English
- Publication date: 1907

Full text
- The Spell of the Yukon and Other Verses/The Cremation of Sam McGee at Wikisource

"The Cremation of Sam McGee" is among the most famous of Robert W. Service's poems. It was published in 1907 in Songs of a Sourdough. (A "sourdough", in this sense, is a resident of the Yukon.) It concerns the cremation of a prospector who freezes to death near Lake Laberge (spelled "Lebarge" by Service), Yukon, Canada, as told by the man who cremates him.

== Poem ==
Sam McGee has left his (fictional) hometown of Plumtree, Tennessee, (Note: There is a town named Plumtree in North Carolina, about 12 km (7.5 mi) southeast of the Tennessee border.) to seek gold in the Yukon. While travelling the Dawson Trail with Cap, the narrator, Sam becomes convinced that he will die of exposure to the cold and asks Cap to cremate his body. Cap agrees to the request; Sam dies the next day, leaving Cap to haul the body along the trail in search of an opportunity to cremate it. Upon reaching the "marge [shore, edge] of Lake Lebarge", he finds a derelict steamer frozen in the ice and decides to make use of it. Once Cap has lit and fuelled the boiler furnace, he stuffs in Sam's body and walks away as it burns. He returns some time later and, upon opening the furnace door, is stunned to see Sam smiling contentedly and asking him to close it so the heat will not escape.

Robert Service based the poem on an experience of his roommate, Dr. Leonard S. E. Sugden, who had cremated a corpse in the firebox of the steamer Olive May.

== Background ==
There are strange things done in the midnight sun,
by the men who moil for gold;
The Arctic trails have their secret tales
That would make your blood run cold;
The Northern Lights have seen queer sights,
But the queerest they ever did see
Was that night on the marge of Lake Lebarge
I cremated Sam McGee.

— The poem's opening and closing stanzas

Although the poem was fiction, it was based on people and things that Robert Service actually saw in the Yukon. Lake Laberge is formed by a widening of the Yukon River just north of Whitehorse and is still in use by kayakers. The Alice May was based on the derelict stern-wheeler the Olive May that belonged to the Bennett Lake & Klondike Navigation Co. and had originally been named for the wife and daughter of Albert Sperry Kerry Sr. It was abandoned after it struck a rock near Tagish, which is about 50 kilometres (31 mi) south of Lake Laberge. Dr. Sugden used its firebox to cremate the body of Cornelius Curtin (who had died of pneumonia). (Note: According to the Police Report, the deceased was Cornelius Curtin (1855-1900), who died from pneumonia at White Horse Rapids on March 27, 1900. He was attended by Dr. Sugden, who gave the necessary certificates. According to Mr. Curtin's obituary, he had fallen ill on March 23.) (Although a boat named Alice May sank on Lake Laberge, that happened a decade after the publication of the poem.)

William Samuel McGee was primarily a road builder but did indulge in some prospecting. Like others, McGee was in San Francisco, California, at the time of the Klondike Gold Rush and in 1898 left for the Klondike.

In 1904, Service, who was working in the Canadian Bank of Commerce (the predecessor of the Canadian Imperial Bank of Commerce) branch in Whitehorse, saw McGee's name on a form and used it in his poem as it was a rhyme for "Tennessee".

In 1909, McGee travelled south of the Yukon to build roads, including some in Yellowstone National Park. Eventually, McGee and his wife moved to live with their daughter outside of Beiseker, Alberta. In 1930, McGee returned to the Yukon to try prospecting along the Liard River, but met with no success. He did, however, return with an urn that he had purchased in Whitehorse. The urns, said to contain the ashes of Sam McGee, were being sold to visitors.

McGee spent the rest of his life at his daughter's farm, where he died in 1940 of a heart attack, and is buried near Beiseker.

== Legacy ==
On 17 August 1976, Canada Post issued "Robert W. Service, Sam McGee" as an 8¢ stamp designed by David Charles Bierk.

Johnny Cash's reading of the poem was National Public Radio's song of the day on May 9, 2006. Cash's "The Cremation of Sam McGee" was released along with a vast collection of personal archive recordings of Johnny Cash on the two-disc album Personal File. Canadian folksinger/songwriter Stompin' Tom Connors created an uptempo song summarizing the tale in the early 1970s on his album Stompin' Tom Meets Big Joe Mufferaw. In 2022, musician Seth Boyer adapted the poem into a bluegrass song for use in the video essay Fear of Cold by Jacob Geller.
