= List of awards and nominations received by Ridley Scott =

Ridley Scott awards and nominations
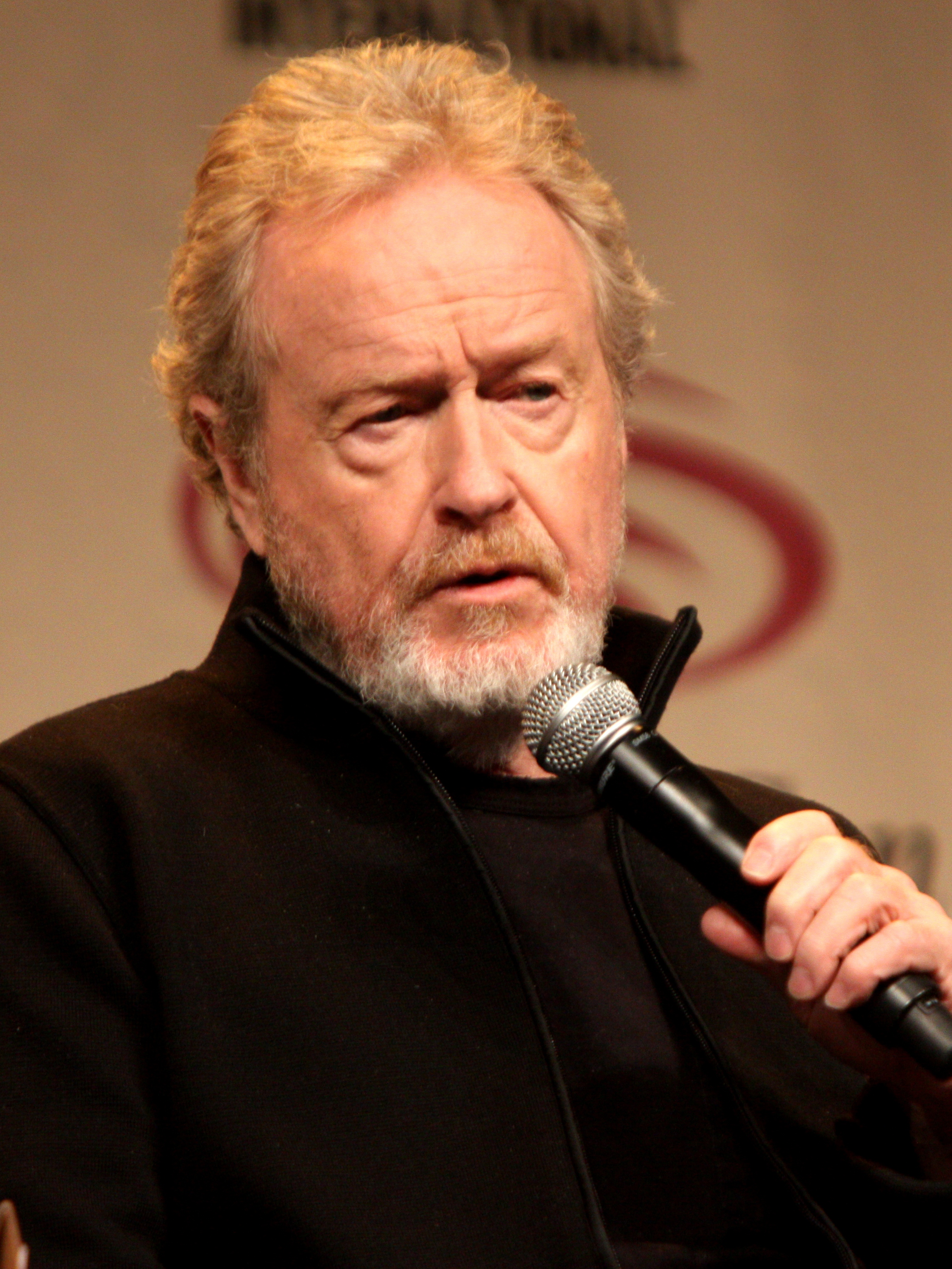
- Scott at Wondercon in 2012
Awards and nominations
Award	Wins	Nominations
Academy Awards	1	5
BAFTA Awards	2	10
Golden Globe Awards	2	9
Primetime Emmy Awards	2	10
Grammy Awards	0	1

Totals (Note: Certain award groups do not simply award one winner. They acknowledge several different recipients, have runners-up, and have third place. Since this is a specific recognition and is different from losing an award, runner-up mentions are considered wins in this award tally. For simplification and to avoid errors, each award in this list has been presumed to have had a prior nomination.)
- Wins: 6
- Nominations: 29

Ridley Scott is an English filmmaker.

His major works include the science fiction horror film Alien (1979), the neo-noir dystopian film Blade Runner (1982), the road adventure film Thelma & Louise (1991), the historical drama film Gladiator (2000), the war film Black Hawk Down (2002), and the science fiction comedy The Martian (2015). Some of his later works include Kingdom of Heaven (2005), American Gangster (2007), Robin Hood (2010), Prometheus (2012), and All the Money in the World (2017). In 2021 his films, The Last Duel and House of Gucci were released.

Scott has received various awards and nominations including four Academy Award nominations, including three nominations for Best Director for Thelma & Louise (1991), Gladiator (2000), and Black Hawk Down (2002). He also received a nomination for Best Picture for The Martian (2015). Scott has also received nine Golden Globe Award nominations, winning for producing RKO 281 in 2000 and The Gathering Storm in 2003. He also received 10 Primetime Emmy Award nominations for his work on television, winning twice for The Gathering Storm (2002), and Gettysburg (2011).

In 1995 both Scott and his brother Tony received a BAFTA for Outstanding British Contribution to Cinema. In 2003 he was knighted for services to the British film industry. In a 2004 BBC poll, Scott was ranked 10 on the list of most influential people in British culture. He received an honorary doctorate from the Royal College of Art in London in 2015, the BAFTA Fellowship for lifetime achievement in 2018, and the Academy Honorary Award in 2026.

== Major associations ==
=== Academy Awards ===
Year	Category	Nominated work	Result	Ref.
1992	Best Director	Thelma & Louise	Nominated	
2001	Best Director	Gladiator	Nominated	
2002	Best Director	Black Hawk Down	Nominated	
2016	Best Picture	The Martian	Nominated	
2026	Academy Honorary Award		Honored	

=== British Academy Film Awards ===
Year	Category	Nominated work	Result	Ref.
1992	Best Film	Thelma & Louise	Nominated	
1992	Best Director	Thelma & Louise	Nominated	
1995	Michael Balcon Award	—N/a	Honored	
2001	Best Director	Gladiator	Nominated	
2008	Best Film	American Gangster	Nominated	
2016	Best Director	The Martian	Nominated	
2018	BAFTA Fellowship	—N/a	Honored	
2022	Outstanding British Film	House of Gucci	Nominated	
2024	Outstanding British Film	Napoleon	Nominated	
2025	Outstanding British Film	Gladiator II	Nominated	

=== Primetime Emmy Award ===
Year	Category	Nominated work	Result	Ref.
2000	Outstanding Made for Television Movie	RKO 281	Nominated	
2002	Outstanding Made for Television Movie	The Gathering Storm	Won	
2008	Outstanding Miniseries	The Andromeda Strain	Nominated	
2009	Outstanding Made for Television Movie	Into the Storm	Nominated	
2010	Outstanding Drama Series	The Good Wife	Nominated	
2011	Outstanding Drama Series	The Good Wife	Nominated	
2011	Outstanding Miniseries or Movie	The Pillars of the Earth	Nominated	
2011	Outstanding Nonfiction Special	Gettysburg	Won	
2014	Outstanding Television Movie	Killing Kennedy	Nominated	
2015	Outstanding Television Movie	Killing Jesus	Nominated	

=== Golden Globe Awards ===
Year	Category	Nominated work	Result	Ref.
2000	Best Limited or Anthology Series or Television Film	RKO 281	Won	
2001	Best Director	Gladiator	Nominated	
2003	Best Limited or Anthology Series or Television Film	The Gathering Storm	Won	
2008	Best Limited or Anthology Series or Television Film	The Company	Nominated	
2008	Best Director	American Gangster	Nominated	
2010	Best Limited or Anthology Series or Television Film	Into the Storm	Nominated	
2011	Best Limited or Anthology Series or Television Film	The Pillars of the Earth	Nominated	
2016	Best Director	The Martian	Nominated	
2018	Best Director	All the Money in the World	Nominated	

=== Grammy Awards ===
Year	Category	Nominated work	Result	Ref.
2009	Best Compilation Soundtrack for Visual Media	American Gangster	Nominated	

== Industry awards ==
=== American Film Institute ===
Year	Category	Nominated work	Result
2002	Director of the Year	Black Hawk Down	Nominated
2002	Movie of the Year	Black Hawk Down	Nominated

=== Cannes Film Festival ===
Year	Category	Nominated work	Result
1977	Best Debut Film Award	The Duellists	Won
1977	Palme d'Or	The Duellists	Nominated

=== Directors Guild of America ===
Year	Category	Nominated work	Result
1992	Best Director – Motion Picture	Thelma & Louise	Nominated
2001	Best Director – Motion Picture	Gladiator	Nominated
2002	Best Director – Motion Picture	Black Hawk Down	Nominated
2016	Best Director – Motion Picture	The Martian	Nominated
2017	Lifetime Achievement Award		Won

=== National Board of Review ===
Year	Category	Nominated work	Result
2015	Best Director	The Martian	Won

== Miscellaneous awards ==
=== Saturn Awards ===
Year	Category	Nominated work	Result
1980	Best Director	Alien	Won
1983	Best Director	Blade Runner	Nominated
2001	Best Director	Gladiator	Nominated
2004	The George Pal Memorial Award		Won
2016	Best Director	The Martian	Won

=== Satellite Awards ===
Year	Category	Nominated work	Result
2001	Best Director	Gladiator	Nominated
2016	Best Director	The Martian	Nominated

=== Visual Effects Society ===
Year	Category	Nominated work	Result
2016	Lifetime Achievement Award		Won
