= Ridley Scott's unrealised projects =

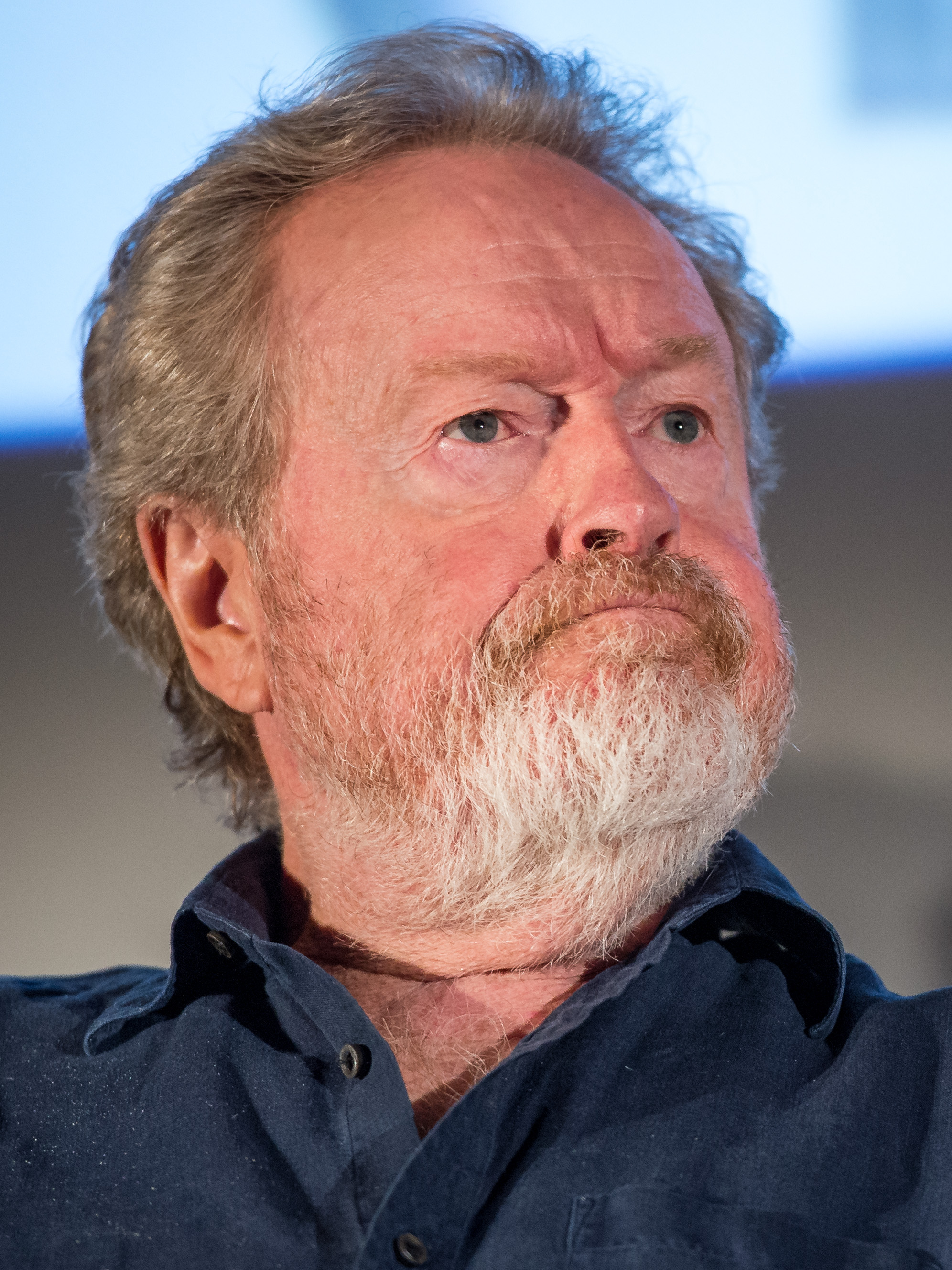
Scott in 2015

During his long career, British film director Ridley Scott has worked on a number of projects that never progressed beyond the pre-production stage under his direction. Some of these projects fell into development hell or were officially cancelled.

== 1970s ==
=== City Boy ===
When asked in an interview if he would ever make a film centered around children as main characters, Scott answered that he had once tried early on to adapt Herman Wouk's 1948 book City Boy: The Adventures of Herbie Bookbinder to film. He described the story as centering on "three children; a very pretty little girl, a child who's very plain, a child who's very handsome. It's this constant circle, as the girl plays these two kids for her affection." Scott planned to use 1970's "The Only Living Boy in New York" by Simon & Garfunkel as the title song. However, as of 2025, he said he was no longer interested in making the film, comparing it to The Adventures of Tom Sawyer in terms of being outdated.

=== Castle Accident ===
Scott's first attempt at a feature film was a medieval-set horror script Castle Accident which he collaborated with writer John Edwards on. Scott was hired to direct by producer Robert Stigwood and the film was set to star the three Bee Gees. Though it never came together, Scott would later sign on to helm a musical biopic of the groups' lives.

=== Ronnie and Leo ===
After he couldn't find funding for Castle Accident, Scott turned to a "violent" Canadian black comedy/heist thriller script he wrote called Ronnie and Leo that was to have starred Michael York and Ernest Borgnine. The film was close to being made with nearly $1.7 million in financing, but it never come to fruition.

=== The Gunpowder Plot ===
Before The Duellists, Scott first developed a separate project with Gerald Vaughan-Hughes based on the story of Guy Fawkes and the Gunpowder Plot of 1605, at the time budgeted at $2.2 million. Despite feeling that the screenplay was "on the level of A Man for All Seasons", the company, Sony, told Scott after receiving it, "can't it be more like Witchfinder General?" He fondly recalled the working relationship he had with Vaughan-Hughes, who he credits with teaching him about drama:

Gerry would say to me wonderful things, such as [he'd] say, "Listen, no one's ever done Gunpowder Plot. This is the bomb that didn't go off. How will we make this interesting? 'Cause we celebrate the demise of Guy Fawkes every November 5th; we burn his effigy." He said, "Well, your big problem is," he said, "That the plotters were idiots." He said, "You can't make films about idiots." He said, "Their passion overtook their logic." He said, "Cause if they'd been successful, what they would do, they'd have blown up the King, many Catholics, and many Protestants." He said, "So, Catholicism would have been completely devastated for the next two hundred years." He said, "So, that doesn't make sense."

According to Scott, Vaughan-Hughes' way around this issue was to add an additional character, the fictional Gideon Catlin, "who's a good flautist, a very good swordsman, and actually is Jesuit." In the leading roles, he'd cast Donald Sutherland, Robert Shaw and Alec Guinness, but Sony remained unmoved. Both the screenplays for The Gunpowder Plot and The Duellists were completed by 1976 when an executive at Paramount Pictures chose the latter instead since it was deemed less expensive to make. In an audio commentary from 2002, Scott said that he may return to the script someday.

=== The Author of Beltraffio ===
Scott had initially wanted to direct the Henry James piece Author of Beltraffio, though he relinquished the role to his brother Tony after a coin toss and the film was produced in 1976. "He won that and it ruined my whole summer", Scott later recalled.

=== Tristan and Iseult ===
In the mid-1970s, before the beginning of the filming of The Duellists, Scott pitched the idea of a film adaptation of medieval romantic legend of Tristan and Iseult, and he planned to release this film as his second movie. However, the project never materialised at the time, and Scott pitched the idea of Legend during the filming of The Duellists as a replacement of this project. A film of the same story, directed by Kevin Reynolds, was later released in 2006 with Scott as the producer.

== 1980s ==
=== Conan the Barbarian ===
In 1980, Dino De Laurentiis approached Scott to direct Conan the Barbarian. While he liked Oliver Stone's script, he did not want to cast Arnold Schwarzenegger in the lead role, which De Laurentiis was keen on. Scott told him that he would sign on right away if he changed his mind about the protagonist. Instead, John Milius was chosen as the director and the film was made in 1982 with Schwarzenegger as Conan. Scott was also apparently too preoccupied with preparing Blade Runner as his next film to be able to sign on to direct another in addition.

=== Dune ===
Around 1981, Scott was hired to direct a film adaptation of Frank Herbert's novel Dune. However, Scott was finally replaced by David Lynch, and the film was released in 1984.

=== Neuromancer ===
Sometime in the 1980s Cabana Boy Productions was working on a film adaptation of the novel Neuromancer, and were in talks with Scott and Mel Gibson. The film adaptation was cancelled, but a game—originally intended to be a movie tie-in—was still released. The Devo song "Some Things Never Change" was originally written for the film, and still appears in the game.

=== Dudes ===
Herb Jaffe and Miguel Tejada-Flores initially hired Scott to direct Randall Jahnson's script for Dudes, but replaced him with Penelope Spheeris due to creative differences.

=== The Train ===
In the late 1980s, Scott wanted to direct Jim Uhls's sci-fi action thriller The Train for Carolco. However, Scott left the project to direct Thelma and Louise and Joel Silver bought the rights; he had the script rewritten by Steven E. de Souza and retitled the project as Isobar and The ISOBAR Run. However, it was cancelled due to Carolco's bankruptcy.

=== Johnny Utah ===
Columbia Pictures hired Scott to direct an early version of W. Peter Iliff's screenplay for Point Break under the title Johnny Utah, with Charlie Sheen and James Garner starring. The film went into turnaround for several years after Scott quit the film in 1988.

=== Alien 3 ===
According to colleague John McTiernan, Scott was decided to direct Alien 3 after his own discussions with the studio fell through. "I'm glad Ridley Scott won out," he said. "He has a fantastic style." However, Scott's attachment would not last, and David Fincher finally got the job.

== 1990s ==
=== Paramour ===
In 1991, Scott was attached to produce and direct the political thriller Paramour, an adaptation of the novel by Gerald Petievich which was in development at Cinergi Pictures.

=== Crisis in the Hot Zone ===
On January 24, 1993, Scott signed a deal with 20th Century Fox to direct a film adaptation of Richard Preston's 1992 New Yorker article "Crisis in the Hot Zone." In late April 1994, Robert Redford and Jodie Foster were in talks for star in the film. However, the project was finally shut down due to many production problems and Foster's departure from it. It was subsequently revived and, in 2019, Scott and Lynda Obst developed the National Geographic miniseries.

=== Pancho's War ===
On January 26, 1993, Scott was committed to directing Pancho's War, an action-adventure written by Marcel Montecino from a story by Montecino and David Balkan set during the 1916 Mexican Revolution. The spec script, which was described by producer John Goldwyn as "a cross between the Sergio Leone westerns and the Lethal Weapon films," was purchased by Paramount Pictures who had hoped to get the film into production that year for a release the following summer, in 1994.

=== Overkill ===
In December 1993, it was reported that Scott, who wanted to take on an action film as his next project, was circling to direct the spec script Overkill by Reed Steiner. 20th Century Fox was negotiating the involvement of Scott and with Wesley Snipes possibly starring. According to Variety, the script follows a CIA agent who unretires to track down his protégé-turned-assassin.

=== Untitled Mark Malone script ===
In 1995, New York-based screenwriter Mark Malone was reportedly in the process of developing the script for a new film to be directed by Scott, though no details were disclosed regarding the project.

=== With Wings as Eagles ===
In 1996, Scott was to direct Arnold Schwarzenegger in Randall Wallace's WWII script With Wings as Eagles. According to Variety, the project follows "a Nazi who is ordered to execute GIs but liberates them instead." Wallace and Alan Ladd Jr. were set to produce for Paramount Pictures, however Scott became unavailable after Schwarzenegger's illness forced a change in schedule.

=== RKO 281 ===
On February 12, 1997, at a press conference in London, Scott announced that his next feature project would be RKO 281, a behind-the-scenes story of the battle between Orson Welles and William Randolph Hearst during the making of Citizen Kane. Scott Free Productions originally planned the docudrama as a theatrical movie, based on the documentary The Battle Over Citizen Kane which ran on PBS American Experience series. The original cast consisted of Edward Norton as Welles, Marlon Brando as Hearst, Madonna as Marion Davies, Dustin Hoffman as Herman J. Mankiewicz and Meryl Streep as Hedda Hopper. However, the projected budget in excess of $40 million, on which Scott was insisting, turned off the major studios. HBO eventually agreed to make it as a TV film, albeit with a $12 million budget and the entire cast replaced. Director Benjamin Ross also took over from Scott, who remained as executive producer.

=== Sgt. Rock ===
On February 25, 1997, Scott was in tentative negotiations to assume the director's position on a planned adaptation of the DC Comics title Sgt. Rock for Warner Bros. and producer Joel Silver. Bruce Willis was tipped to be the possible star for this iteration, while Arnold Schwarzenegger and Sylvester Stallone (both previously considered for the role before), were rumored to be making cameo appearances in the film together.

=== I Am Legend ===
On July 2, 1997, Variety reported that Scott had signed a contract with Warner Bros. to direct the third film adaptation of Richard Matheson's novel I Am Legend. Arnold Schwarzenegger was attached to portray Dr. Robert Neville and Mark Protosevich was attached to write the film, but the project was finally cancelled due to budgetary concerns on March 16, 1998. It was subsequently revived and in 2007 the film was released with Francis Lawrence as director and with Will Smith in the lead role.

=== Josiah's Canon ===
According to a 1998 Variety article, Scott had at one point "briefly flirted" with taking the helm of the action-thriller Josiah's Canon, which was later pursued as a project by his brother Tony.

=== Untitled Navy pilot film ===
In June 1998, it was reported that Scott Free Productions was developing a project about an unnamed Navy pilot who becomes a highly paid repo man that goes after custom-made jet planes, with Donald E. Stewart hired to write the script. Scott and his brother Tony were each vying for the director's position. He said that they would toss a coin to see who gets to make it, adding that it's the "first time" such a circumstance had happened since they both began their careers.

=== Untitled Newman/Haas Racing drama series ===
In 1999, it was reported that Scott Free Productions was developing a new syndicated series centered around the CART racing circuit team owned by Paul Newman and Carl Haas, with Scott hoping to direct an episode or two of the drama.

== 2000s ==
=== Captain Kidd ===
In 2000, Scott was signed by Disney to direct an adventure film from writers Douglas S. Cook and David Weisberg, based on the life of the notorious 17th century pirate Captain Kidd. Variety reported that Jerry Bruckheimer would produce the film in association with Scott Free Productions.

=== Alexander the Great ===
In July 2001, producer Dino De Laurentiis was courting Scott to direct his planned biopic of Alexander the Great. Ted Tally was writing the project, based on a trilogy of novels by Valerio Massimo Manfredi.

=== Perfume: The Story of a Murderer ===
On October 18, 2001, it was reported that Constantin Film would develop a film version of the 1981 German novel Perfume: The Story of a Murderer as a directing vehicle for Scott. The rights to Patrick Süskind's novel were won in a bidding war by producer Bernd Eichinger. In addition to Scott, the project had also piqued the interest of the likes of such directors as Stanley Kubrick, Martin Scorsese, Tim Burton, Jean-Jacques Annaud, Shekhar Kapur and Jean-Pierre Jeunet. Eichinger agreed to develop the project with Scott directing and Caroline Thompson writing the script. Though Scott confirmed these plans after completing production on Black Hawk Down, he cautioned that he was not officially attached to the film at the time. The adaptation was later overseen by director Tom Tykwer and realized in 2006, but without the use of Thompson's script.

=== Swift ===
On October 22, 2001, it was reported that Scott was attached to direct Swift, from a pitch by Stephen Cornwell, and selected it to be the first project in his new development pact with 20th Century Fox. At the time, Swift, which follows a young detective investigating a series of supernatural murders, was viewed as a possible franchise by the studio.

=== Untitled fifth Alien film ===
In an interview in January 2002, Scott expressed his desire to make a fifth installment in the Alien franchise. He stated that the fifth film would explain the Aliens' origins and where they were discovered. James Cameron was attached to return as writer and producer. However, the project was finally shelved by 20th Century Fox since they thought that they would ruin the franchise with a fifth film; Alien vs. Predator was released in 2004 instead, as the first installment of the Alien vs. Predator spin-off franchise.

=== Tripoli ===
In March 2002, Scott was set to direct and produce the historical epic Tripoli, with William Monahan writing the script about William Eaton’s march during the First Barbary War. Mark Gordon was attached to produce, while Russell Crowe and Ben Kingsley were cast as Eaton and Hamet Karamanli respectively. The project was shelved so Scott could direct Kingdom of Heaven.

=== Untitled Western film ===
In May 2002, it was reported that Scott would direct an untitled period Western written by Bruce C. McKenna through Scott Free Productions and 20th Century Fox. It was scheduled to go into production following the completion of Scott's Matchstick Men and the unmade Tripoli.

=== Popcorn ===
In October 2002, Scott was attached to direct Popcorn for Warner Bros., about an about an Oscar-winning filmmaker forced to confront the issues presented by his films when a serial-killing couple blames him for their crimes.

=== Metropolis ===
In the 2000s, Scott mooted a sequel to 1982's Blade Runner under the title Metropolis.

=== Shadow Divers ===
In June 2005, Scott was set to direct and produce the film adaptation of Robert Kurson’s book Shadow Divers with William Broyles writing the script for 20th Century Fox. On 4 August 2010, Scott was replaced by Robert Schwentke as director of Shadow Divers with Simon Kinberg producing, and in November 2010, Mark Bomback will write a new draft of the script under Schwentke's supervision. However, plans fell into development hell and its fate is unknown after the Acquisition of 21st Century Fox by Disney was completed.

=== The Killing Sea ===
In May 2006, Scott and his brother Tony were set to produce the film adaptation of Richard B. Lewis's novel The Killing Sea for 20th Century Fox, with Scott possibly directing.

=== The Company ===
The miniseries adaptation of Robert Littell's The Company was initially developed by writer Ken Nolan around 2006–7 in the form of a feature film for Scott to direct, after previously collaborating together on Black Hawk Down. However, Littell's 897-page book deemed too difficult to condense into a two-hour film, so the project was expanded to six hours and produced by Scott Free Productions for television instead.

=== Child 44 ===
In April 2007, it was reported that Ridley Scott was attached to direct and produce screenwriter Tom Rob Smith’s debut novel Child 44 for Fox 2000.

=== The Passage ===
In August 2007, Fox 2000 and Ridley Scott's Scott Free Productions purchased the film rights to Justin Cronin's novel The Passage for $1.75 million, long before the book was completed. In 2009, John Logan, writer of Scott's Gladiator, was set to adapt the novel for Scott to potentially direct. The adaptation was ultimately produced in the form of a TV series, with Scott serving as executive producer, alongside Liz Heldens and Matt Reeves.

=== Stones ===
In November 2007, Fox 2000 hired Scott to direct Stones, a supernatural thriller revolving around the mysterious destruction of ancient religious sites scripted by Matt Cirulnick, to be produced by Scott Free. The film was slated to resume development after the Writers Guild of America strike concluded.

=== The Low Dweller ===
In March 2008, Scott and Leonardo DiCaprio were set to reteam, after their collaboration on Body of Lies, for the dark thriller The Low Dweller for Relativity Media. Scott and DiCaprio were to produce the film, with DiCaprio attached to star and Scott eyeing to direct from a spec script by Brad Ingelsby. Set in Indiana in the mid-1980s, the story centers on a man (to be played by DiCaprio) who tries to adapt to regular life after being released from jail, only to find someone from his past pursuing him to settle a score.

=== The Kind One ===
In April 2008, Scott was set to direct the movie adaptation of Tom Epperson's crime novel The Kind One, from a screenplay by Epperson and Casey Affleck attached to star as Danny Landon. There has been no further announcements since.

=== Untitled Alien spin-off ===
In late 2008, Sigourney Weaver hinted in an interview with MTV that she and Scott were working on an Alien spin-off film, which would focus on the chronicles of Ellen Ripley rather than on the Aliens, but the continuation of Ripley's story has not materialised.

=== Purefold ===
In June 2009, The New York Times revealed that Scott along with his now-deceased brother Tony Scott were working on a web series inspired by Blade Runner with episodes of five or ten minutes, that, according to Ridley, could have also been broadcast on television. In February 2010, it was reported that the production of the series was cancelled due to funding problems.

=== Brave New World ===
In August 2009, Scott planned to direct an adaptation of Aldous Huxley's Brave New World set in a dystopian London with Leonardo DiCaprio. However, as of 2013, the project was put on hold while Scott became involved with other projects. The project was revived as a TV series released in 2020.

=== Red Riding ===
In October 2009, Columbia Pictures acquired the rights to produce a film remake of the U.K. miniseries Red Riding, adapted from David Peace's Red Riding Quartet novel series. Steve Zaillian was in negotiations to write the script at the time, with Scott attached to direct. In May 2011, it was reported that James Vanderbilt would write the script for the film. There have been no further announcements since.

== 2010s ==
=== Robin Hood sequels ===
On April 4, 2010, Scott revealed his hopes of making a sequel to Robin Hood. On May 13, 2010, Russell Crowe expressed his desire to reprise his role as Robin Longstride/Robin Hood. However, plans for the sequel fell into development hell.

=== The Wolf of Wall Street ===
In July 2010, Warner Bros. had offered Scott the chance to direct The Wolf of Wall Street, with Brad Pitt playing the male lead, but Scott eventually abandoned the project and was later replaced by Martin Scorsese.

=== The Color of Lightning ===
On 14 December 2010, Scott was set to direct and produce the film adaptation of Paulette Jiles's The Color of Lightning, from a script by Diana Ossana and Larry McMurtry. However, plans for The Color of Lightning fell into development hell and its fate is unknown after the acquisition of 21st Century Fox by Disney was completed.

=== Gertrude Bell ===
On 30 March 2011, Scott was set to produce and possibly direct a biopic of Gertrude Bell from a Jeffrey Caine script. On 17 November 2011, Angelina Jolie was set to portray Bell, however, plans fell into development hell and its fate is unknown after the Acquisition of 21st Century Fox by Disney was completed.

=== Blood Red Road ===
On 12 May 2011, Scott was set to direct a film adaptation of Moira Young's Blood Red Road book from a script by Jack Thorne for the UK division of Scott Free Productions. There has been no further announcements since.

=== Reykjavík ===
On 17 May 2011, Scott was set to direct and produce a Cold War thriller about the Reykjavík Summit, from a script by Kevin Hood for Headline Films. On 29 August 2012, it was announced that Mike Newell would replace Scott as director of Reykjavík, with Michael Douglas and Christoph Waltz as Ronald Reagan and Mikhail Gorbachev, respectively. On 13 May 2014, Baltasar Kormákur replaced Newell as director. However, the project fell into development hell.

=== Untitled Simon Mann biopic ===
On 17 November 2011, Scott was set to direct and produce the assassination thriller about Simon Mann's coup against the president of Equatorial Guinea in 2004. Gerard Butler was set to star as Mann, and Robert Edwards would have written the script. There have been no further announcements since.

=== Cascade ===
On 26 February 2013, it was reported that Fox was wrapping up a deal for Kieran Fitzgerald to write the script for a reality-based disaster film loosely inspired by the BBC faux-documentary The Day Britain Stopped, which was being developed as a potential directing vehicle for Scott. Scott would have produced the film with Steven Zaillian. On 3 December 2014, the film was titled Cascade, with Baltasar Kormákur set to direct and Cate Blanchett rumored to be the lead. However, the project fell into development hell and its fate is unknown after the Acquisition of 21st Century Fox by Disney was completed.

=== Concussion ===
On 7 November 2013, Scott had an idea of an NFL concussion film, inspired by Dr. Bennet Omalu's study about former NFL stars Junior Seau and Dave Duerson, both of whom committed suicide after suffering from chronic traumatic encephalopathy (CTE). Scott was set to direct, following Exodus: Gods and Kings, while he and Giannina Facio were looking for an A-list writer. Peter Landesman eventually replaced Scott as director, resulting in the 2015 film.

=== The Cartel ===
On 23 July 2015, Scott was set to direct the adaptation of Don Winslow's The Cartel from a Shane Salerno script. Fox courted Leonardo DiCaprio to play the leading role. However, the film fell into development hell, and it has since been announced that Winslow would produce a TV series based on The Cartel for FX.

=== Alien: Covenant sequel ===
On 23 September 2015, Scott said he was planning two sequels to Prometheus, which would lead into the first Alien film, adding: "Maybe [there will] even [be] a fourth film before we get back into the Alien franchise." In November 2015, Scott confirmed that Alien: Covenant would be the first of three additional films in the Alien prequel series, before linking up with the original Alien and stated that the Prometheus sequels would reveal who created the xenomorph aliens. The screenplay for the third prequel film, called Alien: Awakening, was written during production of Alien: Covenant and was finished in 2017, with production scheduled to begin in 2018. In March 2017, Scott said: "If you really want a franchise, I can keep cranking it for another six. I'm not going to close it down again. No way." In May, Scott announced that Neill Blomkamp's sequel to James Cameron's film Aliens had been cancelled. In a later interview, he said he would have participated as a producer, but that 20th Century Fox had decided not to pursue the project. In an interview, Scott confirmed the next film sequel will include surviving engineers who were away from their planet while David destroyed its indigenous population. Michael Reyes, writing for Cinema Blend in July 2017, quoted Scott stating that if Sigourney Weaver could reprise her role as Ellen Ripley in the prequels, then "Well, we're heading toward the back end of the first Alien so [using CGI] may be feasible. Ripley's going to be somebody's daughter, obviously. We're coming in from the back end. The time constraints of what's the time between this film, where we leave David going off heading for that colony, I think you're probably two films out from even considering her." According to reports, there will be only one additional prequel film (Alien: Awakening) before a soft reboot is made to the Alien universe, consisting of a new series of films with brand-new and original characters as well as a new setting. In the audio commentary for Alien: Covenant, Scott confirmed that a sequel to Alien: Covenant, tentatively referred to as Alien: Covenant 2, was being written by John Logan, with Fassbender, Waterston and McBride set to reprise their roles. Scott also confirmed that the film would cap his prequel series, leading directly into the events of Alien. By September 2017, chief-executive-officer of 20th Century Fox Stacey Snider, stated that although Alien: Covenant was a financial disappointment, the studio intends to proceed with Scott's sequel. In late September 2017, screen-graphics designer Carl Braga (aka HumanMedia) announced that the project had been delayed (at best). Michael Nordine, writing for Indiewire in October 2017, quoted Scott as stating that Alien: Covenant 2 will focus more on the androids and A.I.s as opposed to the xenomorphs. Scott said: "I think the evolution of the Alien himself is nearly over, but what I was trying to do was transcend and move to another story, which would be taken over by A.I.s. The world that the A.I. might create as a leader if he finds himself on a new planet. We have actually quite a big layout for the next one." In November 2018, Empire announced that the film would take place on LV-426, with the extraterrestrial Engineers being featured in the film and being in pursuit of David following his nefarious actions against Planet 4. At the 2019 CinemaCon, it was stated that, after its acquisition of 21st Century Fox, Disney "will continue to create new stories" in the Alien series. In May 2019, Variety reported that another prequel was reportedly "in the script phase", with Scott attached to direct. In 2020, Scott confirmed that a new Alien film was in development. In August 2021, however, a news report concluded that a sequel is currently uncertain. In a 2026 Los Angeles Times profile, Scott said that a new Alien prequel was indeed in the works, and would pick up with Fassbender's David 8 character "creating a brave new world".

=== The Prisoner ===
In January 2016, Scott was in early negotiations to direct the film version of the 1968 British TV series The Prisoner.

=== Wraiths of the Broken Land ===
In May 2016, it was announced that Scott would direct an adaptation of S. Craig Zahler's Western novel Wraiths of the Broken Land, with Drew Goddard writing the script and co-producing with Genre Films. However, the project fell into development hell and its fate is unknown after the Acquisition of 21st Century Fox by Disney was completed.

=== The Battle of Britain ===
In April 2017, Scott was set to direct a film about the Battle of Britain for 20th Century Studios from a Matthew Orton script, which was described as a "passion project" for the director. However, the project fell into development hell and its fate was unknown after the Acquisition of 21st Century Fox by Disney was completed. As of October 31, 2024, the project was still in development, under a new script being written by Joe Penhall.

=== Blade Runner 2049 sequel ===
In October 2017, Denis Villeneuve said that he expected a third film would be made if 2049 was successful. Hampton Fancher, who wrote both films, said he was considering reviving an old story idea involving Deckard traveling to another country. Ford said that he would be open to returning if he liked the script. In January 2018, Scott stated that he had "another [story] ready to evolve and be developed, [that] there is certainly one to be done for sure", referring to a third Blade Runner film.

=== The Merlin Saga ===
In January 2018, it was reported Scott was in negotiations to direct The Merlin Saga, based on the T. A. Barron books for Disney, with Philippa Boyens as the writer. In October 2021, it was announced that Scott had departed the film, owing to his busy schedule and that Michael Matthews would direct the film, with Chris Weitz writing the latest draft.

=== Queen & Country ===
On 15 March 2018, TheWrap reported that Scott was in talks to take over directing the Oni Press comic book film Queen & Country from Craig Viveiros. John Rogers, Ryan Condel, Olivia Milch, and creator Greg Rucka all wrote drafts of the script. On 19 June 2018, Sylvia Hoeks was speculated to be playing the titular Tara Chace. However, the film fell into development hell and its fate is unknown after Disney's acquisition of 21st Century Fox was completed.

=== It's What I Do ===
On 24 October 2018, Scott signed on to direct the Lynsey Addario biopic It's What I Do, from Peter Craig's script for Warner Bros. after Steven Spielberg abandoned the project, and wanted Scarlett Johansson to replace Jennifer Lawrence as Addario; Johansson dropped out the following day, after finding out that it was being funded by the Saudi crown prince Mohammad bin Salman. There have been no further announcements since.

== 2020s ==
=== Roads to Freedom TV miniseries ===
On March 17, 2021, it was announced that Scott would executive produce the World War II miniseries Roads to Freedom, based on the works of military historian Antony Beevor, in addition to directing the first episode, with Beevor and Steven Knight writing all ten episodes. There has been no further announcements since.

=== Blade Runner 2099 TV series ===
On February 11, 2022, when Blade Runner 2099 was first announced, sources told Deadline that Scott may direct the episodes if the project went forward. He was ultimately not involved in the resulting series—which was directed by Jonathan van Tulleken and released in 2026—commenting, "I can't blame my lawyers and my agents at that time, but somehow we let Blade Runner go."

=== Freewalkers ===
On November 6, 2023, Scott told The New Yorker that he was in the process of storyboarding a Western project, and on November 14, he told Deadline that he would begin shooting this project in March 2024. By June 2024, costume designer Janty Yates confirmed the project, titled Freewalkers, was shelved due to weather and scheduling conditions. "It's a film that's not going to happen because it's set in the snow," she said. "By the time we prepped it, we would have been shooting in mid-summer." Scott was still keen to make it as of 2025.

=== Bomb ===
On December 16, 2023, Scott signed on to direct the action thriller Bomb for 20th Century Studios, based on a short story by Kevin McMullin, who would also write the screenplay.

=== You Should Be Dancing ===
In February 2024, it was announced that Scott would direct Paramount Pictures' Bee Gees biopic titled You Should Be Dancing, written by John Logan and Joe Penhall. Scott told Film Stories that, with the film, he intended to capture not only the Bee Gees but the wider music scene of the 1960s and '70s. Principal photography was initially scheduled to begin in early 2025 in London and Miami. Due to issues stemming from negotiations, Scott elected to move forward with The Dog Stars first before filming You Should Be Dancing in September. In a June 2025 interview, Scott would state it would begin filming in November. By August 2026, he remained optimistic that the project would still happen.

== See also ==
- Ridley Scott filmography
