= Ridley Scott filmography =

List of moving image media productions by Ridley Scott

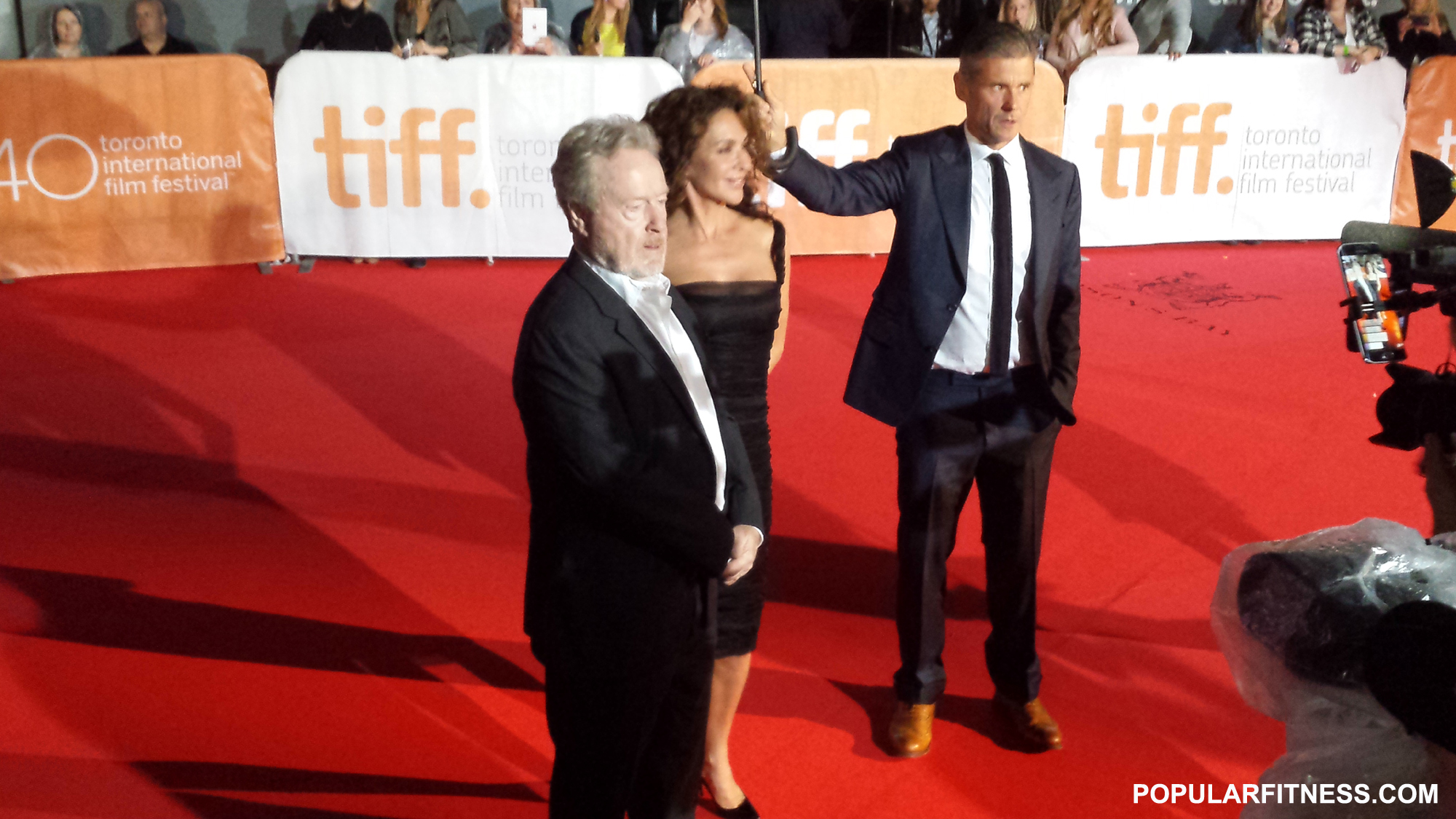
Sir Ridley Scott with his third wife Giannina Facio at the Toronto International Film Festival. The couple were caught on September 11, 2015, as they attended the world premiere of Scott's 23rd feature film, The Martian.

The following is the filmography of English filmmaker Ridley Scott, best known for directing Alien (1979), Blade Runner (1982), Gladiator (2000) and The Martian (2015).

== Film ==
Short film

Year	Title	Notes
1965	Boy and Bicycle	Also producer, writer and cinematographer
2005	Thunder Perfect Mind	Co-directed with Jordan Scott
2017	The Crossing	Prologue to Alien: Covenant
2019	The Journey	
2023	Behold	

Feature film

Year	Title	Director	Producer	Notes
1977	The Duellists	Yes	No	Also camera operator
1979	Alien	Yes	No	Inducted into the National Film Registry in 2002
1982	Blade Runner	Yes	No	Inducted into the National Film Registry in 1993
1985	Legend	Yes	No	
1987	Someone to Watch Over Me	Yes	Executive	
1989	Black Rain	Yes	No	
1991	Thelma & Louise	Yes	Yes	Inducted into the National Film Registry in 2016
1992	1492: Conquest of Paradise	Yes	Yes	
1996	White Squall	Yes	Executive	
1997	G.I. Jane	Yes	Yes	
2000	Gladiator	Yes	No	Also camera operator (uncredited)
2001	Hannibal	Yes	Yes	
2002	Black Hawk Down	Yes	Yes	
2003	Matchstick Men	Yes	Yes	
2005	Kingdom of Heaven	Yes	Yes	
2006	A Good Year	Yes	Yes	
2007	American Gangster	Yes	Yes	
2008	Body of Lies	Yes	Yes	
2010	Robin Hood	Yes	Yes	
2012	Prometheus	Yes	Yes	
2013	The Counselor	Yes	Yes	
2014	Exodus: Gods and Kings	Yes	Yes	
2015	The Martian	Yes	Yes	
2017	Alien: Covenant	Yes	Yes	
2017	All the Money in the World	Yes	Yes	
2021	The Last Duel	Yes	Yes	
2021	House of Gucci	Yes	Yes	
2023	Napoleon	Yes	Yes	
2024	Gladiator II	Yes	Yes	
2026	The Dog Stars	Yes	Yes	

As producer

- The Browning Version (1994)
- Clay Pigeons (1998)
- Where the Money Is (2000)
- In Her Shoes (2005)
- The Assassination of Jesse James by the Coward Robert Ford (2007)
- The Grey (2011)
- Stoker (2013)
- The East (2013)
- Out of the Furnace (2013)
- Child 44 (2015)
- Concussion (2015)
- Morgan (2016)
- Phoenix Forgotten (2017)
- Mark Felt: The Man Who Brought Down the White House (2017)
- Murder on the Orient Express (2017)
- American Woman (2018)
- Earthquake Bird (2019)
- Death on the Nile (2022)
- Boston Strangler (2023)
- A Haunting in Venice (2023)
- A Sacrifice (2024)
- Alien: Romulus (2024)
- Echo Valley (2025)

As executive producer

- Monkey Trouble (1994)
- RKO 281 (1999)
- Tristan & Isolde (2006)
- Cracks (2009)
- Welcome to the Rileys (2010)
- Cyrus (2010)
- The A-Team (2010)
- Life in a Day (2011)
- Welcome to the Punch (2013)
- Before I Go to Sleep (2014)
- Get Santa (2014)
- Equals (2015)
- Mindhorn (2016)
- Newness (2017)
- Blade Runner 2049 (2017)
- Zoe (2018)
- The Aftermath (2019)
- Lyrebird (2019)
- Our Friend (2019)
- Jungleland (2019)
- Life in a Day 2020 (2021)
- Naked Singularity (2021)
- Kipchoge: The Last Milestone (2021)
- Trap House (2025)

== Television ==
Designer

- Tonight: "The Big Freeze" (10 February 1963 - exists)
- Out of the Unknown: "Some Lapse of Time" (6 December 1965 - exists)

Director

- Z Cars: "Error of Judgement" (9 June 1965 - lost)
- Thirty Minute Theatre: "The Hard Wood" (16 May 1966 - lost)
- Adam Adamant Lives!: "The League of Uncharitable Ladies" (22 September 1966 - exists)
- Adam Adamant Lives!: "Death Begins at Seventy" (18 February 1967 - lost)
- Adam Adamant Lives!: "The Resurrectionists" (11 March 1967 - lost)
- The Troubleshooters: "If He Hollers - Let Him Go" (27 January 1969 - lost)
- The Vatican: pilot episode (2013)

Developer

- 2012: Coma
- 2013: Killing Lincoln
- 2013: Killing Kennedy
- 2015: Killing Jesus

Producer

- 2005–2010: Numbers

Executive producer

- 2008: The Andromeda Strain
- 2009–2016: The Good Wife
- 2010: The Pillars of the Earth
- 2011: Prophets of Science Fiction
- 2011: Gettysburg
- 2012: Britain in a Day
- 2012: World Without End
- 2012: Labyrinth
- 2014: Halo: Nightfall
- 2015–2019: The Man in the High Castle
- 2016–2017: Mercy Street
- 2016: BrainDead
- 2017: Taboo
- 2017–2022: The Good Fight
- 2018–2019, TBA: The Terror
- 2019: The Passage
- 2019: A Christmas Carol
- 2020–2022: Raised by Wolves (also directed 2 episodes)
- 2023: Kaleidoscope
- 2023: Great Expectations
- 2023: Still Missing Morgan
- 2024: Elsbeth
- 2025: Dope Thief (also directed pilot episode)
- 2025: Alien: Earth
- 2026: Blade Runner 2099

== Commercials ==
- 1970: "Good strong coffee," hired by BBDO for the International Coffee Organization
- 1973: Bike Round for Hovis
- 1979: Chanel... Share the fantasy. for Chanel
- 1984: 1984 for Apple Computer
- 1986: Deficit Trials on YouTube for W.R. Grace
- 1986: The Choice of a New Generation for Pepsi (Starred Don Johnson and Glenn Frey)
- 1988: "Nights what you make it" Filmed at DNA LOUNGE San Francisco. Ca. Music by English Band. "TalkTalk" Shooting Star flashing across screen is Billi Taylor von Terra Australis (Singer/Guitarist) The waitress in the blue hat. For Anheuser-Busch. MICHELOB.
- 1992: Nissan 300ZX Twin Turbo Super Bowl commercial
- 1995: Hutchison Telecom Future Thoughts RSA / Orange Telecom
- 1995: "La Légende de Quézac"
- 2012: Fame for Lady Gaga Fame (Executive producer)
- 2012: Coca-Cola's The Polar Bears (producer)
- 2016: "Ridley Scott + IBM Watson: A Conversation" on YouTube for IBM
- 2019: The Journey for Turkish Airlines

== See also ==
- Ridley Scott's unrealised projects
