= George J. Schaefer =

American motion picture producer and studio executive

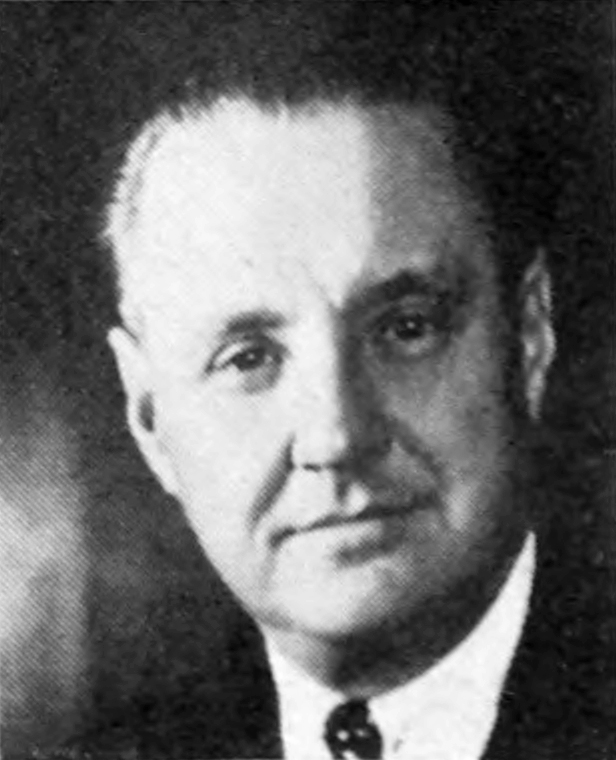
George J. Schaefer (1938)

George Joseph Schaefer (November 5, 1888, Brooklyn, New York – August 8, 1981) was an American motion picture producer and studio executive.

== Career ==
Schaefer joined Paramount Pictures in 1920 and became general manager in 1933. He became vice president and chief executive officer at United Artists and was then hired as president of RKO Pictures in 1938. In 1941 Orson Welles made his classic film Citizen Kane at RKO. He was fired from RKO in 1942 because of the controversy surrounding Welles' second film The Magnificent Ambersons and due to RKO's lackluster box office receipts.

Other films made by RKO during Schaefer's time at the studio include; Gunga Din (1939), The Hunchback of Notre Dame (1939), Abe Lincoln in Illinois (1940), and The Devil and Daniel Webster (1941)

Schaefer was the first person to receive the Motion Picture Association's award for civic and patriotic service.

== In popular culture ==
Schaefer was played by Roy Scheider in RKO 281, a highly fictionalized 1999 TV movie depicting the production of Citizen Kane.
