= The Young Poisoner's Handbook =

1995 British film

- Directed by: Benjamin Ross
- Written by: Jeff Rawle; Benjamin Ross
- Produced by: Sam Taylor
- Starring: Hugh O'Conor; Tobias Arnold; Ruth Sheen; Roger Lloyd-Pack; Norman Caro; Charlotte Coleman
- Cinematography: Hubert Taczanowski
- Edited by: Anne Sopel
- Distributed by: C/FP Distribution
- Release dates: 20 January 1995 (Sundance); 15 September 1995 (United Kingdom)
- Running time: 93 minutes
- Countries: United Kingdom; Germany; France
- Language: English
- Box office: $330,466 (US)

The Young Poisoner's Handbook is a 1995 black comedy-drama film based on the life of Graham Young, more commonly known as "The Teacup Murderer". It was directed by Benjamin Ross and written by Ross and Jeff Rawle. The film stars Hugh O'Conor in the lead role.

== Plot ==
Graham Young has been obsessed with death and the macabre since childhood. He is highly intelligent, with an aptitude for chemistry. He also dreams of poisoning as many people as he can. In his teen years, he poisons a schoolmate—making him ill rather than killing him—in order to date a girl his schoolmate was seeing. His conversation with his date involves vivid, graphic descriptions of deadly car accidents. He also reads a comic book account of an event in which the Dutch Resistance killed a whole German army camp in the occupied Netherlands during the Second World War by poisoning their water supply with thallium.

Graham is arrested at the age of 14 outside his home in Neasden after poisoning his father and stepmother with thallium, killing his stepmother and leaving his father seriously ill. During the struggle with police, he drops his "Exit Dose" of thallium, which he intended to use to commit suicide should he be caught. He is hospitalised for nine years in an institution for the criminally insane, during which time a psychiatrist works with him in the hopes of rehabilitating him.

Graham's dishonesty becomes evident to the doctor, who can see that Graham is trying to deceive him. Graham apparently has no dreams to share with the psychiatrist so he "borrows" a fellow prisoner's dreams. This source is shut off to him, however, once the fellow prisoner commits suicide. Despite the initial evidence of Graham's deceitfulness, the doctor eventually gets him released.

Graham then goes to work in a camera factory and is shown the secret ingredient used in the company's shutter system—thallium. It is not long before Graham starts poisoning people again. He kills two of his workmates by poisoning their tea with thallium stolen from the laboratory, and makes many others ill. For months, the source of the "bug" afflicting the workers at the factory remains a mystery until one unforeseen event leads to Graham's being found out. As a hygiene measure, all the personalised teacups are replaced with uniform ones, leaving Graham unable to poison people selectively. His efforts to memorise which cup is going to which person give him away and his workmates finally realise what is going on.

Graham is arrested soon afterwards and he is later sentenced to a lengthy custodial term, this time in an ordinary prison. He commits suicide by poisoning himself with the "Newton's Diamond" he made in the psychiatric hospital.

== Cast ==
- Hugh O'Conor as Graham Young
  - Tobias Arnold as Young Graham
- Ruth Sheen as Molly
- Roger Lloyd-Pack as Fred
- Norman Caro as Mr. Goez
- Dorothea Alexander as Mrs. Goez
- Charlotte Coleman as Winnie
- Paul Stacey as Dennis
- Samantha Edmonds as Sue
- Robert Dem as Mr. Dextereger
- Jack Deam as Mick
- Peter Pacey as Dickie Boone
- Joost Siedhoff as Dr. Scott
- Vilma Hollingbery as Aunty Panty
- Frank Mills as Uncle Jack
- Rupert Farley as Nurse Trent
- Dirk Robertson as Nurse Hopwood
- Chris Lawson as Prison Officer
- Malcolm Sinclair as Dr. Triefus
- Charlie Creed-Miles as Berridge
- Antony Sher as Dr. Zeigler
- Cate Fowler as Social Services Worker
- John Abbott as Chair
- Anna and Katja Kollenda as Baby Donna
- Hazel Douglas as Edna
- Arthur Cox as Ray
- John Thomson as Nathan
- Jean Warren as Debra
- Simon Kunz as John
- Tim Potter as Simon

== Reception ==
On review aggregator Rotten Tomatoes, The Young Poisoner's Handbook has an approval rating of 87% based on 15 reviews.

Roger Ebert awarded the film 3 and ½ stars out of four and praised O'Conor's performance. He wrote, "Benjamin Ross, who directed and co-wrote with Jeff Rawle, somehow finds the right tone for this material; the events in the movie are dismaying, but the effect is darkly comic. Not long ago...I observed that anything can be made funny, 'but humor depends on tone, timing and even on taste, and when a comedy starts on the wrong foot, it is hard to regain balance'...The Young Poisoner's Handbook is both funny and creepy, like an accident that is tragic and absurd at the same time (I am reminded of the famous Second City sketch in which mourners at a funeral discover that their friend drowned in a large can of pork and beans)."

The film opened in the United Kingdom on 15 September 1995 on 48 screens and grossed £56,280 in its opening weekend, finishing at number 11 at the UK box office.
