= Poppy Shakespeare =

2006 novel by Clare Allan

- Author: Clare Allan
- Language: English
- Published: 3 April 2006
- Publisher: Bloomsbury
- Publication place: United Kingdom
- ISBN: 978-0-7475-8046-1

Poppy Shakespeare is a 2006 British novel and 2008 Channel 4 film about mental illness by Clare Allan. It tells the story of day patients at a mental health hospital. The central characters are Poppy Shakespeare, a new patient, and "N", a long-term patient. Poppy arrives at the hospital strongly asserting that she is sane and demanding to be released from the programme. To gain legal aid she must first prove she is sick so that she can get "MAD money", a.k.a. state benefits. She is befriended by N, who helps her work the system.

== History ==
Author Clare Allan spent 10 years in a mental health institution.

The book was adapted by Sarah Williams and Cowboy Films to a 90-minute drama directed by Benjamin Ross and shown on Channel 4 on 31 March 2008 and starred Anna Maxwell Martin as N and Naomie Harris as Poppy. The book was short-listed for the Guardian First Book Award 2006, the Orange Award for New Writers 2007 and the BT Mind Book of the year 2007 and long-listed for the Orange Broadband Prize for Fiction 2007.

Michel Faber's review in The Guardian identifies the novel as "distinctive and powerful debut, full of brave experiments that generate unexpectedly fierce emotional heat. In a literary scene whose established stars milk tragedies such as the Holocaust or 9/11 for precious little reason beyond their own artistic vanity, Allan has given us something indigestibly, potently true."
