= Ridley Scott =

English filmmaker (born 1937)

Sir Ridley Scott GBE
- Scott in 2025
- Born: 30 November 1937 (age 88); South Shields, County Durham, England
- Education: West Hartlepool College of Art; Royal College of Art
- Occupations: Director; producer
- Years active: 1963–present
- Works: Filmography; unrealised projects
- Spouses: Felicity Heywood (m. 1964; div. 1975); Sandy Watson (m. 1979; div. 1989); Giannina Facio (m. 2015)
- Children: Jake; Luke; Jordan
- Relatives: Tony Scott (brother)
- Awards: Full list

Sir Ridley Scott (born 30 November 1937) is an English filmmaker. His work includes science fiction, crime, and historical epic films, with an atmospheric and highly concentrated visual style. Scott is the eighth-highest-grossing director of all time, with his films grossing a cumulative $5 billion worldwide. He has received numerous accolades including two Golden Globe Awards and two Primetime Emmy Awards, as well as nominations for four Academy Awards, eight BAFTA Awards, and a Grammy Award. He has also been honoured with the BAFTA Fellowship for Lifetime Achievement in 2018 and the Academy Honorary Award in 2026. Scott was knighted by Queen Elizabeth II in 2003, and appointed a Knight Grand Cross by King Charles III in 2024.

An alumnus of the Royal College of Art in London, Scott began his career in television as a designer and director before moving into advertising as a director of commercials. He made his film directorial debut with The Duellists (1977) and gained wider recognition with his next film, Alien (1979). Though his films range widely in setting and period, they showcase memorable imagery of urban environments, spanning 2nd-century Rome in Gladiator (2000) and its 2024 sequel, 12th-century Jerusalem in Kingdom of Heaven (2005), medieval England in Robin Hood (2010), ancient Memphis in Exodus: Gods and Kings (2014), contemporary Mogadishu in Black Hawk Down (2001), futuristic cityscapes of Los Angeles in Blade Runner (1982), and extraterrestrial worlds in Alien, Prometheus (2012), The Martian (2015) and Alien: Covenant (2017).

Scott has been nominated for the Academy Award for Best Director three times, for Thelma & Louise (1991), Gladiator, and Black Hawk Down, while also receiving a nomination for Best Picture for The Martian. In 1995, both Scott and his brother Tony received a British Academy Film Award for Outstanding British Contribution to Cinema. Three of his films—Alien, Blade Runner, and Thelma & Louise—have been selected for preservation in the United States National Film Registry by the Library of Congress for being considered "culturally, historically, or aesthetically significant". In a 2004 BBC poll, Scott was ranked 10 on the list of most influential people in British culture.

Scott also works in television, and has earned 10 Primetime Emmy Award nominations. He won twice, for Outstanding Television Film for the HBO film The Gathering Storm (2002) and for Outstanding Documentary or Nonfiction Special for the History Channel's Gettysburg (2011). He was Emmy-nominated for RKO 281 (1999), The Andromeda Strain (2008), and The Pillars of the Earth (2010). Along with Hugh Hudson, Adrian Lyne, Alan Parker, and brother Tony, Scott was part of the "Adland Five" of British directors operating in the late 1970s and early 1980s who first established themselves in the advertising world, before going on to Hollywood success. The group's influence has been cited by the likes of Christopher Nolan and Christopher Frayling.

== Early life and education ==
My mum brought three boys up: my dad was in the army and so he was frequently away. During the war and post-war, we tended to travel following him around so my mum was the boss. She laid down the law and the law was God. We just said, "Yup, okay" – we didn't argue. I think that's where the respect has come from, because she was tough.

— A supporter of strong female characters in his work, Scott credits his mother Elizabeth as his first female role model

Scott was born on 30 November 1937 in South Shields, the second of three sons to Francis ("Frank") Percy Scott, a partner in a commercial shipping business based in Newcastle who would serve as a Colonel in the Royal Engineers during the Second World War, and Elizabeth, born Williams, a miner's daughter. His great-uncle Dixon Scott was a pioneer of the cinema chain and opened many cinemas around Tyneside. One of his cinemas, Tyneside Cinema, is still operating in Newcastle and is the last remaining newsreel cinema in the UK.

Born two years before the Second World War began, Scott was brought up in a military family. His father, a senior officer in the Royal Engineers, was absent for most of his early life. His elder brother, Frank, joined the Merchant Navy when he was still young and the pair had little contact. During this time the family moved around; they lived in Cumberland as well as other areas of England, in addition to Wales and Germany, where Colonel Scott was part of the post-war Allied Control Council. After the war the Scott family moved back to County Durham and eventually settled on Teesside.

His interest in science fiction began by reading the novels of H. G. Wells as a child. He was also influenced by science-fiction films such as It! The Terror from Beyond Space, The Day the Earth Stood Still and Them! He said these films "kind of got [him] going a little" but his attention was not fully caught until he saw Stanley Kubrick's 2001: A Space Odyssey, about which he said, "Once I saw that, I knew what I could do." He went to Grangefield Grammar School in Stockton-on-Tees and obtained a diploma in design at West Hartlepool College of Art. While in Stockton during the mid 1950s, he played for Stockton Rugby Football Club. The industrial landscape in West Hartlepool would later inspire visuals in Blade Runner, with Scott stating, "There were steelworks adjacent to West Hartlepool, so every day I'd be going through them, and thinking they're kind of magnificent, beautiful, winter or summer, and the darker and more ominous it got, the more interesting it got."

I use everything I learned every day at art school. It's all about white sheets of paper, pens and drawing.

— Scott speaking about the influence the Royal College of Art has had in designing the visuals for his films

Scott went on to study at the Royal College of Art in London, contributing to the college magazine ARK and helping to establish the college film department. For his final show he made a black and white short film, Boy and Bicycle, starring both his younger brother and his father, which was later released on the 'Extras' section of The Duellists DVD. It was shot in 1960 or 1961 entirely in West Hartlepool. and Seaton Carew. In February 1963 Scott was named in the title credits as designer for the BBC television programme Tonight.

== Career ==
=== 1960s–1970s: Early employment ===
After graduation in 1963 he secured a job as a trainee set designer with the BBC, leading to work on the popular television police series Z-Cars and science fiction series Out of the Unknown. He was originally assigned to design the second Doctor Who serial, The Daleks, which would have entailed realising the serial's eponymous alien creatures. Shortly before he was due to start work, a schedule conflict meant he was replaced by Raymond Cusick. In 1965 he began directing episodes of television series for the BBC, only one of which, an episode of Adam Adamant Lives!, is available commercially.

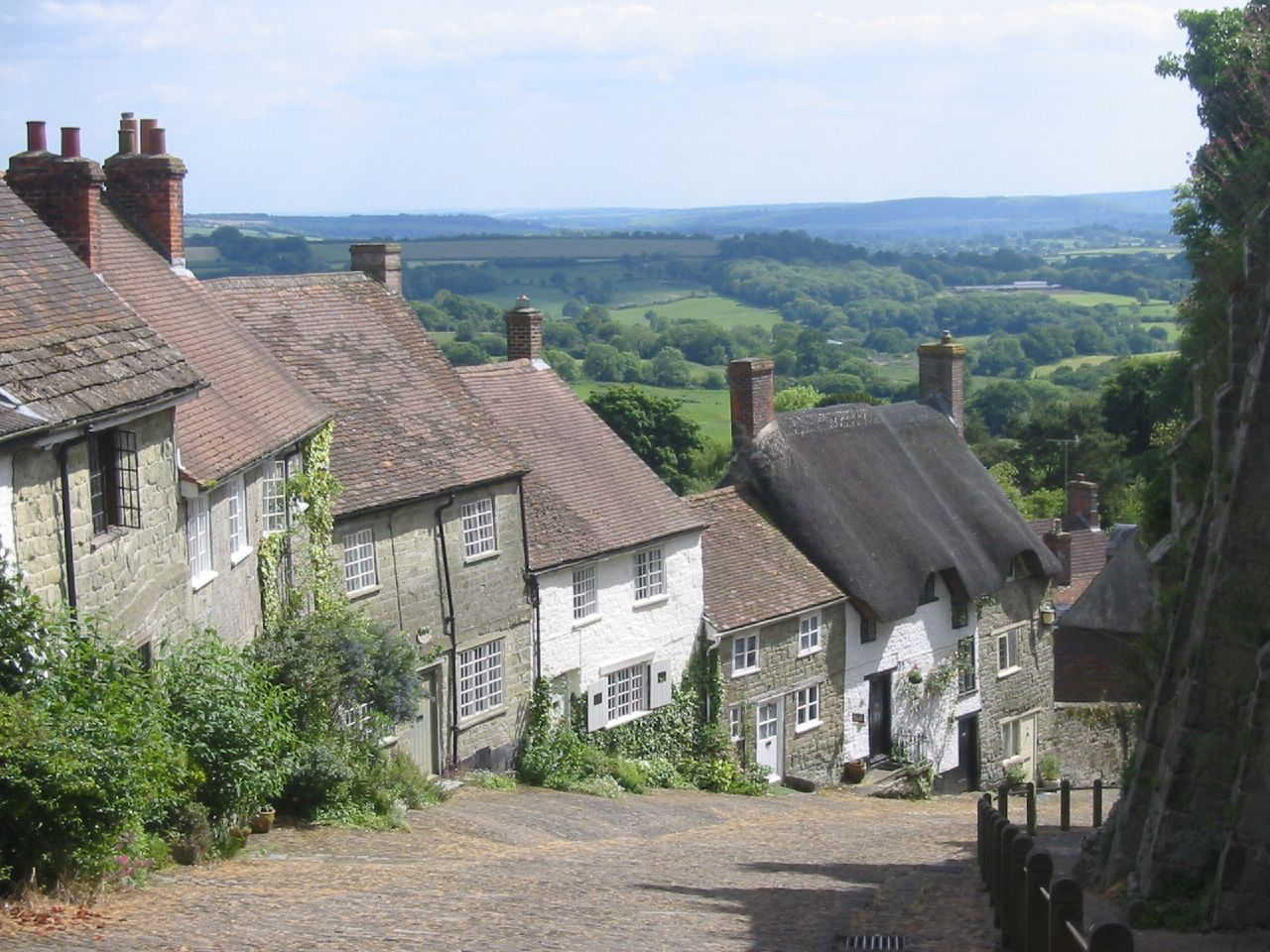
Gold Hill in Shaftesbury, Dorset, where Scott filmed the 1973 Hovis television commercial

In 1968 Ridley and his younger brother, Tony Scott, who would also go on to become a film director, founded Ridley Scott Associates (RSA), a film and commercial production company. Working alongside Alan Parker, Hugh Hudson and cinematographer Hugh Johnson, Ridley Scott made many commercials at RSA during the 1970s, including a 1973 Hovis bread advertisement, "The Bike Ride" (underscored by the slow movement of Dvořák's "New World" symphony rearranged for brass), filmed in Gold Hill, Shaftesbury, Dorset. A nostalgia-themed television advert that captured the public imagination, it was voted the UK's favourite commercial in a 2006 poll. In the 1970s the Chanel No. 5 brand needed revitalisation, having run the risk of being labelled as mass market and passé. Directed by Scott in the 1970s and 1980s, Chanel television commercials were inventive mini-films with production values of surreal fantasy and seduction, which "played on the same visual imagery, with the same silhouette of the bottle."

Five members of the Scott family are directors and all have worked for RSA. His brother Tony was a successful film director whose career spanned more than two decades; his sons, Jake and Luke, are both acclaimed directors of commercials, as is his daughter, Jordan Scott. Jake and Jordan both work from Los Angeles; Luke is based in London. In 1995 Shepperton Studios was purchased by a consortium headed by Ridley and Tony Scott, which extensively renovated the studios while also expanding and improving its grounds.

=== 1970s: The Duellists, Alien ===
The Duellists (1977) marked Ridley Scott's first feature film as director. Shot in continental Europe, it was nominated for the main prize at the Cannes Film Festival, and won an award for Best Debut Film. The Duellists had limited commercial impact internationally. Based on Joseph Conrad's short story "The Duel" and set during the Napoleonic Wars, it follows two French Hussar officers, D'Hubert and Feraud (Keith Carradine and Harvey Keitel) whose quarrel over an initially minor incident turns into a bitter extended feud spanning fifteen years, interwoven with the larger conflict that provides its backdrop. The film has been acclaimed for providing a historically authentic portrayal of Napoleonic uniforms and military conduct. The 2013 release of the film on Blu-ray coincided with the publication of an essay on the film in a collection of scholarly essays on Scott.

Scott had originally planned next to adapt a version of Tristan and Iseult, but after seeing Star Wars, he became convinced of the potential of large-scale, effects-driven films. He accepted the job of directing Alien, the 1979 horror/science-fiction film that would win him international success. Scott made the decision to switch Ellen Ripley from the standard male action hero to a heroine. Ripley (played by Sigourney Weaver), who appeared in the first four Alien films, would become a cinematic icon. The final scene of John Hurt's character has been named by a number of publications as one of the most memorable in cinematic history. Filmed at Shepperton Studios in England, Alien was the sixth highest-grossing film of 1979, earning over $104 million worldwide. Scott was involved in the 2003 restoration and re-release of the original film. In promotional interviews at the time, Scott indicated he had been in discussions to make a fifth film in the Alien franchise. However, in a 2006 interview, Scott remarked that he had been unhappy about Alien: The Director's Cut, feeling that the original was "pretty flawless" and that the additions were merely a marketing tool. Scott later returned to Alien-related projects when he directed Prometheus and Alien: Covenant three decades after the original film's release.

=== 1980s: Blade Runner and other films ===
Outside Star Wars, no sci-fi universe has been etched into cinematic consciousness more thoroughly than Blade Runner. Ridley Scott's definitive 1982 neo-noir offered an immersive dystopia of rain-soaked windows and shadowy buildings adorned with animated neon billboards, where flying cars hum through the endless night.

— Eric Kohn, IndieWire, 2017

After a year working on the film adaptation of Dune, and following the sudden death of his brother Frank, Scott signed to direct the film version of Philip K. Dick's novel Do Androids Dream of Electric Sheep? Re-titled Blade Runner and starring Harrison Ford, the film was a commercial disappointment in theatres in 1982, and was criticised by Pauline Kael in The New Yorker who wrote "...Scott doesn't seem to have a grasp of how to use words as part of the way a movie moves. "Blade Runner" is a suspenseless thriller; it appears to be a victim of its own imaginative use of hardware and miniatures and mattes. At some point, Scott and the others must have decided that the story was unimportant; maybe the booming, lewd and sultry score by Chariots-for-Hire Vangelis that seems to come out of the smoke convinced them that the audience would be moved even if vital parts of the story were trimmed."

In response to the review, Scott said: "...It was four pages of destruction. I never met her. I was so offended. I framed those pages and they've been in my office for 30 years to remind me there's only one critic that counts and that's you. I haven't read critiques ever since. Because if it's a good one, you can get a swollen head and forget yourself. And if it's a bad one, you're so depressed that it's debilitating." The movie is now widely regarded as a classic. In 1991, Scott's notes were used by Warner Bros. to create a rushed director's cut which removed the main character's voiceover and made a number of other small changes, including to the ending. Later Scott personally supervised a digital restoration of Blade Runner and approved what was called The Final Cut. This version was released in Los Angeles, New York City, and Toronto cinemas on 5 October 2007, and as an elaborate DVD release in December 2007.

Today, Blade Runner is ranked by many critics as one of the most important and influential science fiction films ever made, partly thanks to its much imitated portraits of a future cityscape. It is often discussed along with William Gibson's novel Neuromancer as initiating the cyberpunk genre. Stephen Minger, stem cell biologist at King's College London, states, "It was so far ahead of its time and the whole premise of the story – what is it to be human and who are we, where we come from? It's the age-old questions." Scott has described Blade Runner as his "most complete and personal film".

In 1985, Scott directed Legend, a fantasy film produced by Arnon Milchan. Scott decided to create a "once upon a time" tale set in a world of princesses, unicorns and goblins, filming almost entirely inside the studio. Scott cast Tom Cruise as the film's hero, Jack; Mia Sara as Princess Lili; and Tim Curry as the Satan-horned Lord of Darkness. Scott had a forest set built on the 007 Stage at Pinewood Studios in Buckinghamshire, with trees 60 feet high and trunks 30 feet in diameter. In the final stages of filming, the forest set was destroyed by fire; Jerry Goldsmith's original score was used for European release, but replaced in North America with a score by Tangerine Dream. Rob Bottin provided the film's Academy Award-nominated special make-up effects, most notably Curry's red-coloured Satan figure. Despite being a major commercial failure on release, the film has gone on to become a cult classic. The 2002 Director's Cut restored Goldsmith's original score.

Scott made Someone to Watch Over Me, a romantic thriller starring Tom Berenger and Mimi Rogers in 1987, and Black Rain (1989), a police drama starring Michael Douglas and Andy García, shot partially in Japan. The latter was very well received at the box office. Black Rain was the first of Scott's six collaborations with the composer Hans Zimmer.

==== 1984 Apple Macintosh commercial ====
In 1984, Scott collaborated with Apple Inc. to direct a big-budget ($900,000) television commercial, "1984", to launch Apple Computer's Macintosh computer. Scott filmed the advertisement in England for about $370,000; which was given a showcase airing in the US on 22 January 1984, during Super Bowl XVIII, alongside screenings in theatres. The advertisement was considered a "watershed event" in advertising by USA Today and a "masterpiece" by CNN. Advertising Age placed it top of its list of the 50 greatest commercials.

Set in a dystopian future modelled after George Orwell's Nineteen Eighty-Four, Scott's advertisement used its hero (portrayed by English athlete Anya Major) to represent the coming of the Macintosh (indicated by her white tank top adorned with a picture of the Apple Macintosh computer) as a means of saving humanity from "conformity" (Big Brother), an allusion to IBM, at that time the dominant force in computing.

=== 1990s ===
The road film Thelma & Louise (1991) starring Geena Davis as Thelma, Susan Sarandon as Louise, in addition to the breakthrough role for Brad Pitt as J.D, proved to be one of Scott's biggest critical successes, helping revive the director's reputation and receiving his first nomination for the Academy Award for Best Director. His next project, independently funded historical epic 1492: Conquest of Paradise, was a box-office failure. The film recounts the expeditions to the Americas by Christopher Columbus (French star Gérard Depardieu). Scott did not release another film for four years.

In 1995 Ridley and his brother Tony formed a production company, Scott Free Productions, in Los Angeles. All Ridley's subsequent feature films, starting with White Squall (starring Jeff Bridges) and G.I. Jane (starring Demi Moore), have been produced under the Scott Free banner. In 1995 the two brothers purchased a controlling interest in the British film studio Shepperton Studios. In 2001 Shepperton merged with Pinewood Studios to become The Pinewood Studios Group, which has its headquarters in Buckinghamshire, England.

=== 2000s ===
Scott's historical drama Gladiator (2000) proved to be one of his biggest critical and commercial successes. It won five Academy Awards, including Best Picture and Best Actor for the film's star Russell Crowe, and saw Scott nominated for the Academy Award for Best Director. Scott collaborated with British visual effects and animation company The Mill for the film's computer-generated imagery, and the film was dedicated to Oliver Reed, who died during filming – The Mill created a digital body double for Reed's remaining scenes. Some have credited Gladiator with reviving the nearly defunct "sword and sandal" historical genre. The film was named the fifth best action film of all time in the ABC special Best in Film: The Greatest Movies of Our Time.

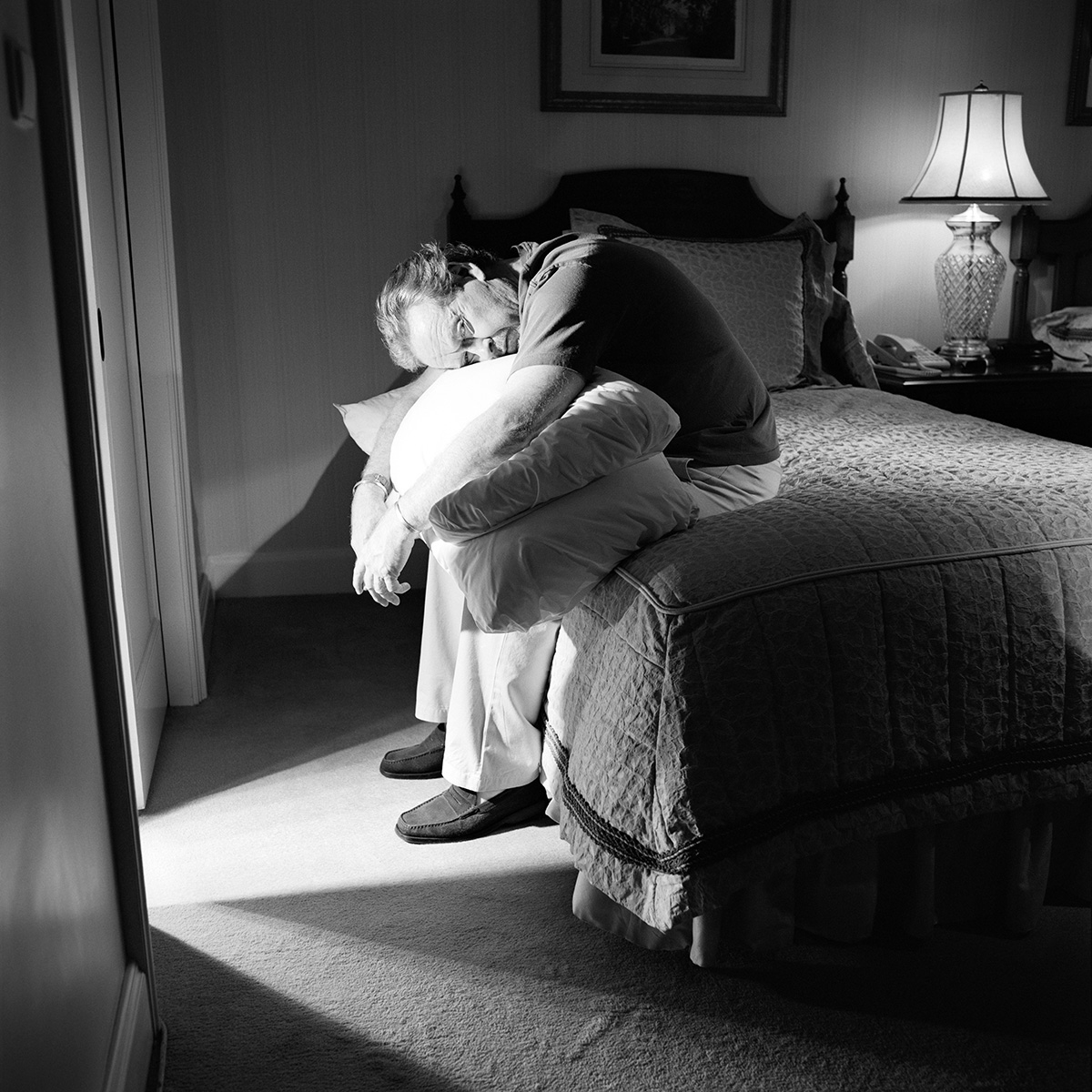
Portrait of Scott in Berlin in 2005 by German photographer Oliver Mark

Scott directed Hannibal (2001) starring Anthony Hopkins as Hannibal Lecter. The film was commercially successful despite receiving mixed reviews. Scott's next film, Black Hawk Down (2002), featuring Tom Hardy in his film debut, was based on a group of stranded US soldiers fighting for their lives in Somalia, Scott was nominated for an Academy Award for Best Director. In 2003, Scott directed a smaller scale project, Matchstick Men, adapted from the novel by Eric Garcia and starring Nicolas Cage, Sam Rockwell and Alison Lohman. It received mostly positive reviews but performed moderately at the box office.

In 2005 Scott made the modestly successful Kingdom of Heaven, a film about the Crusades. The film starred Orlando Bloom and marked Scott's first collaboration with the composer Harry Gregson-Williams. The Moroccan government sent the Moroccan cavalry as extras for some battle scenes. Unhappy with the theatrical version of Kingdom of Heaven (which he blamed on paying too much attention to the opinions of preview audiences in addition to relenting when Fox wanted 45 minutes shaved off), Scott supervised a director's cut of the film, the true version of what he wanted, which was released on DVD in 2006. The director's cut of Kingdom of Heaven has been met with critical acclaim, with Empire magazine calling the film an "epic", adding: "The added 45 minutes in the director's cut are like pieces missing from a beautiful but incomplete puzzle." "This is the one that should have gone out" reflected Scott. Asked if he was against previewing in general in 2006, Scott stated: "It depends who's in the driving seat. If you've got a lunatic doing my job, then you need to preview. But a good director should be experienced enough to judge what he thinks is the correct version to go out into the cinema."

Scott collaborated again with Gladiator star Russell Crowe for A Good Year, based on the best-selling book by Peter Mayle about an investment banker who finds a new life in Provence. The film was released on 10 November 2006. A few days later Rupert Murdoch, chairman of studio 20th Century Fox (who backed the film), dismissed A Good Year as "a flop" at a shareholders' meeting.

Scott's next film was American Gangster, based on the story of real-life drug kingpin Frank Lucas. Scott took over the project in early 2006 and had screenwriter Steven Zaillian rewrite his script to focus on the dynamic between Frank Lucas and Richie Roberts. Denzel Washington signed on to the project as Lucas, with Russell Crowe costarring as Roberts. The film premiered in November 2007 to positive reviews and box office success and Scott was nominated for a Golden Globe for Best Director.

In late 2008 Scott's espionage thriller Body of Lies, starring Leonardo DiCaprio and Russell Crowe, opened to lukewarm ticket sales and mixed reviews. Scott directed a remake adaptation of Robin Hood, which starred Russell Crowe as Robin Hood and Cate Blanchett as Maid Marian. It was released in May 2010 to mixed reviews but a respectable box office.

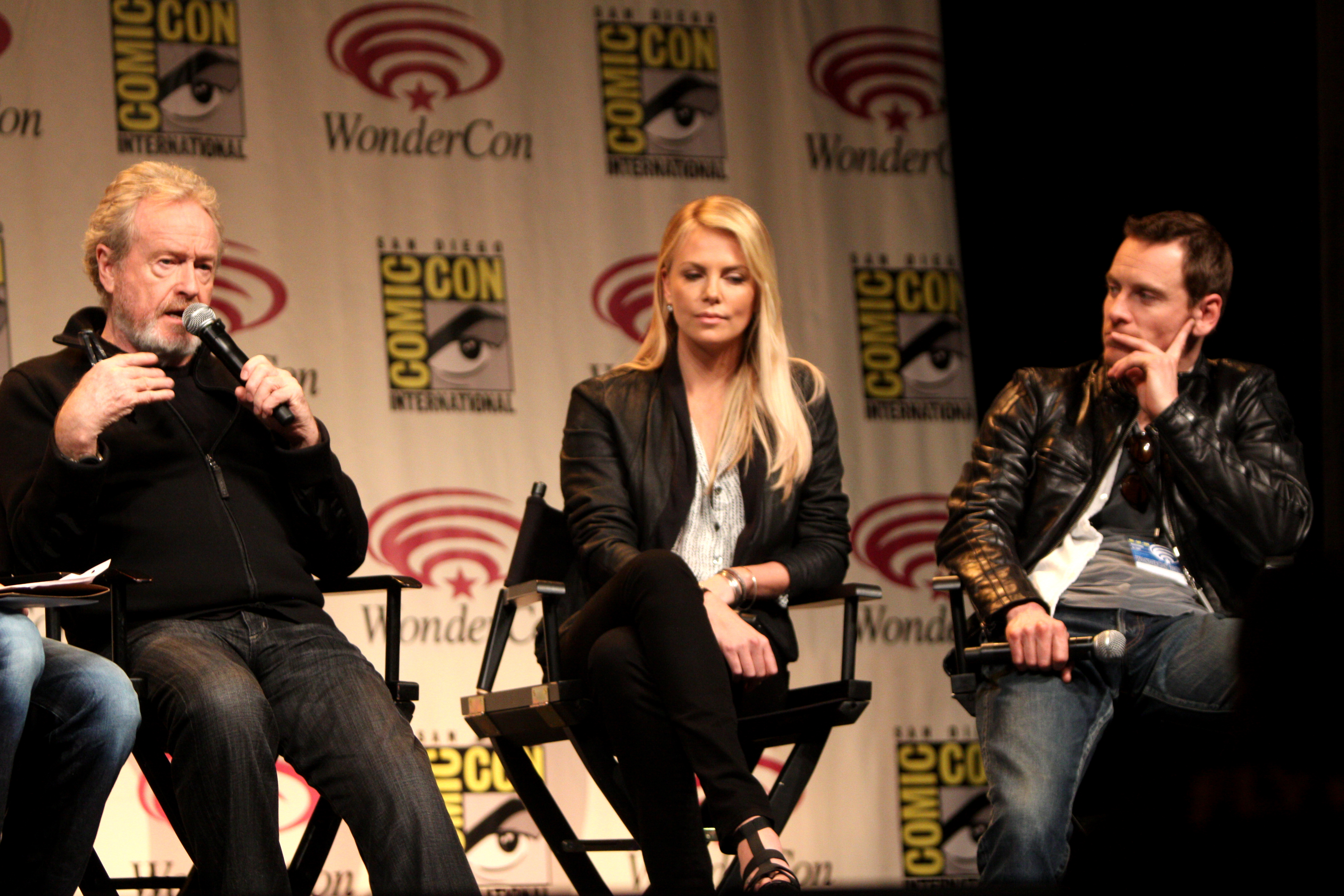
Scott speaking with Prometheus stars Charlize Theron and Michael Fassbender at Wondercon 2012 in Anaheim, California on 17 March 2012

On 31 July 2009 news surfaced of a two-part prequel to Alien with Scott attached to direct. The project, ultimately reduced to a single film called Prometheus, which Scott described as sharing "strands of Alien's DNA" while not being a direct prequel, was released in June 2012. The film starred Charlize Theron and Michael Fassbender, with Noomi Rapace playing the leading role of the scientist named Elizabeth Shaw. The film received mostly positive reviews and grossed $403 million at the box office.

In August 2009 Scott planned to direct an adaptation of Aldous Huxley's Brave New World set in a dystopian London with Leonardo DiCaprio. In 2009, the TV series The Good Wife premiered with Ridley and his brother Tony credited as executive producers.

=== 2010s ===
On 6 July 2010, YouTube announced the launch of Life in a Day, an experimental documentary executive produced by Scott. Released at the Sundance Film Festival on 27 January 2011, it incorporates footage shot on 24 July 2010 submitted by YouTube users from around the world. As part of the buildup to the 2012 London Olympics, Scott produced Britain in a Day, a documentary film consisting of footage shot by the British public on 12 November 2011.

In 2012, Scott produced the commercial for Lady Gaga's fragrance, "Fame". It was touted as the first-ever black Eau de Parfum, in the informal credits attached to the trailer for this advertisement. On 24 June 2013, Scott's series Crimes of the Century debuted on CNN. In November 2012 it was announced that Scott would produce the documentary, Springsteen & I directed by Baillie Walsh and inspired by Life in a Day, which Scott also produced. The film featured fan footage from throughout the world on what musician Bruce Springsteen meant to them and how he impacted their lives. The film was released for one day only in 50 countries and on over 2000 film screens on 22 July 2013.

Scott directed The Counselor (2013), with a screenplay by author Cormac McCarthy. On 25 October 2013, Indiewire reported that "Before McCarthy sold his first spec script for Scott's (The Counselor) film, the director was heavily involved in developing an adaptation of the author's 1985 novel Blood Meridian with screenwriter Bill Monahan (The Departed). But as Scott said in a Time Out interview, '[Studios] didn't want to make it. The book is so uncompromising, which is what's great about it.' Described as an 'anti-western'..." Scott directed the biblically inspired epic film Exodus: Gods and Kings, released in December 2014 which received negative reviews from critics (particularly for the casting of white actors as Middle Eastern characters) and grossed $268 million worldwide on a $140 million budget, making it a financial disappointment. Filmed at Pinewood Studios in Buckinghamshire, the film starred Christian Bale in the lead role.

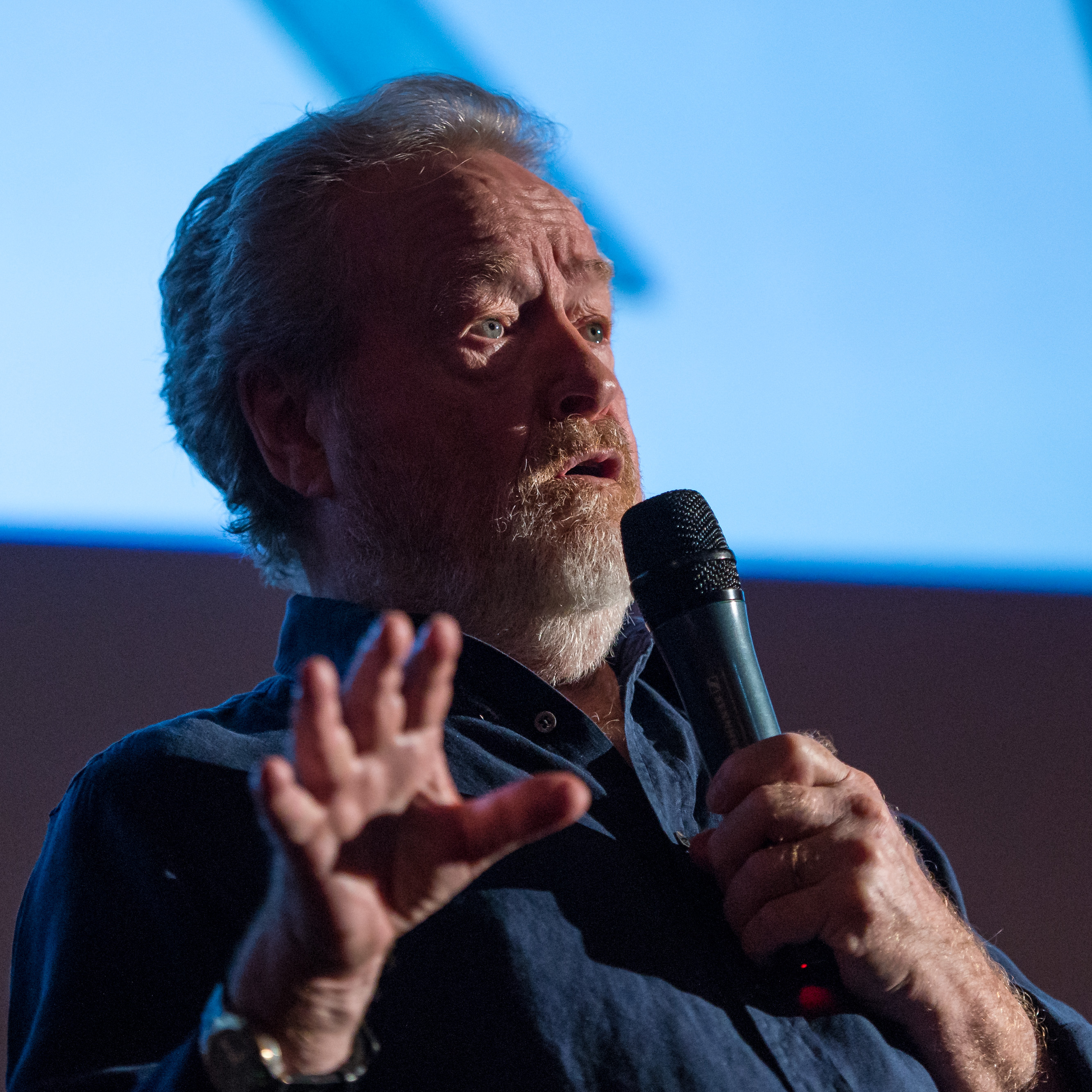
Scott participates in a question and answer session about NASA's journey to Mars and his film The Martian, 18 August 2015.

In May 2014, Scott began negotiations to direct The Martian, starring Matt Damon as Mark Watney. Like many of Scott's previous works, The Martian features a heroine in the form of Jessica Chastain's character who is the mission commander. The film was originally scheduled for release on 25 November 2015, but Fox later switched its release date with that of Victor Frankenstein, and thus The Martian was released on 2 October 2015. The Martian was a critical and commercial success, grossed over $630 million worldwide, becoming Scott's highest-grossing film to date.

A sequel to Prometheus, Alien: Covenant, started filming in 2016, premiered in London on 4 May 2017, and received general release on 19 May 2017. The film received generally positive reviews from critics, with many praising Michael Fassbender's dual performance and calling the film a return to form for both director Ridley Scott and the franchise.

In August 2011, information leaked about production of a sequel to Blade Runner by Alcon Entertainment, with Alcon partners Broderick Johnson and Andrew Kosove. Scott informed the Variety publication in November 2014 that he was no longer the director for the film and would only fulfill a producer's role. Scott also revealed that filming would begin sometime within 2015, and that Harrison Ford has signed on to reprise his role from the original film but his character should only appear in "the third act" of the sequel. On 26 February 2015, the sequel was officially confirmed, with Denis Villeneuve hired to direct the film, and Scott being an executive producer. The sequel, Blade Runner 2049, was released on 6 October 2017 to universal acclaim.

From May to August 2017, Scott filmed All the Money in the World, a drama about the kidnapping of John Paul Getty III, starring Mark Wahlberg and Michelle Williams. Kevin Spacey originally portrayed Getty Sr. However, after multiple sexual assault allegations against the actor, Scott decided to replace him with Christopher Plummer, saying "You can't condone that kind of behaviour in any shape or form. We cannot let one person's action affect the good work of all these other people. It's that simple." Scott began re-shooting Spacey's scenes with Plummer on 20 November, which included filming at Elveden Hall in west Suffolk, England. With a release date of 25 December 2017, the film studio had its doubts that Scott would manage it, saying: "They were like, 'You'll never do it. God be with you.'"

=== 2020s ===
In 2020, Scott directed The Last Duel, a film adaptation of Eric Jager's 2004 book The Last Duel: A True Story of Crime, Scandal, and Trial by Combat in Medieval France, starring Adam Driver, Matt Damon and Jodie Comer which was released on 15 October 2021 to positive reviews but it bombed at the box office, grossing only $30.6 million against a production budget of $100 million. Filming locations included the French medieval castle of Berzé-le-Châtel (with a film crew of 300 people including 100 extras), and Ireland. He directed House of Gucci, a film about the murder of Maurizio Gucci orchestrated by Patrizia Reggiani, who were portrayed by Adam Driver and Lady Gaga, respectively. Scott had originally been set to direct the film in 2006, but the project languished in development hell for several years, with different directors entering talks to sign on, before he returned to the project in November 2019. The film was released on 24 November 2021.

Scott next directed Napoleon, a biopic of Napoleon Bonaparte starring Joaquin Phoenix as Napoleon and Vanessa Kirby as Empress Joséphine, the first wife of Napoleon. Filming began in February 2022; the film was released on 22 November 2023 by Sony Pictures Releasing before streaming on Apple TV+ on 1 March 2024. Scott's next film was Gladiator II, a sequel to Gladiator, starring Paul Mescal, Denzel Washington, and Pedro Pascal. The film, which began production in June 2023 but had been discussed since early 2001, was released on 22 November 2024. Also, in November 2024, Scott was announced to be directing the post-apocalyptic film The Dog Stars for 20th Century Studios, based on the Peter Heller novel of the same name. Principal photography commenced by April 2025 in Italy, with Jacob Elordi, Josh Brolin, Margaret Qualley starring. The film was released in theatres on August 28, 2026.

=== Upcoming projects ===
In an interview with The Times, the 88-year-old director revealed that in addition to a pirate film (Treasure Island), a western, a World War I epic, a Bee Gees musical and a film about banking, he also has a "marvellous film about the African Elephant" in development.

=== Television projects ===
In 2002, Ridley Scott and his brother Tony were among the executive producers of The Gathering Storm, a television biographical film of Winston Churchill in the years just prior to World War II. A BBC–HBO co-production, it received acclaim, with Mark Lawson of The Guardian ranking it as the most memorable television portrayal of Churchill. The brothers produced the CBS series Numb3rs (2005–10), a crime drama about a genius mathematician who helps the FBI solve crimes; and The Good Wife (2009–2016), a legal drama about an attorney balancing her job with her husband, a former state attorney trying to rebuild his political career after a major scandal. The two Scotts also produced a 2010 film adaptation of 1980s television show The A-Team, directed by Joe Carnahan.

In 2012, Showtime ordered Paul Attanasio's series The Vatican, with a pilot directed by Scott. The series would be executive-produced by Attanasio, Scott and David W. Zucker; Kyle Chandler was cast as Cardinal Thomas Duffy, Matthew Goode as Papal Secretary Bernd Koch, Bruno Ganz as Pope Sixtus VI, Anna Friel, Rebecca Ferguson, Sebastian Koch and Ewen Bremner as the leads. The episode shot was shot, but, by the following year, Showtime had chosen not to greenlight it to series. In January 2014, Showtime president David Nevins said this about the cancellation: "One of the fundamental issues with The Vatican is that the world changed on us. That show was conceived and written while Pope Benedict was still in charge of the Vatican, and it was conceived in a world that now would feel very dated."

Scott was an executive producer of the first season of Amazon's The Man in the High Castle (2015–16). Through Scott Free Productions, he is an executive producer on the dark comic science-fiction series BrainDead which debuted on CBS in 2016.

On 20 November 2017, Amazon agreed a deal with AMC Studios for a worldwide release of The Terror, Scott's series adaptation of Dan Simmons' novel, a speculative retelling of British explorer Sir John Franklin's lost expedition of HMS Erebus and HMS Terror to the Arctic in 1845–1848 to force the Northwest Passage, with elements of horror and supernatural fiction, and the series premiered in March 2018. Scott was an executive producer for the 2019 BBC/FX three-part miniseries A Christmas Carol, developed by Steven Knight, alongside Tom Hardy.

Scott's first television directing role in 50 years, Raised by Wolves, was released on HBO Max in 2020. Scott said his "tendency was to think, 'I don't want to go down that road of androids again'", but decided to take on the project after he read the script and liked it. The show revolves around androids Mother and Father, who attempt to save humankind on planet Kepler-22b after earth is demolished by war between the Mithraic, who follow a god called Sol, and militant atheists.

In August 2022, it was announced Scott would executive produce the Apple TV+ series Dope Thief, written by Peter Craig and starring Brian Tyree Henry and Wagner Moura, and would also direct an episode; initially titled Sinking Spring, the series would premiere in March 2025.

== Personal life ==
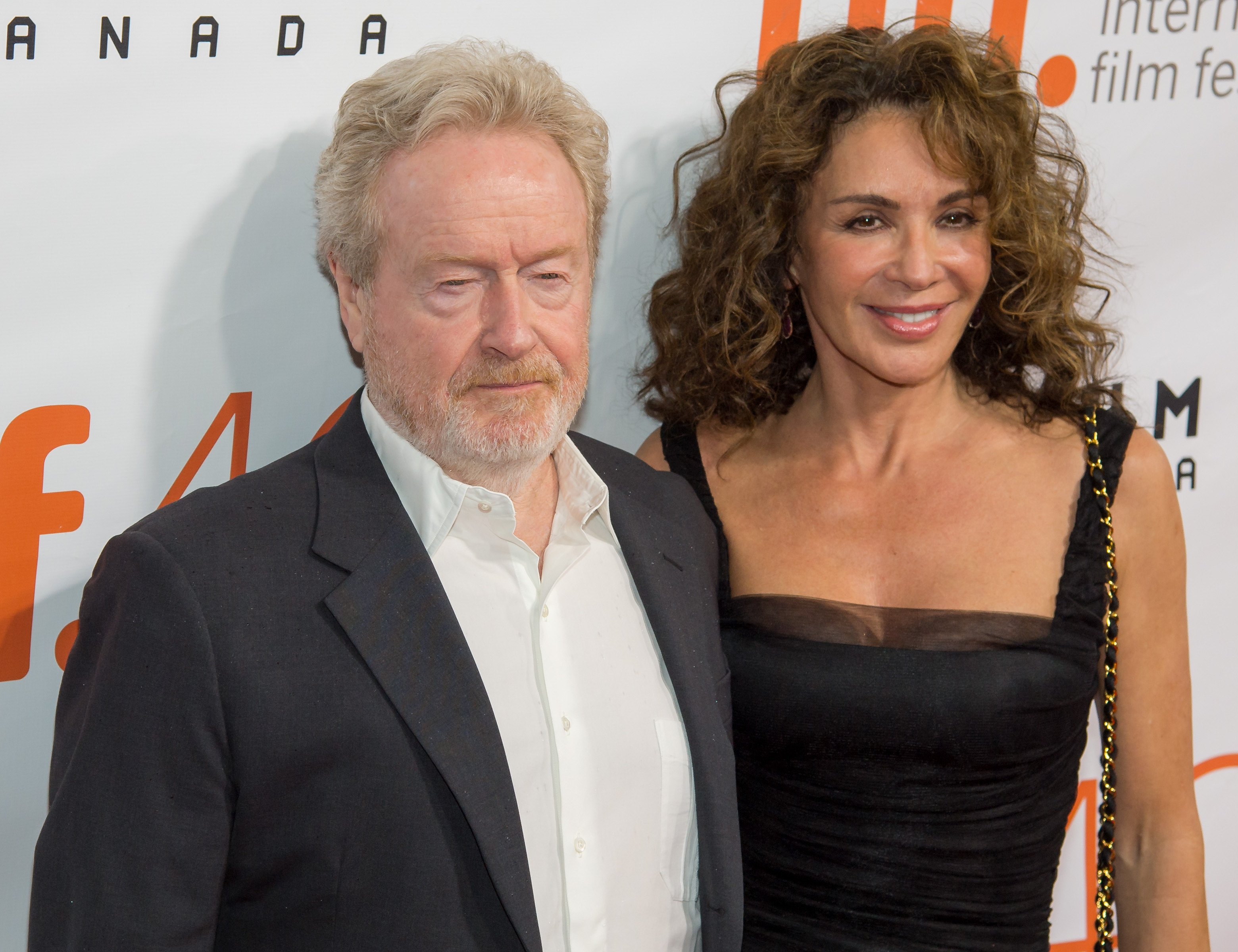
Scott with his third wife Giannina Facio at the world premiere of The Martian held at the Toronto International Film Festival on 11 September 2015

Scott was married to Felicity Heywood from 1964 to 1975. The couple had two sons, Jake and Luke, both of whom work as directors in Scott's production company, Ridley Scott Associates. Scott later married advertising executive Sandy Watson in 1979, with whom he had a daughter, Jordan Scott, also a director, and divorced in 1989. In 2015 he married actress Giannina Facio, whom he has cast in all his films since White Squall except American Gangster and The Martian. He divides his time between homes in London, France, and Los Angeles.

His eldest brother Frank died, aged 45, of skin cancer in 1980. His younger brother Tony, who was also his business partner in their company Scott Free, died on 19 August 2012 at the age of 68 after jumping from the Vincent Thomas Bridge which spans Los Angeles Harbor, after an originally disputed long struggle with cancer. Before Tony's death, he and Ridley collaborated on a miniseries based on Robin Cook's novel Coma for A&E. The two-part miniseries premiered on A&E on 3 September 2012, to mixed reviews.

Scott has dedicated several of his films in memory of his family: Blade Runner to his brother Frank, Black Hawk Down to his mother, and The Counselor and Exodus: Gods and Kings to his brother Tony. Ridley also paid tribute to his late brother Tony at the 2016 Golden Globes, after his film, The Martian, won Best Motion Picture – Musical or Comedy.

In 2013 Scott told The New York Times that he was an atheist. Although when asked by the BBC, in a September 2014 interview, if he believed in God, Scott replied:

I'm not sure. I think there's all kinds of questions raised... that's such an exotic question. If we looked at the whole thing practically speaking, the Big Bang occurred and then we go through this evolution of millions, billions of years where, by coincidence, all the right biological accidents came out the right way. To an extent, that doesn't make sense unless there was a controlling decider or mediator in all of that. So who was that? Or what was that? Are we one big grand experiment in the basic overall blink of the universe, or the galaxy? In which case, who is behind it?

== Directorial style ==
Scott's once frequent collaborator Russell Crowe commented, "I like being on Ridley's set because actors can perform [...] and the focus is on the performers." Paul M. Sammon, in his book Future Noir: The Making of Blade Runner, commented in an interview with Brmovie.com that Scott's relationship with his actors has improved considerably over the years. More recently during the filming of Scott's 2012 film, Prometheus, Charlize Theron praised the director's willingness to listen to suggestions from the cast for improvements in the way their characters are portrayed on screen. Theron worked alongside the writers and Scott to give more depth to her character during filming. When working on epics, Scott states, "there's always the danger that the characters can get swamped" on a large canvas, before adding, "My model is David Lean, whose characters never got lost in the proscenium."

Scott's work is identified for its striking visuals, with heroines also a common theme. Los Angeles Times film editor Joshua Rothkopf wrote "Scott may be the movies' most consistent stealth feminist". His visual style, incorporating a detailed approach to production design and innovative, atmospheric lighting, has been influential on a subsequent generation of filmmakers. James Cameron commented, "I love Ridley's films and I love his filmmaking, I love the beauty of the photography, I love the visceral sense that you're there, that you're present." Scott commonly uses slow pacing until the action sequences. Examples include Alien and Blade Runner; the Los Angeles Times critic Sheila Benson, for example, would call the latter "Blade Crawler" "because it's so damn slow". Scott claims to have an eidetic memory, which he says aids him in visualising and storyboarding the scenes in his films.

Scott has developed a method for filming intricate shots as swiftly as possible: "I like working, always, with a minimum of three cameras. [...] So those 50 set-ups [a day] might only be 25 set-ups except I'm covering in the set-up. So you're finished. I mean, if you take a little bit more time to prep on three cameras, or if it's a big stunt, eleven cameras, and – whilst it may take 45 minutes to set up – then when you're ready you say 'Action!', and you do three takes, two takes and is everybody happy? You say, 'Yeah, that's it.' So you move on."

Artificial intelligence is a theme that appears in several of Scott's films, including Blade Runner, Alien, and Prometheus. The 2013 book The Culture and Philosophy of Ridley Scott identifies pioneering computer scientist Alan Turing and the philosopher John Searle as presenting relevant models of testing artificial intelligence known as the Turing test and the Chinese Room Thought Experiment, respectively, in the chapter titled "What's Wrong with Building Replicants", which has been a recurring theme for many of Scott's films. The chapter titled "Artificial Intelligence in Blade Runner, Alien, and Prometheus," concludes by citing the writings of John Stuart Mill in the context of Scott's Nexus-6 Replicants in Blade Runner (Rutger Hauer), the android Ash (Ian Holm) in Alien, and the android David 8 (Michael Fassbender) in Prometheus, where Mill is applied to assert that measures and tests of intelligence must also assess actions and moral behaviour in androids to effectively address the themes which Scott explores in these films.

=== DVD format and director's cut ===
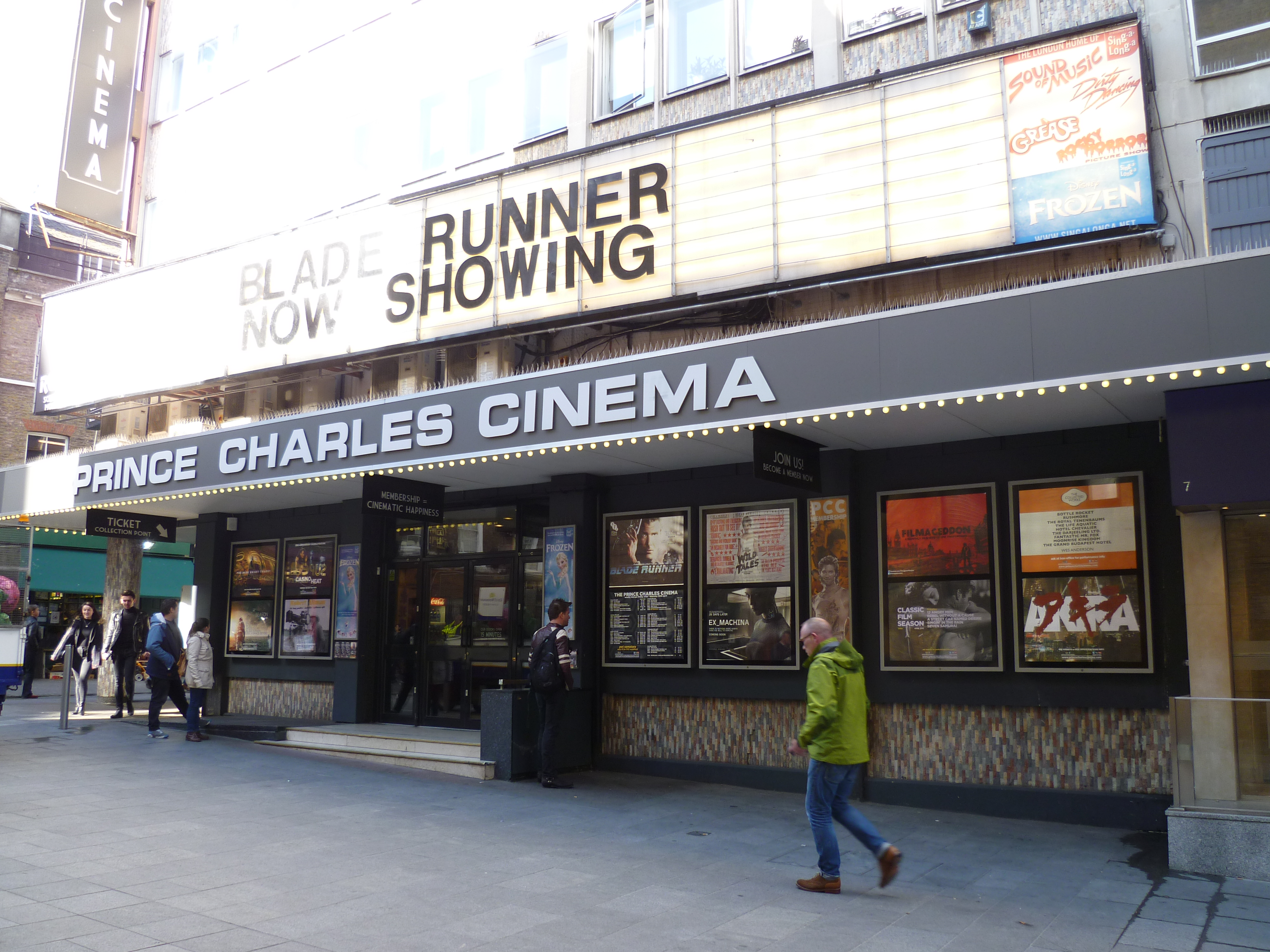
Blade Runner: The Final Cut showing at Prince Charles Cinema in Leicester Square, London in 2015

Scott provides audio commentaries and interviews for all his films where possible. In the July 2006 issue of Total Film magazine, he stated: "After all the work we go through, to have it run in the theater and then disappear forever is a great pity. To give the film added life is really cool for both those who missed it and those who really loved it."

The positive reaction to the Blade Runner Director's Cut encouraged Scott to re-cut several movies that were a disappointment at the time of their release (including Legend and Kingdom of Heaven), which have been met with acclaim. Today the practice of alternative cuts is more commonplace, though often as a way to make a film stand out in the DVD marketplace by adding new material.

== Filmography ==
Directed features
Year	Title	Distributor
1977	The Duellists	Paramount Pictures
1979	Alien	20th Century Fox
1982	Blade Runner	Warner Bros. Pictures
1985	Legend	Universal Pictures / 20th Century Fox
1987	Someone to Watch Over Me	Columbia Pictures
1989	Black Rain	Paramount Pictures
1991	Thelma & Louise	Metro-Goldwyn-Mayer
1992	1492: Conquest of Paradise	Paramount Pictures
1996	White Squall	Buena Vista Pictures
1997	G.I. Jane	Buena Vista Pictures
2000	Gladiator	DreamWorks Pictures / Universal Pictures
2001	Hannibal	Metro-Goldwyn-Mayer / Universal Pictures
2001	Black Hawk Down	Sony Pictures Releasing
2003	Matchstick Men	Warner Bros. Pictures / ImageMovers
2005	Kingdom of Heaven	20th Century Fox
2006	A Good Year	20th Century Fox
2007	American Gangster	Universal Pictures
2008	Body of Lies	Warner Bros. Pictures
2010	Robin Hood	Universal Pictures / Imagine Entertainment
2012	Prometheus	20th Century Fox
2013	The Counselor	20th Century Fox
2014	Exodus: Gods and Kings	20th Century Fox
2015	The Martian	20th Century Fox
2017	Alien: Covenant	20th Century Fox
2017	All the Money in the World	Sony Pictures Releasing / STX Entertainment
2021	The Last Duel	20th Century Studios
2021	House of Gucci	United Artists Releasing
2023	Napoleon	Sony Pictures Releasing / Apple TV+
2024	Gladiator II	Paramount Pictures
2026	The Dog Stars	20th Century Studios
2027	Treasure Island	Sony Pictures Releasing

== Honours, awards and legacy ==
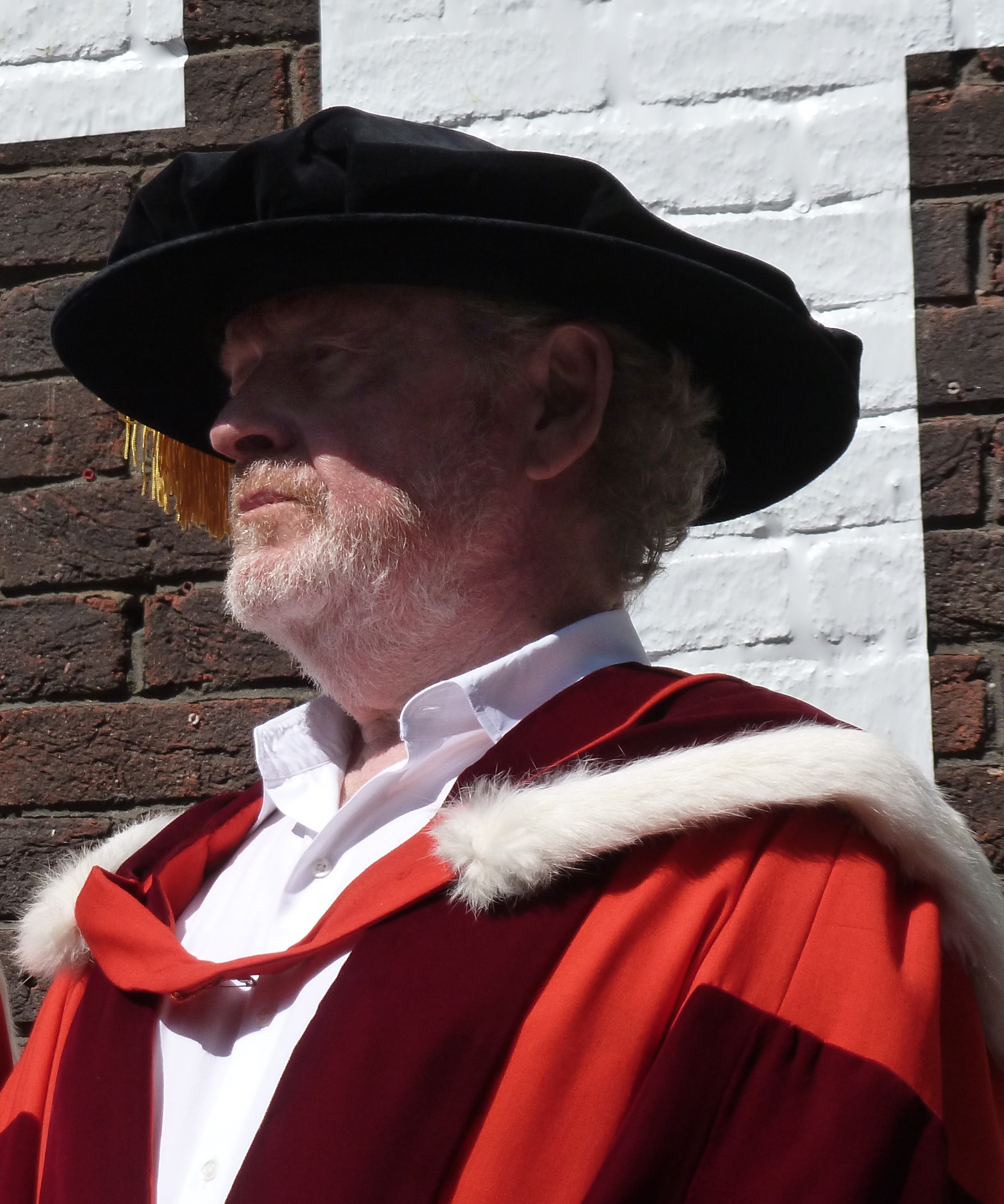
Sir Ridley Scott was made an Honorary Doctor at the Royal College of Art during a ceremony in July 2015.

Scott was knighted in the 2003 New Year Honours "for services to the British film industry". He received his accolade from Queen Elizabeth II at an investiture ceremony at Buckingham Palace on 8 July 2003. Scott admitted feeling "stunned and truly humbled" after the ceremony, saying, "As a boy growing up in South Shields, I could never have imagined that I would receive such a special recognition. I am truly humbled to receive this treasured award and believe it also further recognises the excellence of the British film industry." In the 2024 New Year Honours, he was appointed a Knight Grand Cross of the Order of the British Empire (GBE) by King Charles III also "for services to the UK film industry".

Scott has been nominated for three Academy Awards for Directing—Thelma & Louise, Gladiator and Black Hawk Down—as well as three British Academy Film Awards for Best Director, four Golden Globe Awards for Best Director, and two Primetime Emmy Awards. In 1995, Ridley and his brother Tony received the BAFTA for Outstanding British Contribution To Cinema. In 2018 he received the highest accolade from BAFTA, the BAFTA Fellowship, for lifetime achievement. In 2026, he was announced as the recipient of an Academy Honorary Award.

Scott was inducted into the Science Fiction Hall of Fame in 2007. In 2017 the German newspaper FAZ compared Scott's influence on the science fiction film genre to Sir Alfred Hitchcock's on thrillers and John Ford's on Westerns. In 2011, he received a star on the Hollywood Walk of Fame.

Scott has received three Hugo Awards in the category of Best Dramatic Presentation for Alien, Blade Runner and The Martian. In 2012, Scott was among the British cultural icons selected by artist Sir Peter Blake to appear in a new version of his most famous artwork, The Beatles' Sgt. Pepper's Lonely Hearts Club Band album cover, to celebrate the British cultural figures of his life that he most admires to mark his 80th birthday. On 3 July 2015, he was awarded an honorary doctorate by the Royal College of Art in a ceremony at the Royal Albert Hall in London at which he described how he still keeps on his office wall his school report placing him 31st out of 31 in his class, and how his teacher encouraged him to pursue what became his passion at art school.

In 2024, filmmaker Christopher Nolan wrote about Scott's influence, "Despite all his success, [Ridley] Scott's contribution to the evolution of cinematic storytelling has never been properly acknowledged. Visual innovations he and fellow directors from the British adland of the 1970s brought to cinema were often dismissed as superficial, but critics of the time missed the point — the lavish photography and meticulous design brought new depth to the visual language of movies, mise-en-scène that could tell us what the worlds they portrayed might feel like."

Belgian bike manufacturing company Ridley Bikes is named in honour of Scott.

Awards and nominations received by Scott's films
Year	Title	Academy Awards		BAFTA Awards		Golden Globe Awards	
Year	Title	Nominations	Wins	Nominations	Wins	Nominations	Wins
1977	The Duellists			2			
1979	Alien	2	1	7	2	1	
1982	Blade Runner	2		8	3	1	
1985	Legend	1		3			
1989	Black Rain	2					
1991	Thelma & Louise	6	1	8		4	1
1992	1492: Conquest of Paradise					1	
2000	Gladiator	12	5	14	4	5	2
2001	Black Hawk Down	4	2	3			
2007	American Gangster	2		5		3	
2012	Prometheus	1		1			
2015	The Martian	7		6		3	2
2017	All the Money in the World	1		1		3	
2021	House of Gucci	1		3		1	
2023	Napoleon	3		4			
2024	Gladiator II	1		3		2	
Total		45	9	68	9	25	5

Directed Academy Award performances
Under Scott's direction, these actors have received Academy Award nominations (and one win) for their performances in their respective roles.

Year	Performer	Film	Result
Academy Award for Best Actor
2000	Russell Crowe	Gladiator	Won
2015	Matt Damon	The Martian	Nominated
Academy Award for Best Actress
1991	Geena Davis	Thelma and Louise	Nominated
1991	Susan Sarandon	Thelma and Louise	Nominated
Academy Award for Best Supporting Actor
2000	Joaquin Phoenix	Gladiator	Nominated
2017	Christopher Plummer	All the Money in the World	Nominated
Academy Award for Best Supporting Actress
2007	Ruby Dee	American Gangster	Nominated

== See also ==
- Ridley Scott's unrealised projects
- List of British film directors
- List of Academy Award winners and nominees from Great Britain
