= Benjamin Ross =

British film director (born 1964)

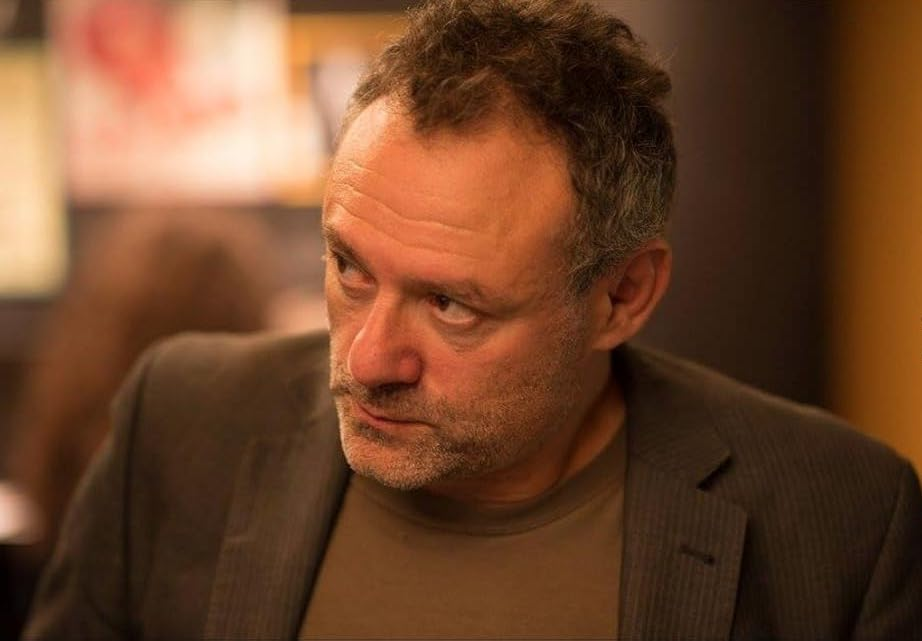
- Benjamin Ross
- Born: 1964 (age 61–62); United Kingdom
- Occupations: Film director, screenwriter
- Known for: The Young Poisoner’s Handbook, Poppy Shakespeare

Benjamin Ross is a British screenwriter and film director, born in 1964. He is best known for The Young Poisoner’s Handbook, Poppy Shakespeare, and The Frankenstein Chronicles. He is based in the United Kingdom.

== Biography ==
Ross graduated from Oxford University and later obtained a masters degree at the Columbia University Film School. In 1995, he wrote and directed The Young Poisoner’s Handbook, based on a real-life poisoning case. He went on to direct Poppy Shakespeare, and the HBO biopic RKO 281, starring Liev Schreiber and John Malkovich, about the making of Citizen Kane. The fim won the Golden Globe for Best TV Movie in 2000, along with two Emmys and 12 other nominations including Best Director.

Ross, alongside Barry Langford, created the 2015 period crime drama series The Frankenstein Chronicles. The programme was a re-imagining of Mary Shelley's 1818 novel Frankenstein; or, The Modern Prometheus, focusing on a British police inspector who uncovers a body stitched together from other corpses. Ross directed and co-wrote the first series. Chronicles, first airing on ITV Encore, opened to critical acclaim and drew an average 250,000 viewers per episode. On 20 June 2016, ITV announced that it had been renewed for a second series.

His most recent work is Testament: The Story of Moses, a biblical docudrama about the life of Moses. After being released on Netflix in March of 2024, it rose to the number 1 most watched TV show on Netflix.

== Filmography ==
Year	Title	Notes	Broadcaster/Distributor
1992	My Little Eye	Short film	
1995	The Young Poisoner’s Handbook	Writer and director	Polygram Filmed Entertainment
1999	RKO 281	Director	HBO
2006	Guilty Hearts	Director (segment: "Torte Bluma")	America Video Film
2008	Poppy Shakespeare	Director	Channel 4
2009	Trial & Retribution	Director, 2 episodes	ITV
2010	Thorne: Scaredycat	Director	Film1
2015-2017	The Frankenstein Chronicles	Creator, writer, director	ITV Encore
2024	Testament: The Story of Moses	Writer and director	Netflix
