= Gettysburg (2011 film) =

- Genre: Documentary; History; War
- Written by: Richard Bedser; Ed Fields
- Directed by: Adrian Moat
- Narrated by: Sam Rockwell
- Composer: Anthony Lledo
- Country of origin: United States
- Original language: English

Production
- Executive producers: Ridley Scott; Tony Scott; Mary Lisio; David McKillop; Mary E. Donahue; Julian P. Hobbs
- Producers: Christopher Cowen; Richard Bedser; Carter Figueroa; Vlokkie Gordon; David Wicht
- Cinematography: Michael Snyman
- Editor: Douglas Moxon
- Running time: 85 minutes
- Production companies: Film Afrika Worldwide; Herzog & Company; Scott Free Productions

Original release
- Network: History Channel
- Release: May 30, 2011

Gettysburg is a 2011 American Civil War television documentary film directed by Adrian Moat that was first aired on May 30, 2011 (Memorial Day) on the History Channel. This two-hour documentary film, narrated by actor Sam Rockwell, commenced a week of programming by the History channel honoring and commemorating the 150th Anniversary of the American Civil War. Gettysburg showcases the horror of the pivotal 1863 Battle of Gettysburg by following the stories of eight men as they put their lives on the line to fight for what they believed in.

== Characters ==
- Lieutenant Colonel Rufus Dawes voiced by André Sogliuzzo
- Sergeant Amos Humiston voiced by Tyrel Meyer
- Colonel James Wallace voiced by actor Joshua Artis
- Brigadier General William Barksdale
- Brigadier General Joseph R. Davis
- Assistant Surgeon LeGrand Wilson
- Private Joseph C. Lloyd voiced by actor Johnny Ray Meeks
- Private D. Ridgely Howard

== Civil War Week ==
On February 9, 2011, President and General Manager of History channel, Nancy Dubuc, announced the channel's partnership with the Civil War Trust and the National Park Foundation for GIVE 150, a massive educational and fund-raising initiative to enhance Civil War education nationwide, and to protect and preserve battlefields and other key sites from this pivotal period in American history. Dedicated to highlighting the 150th anniversary of the American Civil War an entire week of programming will be set aside featuring various new and old episodes of shows showcasing the war. In 2011 Civil War Week will commence on Memorial Day Monday with war themed episodes of Pawn Stars followed by the television premiere of Gettysburg. Throughout the week there will be new episodes of American Pickers, reruns of Brad Meltzer's Decoded, Modern Marvels and other various shows, along with the premiere of Lee & Grant a television documentary film directed by John Ealer.

== Production ==
The production was filmed in Western Cape, South Africa.

== Marketing campaign ==
Companies which signed on to sponsor the title and the Civil War Week project include Geico, Ram, and Bank of America.

Wanting to entice young and middle aged men to watch the Memorial Day special, senior director of consumer marketing at History Ann Marie Granite, went back to Microsoft's Xbox 360 to help promote the film. Features allow users to compete for prizes by downloading free market content from the Xbox Live store, other features include an interactive map of Gettysburg that provides historical background on each day of battle and campaigning videos that showcase the movie.

== See also ==
- Battle of Gettysburg
- List of films and television shows about the American Civil War
