= RKO 281 =

1999 film by Benjamin Ross about the making of Citizen Kane (1941)

- Australian poster
- Genre: Historical drama
- Based on: The Battle Over Citizen Kane by: Richard Ben Cramer; Thomas Lennon
- Written by: John Logan
- Directed by: Benjamin Ross
- Starring: Liev Schreiber; James Cromwell; Melanie Griffith; John Malkovich; Brenda Blethyn; Roy Scheider; Liam Cunningham; Kerry Shale
- Music by: John Altman
- Country of origin: United States
- Original language: English

Production
- Executive producers: Ridley Scott; Tony Scott
- Producer: Su Armstrong
- Cinematography: Mike Southon
- Editor: Alex Mackie
- Running time: 86 minutes
- Production companies: HBO Pictures; BBC Films; Scott Free Productions; WGBH Boston
- Budget: $12 million

Original release
- Network: HBO
- Release: November 20, 1999

RKO 281 is a 1999 American historical drama television film directed by Benjamin Ross, written by John Logan, and starring Liev Schreiber, James Cromwell, Melanie Griffith, John Malkovich, Roy Scheider, and Liam Cunningham. The film depicts the troubled production behind the 1941 film Citizen Kane. The film's title is a reference to the original production number of Citizen Kane. It premiered on HBO on November 20, 1999.

== Plot ==
In 1940, Orson Welles, RKO studio head George J. Schaefer, and screenwriter Herman J. Mankiewicz struggle in making what will be considered the greatest American film, Citizen Kane. Welles and Mankiewicz attend a party at Hearst Castle where meeting the hypocritical and tyrannical William Randolph Hearst gives Welles the inspiration to make a film about Hearst's life. Mankiewicz is against it because he knows Hearst's wrath will be horrible, but Welles says this is the film. Mankiewicz finally agrees.

At first, Welles tries to take credit for everything, including the script, and Mankiewicz is furious with Welles—he faces him, and Welles says he has every right and cuts ties with Mankiewicz. Orson later reconsiders and asks Mankiewicz to continue re-drafting the screenplay, giving him a joint credit. After learning from the gossip columnist Hedda Hopper, who had viewed a press screening, that Welles' film is actually a thinly veiled and exceptionally unflattering biography of him, publishing tycoon Hearst uses his immense power and influence to try to prevent the release of the picture. Hearst's mistress, actress Marion Davies, endures the embarrassment of having their private lives exposed and vilified. Hopper threatens to do the same to the studio executives of Hollywood if they release the film. Marion gives Hearst money when his finances begin to diminish (by selling all the jewelry he gave her and giving him the money in the form of a check).

In the end, after considerable delays and harassment, plus the disintegration of the professional relationship between Welles and Mankiewicz and a costly blow to Schaefer's career, the film is finally released. Its publicity is muted by Hearst's ban on its mention in all his publications and its commercial success is limited. Welles ultimately has the satisfaction of having created one of the most critically acclaimed films of all time.

== Cast ==
- Liev Schreiber as Orson Welles
- John Malkovich as Herman J. Mankiewicz
- Roy Scheider as George J. Schaefer
- James Cromwell as William Randolph Hearst
- Melanie Griffith as Marion Davies
- Liam Cunningham as Gregg Toland
- David Suchet as Louis B. Mayer
- Brenda Blethyn as Louella Parsons
- Fiona Shaw as Hedda Hopper
- Anastasia Hille as Carole Lombard
- Roger Allam as Walt Disney
- Simeon Andrews as John Houseman
- Jay Benedict as Daryl Zanuck
- Ron Berglas as David O. Selznick
- Sarah Franzl as Dorothy Comingore
- Joseph Long as Harry Cohn
- Oliver Pierre as Sam Goldwyn
- Adrian Schiller as Paul Stewart
- Kerry Shale as Bernard Herrmann
- Tim Woodward as Jack Warner
- Angus Wright as Joseph Cotten
- Bobby Valentino as Clark Gable
- Lucy Cohu as Dolores del Río

== Production ==
The script is based in part on the 1996 American documentary film The Battle Over Citizen Kane written by Thomas Lennon and Richard Ben Cramer.

Producer Ridley Scott wanted to film in the Hearst Castle, but was refused access. RKO 281 was filmed in the United Kingdom, mostly around London. The Gothic stairwell in Hearst Castle was filmed in the St Pancras Renaissance London Hotel. Hearst's private quarters and office, including a marble fireplace, were filmed in the high-ceilinged Gamble Room in the Victoria & Albert Museum. The fireplace mantelpiece seen in the room was saved from Dorchester House prior to that building's demolition in 1929. The Hearst castle dining hall and ballroom was filmed in the Great Hall of the London Guildhall.

== Reception ==
On aggregate review site Rotten Tomatoes, the film holds a "fresh" rating of 92%, based on 13 reviews.

== Awards and nominations ==
Year	Award	Category	Nominee(s)	Result	Ref.
2000	American Cinema Editors Awards	Best Edited Motion Picture for Non-Commercial Television	Alex Mackie	Nominated	
2000	Artios Awards	Best Casting for TV Movie of the Week	Lora Kennedy	Won	
2000	Columbus International Film & Video Festival	Chris Award (Entertainment)		Won	
2000	Golden Globe Awards	Best Miniseries or Motion Picture Made for Television		Won	
2000	Golden Globe Awards	Best Actor in a Miniseries or Television Film	Liev Schreiber	Nominated	
2000	Golden Globe Awards	Best Actress in a Supporting Role in a Series, Miniseries or Television Film	Melanie Griffith	Nominated	
2000	Online Film & Television Association	Best Motion Picture Made for Television		Won	
2000	Online Film & Television Association	Best Actor in a Motion Picture or Miniseries	Liev Schreiber	Won	
2000	Online Film & Television Association	Best Supporting Actor in a Motion Picture or Miniseries	James Cromwell	Nominated	
2000	Online Film & Television Association	Best Supporting Actor in a Motion Picture or Miniseries	John Malkovich	Nominated	
2000	Online Film & Television Association	Best Supporting Actress in a Motion Picture or Miniseries	Brenda Blethyn	Nominated	
2000	Online Film & Television Association	Best Supporting Actress in a Motion Picture or Miniseries	Melanie Griffith	Nominated	
2000	Online Film & Television Association	Best Direction of a Motion Picture or Miniseries		Won	
2000	Online Film & Television Association	Best Writing of a Motion Picture or Miniseries		Won	
2000	Online Film & Television Association	Best Costume Design in a Motion Picture or Miniseries		Nominated	
2000	Online Film & Television Association	Best Editing in a Motion Picture or Miniseries		Won	
2000	Online Film & Television Association	Best Lighting in a Motion Picture or Miniseries		Won	
2000	Online Film & Television Association	Best Makeup/Hairstyling in a Motion Picture or Miniseries		Nominated	
2000	Online Film & Television Association	Best Music in a Motion Picture or Miniseries		Nominated	
2000	Online Film & Television Association	Best New Theme Song in a Motion Picture or Miniseries		Nominated	
2000	Online Film & Television Association	Best New Titles Sequence in a Motion Picture or Miniseries		Nominated	
2000	Online Film & Television Association	Best Production Design in a Motion Picture or Miniseries		Nominated	
2000	Online Film & Television Association	Best Sound in a Motion Picture or Miniseries		Nominated	
2000	Online Film & Television Association	Best Ensemble in a Motion Picture or Miniseries		Won	
2000	Primetime Emmy Awards	Outstanding Made for Television Movie	Ridley Scott, Tony Scott, Diane Minter Lewis, Chris Zarpas, and Su Armstrong	Nominated	
2000	Primetime Emmy Awards	Outstanding Lead Actor in a Miniseries or a Movie	Liev Schreiber	Nominated	
2000	Primetime Emmy Awards	Outstanding Supporting Actor in a Miniseries or a Movie	James Cromwell	Nominated	
2000	Primetime Emmy Awards	Outstanding Supporting Actor in a Miniseries or a Movie	John Malkovich	Nominated	
2000	Primetime Emmy Awards	Outstanding Supporting Actress in a Miniseries or a Movie	Melanie Griffith	Nominated	
2000	Primetime Emmy Awards	Outstanding Directing for a Miniseries, Movie or a Special	Benjamin Ross	Nominated	
2000	Primetime Emmy Awards	Outstanding Writing for a Miniseries, Movie or a Special	John Logan	Nominated	
2000	Primetime Emmy Awards	Outstanding Art Direction for a Miniseries, Movie or a Special	Maria Djurkovic, Lucinda Thomson, and Tatiana Macdonald	Nominated	
2000	Primetime Emmy Awards	Outstanding Casting for a Miniseries, Movie or a Special	Lora Kennedy and Joyce Nettles	Won	
2000	Primetime Emmy Awards	Outstanding Hairstyling for a Miniseries, Movie or a Special	Roseann Samuel, Elaine Browne, Karen Z.M. Turner, Aileen Seaton, and Lesley Noble	Nominated	
2000	Primetime Emmy Awards	Outstanding Music Composition for a Miniseries, Movie or a Special	John Altman	Won	
2000	Primetime Emmy Awards	Outstanding Single-Camera Picture Editing for a Miniseries, Movie or a Special	Alex Mackie	Nominated	
2000	Primetime Emmy Awards	Outstanding Sound Mixing for a Miniseries or a Movie	Clive Derbyshire, Mark Taylor, and Mike Dowson	Won	
2000	San Francisco International Film Festival	Best Television – Drama-Television Feature	Benjamin Ross and Su Armstrong	Won	
2000	Satellite Awards	Best Television Film		Nominated	
2001	Nastro d'Argento	Best Foreign Director	Benjamin Ross	Nominated	
2001	Writers Guild of America Awards	Long Form – Adapted	John Logan; Based in part on the documentary The Battle Over Citizen Kane (from American Experience)	Won (Note: Tied with Thomas Rickman for Tuesdays with Morrie.)	

== See also ==
- Mank (2020)
