= The Grey (soundtrack) =

2012 film soundtrack album

The Grey (Original Motion Picture Soundtrack)

Film score by Marc Streitenfeld
- Released: January 24, 2012
- Recorded: 2011
- Studios: Abbey Road Studios, London
- Genre: Film score
- Length: 35:09
- Label: Lakeshore
- Producer: Marc Streitenfeld

Marc Streitenfeld chronology
Welcome to the Rileys (2010)	The Grey (2012)	Prometheus (2012)

The Grey (Original Motion Picture Soundtrack) is the film score to the 2011 film The Grey directed by Joe Carnahan starring Liam Neeson. The score is composed by Marc Streitenfeld and released through Lakeshore Records digitally on January 24, 2012, followed by a physical release on February 14, 2012.

== Background ==
Marc Streitenfeld composed the score for The Grey. He accepted the project before working on the Ridley Scott-directorial Prometheus (2012) and since that film took a longer production time, especially for scoring itself. Streitenfeld also prioritized working on The Grey which eventually took a few months to compose the music. Despite of the extensive use of natural and environmental sounds in the sound design as well as prioritizing silence. Streitenfeld composed over 100 minutes of music for the film, while the accompanying soundtrack album. only consisted of 35 minutes of music. The score was recorded at the Abbey Road Studios in London. In addition, the song "The City Surf" composed by Jamin Winans as a part of the score for Ink (2009) was featured in the film. Jamin and his wife Kiona stated that they were excited on the song's inclusion in the film, as with Carnahan had secured the licensing rights of that song, and had really liked the film as well as the song being used appropriately.

== Release ==
Lakeshore Records released the album digitally on January 24, 2012, and in physical formats on February 14, 2012.

== Reception ==
James Southall of Movie Wave wrote "it doesn’t make for a particularly engrossing album and, while it’s possibly the most impressive music Streitenfeld has written so far, that is I’m afraid a case of damning with faint praise. I don’t want to be overly harsh – if the music works well enough in the film then one can’t argue too much with what the composer’s done – its suitability for album release is more what I’m questioning." Filmtracks wrote "Even in these more palatable cues, however, The Grey remains a cold and depressing score. It presents very little of redemptive value when heard on its 35-minute album. Once again, if the music had disappeared after "You Are Gonna Die" and the trek of the survivors had been left silent until "Last Walk," the re-emergence of the music would have been infinitely more powerful, essentially signaling the appropriate call of death to open and close the picture. Unless you fell in love with the picture, approach the short, depressing album with caution."

Colin McCracken of Louder than War wrote "An absolutely beautiful and intelligently structured soundtrack album which continually provides something new upon every visitation." James Christopher Monger of AllMusic wrote "Elegant and primal, Streitenfeld's wonderfully atmospheric score never overshadows the images on the screen, but lurks in the background like a true predator." "This visual magnetism is matched by a elegant, spare score from Marc Streitenfeld (Robin Hood), the man behind the music for Ridley Scott‘s upcoming Prometheus [...] Complimenting Streitenfeld’s subtle score is a jarring and ear-piercing sound design". Scott Weinberg of ScreenAnarchy of "The score by Marc Streitenfeld, another relative newbie—though he's scoring Prometheus for Ridley Scott—is action-style intense one moment, and sadly tragic the next".

== Track listing ==
No.	Title	Length
1.	"Writing the Letter"	2:00
2.	"Suicide"	1:44
3.	"You Are Gonna Die"	3:14
4.	"Walking"	1:45
5.	"Eyes Glowing"	1:25
6.	"The Morning After"	2:57
7.	"Collecting Wallets"	1:53
8.	"Wife Memory"	1:08
9.	"Life and Death"	2:52
10.	"Lagging Behind"	1:53
11.	"Running from Wolves"	1:46
12.	"Daughter Appears"	2:13
13.	"Last Walk"	2:33
14.	"Memorial"	3:41
15.	"Alpha"	2:16
16.	"Into the Fray"	1:49
Total length:		35:09

== Personnel ==
Credits adapted from liner notes:

- Music composer and producer – Marc Streitenfeld
- Bass saxophone – Dave White, Phil Todd
- Cello – Caroline Dale
- Violin – Tom Bowes
- Orchestrator and conductor – Ben Foster
- Orchestra leader – Thomas Bowes
- Orchestra contractor – Isobel Griffiths
- Assistant orchestra contractor – Jo Buckley
- Engineer – Paul Thomason, Pete Hutchings
- Programming – Sunna Wehrmeijer
- Recording and mixing – Peter Cobbin
- Mastering – Dave Collins
- Music editor – Joe Bonn, Kirsty Whalley
- Music supervisor – Andy Ross, Laura Katz
- Protools recordist – John Barrett
- Executive producer – Brian McNelis, Skip Williamson
- Management – Cutting Edge
- Musical assistance – Alex Lu
- Copyist – Dave Foster
- A&R – Eric Craig
- Art direction – John Bergin

== Accolades ==
Award	Date of ceremony	Category	Recipient(s)	Result	Ref.
International Film Music Critics Association	February 21, 2013	Best Original Score for an Action/Adventure/Thriller Film	Marc Streitenfeld	Nominated	
