= Robin Hood (2010 soundtrack) =

Robin Hood (Original Motion Picture Soundtrack)

Film score by Marc Streitenfeld
- Released: 11 May 2010
- Recorded: Abbey Road Studios, London
- Genre: Film score
- Length: 51:39
- Label: Varèse Sarabande
- Producer: Marc Streitenfeld

Marc Streitenfeld chronology
Body of Lies (2008)	Robin Hood (2010)	Welcome to the Rileys (2010)

Robin Hood (Original Motion Picture Soundtrack) is the film score to the 2010 film Robin Hood. The film's music, written and performed by Marc Streitenfeld, was released on 11 May 2010.

== Background ==
Marc Streitenfeld, who previously composed for Scott's A Good Year (2006), American Gangster (2007) and Body of Lies (2008), wrote music for Robin Hood. He visited the sets at London to observe the filming process so that he could develop musical ideas on his mind and wrote the themes based on the initial ideas. Since the film had few on-screen musical scenes that needed attention, Streitenfeld began writing the themes during production itself. He considered the score as orchestral, based on the "stunning and very inspiring" visuals.

== Release ==
Varèse Sarabande released the film score on 11 May 2010.

== Reception ==
Filmtracks wrote: "Streitenfeld has given us a Robin Hood that slaps you across the face over and over again with the same rhythmic and thematic fragments in every cue. That might have worked if there had been something interesting in the composition to begin with." Zanobard Reviews gave 6/10 to the score and wrote: "Marc Streitenfeld’s Robin Hood is a surprisingly good score with some inspiring and very heroic music for the titular character." Kirk Honeycutt of The Hollywood Reporter wrote: "Marc Streitenfeld’s brilliant score make this one of the fastest 140-minute movies you’ll ever see." Mary and Frederic Ann Brussat of Spirituality & Practice wrote: "The music by Marc Streitenfeld offers a mesmerizing accompaniment to the many different moods in the story." A reviewer from Royal Road wrote: "The score composed by Marc Streitenfeld fits the Robin Hood movie so well." A. O. Scott of The New York Times found the music "loud", while Mike Goodridge of Screen International considered the score as "predictably fine" among other technical works. Ed Gonzalez of Slant Magazine called the score "preposterous".

== Track listing ==
No.	Title	Length
1.	"Destiny"	3:36
2.	"Creatures"	2:09
3.	"Fate Has Smiled Upon Us"	2:02
4.	"Godfrey"	3:32
5.	"Ambush"	1:16
6.	"Pact Sworn in Blood"	2:52
7.	"Returning the Crown"	1:13
8.	"Planting the Fields"	1:18
9.	"Sherwood Forest"	2:19
10.	"John Is King"	4:02
11.	"Robin Speaks"	2:33
12.	"Killing Walter"	2:02
13.	"Nottingham Burns"	2:12
14.	"Siege"	2:11
15.	"Landing of the French"	2:49
16.	"Walter's Burial"	3:05
17.	"Preparing for Battle"	2:41
18.	"Charge"	1:20
19.	"Clash"	2:41
20.	"The Final Arrow"	2:30
21.	"The Legend Begins"	1:28
22.	"Merry Men"	1:48
Total length:		51:39

== Personnel ==
Credits adapted from liner notes:

- Music composer, producer and arranger – Marc Streitenfeld
- Programming – Sunna Wehrmeijer
- Assistant engineer – Gordon Davidson, Stanley Gabriel
- Pre-record layback – Alex Lu
- Recording – Peter Cobbin, Andrew Dudman
- Score recordist – Sam Okell
- Digital recordist – Kirsty Whalley
- Mixing – Peter Cobbin
- Mixing assistance – Craig Mann, Gregg Hayes
- Mastering – Christian Wright
- Music editor – Del Spiva, Joe Bonn
- Playback operator – Peter Clarke
- Music production assistance – Sven Faulconer
- Executive producer – Brian Grazer, Ridley Scott, Robert Townson
- Music preparation – Dave Foster, Phil Knight

Orchestra and choir

- Orchestrator – Benjamin Wallfisch
- Assistant orchestrator – Lucy Whalley
- Conductor – Ben Foster
- Contractor – Isobel Griffiths
- Choir – Metro Voices, Bach Choir
- Chorus master – David Hill, Jenny O'Grady

Soloists

- Cello – Caroline Dale
- Ethnic percussion – Paul Clarvis
- Fiddle – Giles Lewin
- Flute – Eliza Marshall, William Lyons
- Hurdy Gurdy – Nigel Eaton
- Lute – Jacob Heringman, James Akers
- Percussions – Frank Ricotti, Gary Kettel, Glyn Matthews
- Solo vocals – Kathleen MacInnes
- Timpani – Tristan Fry
- Uilleann pipes – Robert White, Troy Donockley
- Violin – Thomas Bowes
- Whistle – William Lyons

Management

- Music business affairs for Universal Pictures – Phil Cohen
- Director of scoring for Universal Pictures – Tiffany Jones
- Executive in charge of music for Universal Pictures – Mike Knobloch
- Music supervision for Universal Pictures – Harry Garfield

== Accolades ==
Award	Category	Recipient(s) and nominee(s)	Result	Ref.
ASCAP Film and Television Music Awards	Top Box Office Films	Marc Streitenfeld	Won	
International Film Music Critics Association	Best Original Score for an Action/Adventure/Thriller Film	Marc Streitenfeld	Nominated	
