= Body of Lies =

Body of Lies can refer to:

- Body of Lies (novel), a 2007 spy thriller by David Ignatius, about a CIA operative.
- Body of Lies (film), a 2008 film by director Ridley Scott, based on the 2007 novel.
  - Body of Lies (soundtrack), soundtrack to the 2008 film.
- Body of Lies, a 2002 novel by Iris Johansen.
