= The Frame (film) =

- Film Poster
- Directed by: Jamin Winans
- Written by: Jamin Winans
- Produced by: Kiowa Winans
- Starring: David Carranza Tiffany Mualem Cal Bartlett Christopher Soren Kelly Anthony Nuccio
- Cinematography: Robert Muratore
- Edited by: Jamin Winans
- Music by: Jamin Winans
- Production company: Double Edge Films
- Distributed by: Double Edge Films
- Release date: October 17, 2014
- Running time: 127 minutes
- Country: United States
- Language: English

The Frame is a 2014 American science fiction film, written and directed by Jamin Winans and starring David Carranza and Tiffany Mualem. It was produced by Winans's own independent production company, Double Edge Films, with Kiowa K. Winans, and shot by cinematographer Robert Muratore in locations around Denver, Colorado. It is the follow-up to the 2009 science fiction fantasy film Ink, also written and directed by Jamin Winans. The Frame played at the 2015 Sitges Film Festival in Spain, the 2015 Imagine Film Festival in Amsterdam and the 2015 Fantaspoa Film Festival in Brazil.

== Cast ==
- David Carranza as Alex
- Tiffany Mualem as Sam
- Christopher Soren Kelly as Dr. Schwartzman, Amenebar, and the Mechanic
- Cal Bartlett as Noah
- Anthony Nuccio as Bama
- Jordan Doll as James
- Kent Randell as Emilio
- Shauna Earp as Gloria

== Inspirations and themes ==
Winans told an interviewer for Fast Cheap Movie Thoughts:

"Ultimately I wanted to make a movie about the feeling of being abandoned by God. I wanted to explore the questions of God's existence, God's nature (benevolent or malevolent) and how we struggle between control and submission. The writing process for me always starts with images. I'll get an image of a moment and begin asking questions. Those questions eventually lead me to knowing the character and what brought him/her to that moment. With The Frame there were two primary images I started with: a man physically fighting to get out of a cage, and the man picking up a violin. I work for months (if not years) on an extensive outline and then write the actual script fairly quickly."

In the same interview, Winans had this to say about the process of writing the score for the film:

"I usually start working on the music at the script phase. The music helps me write and the writing helps me compose. With The Frame I composed about 75% of it before we started shooting and I was able to use that on set for key moments. Then, in the edit, I bounced back and forth between cutting and tweaking the music."

== Reception ==
Film School Rejects gave the film a B+ rating, with Chief Film Critic Rob Hunter writing:

Like Christopher Nolan on a budget, writer/director Jamin Winans (Ink) creates worlds where imagination and emotion trump logic and traditional cohesion. That’s not a criticism of either man’s talents — instead it’s just to say that both place a high premium on the way their films make us feel and the ideas we’re left to mull over in our minds once the credits have rolled. Winans’ latest film, The Frame, continues that theme as it presents viewers with a beautiful, sci-fi tinged love story fueled by fate, forgiveness and wonder.

Jason Heller, writing for Westword in an extensive interview and review writes:

The Frame turns out to be a marvel. It's not anything like Ink, but the vibe is the same: Normal people full of everyday dreams, faults and fears suddenly have their foundation of reality yanked out from under them. How they cope with that crisis is not only intellectually challenging, it's emotionally devastating.
