= By the Time I Get to Arizona =

1991 song by Public Enemy

- US promo release

Song by Public Enemy

from the album Apocalypse 91... The Enemy Strikes Black
- A-side: "Shut 'Em Down"
- Released: January 1992
- Studio: The Music Palace, Strong Island
- Genre: Political hip hop
- Length: 4:48
- Label: Def Jam
- Songwriters: Carlton Ridenhour; Stuart Robertz; Gary "G-Wiz" Rinaldo; Cerwin "C-Dawg" Depper; Mandrill; Neftali Santiago
- Producers: The Bomb Squad; Stuart Robertz; Cerwin "C-Dawg" Depper; Gary G-Wiz; The JBL

"By the Time I Get to Arizona" is a song by American hip hop group Public Enemy from their 1991 album Apocalypse 91... The Enemy Strikes Black. The song was written by frontman Chuck D in protest of the state of Arizona, where governor Evan Mecham had canceled Martin Luther King Jr. Day and the people voted against its reintroduction.

It was released as a B-side to the single "Shut 'Em Down" in January 1992, but had its own music video. The video was controversial for its depiction of black paramilitaries assassinating Arizona politicians in revenge for King, who was non-violent. Some black activists and King's widow Coretta Scott King condemned the themes of the video. Chuck D and Public Enemy's spokesman Harry Allen defended the video as a fictional revenge for King's assassination.

== Background and composition ==
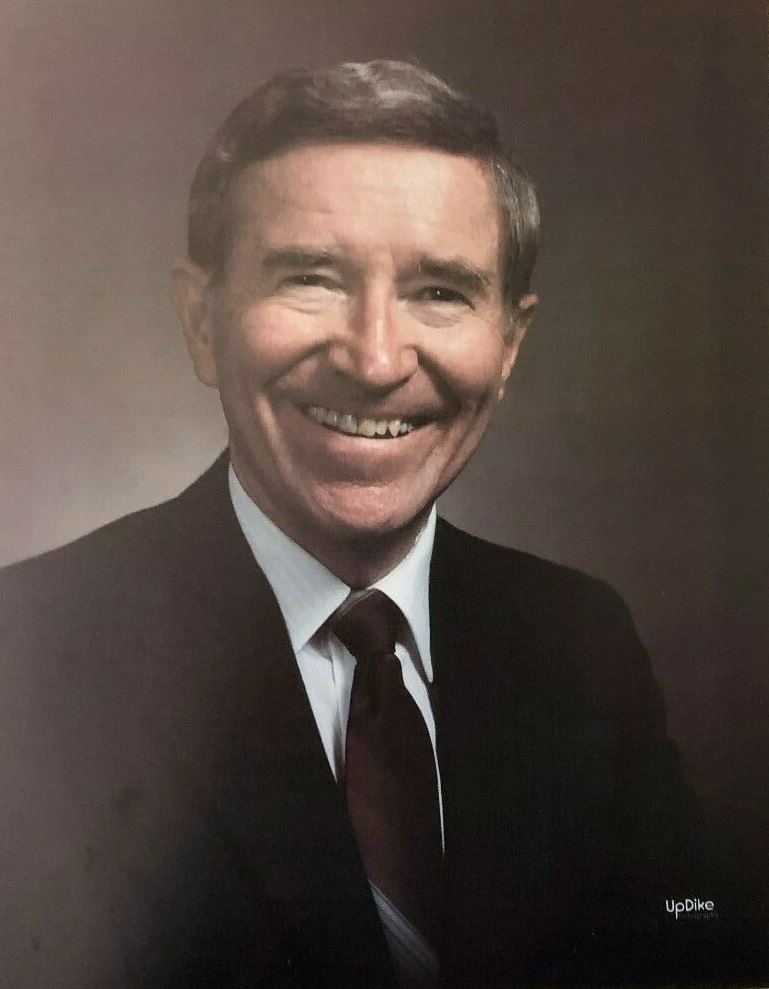
The song was written in protest against Arizona governor Evan Mecham's refusal to observe Martin Luther King Jr. Day.

Public Enemy frontman Chuck D wrote the song in protest at the state of Arizona, where Governor Evan Mecham had canceled Martin Luther King Jr. Day and the people of the state voted against a proposition to reintroduce it. Backlash to this decision included the NFL moving Super Bowl XXVII to California, losing around $100 million in revenue for Arizona.

Chuck D preferred to come up with titles before writing songs, and devised "By the Time I Get to Arizona" due to his appreciation for Isaac Hayes's cover of "By the Time I Get to Phoenix". Gary G-Wiz produced the track, with the main riff sampled from funk band Mandrill's "Two Sisters of Mystery" (1973), and a 45-second bridge from the Jackson 5's "Walk On" (1971). According to Evan Serpick of Spin magazine, the organs in the latter sample "evoke civil rights protesters calling from the grave". The rap was originally recorded over the beat that was used for "Shut 'Em Down".

In the lyrics of the song, Chuck D says "neither party is mine, not the jackass or the elephant", indicating that he and the black community will not challenge Arizona by voting for the Democratic or Republican parties represented by those mascots.

During live performances of the song, the group would hang a Klansman effigy. They performed the song as their only song when opening for U2 at Sun Devil Stadium in Tempe, Arizona, in 1992. Their early exit from the stage was supported by U2 singer Bono.

== Video ==
Though not released as a single, "By the Time I Get to Arizona" had a music video. It opens with a white Arizona politician telling the press that Martin Luther King Day will never be observed in the state. Guest artist Sister Souljah then declares that paramilitary forces are being sent to Arizona so that it will be observed. Footage of the paramilitary committing assassinations is interspersed with black-and-white recreations of King and the Civil Rights Movement receiving violent abuse. The video was directed by Eric Meza, who had previous credits with N.W.A.

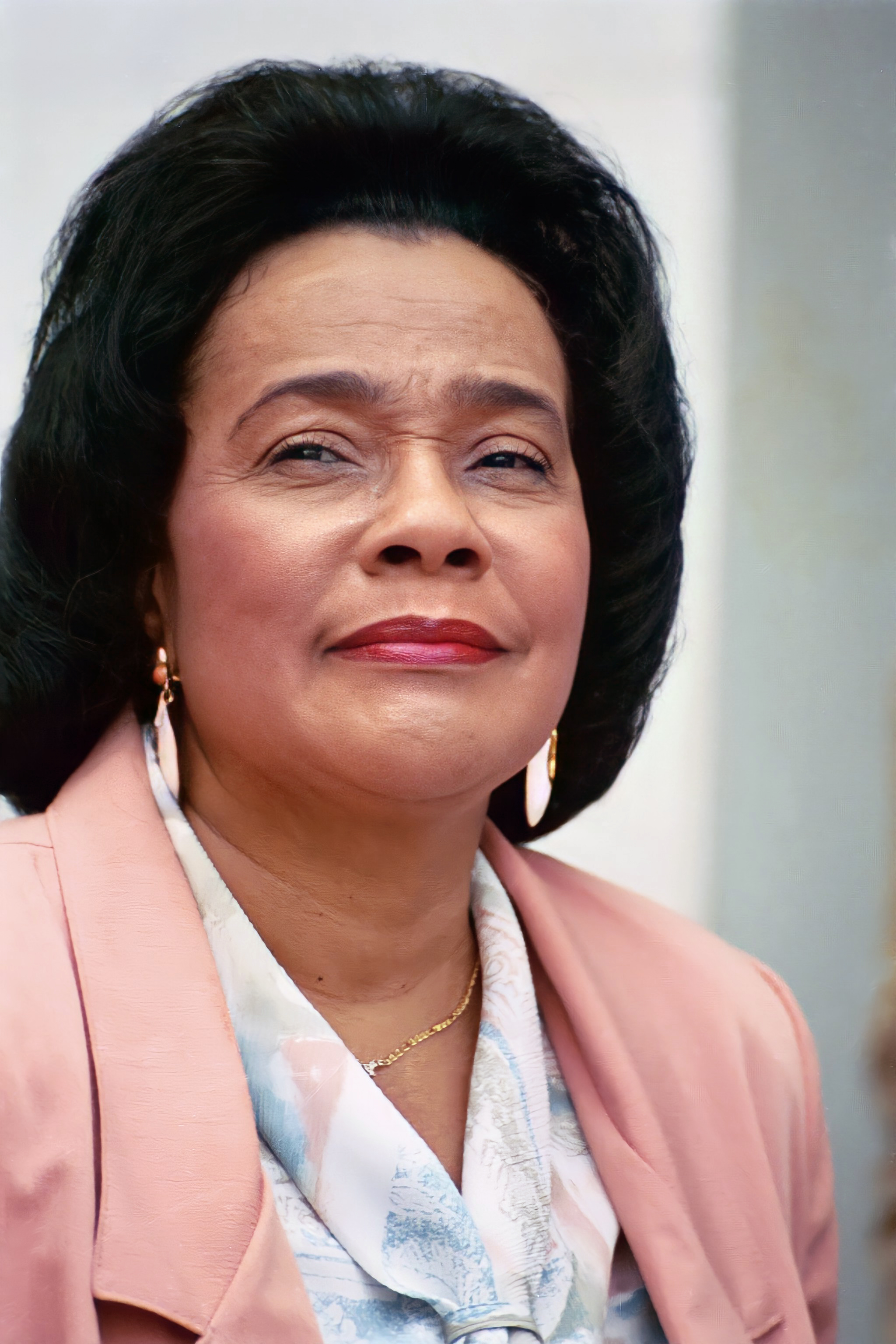
Coretta Scott King condemned the video's depiction of violence in memory of her assassinated husband.

The video was criticized by some scholars of King, and older black activists, for its violent scenes. His widow Coretta Scott King condemned it. The video was removed from MTV's regular rotation.

According to Rybacki and Rybacki, the synthesis in the video between the violence towards King and the Civil Rights Movement, and the fictional retaliatory violence by black Americans against Arizona politicians, creates a verbally violent "thromise" – separate from both King's peaceful activism and violent resistance. Chuck D said on the day of its MTV premiere that the video is a fantasy to show white viewers the importance of a public holiday honoring a black leader; he also said that in the modern era King would be a more radical "Martin Luther King Farrakhan". Public Enemy spokesman Harry Allen concurred that King would have radicalised if he survived being shot: "we wonder what he would have stood for, if he had been able to stand after that bullet ripped violently through his neck. Being assassinated, it's been said, will often change your political viewpoint". Chuck D reiterated in 2011 that he did not see a problem with a violent video to honor a non-violent activist: "I'm for peace, but I can make a visual statement about how I feel about what happened. The actuality is that I shot a video in rebuttal to something that happened in real life".

== Reception and legacy ==
A 2020 list in the Phoenix New Times named it among the 27 best songs about Metro Phoenix, calling it "harshest critique of Arizona, and with good measure". In February 2014, around the time of controversial LGBT-related Arizona SB 1062, Christopher Federico of The Washington Post chose the song for "The week in one song".

Chuck D and academic Gaye Theresa Johnson co-authored a 2010 article for The Huffington Post in which they said that the anti-black racism decried in the song still existed in Arizona politics but directed toward Hispanic immigrants through Arizona SB 1070. In 2011, amidst the backdrop of the same immigration legislation, Chuck D collaborated with painter Ravi Dosaj for an artwork based on the song. The song's title was used for a 2012 paper on young Mexican Americans in Arizona and their experiences with racism.

The song was on the soundtrack for the 2002 video game Tony Hawk's Pro Skater 4.
