= The Grey =

2011 film by Joe Carnahan

- Theatrical release poster
- Directed by: Joe Carnahan
- Screenplay by: Joe Carnahan; Ian MacKenzie Jeffers
- Based on: "Ghost Walker" by Ian MacKenzie Jeffers
- Produced by: Jules Daly; Joe Carnahan; Ridley Scott; Mickey Liddell
- Starring: Liam Neeson; Frank Grillo; Dermot Mulroney; Dallas Roberts; Joe Anderson; Nonso Anozie; James Badge Dale
- Cinematography: Masanobu Takayanagi
- Edited by: Roger Barton; Jason Hellmann
- Music by: Marc Streitenfeld
- Production companies: LD Entertainment; Scott Free Productions; 1984 Private Defense Contractors
- Distributed by: Open Road Films (United States); Entertainment Film Distributors (United Kingdom); Inferno Distribution (International)
- Release dates: December 11, 2011 (Butt-Numb-A-Thon); January 27, 2012 (United States)
- Running time: 117 minutes
- Countries: United States; United Kingdom
- Language: English
- Budget: $25 million
- Box office: $81.2 million

The Grey is a 2011 psychological thriller survival film co-written, produced and directed by Joe Carnahan, and starring Liam Neeson, Frank Grillo, Dermot Mulroney, Dallas Roberts, Joe Anderson, Nonso Anozie, and James Badge Dale. It is based on the short story "Ghost Walker" by Ian MacKenzie Jeffers, who also co-wrote the screenplay with Carnahan. The story follows a number of oil-men stranded in Alaska after a plane crash who must survive a pack of Canadian grey wolves, stalking them during the mercilessly cold weather.

Released in the United States on January 27, 2012, the film received positive reviews, with praise for its philosophical themes, and for Liam Neeson's performance. It grossed $81 million worldwide.

== Plot ==
John Ottway works as a sharpshooter at a remote Alaska oil facility, protecting the staff from frequent grey wolf attacks. His wife has died from a terminal illness, leaving him devastated and depressed. On Ottway's last day of work, he considers suicide.

The next day, Ottway embarks on a return flight to Anchorage with his fellow workers. A malfunction causes the plane to crash in an icy wilderness. Ottway survives, and along with John Diaz, Jerome Talget, Pete Henrick, Todd Flannery, Jackson Burke, and Dwayne Hernandez, takes shelter in the plane wreckage. While keeping watch that night, Hernandez is attacked and killed by a wolf. After finding his body in the morning, Ottway states that they may be within the territory of a wolf pack. He believes the wolves feel threatened by the survivors' presence and thinks they may have a better chance of surviving in the nearby forest. Not expecting a rescue, the group decides to leave.

The survivors journey south with Ottway leading the way. Flannery falls behind the group and is killed by the wolves. At nightfall, the group is attacked again, and they light several campfires to ward off the predators. Diaz, overwhelmed with stress, threatens Ottway with a knife. Ottway disarms him before the situation escalates; however, a lone wolf charges at Diaz. The group manages to kill the animal and subsequently cooks and eats it. Ottway speculates that the wolf was an omega sent by the alpha wolf to test the group's abilities. Enraged, Diaz throws the severed head of the wolf at the pack.

While the group sits around the campfire that night, Diaz discusses his beliefs and declares that he's an atheist. Talget states he has faith in God and speaks lovingly of his daughter Mary who has long hair only he is allowed to cut. Ottway also expresses atheist beliefs and recites a poem his father wrote about fighting and survival. The next day, Burke dies from hypoxia during a sudden blizzard. The survivors attempt to cross a canyon with an anchor rope on a nearby tree to lower themselves off the edge. Talget falls and is badly injured, seeing a vision of Mary telling him she loves him before he is finished off by the wolf pack. In an attempt to save him, Diaz also falls and injures his knee.

Eventually, Diaz, Ottway, and Henrick arrive at a river, where Diaz, injured, dispirited, and exhausted, tells his companions he can go no further. After leaving him, Ottway and Henrick continue their trek and are again pursued by the wolf pack. Henrick falls into the river and becomes trapped underwater. Ottway, powerless to rescue him, watches as Henrick drowns. Ottway stumbles into a clearing, exhausted and suffering from hypothermia. He arranges the wallets of the dead passengers in the shape of a cross and recalls the poem written by his father. Alone in the clearing, Ottway realizes he has arrived in the wolves' den and that the entire time, the group's attempts to get away from pack's territory only led them deeper into it. As the pack's alpha emerges and approaches him, Ottway gathers his last reserves of strength (while recalling his deceased wife's last words to "[not] be afraid"), arms himself with a knife and shards of liquor bottles taped to his hand, and recites his father's poem one last time. The screen cuts to black as the alpha and Ottway charge at one another.

A post-credits scene shows Ottway and the alpha wolf lying together following their battle, their fates left unclear.

== Cast ==
- Liam Neeson as John Ottway
- Frank Grillo as John Diaz
- Dermot Mulroney as Jerome Talget
- Dallas Roberts as Pete Henrick
- Joe Anderson as Todd Flannery
- Nonso Anozie as Jackson Burke
- James Badge Dale as Luke Lewenden
- Ben Bray as Dwayne Hernandez
- Greg Nicotero as Duke Chavis
- Jacob Blair as Simon Cimoski
- Anne Openshaw as Ana Ottway

== Production ==
The Grey reunited director Joe Carnahan with producers Ridley Scott and Tony Scott (credited as executive producer) as well as actor Liam Neeson, who collaborated on the 2010 action film The A-Team. The film initially imagined a much-younger lead character and Bradley Cooper, who also worked with Carnahan on The A-Team, was cast in the lead role, but he was eventually replaced by Neeson.

Filming began in January 2011 and ended in March. The film was shot in forty days in Vancouver and Smithers, British Columbia, with several scenes shot at the Smithers Regional Airport. According to Empire magazine, in the climactic scene in which Neeson's character pens a letter to his wife, Carnahan urged Neeson to "channel his grief" over the death of his wife Natasha Richardson. Carnahan disclosed, in a Q&A session following an early screening at the Aero Theatre in Santa Monica, he had an alternative ending he never intended to use showing Neeson battling the alpha wolf. It was supposed to be included in deleted cuts; however, no extras were included on the Blu-ray.

== Release ==
The world premiere of The Grey took place on January 11, 2012, at the Regal Cinemas Theatre in Los Angeles. The film was released nationwide on January 27, 2012.

=== Marketing ===
Promotion for The Grey in part targeted Christian groups by issuing a "film companion", which highlighted the spiritual value of the film. Marketing also partnered with The Weather Network to highlight the hazardous filming conditions. Open Road Films incorporated comments tweeted by film critics to promote the film in the third trailer for The Grey. This was the first time tweets from and Twitter handles for professional critics had been used in a film trailer.

== Music ==
The score for The Grey was released on CD February 14, 2012. A digital version available for download was released on January 24, 2012. Film director and composer Jamin Winans composed the musical score for his film Ink (2009), and his song, The City Surf from Ink was used in The Grey, in conjunction with a score composed by Marc Streitenfeld.

== Reception ==
=== Critical response ===
On the review aggregator website Rotten Tomatoes, 80% of 207 critics' reviews are positive, with an average rating of 7.00/10. The website's consensus reads: "The Grey is an exciting tale of survival, populated with fleshed-out characters and a surprising philosophical agenda." Metacritic, which uses a weighted average, assigned the film a score of 64 out of 100, based on 35 critics, indicating "generally favorable" reviews. Audiences polled by CinemaScore gave the film an average grade of "B−" on an A+ to F scale.

Roger Ebert gave the film three and a half stars out of four, and wrote the unrelenting harshness of The Grey so affected him, he departed the screening of a different movie on the same day:

It was the first time I walked out of a film because of the previous film. The way I was feeling in my gut, it just wouldn't be fair to the next film... There's time for some conversation among the men, and this film, directed by Joe Carnahan and written by him and Ian Mackenzie Jeffers, treats them as individuals. They're not simply a group of victims. The Grey advances with pitiless logic. There are more wolves than men. The men have weapons, the wolves have patience, the weather is punishing. I sat regarding the screen with mounting dread. The movie had to have a happy ending, didn't it? If not "happy," then at least a relief in some sense? Sit through the entire credits. There's one more shot still to come. Not that you wouldn't be content without it.

The film also earned a place on A.O. Scott's list of the year's ten best films, and Slate film critic Dana Stevens included it in her runners-up for the year's best movies. Film critic Richard Roeper also had The Grey in his top 10 best movies of 2012 list, placing it at number 3.

Dissenters' reviews tend to focus on the film's abrupt ending, and perceive the emotional and philosophical undertones as unnecessary. Siobhan Synnot of The Scotsman gave the film two stars, commenting "On the down side, there's a lot of dull pretentious philosophizing about the heartlessness of nature and God. On the up side, you get to see a man punch a wolf in the face." Some reviewers and analysts say the film has an atheist theme, due to characters such as John Ottway (Liam Neeson) pleading for divine help but not getting any.

=== Box office ===
The Grey opened in North America on January 27, 2012 in 3,185 theaters and grossed $19.7 million in its opening weekend, with an average of $6,174 per theater, finishing first. The film ultimately earned $51.6 million domestically, and $29.7 million internationally, for a total of $81.2 million, against its $25 million production budget.

== Controversy ==
On January 19, 2012, British Columbia's The Province featured an article about the movie's crew buying four wolf carcasses, two for props for the film and two wolves for the cast to eat. This angered environmentalists and animal activists, irate because the film depicts wolves in a negative light, specifically at a time grey wolves are not on any Endangered Species Act in many western American states. In response to the portrayal of wolves in the film, groups including PETA and WildEarth Guardians started drives to boycott the film. Open Road responded by placing a fact sheet about the grey wolf on the film's official website while the Sierra Club cooperated. Carnahan responded to the criticism by saying the film is meant to reflect humanity's internal spiritual journeys.
