= Apocalypse 91... The Enemy Strikes Black =

Apocalypse 91… The Enemy Strikes Black

Studio album by Public Enemy
- Released: October 1, 1991
- Recorded: 1990–91
- Studios: The Music Palace in Long Island, New York
- Genres: Hardcore hip hop; political rap
- Length: 51:54
- Labels: Def Jam; Columbia
- Producers: Gary G-Wiz; The Bomb Squad (exec.); The Imperial Grand Ministers of Funk

Public Enemy chronology
Fear of a Black Planet (1990)	Apocalypse 91… The Enemy Strikes Black (1991)	Muse Sick-n-Hour Mess Age (1994)

Singles from Apocalypse 91… The Enemy Strikes Black
- 1. "Bring tha Noize" Released: June 4, 1991; 2. "Can't Truss It" Released: September 24, 1991; 3. "Shut 'Em Down" Released: January 3, 1992; 4. "Nighttrain" Released: March 3, 1992

Apocalypse 91… The Enemy Strikes Black is the fourth studio album by American hip hop group Public Enemy, released on October 1, 1991, by Def Jam Recordings and Columbia Records. The album received critical acclaim, ranking at No. 2 in The Village Voice's 1991 Pazz & Jop critics' poll.

== Recording and production ==
Apocalypse 91 was recorded at The Mix Palace in Long Island, New York and produced by The Bomb Squad and The Imperial Grand Ministers of Funk, which consisted of producers Stuart Robertz (fictional), Cerwin "C-Dawg" Depper (fictional), Gary "G-Wiz" Rinaldo, and The JBL. The album title is an allusion to the titles of the films Apocalypse Now and The Empire Strikes Back.

The group would take a new direction with their sound, partly out of necessity. According to Hank Shocklee, around this time, the disks for every track they had been working on for the past four to five years had been stolen. As a result, they had to rush to re-create their music and to put out their album in a timely manner. Shocklee admitted that it was impossible to completely recover what they had lost, saying "once you lose all your data, it's very difficult to get that data back...you may get some of it back, but you'll never get the complete set. You won't even know what the complete set is, because there's data in there you didn't really know you had." In retrospect, he believed the loss "stunted [Public Enemy's] growth. We never really recovered after that. We was on a roll—I was on a roll, and to lose that material set me back so hard." As a result, the sound was a little leaner than the dense production of their previous albums, and live musicians became a prominent element as well.

The group recorded "1 Million Bottlebags" to protest the pervasiveness of malt liquor in the African-American community. Public Enemy collaborated with the metal band Anthrax to record a thrash version of their earlier single "Bring the Noise".

== Release and promotion ==
The album was released on October 1, 1991, by Def Jam Recordings and Columbia Records. Apocalypse 91 produced four singles: "Can't Truss It", "Nighttrain", "Shut 'Em Down" and its B-side "By the Time I Get to Arizona". The latter featured a controversial music video where Public Enemy was depicted killing the 17th governor of Arizona, Evan Mecham, who refused to recognize Martin Luther King Jr.'s birthday as a national holiday. "Can't Truss It" was Public Enemy's most successful single, peaking at No. 9 on the Hot Soul Singles chart and at No. 50 on the Billboard Hot 100 chart. The song also peaked at No. 5 on the Dance chart, becoming their most successful release there.

== Critical reception ==
Professional ratings
Review scores
Source	Rating
AllMusic	5/5 stars
Chicago Tribune	3/4 stars
Entertainment Weekly	A+
The Guardian	5/5 stars
Los Angeles Times	3.5/4 stars
NME	7/10
Q	4/5 stars
Rolling Stone	4/5 stars
The Source	4/5
The Village Voice	A

Upon release, Apocalypse 91 earned critical acclaim. Anthony DeCurtis of Rolling Stone praised its production and lyrics, stating that Apocalypse 91 "attempts nothing short of setting a sociopolitical agenda for the black community." Similarly, Ronin Ro of The Source highlighted Chuck D's powerful and focused lyrics as well as the uncompromising and raw nature of the album. In Playboy, prominent critic Robert Christgau highlighted the first half of the album, calling it "Public Enemy's most exciting sustained sequence ever", while criticizing the second half for being less consistent, although altogether enduring in the same way as the Rolling Stones' Let It Bleed (1969). NME's Ian McCann credited Apocalypse 91 for its "totally brutal and funky" music, but was disappointed that it rarely deviates from its forceful approach, despite the "sharp intelligence" of its lyrics.

"Apocalypse '91 is great rather than classic because you can't make four classic albums in a row…" observed the hip-hop fanzine Louder Than A Bomb!. "PE are still the best band in America and they've once again made the best album of the year."

Apocalypse 91 was ranked at No. 2 in The Village Voice's 1991 Pazz & Jop critics' poll, behind Nirvana's Nevermind, while editors of Spin ranked it 7th in their list of 20 Best Albums of the Year. Retrospectively, AllMusic editor Stephen Thomas Erlewine cites the album as one of the great records of golden age hip hop. The record was also included in the book 1001 Albums You Must Hear Before You Die.

== Commercial performance ==
Apocalypse 91... The Enemy Strikes Black debuted at number four on the US Billboard 200 chart and at number one on the US Top R&B/Hip-Hop Albums chart. On November 26, 1991, the album was certified platinum by the Recording Industry Association of America (RIAA) for shipments of one million copies in the United States.

== Track listing ==
All tracks are written by Carlton Ridenhour, Stuart Robertz, Gary "G-Wiz" Rinaldo, and Cerwin "C-Dawg" Depper unless otherwise noted.

Side 1
No.	Title	Writer(s)	Length
1.	"Lost at Birth"		3:49
2.	"Rebirth"	Ridenhour; Robertz; Rinaldo; The JBL; Depper	0:59
3.	"Nighttrain"		3:27
4.	"Can't Truss It"		5:21

Side 2
No.	Title	Writer(s)	Length
1.	"I Don't Wanna Be Called Yo Niga"	William Drayton Jr.; Rinaldo; Robertz	4:23
2.	"How to Kill a Radio Consultant"		3:09
3.	"By the Time I Get to Arizona"	Ridenhour; Robertz; Rinaldo; Depper; Mandrill; Neftali Santiago	4:48

Side 3
No.	Title	Writer(s)	Length
1.	"Move!" (featuring Sister Souljah)		4:59
2.	"1 Million Bottlebags"		4:06
3.	"More News at 11"	Drayton Jr.; Rinaldo; Robertz	2:39

Side 4
No.	Title	Writer(s)	Length
1.	"Shut 'Em Down"		5:04
2.	"A Letter to the New York Post"	Drayton Jr.; Rinaldo; Robertz	2:45
3.	"Get the Fuck Outta Dodge" (featuring True Mathematics)	Kenny Houston; Ridenhour	2:38
4.	"Bring tha Noize" (with Anthrax)	Ridenhour; Eric Sadler; Keith Shocklee; Joseph Bellardini; Scott Ian; Frank Bello; Charlie Benante; Dan Spitz	3:34
Total length:			51:54

== Personnel ==
Public Enemy

- Chuck D
- Flavor Flav
- Terminator X

Additional personnel

- Anthrax – performer (track 14)
- Harry Allen – spoken word
- Frank Abel – keyboards
- Fred Wells – guitar
- Lorenzo "Tony" Wyche – horns
- Allen Givens – horns
- Ricky Gordon – percussion
- Tyrone Jefferson – horns
- Al MacDowell – bass guitar
- Steve Moss – percussion
- Michael Angelo – mixing

== Charts ==
Chart (1991)	Peak position
Australian Albums (ARIA)	11
Canadian Albums (Billboard)	12
Dutch Albums (Album Top 100)	62
German Albums (Offizielle Top 100)	38
New Zealand Albums (RMNZ)	5
Swedish Albums (Sverigetopplistan)	36
Swiss Albums (Schweizer Hitparade)	33
UK Albums (Official Charts)	8
US Billboard 200	4
US Top R&B/Hip-Hop Albums (Billboard)	1

== Certifications ==
Region	Certification	Certified units/sales
Canada (Music Canada)	Gold	50,000^{^}
United Kingdom (BPI)	Silver	60,000^{^}
United States (RIAA)	Platinum	1,000,000^{^}
^{^} Shipments figures based on certification alone.
