= Can't Truss It =

Single by Public Enemy

from the album Apocalypse 91... The Enemy Strikes Black
- Released: September 18, 1991
- Studio: The Music Palace (New York, NY)
- Genre: Hip hop
- Length: 5:21
- Label: Def Jam; Columbia
- Songwriters: Carlton Ridenhour; Stuart Robertz; Gary Rinaldo; Cerwin Depper
- Producer: The Imperial Grand Ministers Of Funk

Public Enemy singles chronology
"Can't Do Nuttin' for Ya Man" (1990)	"Can't Truss It" (1991)	"Shut 'Em Down" (1991)

Music video
- "Can't Truss It" on YouTube

Professional ratings
Review scores
Source	Rating
AllMusic	3/5 stars

"Can't Truss It" is a song by American hip hop group Public Enemy. It was released on September 18, 1991, through Def Jam Recordings as the lead single from the group's fourth studio album, Apocalypse 91... The Enemy Strikes Black (1991). Recording sessions took place at The Music Palace in Long Island. Production was handled by the Imperial Grand Ministers of Funk, with The Bomb Squad serving as executive producers. An accompanying music video was directed by Eric Meza.

In the United States, the song reached number 50 on the Billboard Hot 100, number 9 on both the Hot R&B/Hip-Hop Songs and Dance Singles Sales, and number-one on the Hot Rap Songs. It was certified Gold by the Recording Industry Association of America on December 3, 1991, for selling 500,000 copies in the US. It also made it to number 22 on the UK singles chart and number 24 in New Zealand.

In 2007, the song was used in the Ridley Scott-directed biographical crime film American Gangster and was included in its original motion picture soundtrack.

== Track listing ==
No.	Title	Length
1.	"Can't Truss It" (Almighty Raw 125th Street Bootleg Mix)
2.	"Can't Truss It" (Goree Island Conga Radio Mix)
3.	"Can't Truss It" (Instrumental)
4.	"Move!" (Censored Radio Version)

== Personnel ==
- Carlton "Chuck D" Ridenhour — songwriter
- Stuart Robertz — songwriter, producer
- Gary "G-Wiz" Rinaldo — songwriter, producer, mixing (track 1)
- Cerwin "C-Dawg" Depper — songwriter, producer
- "The JBL" — producer
- Bob Fudjinski — recording, mixing (tracks: 1, 3, 4)
- Mike Bona — mixing (track 2)
- Vlado Meller — mastering
- The Bomb Squad — executive producers

== Charts ==
Chart (1991)	Peak position
New Zealand (Recorded Music NZ)	24
UK Singles (OCC)	22
UK Dance (Music Week)	8
UK Club Chart (Record Mirror)	50
US Billboard Hot 100	50
US Hot R&B/Hip-Hop Songs (Billboard)	9
US Hot Rap Songs (Billboard)	1

== Certifications ==
Region	Certification	Certified units/sales
United States (RIAA)	Gold	500,000^{^}
^{^} Shipments figures based on certification alone.
