= Jason Clarke =

Australian actor (born 1969)

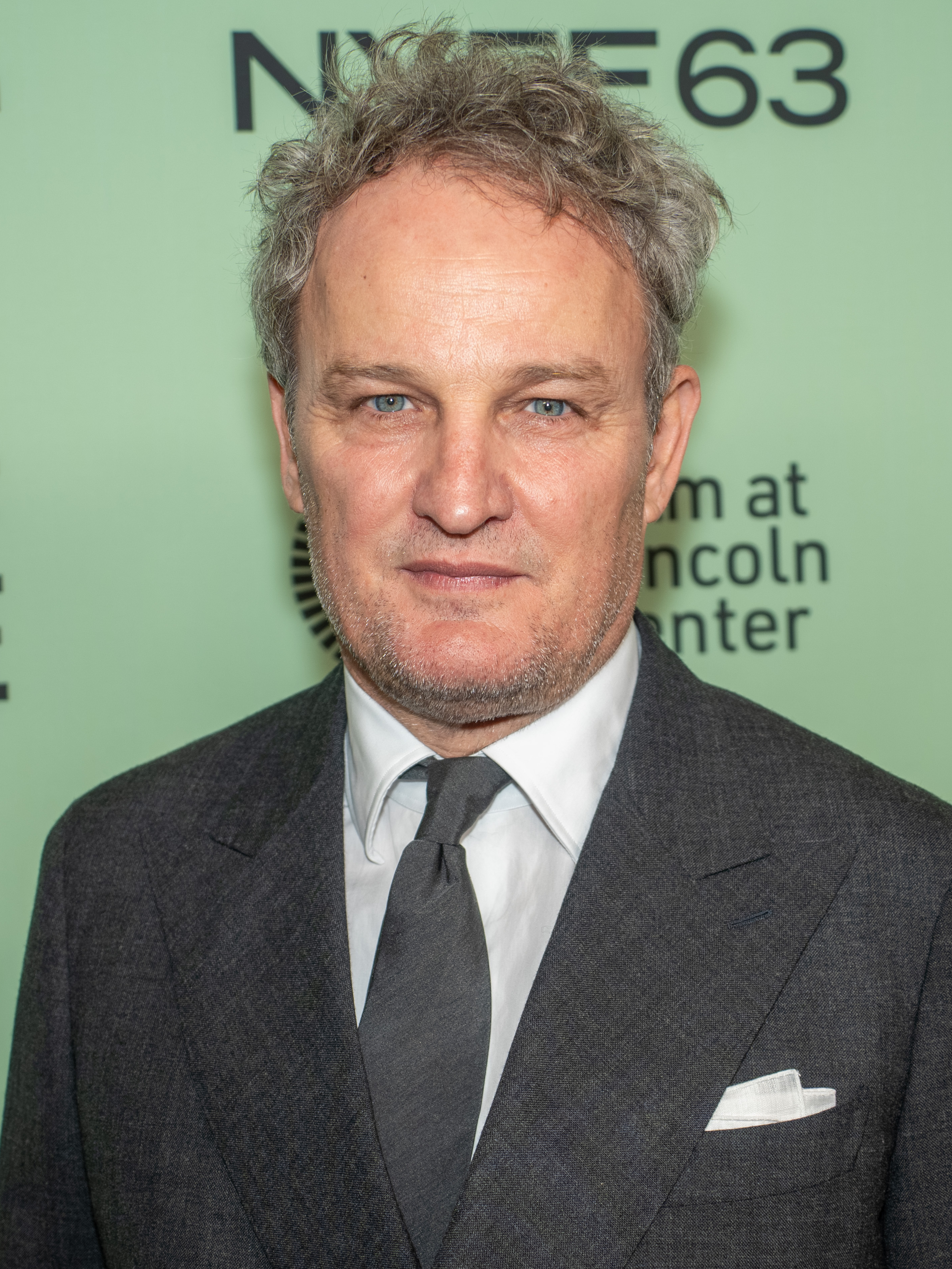
- Clarke at the 2025 New York Film Festival
- Born: 17 July 1969 (age 57); Winton, Queensland, Australia
- Occupation: Actor
- Years active: 1995–present
- Spouse: Cécile Breccia (m. 2018)
- Children: 2

Jason Clarke (born 17 July 1969) is an Australian actor. He has appeared in many TV series, and is known for playing Tommy Caffee on the television series Brotherhood. He has also appeared in many films, often as an antagonist. His film roles include Death Race (2008), Zero Dark Thirty (2012), Lawless (2012), White House Down (2013), Dawn of the Planet of the Apes (2014), Terminator Genisys (2015), Everest (2015), All I See Is You (2016), Mudbound (2017), The Man with the Iron Heart (2017), Chappaquiddick (2017), First Man (2018), Pet Sematary (2019), The Devil All the Time (2020), and Oppenheimer (2023). In 2022, he starred in the HBO sports drama series Winning Time: The Rise of the Lakers Dynasty as former Los Angeles Lakers player turned coach Jerry West.

== Early life ==
Clarke was born and brought up in Winton, Queensland. His father worked as a sheep shearer in rural South Australia outside a small township of Padthaway on the Limestone Coast. His family also lived in North Queensland, where Clarke completed his secondary schooling at Ignatius Park College. Clarke began studying law in 1987; however, before completing his studies, he chose to instead pursue acting as a career, enrolling in the Sydney Actor's Studio. He then went on to study at the Victorian College of the Arts in Melbourne, graduating in 1994.

== Career ==
Clarke has made many Australian television appearances, including Murder Call, Wildside, Home and Away, Heartbreak High, Blue Heelers, All Saints, Farscape, White Collar Blue, and Stingers. He played Tommy Caffee on the Showtime series Brotherhood. He has appeared in such films as Rabbit-Proof Fence (2002), Death Race (2008), and The Human Contract (2008).

Clarke played "Red" Hamilton in the 2009 film Public Enemies. In April 2010, he was cast in the thriller film Texas Killing Fields. He also played Detective Jarek Wysocki in the 2011 Fox series The Chicago Code and CIA interrogator Dan in the 2012 film Zero Dark Thirty. Clarke played a major role in the 2012 crime film Lawless. He played George Wilson in the 2013 remake of The Great Gatsby. Also in 2013, he played ruthless terrorist leader Emil Stenz in White House Down. He played Malcolm in the 2014 blockbuster film Dawn of the Planet of the Apes. In 2015's Terminator Genisys, Clarke portrayed John Connor, and the film grossed over $440 million worldwide. Also in 2015, he portrayed Rob Hall in Baltasar Kormákur's Everest, based on the 1996 Mount Everest disaster, and the film grossed $203 million worldwide. He then had roles in films such as All I See Is You (2016), Mudbound (2017), The Man with the Iron Heart (2017), Chappaquiddick (2017), and First Man (2018). In 2019, Clarke starred as Louis Creed in the new adaptation of Stephen King's novel, Pet Sematary. In 2020, he was in the thriller The Devil All the Time. From 2022 to 2023, he starred in the HBO sports drama series Winning Time: The Rise of the Lakers Dynasty as former Los Angeles Lakers player turned coach Jerry West. In 2023 he portrayed Roger Robb in Christopher Nolan's historical epic Oppenheimer and Lieutenant Barney Greenwald in William Friedkin's The Caine Mutiny Court-Martial.

== Personal life ==
Clarke is married to actress and model Cécile Breccia. They have two children.

== Filmography ==
=== Film ===
Year	Film	Role	Notes
1997	Dilemma	Guy	
1998	Twilight	Young cop	
1998	Praise	Frank	
1999	Schmooze	Band	Short film
1999	Kick	Nicholas Ratcliff	
2000	Our Lips Are Sealed	Mac	
2000	Risk	Chris	
2000	Better Than Sex	Guy C	
2002	Free		Short film
2002	Rabbit-Proof Fence	Constable Riggs	
2003	You Can't Stop the Murders	Slade	
2004	Get Rich Quick	Fenris	
2008	Hole in the Paper Sky	Howard Ferp	Short film
2008	Under Still Waters	Andrew	
2008	Death Race	T. Ulrich	
2008	The Human Contract	Julian Wright	
2009	Public Enemies	John "Red" Hamilton	
2010	Wall Street: Money Never Sleeps	New York Fed Chief	
2010	Trust	Doug Tate	
2011	Yelling to the Sky	Gordon O'Hara	
2011	Swerve	Frank	
2011	Texas Killing Fields	Rule	
2012	Lawless	Howard Bondurant	
2012	Zero Dark Thirty	Daniel Stanton	
2013	The Great Gatsby	George Wilson	
2013	White House Down	Emil Stenz	
2014	The Better Angels	Thomas Lincoln	
2014	Dawn of the Planet of the Apes	Malcolm	
2015	Knight of Cups	Johnny	
2015	Child 44	Anatoly Brodsky	
2015	Terminator Genisys	John Connor / T-3000	
2015	Everest	Rob Hall	
2016	All I See Is You	James	
2017	Mudbound	Henry McAllan	
2017	The Man with the Iron Heart	Reinhard Heydrich	
2017	Chappaquiddick	Ted Kennedy	
2018	Winchester	Eric Price	
2018	First Man	Ed White	
2019	Serenity	Frank Zariakas	
2019	The Aftermath	Lewis Morgan	
2019	Pet Sematary	Louis Creed	
2020	The Devil All the Time	Carl Henderson	
2021	Silk Road	Rick Bowden ("Jurassic Narc")	
2022	Black Site	Hatchet	
2023	Oppenheimer	Roger Robb	
2023	The Caine Mutiny Court-Martial	Lieutenant Barney Greenwald	
2025	A House of Dynamite	Admiral Mark Miller	
2026	A Statement	John Perry	
2027	F.A.S.T. †		Post-production
2027	A Quiet Place Part III †		Post-production
TBA	Wind River: The Next Chapter †		Post-production
TBA	Ally Clark †		Post-production
TBA	Supermax †		Filming

=== Television ===
Year	Film	Role	Notes
1995	Halifax f.p	Detective	Episode: "Hard Corps"
1995–99	Blue Heelers	Dean Crocker; Craig Dyer; Troy Harris	4 episodes
1996	Mercury	Nathan Cohen	2 episodes
1996	Diagnosis: Murder	Rick "Slick" Brooks	Episode: "A Model Murder"
1997	Knots Landing: Back to the Cul-de-Sac	Willy	Miniseries
1998	Heartbreak High	Warren	1 episode
1998	Wildside	Det. Con. Paul Moss	2 episodes
1998	Two Guys, a Girl and a Pizza Place	Hank	Episode: "Two Guys, a Girl and a Recovery"
1998	Murder Call	Zac Hartman	Episode: "A View to a Kill"
1999–2000	All Saints	Eddie Furlong	2 episodes
2000–03	Stingers	Brett Linton; Oliver Jensen	7 episodes
2001	Flat Chat		Episode: "Dark & Stormy Night"
2001	Head Start	Constable Rogers	Episode: "Out of the Blue"
2001	The Bill	Agent Vinten	Episode: "Beech on the Run"
2002	Home and Away	Christopher 'Kick' Johnson	5 episodes
2002	The Outsider	Ray Childress	TV film
2002–03	White Collar Blue	Ray Jarvis	2 episodes
2003	Farscape	Captain Jenek	4 episodes
2003	BlackJack	Tony Seaton (1973)	TV film
2006–08	Brotherhood	Tommy Caffee	29 episodes
2009	US Attorney	Michael Ryan	TV film
2011	The Chicago Code	Jarek Wysocki	13 episodes
2019	Catherine the Great	Grigory Potemkin	Miniseries, 4 episodes
2022–2023	Winning Time: The Rise of the Lakers Dynasty	Jerry West	Main role
2025	The Last Frontier	Frank Remnick	Lead role
2025	Murdaugh: Death in the Family	Alex Murdaugh	Lead role; miniseries

== Awards and nominations ==
Year	Award	Category	Nominated work	Result
2012	Chicago Film Critics Association	Best Supporting Actor	Zero Dark Thirty	Nominated
2012	Village Voice Film Poll	Best Supporting Actor	Zero Dark Thirty	Nominated
2017	Gotham Awards	Ensemble Performance	Mudbound	Won
2018	Independent Spirit Awards	Robert Altman Award (Best Ensemble)	Mudbound	Won
2018	Screen Actors Guild Award	Outstanding Performance by a Cast in a Motion Picture	Mudbound	Nominated
