= Shut 'Em Down (Public Enemy song) =

"Shut Em' Down"

Single by Public Enemy

from the album Apocalypse 91... The Enemy Strikes Black
- B-side: "By the Time I Get to Arizona"
- Released: 1991
- Studio: The Music Palace (Long Island, NY)
- Genre: Hip hop
- Length: 4:25
- Label: Def Jam; Columbia
- Songwriters: Carlton Ridenhour; Stuart Robertz; Gary Rinaldo; Cerwin Depper
- Producer: The Imperial Grand Ministers Of Funk

Public Enemy singles chronology
"Can't Truss It" (1991)	"Shut Em' Down" (1991)	"Nighttrain" (1992)

Music video
- "Shut 'Em Down" on YouTube

"Shut 'Em Down" is a song by American hip hop group Public Enemy. It was released in 1991 via Def Jam Recordings as the second single from the group's fourth studio album, Apocalypse 91... The Enemy Strikes Black (1991). Recording sessions took place at The Music Palace in Long Island. Production was handled by the Imperial Grand Ministers of Funk, with The Bomb Squad serving as executive producers. An accompanying music video was directed by Mark Pellington.

== Background ==
Public Enemy's Chuck D explained to Melody Maker in 1991: "'Shut 'Em Down' is about major corporations like Nike taking profits from the black community, but not giving anything back, never opening businesses in black areas. And it's saying that the best way to boycott a business is to start your own".

Part of group member Chuck D's voice was sampled on the track "Ten Crack Commandments" by The Notorious B.I.G. off his album Life After Death.

The opening of the song was used by Russell Simmons Television Productions (RSTV) during the closing credits of Def Comedy Jam.

This song was used in the 2008 thriller film Lakeview Terrace, the 2009 video game Madden NFL 10 and the 2014 video game NBA 2K15.

A mashup of the song with The Prodigy's "Stand Up" was created by fan Pony Sixfinger, who posted it on his YouTube channel. After Liam Howlett of the Prodigy saw it, the band released an official version of the mashup, the song "Shut 'Em Up". (The new release's title was a combination of the words from the two original songs' individual titles, making the title, like the song itself, a mashup). The song was included as a bonus track on the expanded edition of The Day Is My Enemy. The mashup, despite its themes, was eventually used in a commercial for Nike, and as the opening song for the Showtime documentary series Shut Up And Dribble. The song was also used in the movie Fist Fight.

== Track listing ==
No.	Title	Length
1.	"Shut Em Down" (Pe-Te Rock Mixx)	4:39
2.	"Shut Em Down" (Rock Mixx Instrumenta)	4:39
3.	"Shut Em Down" (LP Version)	4:25
4.	"Shut Em Down" (Bald Beat Breakapella)	3:04
5.	"By the Time I Get to Arizona"	4:00
6.	"By the Time I Get to Arizona" (Arizona Assassination Attempt Acca-Double Dub)	3:09
Total length:		24:01

== Personnel ==
- Carlton "Chuck D" Ridenhour — vocals
- Peter "Pete Rock" Phillips — re-mixing (tracks: 1, 2)
- Jamie Staub — remix engineering (tracks: 1, 2)
- Stuart Robertz — producer & programming (tracks: 3, 5)
- Gary "G-Wiz" Rinaldo — producer & programming (tracks: 3, 5)
- Cerwin "C-Dawg" Depper — producer (tracks: 3, 5)
- Keith "The JBL" Boxley — producer (tracks: 3, 5)
- Bob Fudjinski — engineering (tracks: 3, 5)
- Kirk Yano — engineering (tracks: 3, 5)
- Angelo Valensisi — engineering assistant (tracks: 3, 5)
- Carlos Savetman — engineering assistant (tracks: 3, 5)
- The Bomb Squad — producers (tracks: 4, 6), executive producers
- Kamron — additional scratches
- Tony Dawsey — mastering

== Charts ==
Chart (1991–92)	Peak position
Australia (ARIA)	161
New Zealand (Recorded Music NZ)	30
UK Singles (OCC)	21
UK Dance (Music Week)	6
UK Club Chart (Music Week)	63
US Hot R&B/Hip-Hop Songs (Billboard)	26
US Hot Rap Songs (Billboard)	1
