= Cécile Breccia =

French Italian actress

Cécile Breccia is a French actress and model best known for her role as Lt. Link Manion in the 2008 American military science fiction film Starship Troopers 3: Marauder. Her other notable films include 99 Francs (2007) and The Hills Have Eyes 2.

== Biography ==
Cécile Breccia was born in Paris, to an Italian father (a documentary filmmaker specializing in history) and a French mother (an actress and painter).

At the age of 8, she began acting classes, and later she studied drama at Cours Florent.

She first appeared in 2004 French action crime series Lea Parker. Her first major role came in Lionel Delplanque's 2006 drama thriller film Président.

== Personal life ==
She has been in a relationship with Australian actor Jason Clarke since 2010. The pair have two sons born in 2014 and 2019, and in 2018 announced they had married.

== Filmography ==
=== Film ===
Year	Title	Role	Notes
2006	Président	L'actrice	
2007	The Hills Have Eyes 2	Pregnant Woman	
2007	99 Francs	Mannequin Photo	
2008	Starship Troopers 3: Marauder	Lt. Link Manion	
2008	A French Gigolo	Elodie	
2009	Cyprien	Gina McQueen	
2009	The Missionary	Sandy	

=== Television ===
Year	Title	Role	Notes
2006	The Crime	Rosalie Berdet	
2006	David Nolande	Caroline	
2007	Reporters	Violaine	
