= Jamin Winans =

American filmmaker (born 1977)

- Born: September 4, 1977 (age 49); Fort Wayne, Indiana, U.S.
- Occupations: Filmmaker, composer

Jamin Winans (born December 4, 1977) is an American filmmaker and composer. He is known for his short film Spin (2005) and feature films 11:59 (2005), Ink (2009), The Frame (2014) and Myth of Man (2025).

== Early life and education ==
Winans was born in Fort Wayne, Indiana, and moved with his family to Denver, Colorado when he was five. Later moving to nearby Evergreen, Colorado, he attended Bergen Elementary, and began making movies with pieces of string and cardboard at age 10. In an extended interview with Jason Heller of Westword, Winans recalls,

We didn't have a TV until I was ten ... My parents were just not fans of having a TV in the house. I remember when I was little, my dad rented a TV and a VCR one night just to watch The Blues Brothers. It was crazy. It was a big thing. For me, seeing TV or a movie had a huge impact. It was magical.

After high school at Evergreen High School, he attended Columbia College Hollywood in Los Angeles before dropping out and pursuing filmmaking in Colorado.

== Production company ==
Winans created Double Edge Films in 1998. Winans plays various roles in each film, most significantly as writer, director, and editor, and more recently composing scores; his spouse, Kiowa Winans, is intimately involved with the effort, in roles as producer, but also in art direction, and sound and costume design. Jamin Winans began showing shorts at film festivals around the U.S. in 2001.

== Film career ==
Winans made his first short film, Blanston (2003), a film depicting four people trying to pull an insurance scam on the company they worked for. His next, a short called The Maze (2003), is about a physicist trying to understand the science of the universe. Next, Winans released Spin (2005), the story of a DJ trying to fix a chain of events unfolding a city's downtown area, a film that has won multiple film festival awards, including Best Live Action Short and The Bruce Corwin Award at the 2006 Santa Barbara Independent Film Festival. His first feature, 11:59 (2005), portrays a photojournalist trying to remember what happened in the last twenty-four hours of his life, and premiered at the 2005 Montreal World Film Festival.

Winans next released Ink (2009), a film portraying the struggle of a father trying to save his comatose daughter, who is floating between dreams and nightmares. In the first week of its release, Ink shot into the Top 20 movies on IMDb due to being heavily pirated on peer-to-peer networks.

In late 2014, Winans released his latest feature film, The Frame, which he wrote, directed, edited, and scored. The Frame is about two strangers colliding in an impossible way - taking on the very root of fate, destiny, and their own existence, they race through a maze of an ever-changing universe while being pursued by a demonic man determined to erase the world.

Winans released his first documentary Childhood 2.0 in 2020 about the impacts of social media on children. A new sci-fi fantasy narrative feature, Myth of Man was announced on the Double Edge Films website, releasing worldwide on March 25, 2025. In addition to films, Winans also works on commercials.

== Musical composition ==
Winans also composes music for original film scores. Winans composed the musical score for Ink (2009), and his song, The City Surf from Ink was used in the 2011 Liam Neeson wilderness survival film, The Grey, in conjunction with a score composed by Marc Streitenfeld.

== Filmography ==
Short film

Year	Title	Director	Writer	Editor	Composer
2003	Blanston	Yes	Yes	Yes	Yes
2003	The Maze	Yes	Yes	Yes	Yes
2005	Spin	Yes	Yes	Yes	Yes
2010	Uncle Jack	Yes	Yes	Yes	Yes

Feature film

Year	Title	Director	Writer	Executive Producer	Editor	Composer	Notes
2005	11:59	Yes	Yes	Yes	Yes	No	
2009	Ink	Yes	Yes	Yes	Yes	Yes	
2014	The Frame	Yes	Yes	No	Yes	Yes	
2020	Childhood 2.0	Yes	No	No	Yes	Yes	Documentary; Co-directed with Robert Muratore and Kiowa K. Winans
2025	Myth of Man	Yes	Yes	No	Yes	Yes	Also cinematographer

== Personal life ==
Winans is married to production collaborator Kiowa Winans, a native of Colorado whose family was originally from New England.
