= A French Gigolo =

2008 film directed by Josiane Balasko

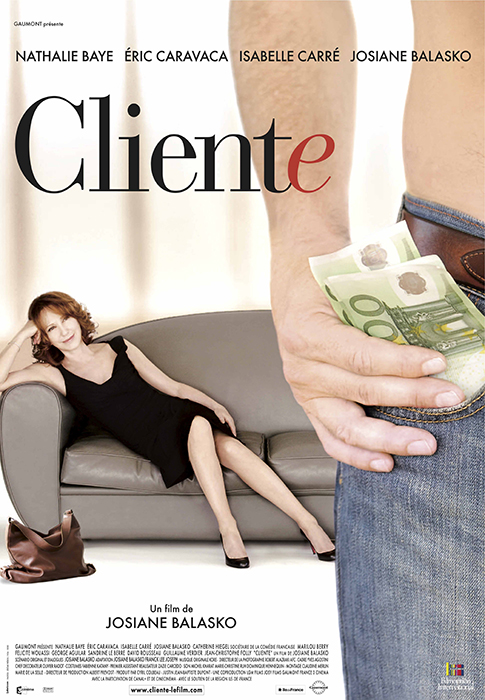
- Theatrical release poster
- French: Cliente
- Directed by: Josiane Balasko
- Screenplay by: Josiane Balasko
- Adaptation by: Josiane Balasko; Franck Lee Joseph
- Produced by: Cyril Colbeau-Justin; Jean-Baptiste Dupont
- Starring: Nathalie Baye; Éric Caravaca; Isabelle Carré; Josiane Balasko; Catherine Hiegel; Marilou Berry; Félicité Wouassi; George Aguilar; Sandrine Le Berre; David Rousseau; Guillaume Verdier; Jean-Christophe Folly
- Cinematography: Robert Alazraki
- Edited by: Claudine Merlin; Marie de la Selle
- Music by: Kore
- Production companies: LGM Films; Josy Films; Gaumont; France 3 Cinéma
- Distributed by: Gaumont
- Release date: 1 October 2008 (France)
- Running time: 104 minutes
- Country: France
- Language: French
- Budget: $8.4 million
- Box office: $6 million

A French Gigolo (French: Cliente) is a 2008 French comedy-drama film directed by Josiane Balasko and starring Nathalie Baye, Éric Caravaca, Isabelle Carré and Balasko.

== Plot ==
Patrick is a male prostitute who hides his double life from his wife. When she finds out about his extramarital activities by answering his phone, she decides she will catch him in a hotel room with a client. At first offended by the behavior of her husband, she soon asks him to continue to be a male escort to help pay the bills. Patrick meets a female client, Judith, with whom they live out a complicated love story.

== Cast ==
- Nathalie Baye as Judith
- Éric Caravaca as Marco
- Isabelle Carré as Fanny
- Josiane Balasko as Irène
- Catherine Hiegel as Maggy
- Marilou Berry as Karine
- Félicité Wouassi as Rosalie
- George Aguilar as Jim
- Sandrine Le Berre as Bérénice
- David Rousseau as Alex
- Guillaume Verdier as Zoltan
- Jean-Christophe Folly as Toutoune
- Richard Berry as Lucas
- Maria Schneider as Marie-Hélène
- Arnaud Valois as Sylvain
- Cécile Breccia as Elodie
- Guillaume Nicloux as Jean-Louis
- Rudy Berry as Jonathan
- Gérard Krawczyk as the bar's patron

== Development ==
A French Gigolo premiered at the Rome Film Festival in October 2008. The film was also screened at the 2009 Seattle International Film Festival.
