= All I See Is You =

- Theatrical release poster
- Directed by: Marc Forster
- Written by: Marc Forster; Sean Conway
- Produced by: Craig Baumgarten; Jillian Kugler; Brian Wilkins
- Starring: Blake Lively; Jason Clarke; Ahna O'Reilly; Yvonne Strahovski; Wes Chatham; Danny Huston
- Cinematography: Matthias Koenigswieser
- Edited by: Hughes Winborne
- Music by: Marc Streitenfeld
- Production companies: SC International Pictures; Wing and a Prayer Pictures; LINK Entertainment
- Distributed by: Open Road Films
- Release dates: September 14, 2016 (TIFF); October 27, 2017 (United States)
- Running time: 110 minutes
- Countries: United States; Thailand
- Language: English
- Budget: $30 million
- Box office: $678,150

All I See Is You is a 2016 psychological drama film directed by Marc Forster and written by Forster and Sean Conway. The film stars Blake Lively and Jason Clarke.

The plot is the story of a married couple whose dynamic changes when the once blind Gina begins to recover her sight, which her husband James has difficulty accepting.

The film was screened in the Special Presentations section at the 2016 Toronto International Film Festival. It was released by Open Road Films (the company's last film before 2020's Honest Thief) in around 250 theaters in the United States on October 27, 2017.

== Plot ==
Married couple Gina and James live together happily despite her dependence on him due to her blindness. He appears to enjoy the dependence, saying that it makes him feel special. As they try for a baby, Gina prepares for a cornea transplant, which will restore the sight in one of her eyes. The surgery is a success, and she embraces her newfound independence. Immediately, their sex life suffers.

To put the spark back into their marriage, James books them a holiday to Spain, promising Gina that he has reserved the same hotel room they had on their honeymoon. Upon their arrival, she insists the room is not the same, which he denies. Gina is later proven to be correct.

During the trip, Gina is shown to be growing in independence and confidence while James is left behind, seemingly unable to connect to the new, independent version of her that no longer depends on him. Resentful, James begins to show signs of possessiveness.

On their way to Barcelona, they attempt to have sex on a sleeper train. James, blindfolded, demands to know who Gina fantasizes about when she masturbates, doubtful when she answers that she only thinks of him. She finally reveals that she does think of other men. James later watches a video of the encounter, obsessed with his helplessness and Gina's emotionless face.

In Barcelona, Gina and James arrive at her sister's. One night, Gina visits a peep show with her sister and brother-in-law. James declines their invitation to join and appears uncomfortable when Gina's brother-in-law jokingly suggests that, now that she can see, Gina may find someone better looking.

While walking back to the house, Gina is groped by a stranger on the street, whom her brother-in-law punches. Back at her sister and brother-in-law's house, James is mad at Gina for embarrassing him in front of her sister when she gets mad at him for not sticking up for her.

Back home in Thailand, Gina begins to have trouble with her vision: her eyes water unusually, and her vision worsens. Confused and terrified by her returning blindness, she brings her eye drops to her doctor, who promises to test them for contamination. James learns that he is sterile but does not tell Gina.

While James purchases a new house at Gina's insistence, Gina begins to flirt with Daniel, an attractive man she meets at the public pool. When her dog overheats during a walk, Daniel offers to take them back to his home for water, where he and Gina have sex. She later reveals to James that she is pregnant, unintentionally confirming her affair as she is unaware of his infertility, but James does not confront her. Similarly, when Gina learns from her doctor that her eye drops have been tampered with, she does not confront him. Their home is broken into and their dog is stolen.

Sometime later, a visibly pregnant Gina is apparently having trouble with her vision, now in need of her old cane and aid from James. She and James move into their new house. At one point, James tests Gina's blindness, intentionally hiding from her in her blind spot. He makes plans to meet her at a local school for a talent show in which she is performing.

While he is gone, Gina receives an anonymous letter, written in crayon, which reveals that James was who staged the home invasion and released their dog. The writer claims to have rescued the dog but refuses to return it because "when I look into her eyes, she looks back at me, and that is called love."

James goes to their old apartment to collect the last of his and Gina's belongings. In the bathroom, he uncovers a stash of empty eye drop bottles. He realizes that Gina discovered his deception and secretly continued to obtain eye drops from the doctor, meaning that she has been faking her returning blindness. She confirms this when she looks directly at him during the talent show. Distraught, James drives home and suddenly his eyes begin to tear which could indicate crying or perhaps something more sinister has taken place. Either way he gets a taste of what it’s like to be blind for a few moments. Suddenly a truck comes into view which could be interpreted as either James crashing into it or it could be the truck that killed Gina’s parents since the scene morphs into her bloodied eye as a child right after the accident.

After Gina gives birth, she and her baby see each other for the first time.

== Cast ==
- Blake Lively as Gina
- Jason Clarke as James
- Ahna O'Reilly as Carla
- Yvonne Strahovski as Karen
- Wes Chatham as Daniel
- Danny Huston as Doctor Hughes

== Production ==
In February 2015, Blake Lively and Jason Clarke joined the cast of the film, with Marc Forster directing from the screenplay he co-wrote with Sean Conway. In June 2015, Yvonne Strahovski joined the cast of the film. The film was shot on location in Thailand (Bangkok and Phuket) and Spain (Barcelona and Buñol).

== Release ==
In October 2016, Open Road Films acquired U.S. distribution rights to the film, and set it for a release on August 4, 2017. The release was pushed back one month to September 15, 2017, and then was pushed back again for a release date of October 27, 2017. The film was released on DVD and Blu-ray on February 6, 2018.

== Reception ==
=== Box office ===
All I See Is You grossed $217,644 in North America and $460,506 in other countries for a worldwide total of $678,150, against a production budget of $30 million.

=== Critical response ===
On review aggregator Rotten Tomatoes, the film holds a "Rotten" 30% rating based on 54 reviews, with an average rating of 4.5/10. The site's critical consensus reads, "All I See Is You hints at a number of intriguing questions with its premise, but they dissolve in a stylish yet empty psychodrama that fails to connect." On Metacritic, the film has a score 43 out of 100, based on 25 critics, indicating "mixed or average" reviews.
