= Body of Lies (soundtrack) =

Soundtrack album by Marc Streitenfeld
- Released: October 14, 2008
- Recorded: June 2008
- Genre: Soundtrack
- Length: 45:06
- Label: Varèse Sarabande

Marc Streitenfeld chronology
| American Gangster (2007) | Body of Lies (2008) | Robin Hood (2010) |

Body of Lies is the soundtrack of the film of the same name. It was released on October 14, 2008, by Varèse Sarabande. German-born film composer Marc Streitenfeld reunited with director Ridley Scott to score the film, marking his third score in a row and eighth consecutive music collaboration with Scott.

Streitenfeld traveled to Morocco to collaborate with Scott for the spy film, which required a score to support its technological and political style. Streitenfeld used a 90-piece orchestra as well as woods and choir to create the score. Recording all the elements separately allowed Streitenfeld to have more command over the final sound mix.

== Track listing ==
1. "White Whale" – 2:14
2. "Punishment" – 1:36
3. "To Amman" – 2:42
4. "Aisha" – 2:11
5. "All by Himself" – 1:32
6. "Burning Safehouse" – 1:46
7. "Al-Saleem" – 2:05
8. "Manchester Raid" – 2:40
9. "Chased" – 1:35
10. "NSA Speech" – 2:46
11. "Tortured" – 2:13
12. "Dead Sea" – 1:16
13. "No Touch" – 1:21
14. "I Am Out" – 2:37
15. "Rabid Dogs" – 2:49
16. "Lost Vision" – 2:00
17. "Never Lie to Me" – 1:14
18. "I Shutter to Think" – 2:27
19. "Half Steps" – 1:28
20. "Making the Call" – 1:11
21. "My Fault" – 1:53
22. "Betrayal" – 3:31
