= True Mathematics =

American rapper

Kenny Houston a.k.a. True Mathematics is a rapper from Hempstead, New York. He released an album called "Greatest Hits" as a collaboration with Hank Shocklee (Public Enemy), Eric Sadler, Carl Ryder (a.k.a. Chuck D), and spawned four singles: "After Dark", which charted at #92 on the UK Singles Chart; For the Lover in You; I Don't Love You Anymore; For the Money/KAOss, which also charted at #92 on the UK Singles Chart. He also contributed to the Public Enemy song "Get the Fuck Outta Dodge", which was the B-Side to their single "Can't Do Nuttin' For Ya Man" from their album Fear of a Black Planet and also appeared on their album Apocalypse '91...The Enemy Strikes Black.
