= Do You Feel Me =

Single by Anthony Hamilton

from the album American Gangster (Original Motion Picture Soundtrack)
- Released: October 2, 2007
- Recorded: 2007
- Genre: R&B, soul
- Length: 3:56
- Label: Def Jam
- Songwriter: Diane Warren
- Producer: Hank Shocklee

Anthony Hamilton singles chronology
"Struggle No More (The Main Event)" (2007)	"Do You Feel Me" (2007)

"Do You Feel Me" is a radio-only single by American R&B/soul singer, Anthony Hamilton. The song written by Diane Warren and produced by production team The Bomb Squad member Hank Shocklee, was featured in the soundtrack to the 2007 film American Gangster. The song was ranked number forty-six on Rolling Stone's list of the "100 Best Songs of 2007".

It was released to US urban AC radios on October 2, 2007.
