= American Gangster (soundtrack) =

Soundtrack to the 2007 film American Gangster

American Gangster (Original Motion Picture Soundtrack)

Soundtrack album by various artists
- Released: October 23, 2007 (digital); October 30, 2007 (physical)
- Genres: Blues; soul
- Length: 45:34
- Labels: Island; Def Jam
- Producer: Marc Streitenfeld

Singles from American Gangster (Original Motion Picture Soundtrack)
- 1. "Do You Feel Me" Released: October 2, 2007

American Gangster (Original Motion Picture Soundtrack) is the soundtrack to the Ridley Scott-directed 2007 film American Gangster. It consisted of fourteen tracks from blues and soul musicians such as such as Bobby Womack, The Staple Singers, Sam & Dave, and John Lee Hooker. The soundtrack was described as an introduction to the visual and sonic world that "contained entity of the 1970s". It also includes two cues from the film score Marc Streitenfeld, who also produced the soundtrack. It was released by Island Records and Def Jam Recordings digitally on October 23, 2007, and followed a physical release, the week later.

== Background ==
In 2006, Greg Calloway was approached by Brian Grazer and Ron Howard (the producers) to produce a soundtrack for the film, who presented this idea to Atlantic Records chairman Craig Kallman. However, since Universal Pictures owned the rights of the film, the company refused to give the soundtrack rights to Warner Music Group which was Atlantic's parent company, ultimately abandoning his recruitment. Thus, Scott brought in composer Marc Streitenfeld to score music for the film as well as producing the soundtrack. Streitenfeld was introduced by Scott as a film composer for his 2006 film A Good Year. When he read the script, he described the standout of the film, were the strong characters, mostly that of Denzel Washington whose character had an "intense personality". He was invited by Scott in the edit room to share the cues he wrote down based on the script and resonated well with the film. However, Streitenfeld changed some of the cues during the edit.

Drawing inspiration from the 1970s musician, an original song "Do You Feel Me" was written by Diane Warren and performed by Anthony Hamilton, released as a single on October 2, 2007. After viewing an early screening of the film, Def Jam's president and rapper Jay-Z, who was "deeply moved" by Washington's performance as Frank Lucas, inspired to create an album drawing his past experiences as an hustler and drug dealer, parallel to the criminal's life. The album which was titled after the film, released on the same date as the film's premiere. The Thai version of Only the Lonely featured in the film was not included in the release of the soundtrack.

== Track listing ==
No.	Title	Artist(s)	Length
1.	"Do You Feel Me"	Anthony Hamilton	3:56
2.	"Why Don't We Do It in the Road?"	Lowell Fulson	3:46
3.	"No Shoes"	John Lee Hooker	2:25
4.	"Across 110th Street"	Bobby Womack	3:47
5.	"Stone Cold"	Anthony Hamilton	4:06
6.	"Hold On, I'm Comin'"	Sam & Dave	2:32
7.	"I'll Take You There"	The Staple Singers	4:35
8.	"Can't Truss It"	Public Enemy	4:39
9.	"Checkin' Up on My Baby"	Hank Shocklee	2:12
10.	"Club Jam"	Hank Shocklee	3:11
11.	"Railroad"	Hank Shocklee	2:21
12.	"Nicky Barnes"	Hank Shocklee	3:11
13.	"Hundred Percent Pure"	Marc Streitenfeld	2:13
14.	"Frank Lucas"	Marc Streitenfeld	2:40
Total length:			45:34

== Charts ==
Chart (2007)	Peak position
US Billboard 200	5
US Top Soundtracks (Billboard)	1

== Original score ==
American Gangster (Original Motion Picture Score)

Soundtrack album by Marc Streitenfeld
- Released: February 19, 2008
- Recorded: April–May 2007
- Venues: Sony Scoring Stage, Culver City, California
- Genre: Film score
- Length: 45:34
- Label: Varèse Sarabande
- Producer: Marc Streitenfeld

Singles from American Gangster (Original Motion Picture Soundtrack)
- 1. "Do You Feel Me" Released: October 2, 2007

Streitenfeld recorded the score during April and May 2007, with an 80-piece orchestra from the Hollywood Studio Symphony led by orchestrator Bruce Fowler and conductor Mike Nowak, recorded the score at Sony Scoring Stage in Culver City, California. Streitenfeld also pre-recorded acoustic materials whilst additional score has been composed and recorded by Hank Shocklee. The score was not released in conjunction with the film as Streitenfeld intended for additional mixes and mastering and instead was published by Varèse Sarabande on February 19, 2008. The album includes 39 minutes of the score, while the film has over 100 minutes of music being used.

Streitenfeld's score met with positive response. AllMusic's James Leonard wrote "Streitenfeld doesn't quote from the popular music of 1970s Harlem, but through biting themes, insidious harmonies, and bass-driven rhythms he succeeds in evoking its atmosphere". Filmtracks.com wrote "a very effective score overall, one that presents challenges on album because of its distinctive attitude, but you can't help but admire how Streitenfeld handled this assignment".

Track listing
No.	Title	Artist(s)	Length
1.	"The Process"		2:13
2.	"Frank Lucas"		2:40
3.	"Hundred Percent Pure"		2:11
4.	"Fire"		1:54
5.	"The Arrival"		1:03
6.	"Suspects"		2:01
7.	"Caskets"		2:41
8.	"Kill No Cop"		2:20
9.	"Shakedown"		1:24
10.	"Turkeys"		1:49
11.	"The Fight"		3:16
12.	"Headlights"		2:19
13.	"The Raid"		3:16
14.	"The Morgue"		1:29
15.	"Chinchilla Coat"		2:42
16.	"Afro Beat" (bonus)	Hank Shocklee	1:45
17.	"Back to Bangkok Blues" (bonus)	Harry Garfield	2:08
18.	"Hallway" (bonus)	Hank Shocklee	1:42
Total length:			38:53

== Accolades ==
Award	Category	Recipient	Result
BAFTA Awards	Best Music	Marc Streitenfeld	Nominated
Satellite Awards	Best Original Song	Anthony Hamilton and Diane Warren For the song "Do You Feel Me"	Nominated
World Soundtrack Awards	Best Original Song Written Directly for a Film	Anthony Hamilton and Diane Warren For the song "Do You Feel Me"	Nominated
World Soundtrack Awards	Discovery of the Year	Marc Streitenfeld	Won
