= Harry Allen (journalist) =

American journalist (born 1963)

- Born: November 27, 1963 (age 62); New York City, U.S.
- Education: Adelphi University
- Occupations: Journalist, activist
- Writing career
- Subjects: Public Enemy, hip hop

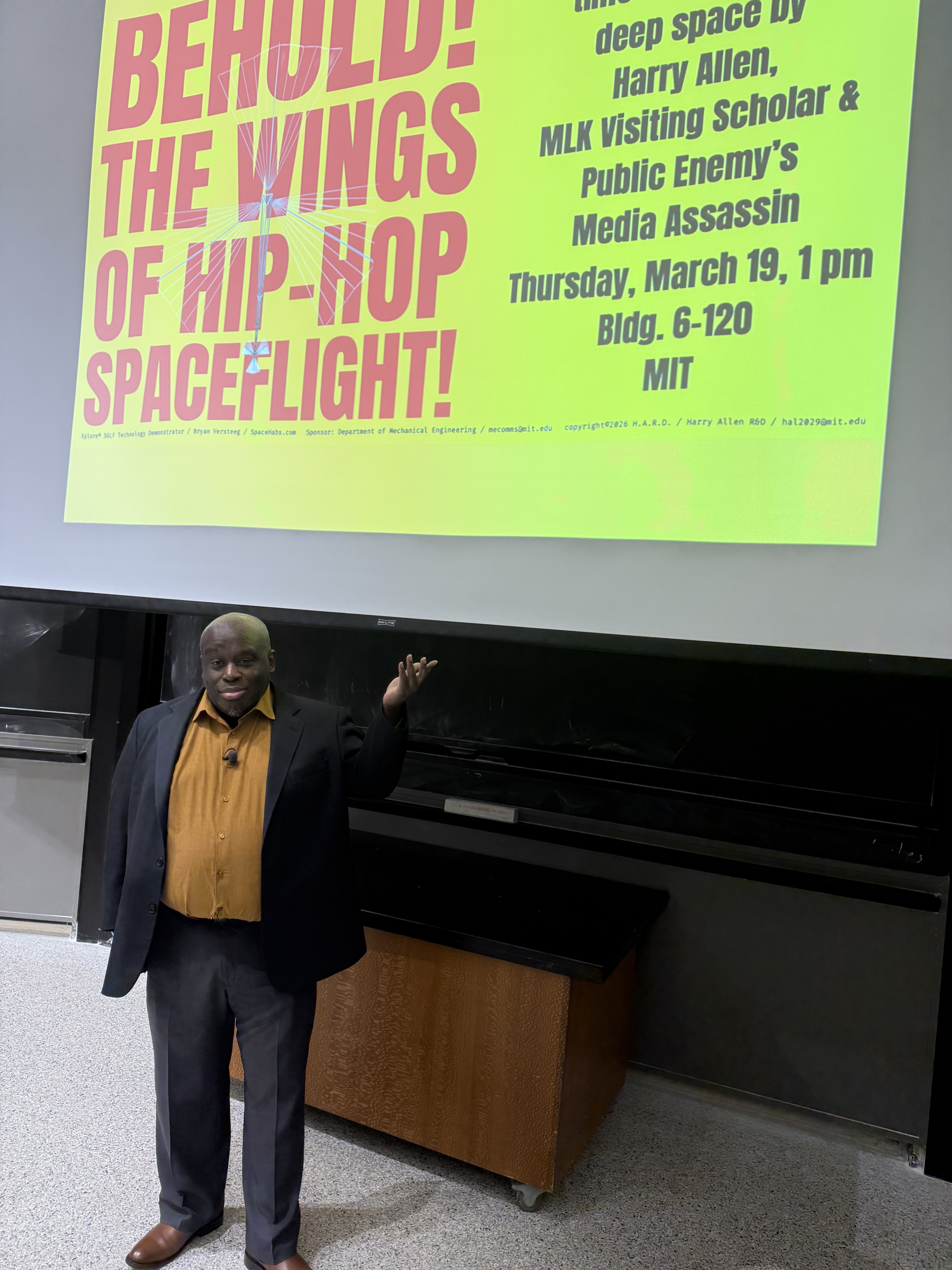
Harry Allen, MLK Visiting Scholar at MIT, March 19, 2026.

Harry Allen (born November 27, 1963, in Bushwick, Brooklyn, New York) is an American hip hop activist and journalist ("The Media Assassin") affiliated with the group Public Enemy, and is the director of the Rhythm Cultural Institute. He grew up in Freeport, Long Island.

From September 2025 to August 2026, he was appointed as an MLK Visiting Scholar at the Massachusetts Institute of Technology where he is working on his Hip Hop Deep Space Monument (HHDSM) project.

== Beginnings ==
Harry Allen first met Carlton "Chuck D" Ridenhour in 1982, when the two took a graphic design class at Adelphi University in Garden City. Ridenhour, also a member of hip hop group Spectrum City, introduced Allen to a clique who congregated around university radio station WBAU/90.3 FM on Monday nights (although not all were students), and, in Allen's own words, "looked at hip-hop scientifically, as an analysis of its parts, and took it completely seriously, like I did." This included Flavor Flav and Terminator X (who, along with Chuck D, would form the core of Public Enemy), Spectrum City founders Hank and Keith Shocklee (who, along with Chuck D and Eric "Vietnam" Sadler, would form PE's legendary production team, The Bomb Squad), future Def Jam President Bill Stephney, and Andre "Doctor Dré" Brown, best known for later co-hosting Yo! MTV Raps.

Although it would still be a number of years before Long Island produced its own stars, Allen was brought into direct contact with hip hop at a pivotal moment in its development. In 1983, WBAU/90.3 would be the first radio station to play Run-DMC's seminal classic "Sucker M.C.'s" and possibly the first to interview the Hollis, Queens trio that would go on to be hip hop's first platinum act. It was during this time that Allen would flirt with a career in photography, capturing the local scene and visiting New York City stars, as well as a change of scenery after transferring to Brooklyn College - until abruptly ending this hobby in 1986.

== Career ==
Allen's first published article was "one of the first pieces to illuminate the political ideology behind Public Enemy, whose militant demeanor and confrontational lyrics initially confused and baffled the mainstream white press." After a 1989 Washington Times interview with Professor Griff brought accusations of anti-Semitism against PE, "Allen was the natural choice to negotiate the love-hate relationship between PE and the press," and began identifying himself as a "hip hop activist and media assassin," becoming the group's publicist as "director of Enemy relations." He also wrote on a variety of topics for The Village Voice (between 2002 and 2008), Essence, Spin and Vibe.

Making his first recorded appearance on Public Enemy's 1988 track "Don't Believe the Hype", Allen responds to Flavor Flav's concluding question, "Yo Harry, you're a writer, are we that type?", answering, "Don't believe the hype." He also made a visual appearance on Tour of a Black Planet video, stating:

Well, what black people should do when they're seeking justice is ask for justice, accept what they've given, and then compensate for the difference. Black people usually don't compensate for the difference—they usually accept what's given. What we need to do is bust through the wall by any means necessary.

Allen also appears on the chorus of "More News At 11", from Apocalypse 91...The Enemy Strikes Black, and 1994's Muse Sick-N-Hour Mess Age features a voicemail-message skit, entitled "Harry Allen's Interactive Super Highway Phone Call To Chuck D."

Allen was an early proponent of the Internet, creating an online presence for PE in 1991, publishing the webzine Rap Dot Com, and leading a panel discussion on music and the Internet—with Chuck D and Adam Curry—during the 1994 New Music Seminar. Allen stated on his radio show: "anyone can be on the Internet, and now anyone is on the Internet." During this period, Allen also worked for Hank Shocklee's record label, Soul Records.

Allen also founded the Rhythm Cultural Institute in 1992, with KRS-One and others, which moderates and hosts seminars, and has undertaken research into the methodology necessary to create a fitting "Hip Hop Hall of Fame". In 1995, the mission of the Institute was: "capturing, keeping for the future, aggressively defining, and promoting the expansion of hip hop music and culture." In a 1995 Wired magazine interview, Allen spoke about hip hop in relation to technology:

That African Americans are alienated from technology is a myth. There is far more evidence showing quite the opposite. When useful technology is not kept from us by white people who practice racism, or when it is not used to oppress us, we usually find energetic ways to get a new maximum out of it. Additionally, I say that the power of hip hop lies in its ability to radically combine sounds, imagery, text, and other media within its form.

Allen hosts an "on-air magazine" on WBAI-NY/99.5 FM called Nonfiction, started in 2003, and he has interviewed guests such as Talking Heads bassist Tina Weymouth, physicists Brian Greene and Lisa Randall, and Black Panther Party activist Kathleen Cleaver.

Allen was employed by Rockstar Games from 2004 to 2006, in the public affairs department, and his personal website states: "He [Allen] considers his credit on the hit title Grand Theft Auto: San Andreas his proudest byline."

On June 28, 2007, an exhibition of his photography, entitled Part of the Permanent Record: Photos From the Previous Century, opened at the Eyejammie Fine Arts Gallery in Manhattan, a gallery that specialized in hip hop-related art, founded and owned by Bill Adler, former Def Jam director of media relations. The exhibition, which ran until August of that year, was re-mounted at the University of Iowa’s Black Box Theater from March 27 through June 27, 2010.

As of September 2014, Allen serves as an advisor to the Archives of African American Music and Culture (AAAMC), at Indiana University, is represented by the APB Speakers International speakers bureau, and published the blog Media Assassin.

In October 2017, he visited honorary Professor Kajakawa at the University of Oregon and spoke to students about his life story.

=== Research interests ===
Allen is a two time Nasir Jones Hiphop Fellow at the Marcyliena Morgan Hip Hop Archive at Harvard University's Hutchins Center for African and African American Research (2016-2017; 2024-2025). At Harvard, Allen's focus was two research projects: Hypertext ('16-17) and harbanger ('24-'25).

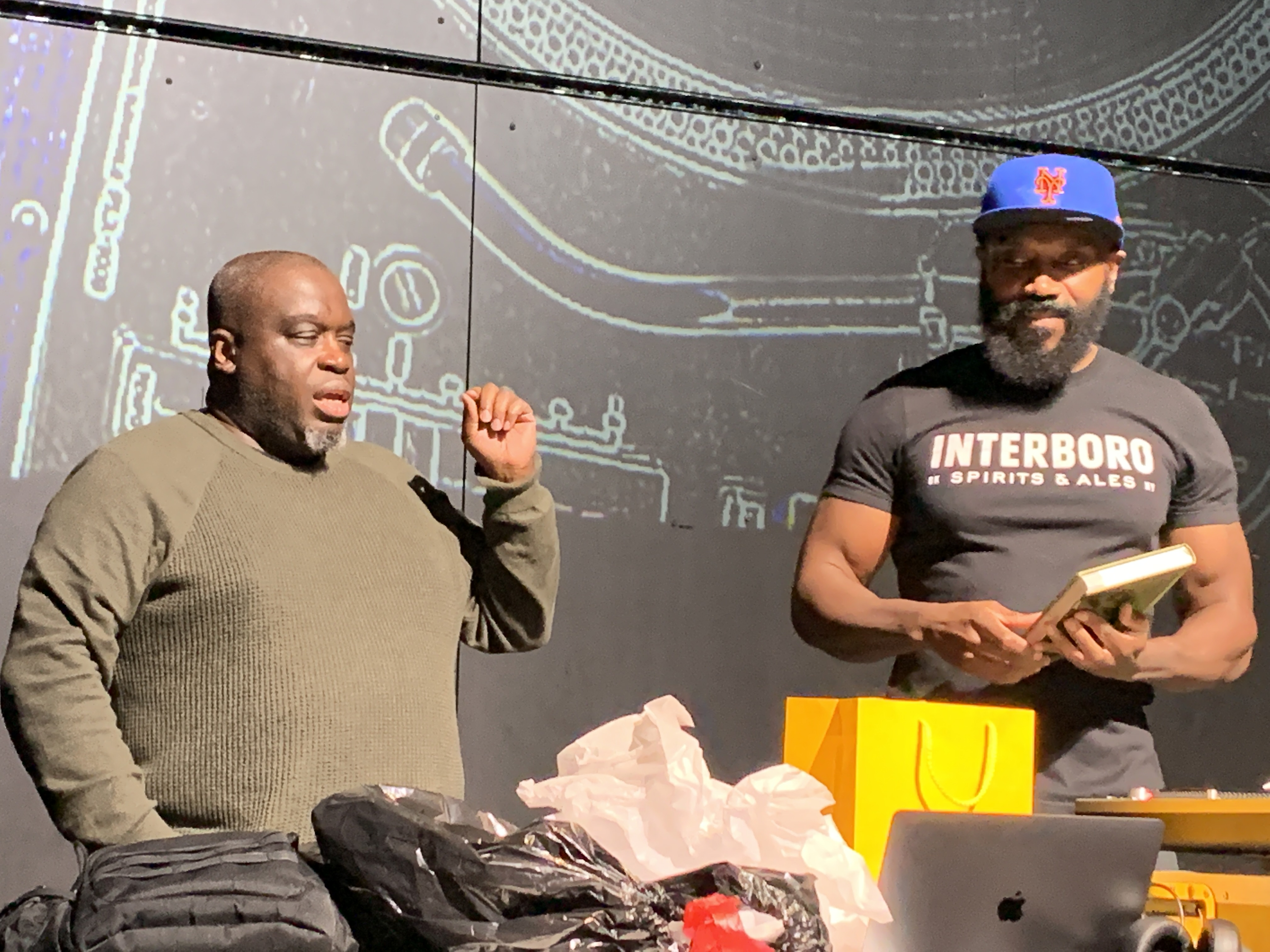
Allen and DJ Rob Swift present harbanger at MIT, January 16, 2020.

Allen's harbanger project, "a turntablist septet; an experimental, hip-hop music research project, designed to investigate turntable polyphony, polyrhythm, and polysemantics" was created in 2020 at Massachusetts Institute of Technology, during which time he was a visiting artist along with Rob Swift of The X-Ecutioners as part of MIT's Center for Art, Science & Technology (CAST) program.

On March 19, 2026, Allen delivered a public lecture to the MIT community titled "BEHOLD! The Wings of Hip-Hop Spaceflight," about his Hip-Hop Deep Space Monument (HHDSM) research project. On June 25, 2026, in honor of Black Music Month, Allen shared a version of this talk at the Harvey B. Gantt Center for African-American Arts and Culture in Charlotte, North Carolina, where he was introduced by his MIT colleague, Amy Carleton.

Event flyer from Allen's March 19, 2026 public lecture at MIT.

The HHDSM project will create a time capsule of 50-100 of hip-hop's most transcendent recordings—its masterworks. The list will be put together by artists, experts, and fans. Allen describes the tally as "the records with which — if we held on to them as the world was destroyed — we might be able to start the culture over again."

Once assembled, encoded, and ensconced, the goal is to send the records on an extrasolar trajectory across space. In his talk, Allen discussed how he got interested in this type of cultural work and what it means this current moment.
