= International Film Music Critics Association Award for Best Original Score for an Action/Adventure/Thriller Film =

International fim music award

The International Film Music Critics Association Award for Best Original Score for an Action/Adventure/Thriller Film is an annual award given by the International Film Music Critics Association, or the IFMCA. The award is given to the composer of a film score for an action, science fiction and/or horror film deemed to be the best in a given year. The award was first given in 1998, but the genres were split, with action films, adventure films and thriller films being grouped into their own categories. In 2005, action and adventure films were grouped together, while horror films were grouped with thriller films. In 2007, action and thriller films were grouped together, with adventure being excluded from the title. They reverted to dual categories the following year. It has been awarded, consecutively, since 2010.

== Winners and nominations ==
=== 1990s ===
Year	Film	Composer(s)
1998	Best Original Score for an Action Film	
1998	Small Soldiers	Jerry Goldsmith
1998	The Avengers	Joel McNeely
1998	Ronin	Elia Cmíral
1998	Rush Hour	Lalo Schifrin
1998	Soldier	Joel McNeely
1998	Best Original Score for an Adventure Film	
1998	The Mask of Zorro	James Horner
1998	The Man in the Iron Mask	Nick Glennie-Smith
1998	Mighty Joe Young	James Horner
1998	Moby Dick	Christopher Gordon
1998	Mulan	Jerry Goldsmith
1998	The Prince of Egypt	Hans Zimmer
1998	Best Original Score for a Horror/Thriller Film	
1998	Urban Legend	Christopher Young
1998	Dark City	Trevor Jones
1998	Deep Rising	Jerry Goldsmith
1998	Halloween H20: 20 Years Later	John Ottman
1998	Scream 2	Marco Beltrami
1998	The X-Files	Mark Snow

=== 2000s ===
Year	Film	Composer(s)
2004	Best Original Score for an Action/Adventure Film	
2004	The Incredibles	Michael Giacchino
2004	The Bourne Supremacy	John Powell
2004	King Arthur	Hans Zimmer
2004	Spider-Man 2	Danny Elfman
2004	Van Helsing	Alan Silvestri
2004	Best Original Score for a Horror/Thriller Film	
2004	The Village	James Newton Howard
2004	Dawn of the Dead	Tyler Bates
2004	The Final Cut	Brian Tyler
2004	The Grudge	Christopher Young
2004	The Punisher	Carlo Siliotto
2005	Best Original Score for an Action/Adventure Film	
2005	King Kong	James Newton Howard
2005	Batman Begins	Hans Zimmer and James Newton Howard
2005	Hostage	Alexandre Desplat
2005	Kingdom of Heaven	Harry Gregson-Williams
2005	Sahara	Clint Mansell
2005	Best Original Score for a Horror/Thriller Film	
2005	A History of Violence	Howard Shore
2005	Constantine	Brian Tyler and Klaus Badelt
2005	House of Wax	John Ottman
2005	The Ring Two	Hans Zimmer (themes); Henning Lohner and Martin Tillman
2005	The Skeleton Key	Edward Shearmur
2006	Best Original Score for an Action/Thriller Film	
2006	The Da Vinci Code	Hans Zimmer
2006	Casino Royale	David Arnold
2006	Firewall	Alexandre Desplat
2006	Mission: Impossible III	Michael Giacchino
2006	Pirates of the Caribbean: Dead Man's Chest	John Powell
2007	Best Original Score for an Action/Adventure Film	
2007	The Bourne Ultimatum	John Powell
2007	Ghost Rider	Christopher Young
2007	Live Free or Die Hard	Marco Beltrami
2007	Pirates of the Caribbean: At World's End	Hans Zimmer
2007	Spider-Man 3	Christopher Young
2007	Best Original Score for a Horror/Thriller Film	
2007	Zodiac	David Shire
2007	Flood	Debbie Wiseman
2007	I Know Who Killed Me	Joel McNeely
2007	The Orphanage	Fernando Velázquez
2007	Sleuth	Patrick Doyle
2008	Best Original Score for an Action/Adventure Film	
2008	Indiana Jones and the Kingdom of the Crystal Skull	John Williams
2008	The Dark Knight	Hans Zimmer and James Newton Howard
2008	Hancock	John Powell
2008	Speed Racer	Michael Giacchino
2008	Wanted	Danny Elfman
2008	Best Original Score for a Horror/Thriller Film	
2008	The Happening	James Newton Howard
2008	Let the Right One In	Johan Söderqvist
2008	Mirrors	Javier Navarrete
2008	Twilight	Carter Burwell
2008	Valkyrie	John Ottman
2009	Best Original Score for an Action/Adventure Film	
2009	The Red Canvas	James Peterson
2009	G.I. Joe: The Rise of Cobra	Alan Silvestri
2009	Lucky Luke	Bruno Coulais
2009	Sherlock Holmes	Hans Zimmer
2009	Under the Mountain	Victoria Kelly
2009	Best Original Score for a Horror/Thriller Film	
2009	Drag Me to Hell	Christopher Young
2009	Imago Mortis	Zacarías M. de la Riva
2009	In the Electric Mist	Marco Beltrami
2009	The Killing Room	Brian Tyler
2009	Trick 'r Treat	Douglas Pipes

=== 2010s ===
Year	Film	Composer(s)
2010	The Ghost Writer	Alexandre Desplat
2010	Buried	Víctor Reyes
2010	Inception	Hans Zimmer
2010	Robin Hood	Marc Streitenfeld
2010	Salt	James Newton Howard
2011	Drive	Cliff Martinez
2011	Captain America: The First Avenger	Alan Silvestri
2011	Mission: Impossible – Ghost Protocol	Michael Giacchino
2011	Real Steel	Danny Elfman
2011	Rise of the Planet of the Apes	Patrick Doyle
2012	Skyfall	Thomas Newman
2012	The Amazing Spider-Man	James Horner
2012	The Dark Knight Rises	Hans Zimmer
2012	In the House	Philippe Rombi
2012	Zero Dark Thirty	Alexandre Desplat
2013	Grand Piano	Víctor Reyes
2013	Iron Man 3	Brian Tyler
2013	Passion	Pino Donaggio
2013	Ruby Red	Philipp F. Kölmel
2013	Stalingrad	Angelo Badalamenti
2014	The Monkey King	Christopher Young
2014	The Hunger Games: Mockingjay – Part 1	James Newton Howard
2014	Inherent Vice	Jonny Greenwood
2014	The Maze Runner	John Paesano
2014	No God, No Master	Nuno Malo
2015	Mission: Impossible – Rogue Nation	Joe Kraemer
2015	Kingsman: The Secret Service	Henry Jackman and Matthew Margeson
2015	The Man from U.N.C.L.E.	Daniel Pemberton
2015	The Revenant	Ryuichi Sakamoto, Alva Noto and Bryce Dessner
2015	Tom Sawyer & Huckleberry Finn	Róbert Gulya
2016	The Monkey King 2	Christopher Young
2016	Elle	Anne Dudley
2016	The Jungle Book	John Debney
2016	The Magnificent Seven	James Horner and Simon Franglen
2016	Nerve	Rob Simonsen
2017	A Cure for Wellness	Benjamin Wallfisch
2017	Jumanji: Welcome to the Jungle	Henry Jackman
2017	King Arthur: Legend of the Sword	Daniel Pemberton
2017	Plan de Fuga	Pascal Gaigne
2017	The Rendezvous	Austin Wintory
2018	Red Sparrow	James Newton Howard
2018	King of Thieves	Benjamin Wallfisch
2018	Gun City	Manuel Riveiro and Xavier Font
2018	Mission: Impossible – Fallout	Lorne Balfe
2018	Operation Finale	Alexandre Desplat
2019	1917	Thomas Newman
2019	Dumbo	Danny Elfman
2019	The Man Who Killed Hitler and Then the Bigfoot	Joe Kraemer
2019	Masquerade Hotel	Naoki Satō
2019	The Silent War	Carlos M. Jara

=== 2020s ===
Year	Film	Composer(s)
2020	The Call of the Wild	John Powell
2020	Enola Holmes	Daniel Pemberton
2020	Mulan	Harry Gregson-Williams
2020	Tenet	Ludwig Göransson
2020	Unknown Origins	Federico Jusid
2021	Jungle Cruise	James Newton Howard
2021	Gunpowder Milkshake	Frank Ilfman
2021	The King's Man	Matthew Margeson and Dominic Lewis
2021	Last Night in Soho	Steven Price
2021	No Time to Die	Hans Zimmer
