= Marc Streitenfeld =

German composer of film scores

- Born: 1974 (age 51–52); Munich, West Germany
- Genre: Film score
- Occupation: Composer
- Website: marcstreitenfeld.com

Marc Streitenfeld (born 1974) is a German composer of film scores. He has frequently collaborated with director Ridley Scott. Streitenfeld has composed the music for many high-profile Hollywood features as well as critically acclaimed independent films, including American Gangster, Body of Lies, The Grey, Prometheus, Poltergeist and All I See Is You.

== Life and career ==
Born in Munich, Germany, Streitenfeld relocated to Los Angeles at age 19 and initially assisted film composer Hans Zimmer. Director Ridley Scott offered Streitenfeld his first composing job when he asked him to write the score for A Good Year (2006). Streitenfeld has written five film scores for Scott, including the BAFTA-nominated score for American Gangster (2007), for which he won the "Discovery of the Year" Award at the World Soundtrack Awards, the sci-fi horror Prometheus (2012) and the action adventure Robin Hood (2010). He has also been recognized for his work with three ASCAP Film and Television Music Awards and two International Film Music Critics Association award nominations. Streitenfeld has also worked with directors Marc Forster on All I See Is You (2017), Joe Carnahan on the action drama The Grey (2011), and Andrew Dominik the neo-noir crime film Killing Them Softly (2012).

Streitenfeld has recorded many of his scores at Abbey Road Studios, in London.

From 2007 to 2012, Streitenfeld was in a relationship with French actress Julie Delpy. In January 2009, the couple had a son, Leo.

== Filmography ==
=== Films ===
Year	Title	Director	Notes
2006	A Good Year	Ridley Scott	
2007	American Gangster	Ridley Scott	World Soundtrack Award for Discovery of the Year; Nominated — BAFTA Award for Best Original Music
2008	Body of Lies	Ridley Scott	
2010	Robin Hood	Ridley Scott	
2010	Welcome to the Rileys	Jake Scott	
2011	The Grey	Joe Carnahan	
2012	Prometheus	Ridley Scott	Additional music by Harry Gregson-Williams
2012	Killing Them Softly	Andrew Dominik	Credited for "piano pieces and musical ambiences"
2014	After the Fall	Saar Klein	
2015	Poltergeist	Gil Kenan	
2016	All I See Is You	Marc Forster	
2020	Six Minutes to Midnight	Andy Goddard	

=== Television ===
Year	Title	Notes
2014–2017	Hand of God	
2020-2022	Raised by Wolves	Composed with Ben Frost
