= Jake Scott (director) =

British film director (born 1965)

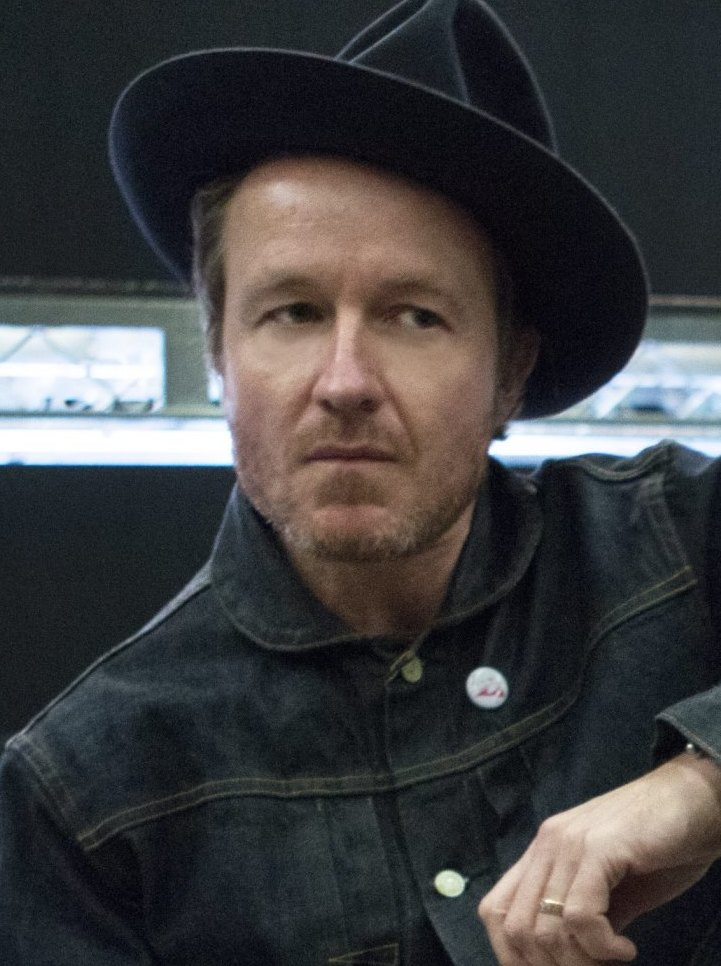
- Scott in 2025
- Born: Jason Scott; August 1965 (age 61); London, England
- Occupation: Film director
- Spouse: Leigh Goldstone (m. 2015)
- Father: Ridley Scott
- Relatives: Luke Scott (brother); Jordan Scott (paternal half-sister); Tony Scott (paternal uncle)

Jason "Jake" Scott (born August 1965) is a British film director who works primarily in the field of music videos and commercials. He is the son of film director Ridley Scott.

== Career ==
The majority of Scott's works were produced under the Ridley Scott Associates banner and RSA's music video subdivision, Black Dog Films. In 2018, he founded the Ridley Scott Creative Group.

Scott directs music videos, primarily for rock bands, including Radiohead, R.E.M., The Rolling Stones, The Smashing Pumpkins, The Strokes, and U2. He also directs commercials, such as Super Bowl commercials for Anheuser-Busch. He has directed films, including Welcome to the Rileys (2010) and American Woman (2018). For his work, he has been awarded an Emmy; he was also nominated for a Grammy, for the music video of "Everybody Hurts" by R.E.M., which earned him prominence in the industry.

In January 2014, Scott oversaw the production, with 21 editors and fifteen cinematographers, of 1.24.14, a video created by Apple Inc. to celebrate the company's 30th anniversary.

Scott is represented by the talent agencies Entertainment 360, Range Media Partners, and WME; he signed to Range in 2021.

== Personal life ==
Scott was born in August 1965, in London. He is the son of director Ridley Scott, nephew of director Tony Scott, and brother of directors Jordan Scott and Luke Scott. He is an avid mountain climber, having been taught by Tony. His mountain climbing inspired his film First Ascent, which is yet to be released.

Scott is married to film producer Rhea Scott. They have a daughter, Cuba Tornado Scott, a photographer who has collaborated with singer Lady Gaga.

== Videography ==
Year	Artist	Title
1991	Glenn Frey	"Part of Me, Part of You"
1991	Odds	"Love Is the Subject"
1992	Cypress Hill	"Stoned Is the Way of the Walk"
1992	Cypress Hill	"Real Estate"
1992	k.d. lang	"The Mind of Love"
1993	R.E.M.	"Everybody Hurts"
1993	Circus of Power	"Mama Tequila"
1994	Love Spit Love	"Am I Wrong"
1994	The Smashing Pumpkins	"Disarm"
1994	k.d. lang	"Hush Sweet Lover"
1994	Tori Amos	"Past the Mission"
1994	The Rolling Stones	"Out of Tears"
1994	Soundgarden	"Fell on Black Days"
1994	Live	"Lightning Crashes"
1995	Ned's Atomic Dustbin	"All I Ask of Myself Is That I Hold Together"
1995	Radiohead	"Fake Plastic Trees"
1995	Bush	"Comedown"
1995	Luscious Jackson	"Here"
1995	The Verve	"On Your Own"
1995	Blind Melon	"Galaxie"
1995	Dana Dane	"Chester"
1995	Natalie Merchant	"Wonder"
1995	Tina Turner	"GoldenEye"
1995	Oasis	"Morning Glory"
1995	Don Henley	"The Garden of Allah"
1996	Spacehog	"In the Meantime"
1996	Tracy Bonham	"Mother Mother"
1996	Soundgarden	"Burden in My Hand"
1996	The Cranberries	"When You're Gone"
1996	Eels	"Susan's House"
1997	U2	"Staring at the Sun"
1997	Live	"Turn My Head"
1999	Unkle	"Be There"
1999	No Doubt	"New"
1999	Sash!	"Colour the World"
2001	Goldfrapp	"Human"
2001	Tricky	"Evolution Revolution Love"
2001	Artists Against AIDS Worldwide	"What's Going On"
2004	P!nk	"God Is a DJ"
2004	The Strokes	"Reptilia"
2004	George Michael	"Flawless (Go to the City)"
2009	Lily Allen	"22"
2011	Massive Attack	"Pray for Rain"

== Filmography ==
- Plunkett & Macleane (1999)
- Tooth Fairy (2004) (Short film)
- Welcome to the Rileys (2010)
- American Woman (2018)
- Kipchoge: The Last Milestone (2021) (documentary film)
