= Welcome to the Rileys =

- Theatrical release poster
- Directed by: Jake Scott
- Written by: Ken Hixon
- Produced by: Scott Bloom; Giovanni Agnelli; Michael Costigan
- Starring: James Gandolfini; Kristen Stewart; Melissa Leo
- Cinematography: Christopher Soos
- Edited by: Nicolas Gaster
- Music by: Marc Streitenfeld
- Production companies: Scott Free Productions; Argonaut Pictures
- Distributed by: Samuel Goldwyn Films; Destination Films
- Release dates: January 23, 2010 (Sundance); October 29, 2010 (United States)
- Running time: 110 minutes
- Countries: United Kingdom; United States
- Language: English
- Budget: $10 million
- Box office: $317,382

Welcome to the Rileys is a 2010 independent drama film directed by Jake Scott, written by Ken Hixon, and starring Kristen Stewart, James Gandolfini and Melissa Leo. The film debuted at the 2010 Sundance Film Festival.

== Plot ==
Ever since the death of their teenage daughter Emily, Doug and Lois Riley have been drifting apart. Because of her grief, Lois has become a cold and distant agoraphobic. Doug begins an affair with Vivian, a younger local waitress.

One morning, Doug is informed that Vivian has died, and he travels to New Orleans on a business trip to clear his head. Instead, he ends up in a strip club where he meets 16-year-old stripper, Mallory. He politely turns down her offer for a private dance, and — in order to avoid some colleagues who entered the club — instead accompanies her home and makes an unusual proposition: if Mallory will allow him to stay in her run-down house long enough to straighten himself out, he will pay her $100 a day for her trouble. She accepts, and Doug phones Lois to tell her he will not be coming home for a while. She tells him that she knew about his affair with Vivian, but before the conversation can go any further, she hangs up.

As time passes, Doug and Mallory settle into an unconventional kind of domesticity, and he becomes more of a father figure for her than anything else, including teaching her how to make a bed properly and taking care of her money. Meanwhile, back home, Lois realizes she will have to act fast to save her marriage, even if that means venturing outside for the first time in nearly a decade. After a couple of attempts, she gets in her car and heads south.

One night, Doug gets a call from Mallory, who is in trouble after being robbed by a client. He goes to pick her up and makes her realise that she needs to make some changes before things get worse. The following morning, Lois arrives in town and calls Doug to let him know; he is stunned. He immediately goes to meet her and they embrace one another for the first time in years. On the drive back, he tells her about Mallory (whose real name is Alison) and what she does for a living. Lois instantly disapproves and is shocked to learn how young and foul-mouthed Mallory is. However, like Doug, Lois quickly warms to her due to her striking similarities to Emily.

Before long, Lois has also moved into Mallory's home, and the three start to form an unconventional family. Lois helps her out with female problems and takes her shopping to buy suitable underwear, making her feel like a mother again, which she enjoys dearly. Later on, when Lois attempts to steer Mallory from the path of self-destruction, the young girl flees. Mallory is then later arrested for an altercation with a client, and Doug and Lois rush to be by her side, but shortly after they bail her out, she runs away again. At that moment, Doug and Lois realize they cannot use Mallory as a substitute for their daughter and return home to Indianapolis.

A few days later, Doug receives a phone call from Mallory in Houston. She looks cleaned up and healthier and announces her plans about moving to Las Vegas, just before boarding the bus. Doug tells her that he and Lois will always be there for her.

== Cast ==
- James Gandolfini as Doug Riley, a lonely man who decides to help Mallory.
- Kristen Stewart as Allison/Mallory, a troubled teenage girl and stripper.
- Melissa Leo as Lois Riley, Doug's wife.
- Eisa Davis as Vivian
- David Jensen as Ed
- Kathy Lamkin as Charlene
- Joe Chrest as Jerry
- Ally Sheedy as Harriet, Lois' sister.

== Production ==
The filming took place in New Orleans in October 2008.

== Box office ==
The film had a limited release and grossed $158,898 at the United States box office and $158,484 internationally with a worldwide total of $317,382.

== Reception ==
The film screened at the 2010 Sundance Film Festival and received mixed reviews. It has a 54% approval rating on Rotten Tomatoes based on 84 reviews, with an average rating of 5.60/10. The site's consensus reads: "Despite earnest performances, Welcome to the Rileys cannot escape its belabored over-sentimentality and sluggish delivery". On Metacritic it has a score of 50% based on reviews from 30 critics, indicating "mixed or average reviews".

While some critics criticized the direction, script, as well as performances, film critic Roger Ebert stated, "One of the buzz champs of Sundance 2010. Gandolfini demonstrates that although he may not be conventionally handsome, when he smiles his face bathes you in the urge to like him. Kristen Stewart here is tougher even than her punk rocker in The Runaways." Roger Friedman of The Hollywood Reporter said, "We got to see James Gandolfini continue his whacking of Tony Soprano in a fine new drama called Welcome to the Rileys. Gandolfini and Melissa Leo turn in superb performances as a couple who've lost their 15-year-old daughter. Kristen Stewart, she of Twilight fame, is also very good as a teen prostitute whom the couple befriends. The film is directed by Jake Scott, son of Ridley, nephew of Tony, and he shows that he's inherited the family gene."

Anthony Breznican of USA Today also noted that "Kristen Stewart's shocking depiction of a self-destructive 16-year-old stripper/prostitute in Welcome to the Rileys is bound to scandalize. Those who prefer her only as Twilight's lovestruck Bella may be shocked, while others who know her more nuanced work in films such as Adventureland will see a fearless new side of the actress confirmed." However, David Edwards from the Daily Mirror says, "It's downbeat and has little to say about the grieving process, and while Gandolfini and Leo are memorable, Stewart is not."

Scott received a Grand Jury Prize nomination for Most Dramatic Film at the Sundance Film Festival, after Welcome to the Rileys screened there. Leo won best actress at Boston Film critics, Gandolfini was nominated as best actor, and Stewart won best actress at Milan International Film Festival.
