= Ink (2009 film) =

- Film poster
- Directed by: Jamin Winans
- Written by: Jamin Winans
- Produced by: Jamin Winans; Kiowa K. Winans; Laura Wright
- Starring: Chris Kelly; Quinn Hunchar; Jessica Duffy
- Cinematography: Jeff Pointer
- Edited by: Jamin Winans
- Music by: Jamin Winans
- Production company: Double Edge Films
- Distributed by: Double Edge Films
- Release dates: January 23, 2009 (SBIFF); November 10, 2009 (DVD)
- Running time: 106 minutes
- Country: United States
- Language: English
- Budget: $250,000

Ink is a 2009 American science fantasy film written and directed by Jamin Winans, starring Chris Kelly, Quinn Hunchar and Jessica Duffy. It was produced by Winans's own independent production company, Double Edge Films, with Kiowa K. Winans, and shot by cinematographer Jeff Pointer in locations around Denver, Colorado. The film premiered at the Santa Barbara International Film Festival on January 23, 2009, and has screened in Denver, the Cancun Film Festival (where it won the Best International Feature award), Rams Head Onstage in Baltimore and in a number of independent movie houses in cities around the US. The film was widely circulated in peer-to-peer networks, which led to its commercial success on DVD and Blu-ray.

== Plot ==
The film begins with a businessman, John Sullivan (Chris Kelly), in a hurry to get into his car. He appears to be severely stressed as he begins driving down the city streets. When he goes through a lighted intersection he is broadsided by another driver that is distracted by hot coffee in his lap. As he falls unconscious, he dreams of playing with his young daughter, Emma (Quinn Hunchar). Emma pretends to be kidnapped and tells John to "save" her from the "monster", although John seems exasperated and tells her to have her mother do it instead. Eventually, however, John gives in and runs to "save" his daughter, while Emma laughs and embraces him.

It is revealed that dreams are controlled by beings from an alternate plane of reality. The beings are spirits of deceased people from Earth and are divided into distinct groups: Storytellers (bearers of good dreams), Incubi (cause of nightmares), and Drifters (those in a state of limbo who cause neither good nor bad dreams). As the Storytellers and Incubi perform their daily work in the night, a Drifter known as Ink goes to Emma's room and removes her soul from her body. Although a number of Storytellers try to prevent the action, Ink escapes with the girl's soul into the dreamworld, leaving Emma's body unconscious. However, in the dreamworld, Ink is unable to open a portal to the Incubi's headquarters, where he intends to take Emma's soul. He is told that he must find and barter with two other Drifters to acquire parts of a code that will enable him to achieve entry into the headquarters.

Meanwhile, John, whose life has attained a sense of repetition and perfection, faces turmoil when an account he has been working to acquire is about to be swept out from under him. Soon after, Ron Evans (Steve Sealy), John's estranged father-in-law, comes to inform John that Emma is in a coma and has been placed in a hospital. Although Ron begs John to go and see the girl, John refuses and berates Ron, saying that the father-in-law turned the world against him. Shortly after, Ron is ordered out of John's office. It is revealed that Ron and his wife were given custody of Emma after the death of John's wife Shelly (Shannan Steele) in a car accident, due to John's grief-induced addiction to alcohol and drugs.

At the same time in the dreamworld, the Storytellers Allel, Gabe, and Sarah (played by Jennifer Batter, Eme Ikwuakor, and Shelby Malone, respectively) work to find a way to awaken Emma. In order to do this, they receive the help of Jacob (Jeremy Make), an eccentric blind spirit known as a "Pathfinder". Meanwhile, a Storyteller named Liev (Jessica Duffy) confronts Ink and attempts to discourage him from delivering Emma to the Incubi. After Ink threatens to murder Emma if Liev continues to pursue him, Liev surrenders to Ink as a prisoner. It is revealed that Ink is taking Emma's soul to the Incubi in order to become one of them and cease to be a Drifter. Soon after, Ink successfully barters with two Drifters for parts of the code. As Ink's prisoner, Liev tries to bolster Emma's bravery in order to thwart Ink.

During this time, the Pathfinder Jacob unveils his abilities to the Storytellers: tapping into the "beat of the world" in order to cause physical changes that affect the course of time. Through a chain of events, Jacob causes several small accidents that culminate in a truck running a red light and crashing into John's car, revisiting an opening scene of the film. Due to his injuries, John is taken to a hospital, which turns out to be the same hospital where Emma is checked in. After recalling his happiness before his wife died, John walks to Emma's room, guarded by Allel as an unseen battle ensues between the Storytellers and Incubi.

In the dreamworld, Liev discovers that Ink arrived after his human counterpart committed suicide. Ink, being ashamed of his hideous and scarred appearance, believes the Incubi will help him, the Incubi having been revealed to all wear apparati that project facades of bliss and happiness to hide their misery. After making their way to the stronghold of the Incubi, Ink offers Emma and Liev as his payment to the leader. As Liev attempts to stand up to the leader of the Incubi, she is mortally wounded. While dying, Liev pleads with Ink to "remember". Suddenly, Ink has a revelation: he recalls that Emma died in the hospital without her father's presence; and John, driven to further depression and regret, shot himself in despair, at which time his soul entered the dreamworld and became the Drifter known as Ink. Ink understands that he is, in fact, John Sullivan's soul from a future in which Emma dies and he does not visit her at the hospital due to time flowing differently in the dreamworld. In this realization, Ink rushes at the Incubi and kills them to rescue his daughter, mirroring the dream scene in the beginning of the film. After the fight is over, Emma's soul embraces Ink, realizing that it is her father. In the normal world, Pathfinder Jacob activates a device that calls the other Storytellers as reinforcement, with the onslaught of Storytellers defeating the Incubi. John finally makes his way to Emma's room. The film closes as Emma awakes to find her father at her bedside.

== Cast ==
- Christopher Soren Kelly as John Sullivan
- Quinn Hunchar as Emma
- Jessica Duffy as Liev
- Jennifer Batter as Allel
- Jeremy Make as Jacob
- Shannan Steele as Shelly Sullivan
- Eme Ikwuakor as Gabe
- Shelby Malone as Sarah
- Steve Sealy as Ron Evans
- Kathy Cagney as Kathy Evans
- Marty Lindsey as The Key Master Incubus
- Shauna Earp as "Sadie" The Bride

== Production and distribution ==
Both Jamin Winans and Kiowa Winans contributed multiple roles in making Ink, in addition to being credited as executive producers. Jamin wrote, directed and edited, as well as composed the original soundtrack for the film, while Kiowa is credited for the Art Direction, Costume Design and Sound Design. As no big studio picked up the film for theatrical and home distribution, Double Edge Films pitched the film directly to independent cinemas and saw to the DVD, Blu-ray and online distribution themselves. DVD and Blu-ray copies are sold directly via the company's website starting from October 30, 2009 and are sold at retail stores starting November 10, 2009, as well as downloads at video on demand stores. The film was frequently pirated online at the time, and Jamin and Kiowa Winans wrote in their newsletter that they had "embraced the piracy" as it led to a larger audience and they were "happy Ink is getting unprecedented exposure." Around Christmas 2009 the film was also released on Hulu for free viewing for a limited time.

== Reception ==
The film received generally positive reviews. Film critics often noted the technical quality of the film even as an amateur, low-budget film. Robert Abele of the Los Angeles Times said "there's a rapacious DIY showmanship at work here reminiscent of the calling-card chutzpah Robert Rodriguez and Peter Jackson showed in scrappier, pre-blockbuster days." Luke Y. Thompson of LA Weekly ranked the film positively and remarked, "Ink has all the ambition of a Terry Gilliam or Jean-Pierre Jeunet epic, but since none of the studios bit, the writer-director decided to make it himself with next-to-no money, a bold gambit a viewer can respect even while wishing the final project were remotely as grandiose as the auteur's aspirations." Lisa Kennedy of the Denver Post also offered the film a positive review. The film holds a critical score of 100% on the movie review aggregator Rotten Tomatoes, based on 6 reviews, with an average rating of 7.6 out of 10. Due to good word of mouth among audiences, the film was frequently viewed many times upon its release. According to TorrentFreak, a file sharing news site, Ink was downloaded via BitTorrent 400,000 times in a single week, which exposed the film to a large audience and led to higher DVD and Blu-ray sales in return.
