= Cultural legacy of the Klondike Gold Rush =

The Klondike Gold Rush is commemorated through film, literature, historical parks etc.

== Heritage properties ==
The Tr’ondëk-Klondike World Heritage Site, a UNESCO World Heritage Site in Canada, protects a series of eight properties that attest to the effects of the rapid colonization of the area, including the Gold Rush, on the Tr’ondëk Hwëch’in people. The World Heritage Site was designated in 2023.

== Literature ==
=== Fiction ===
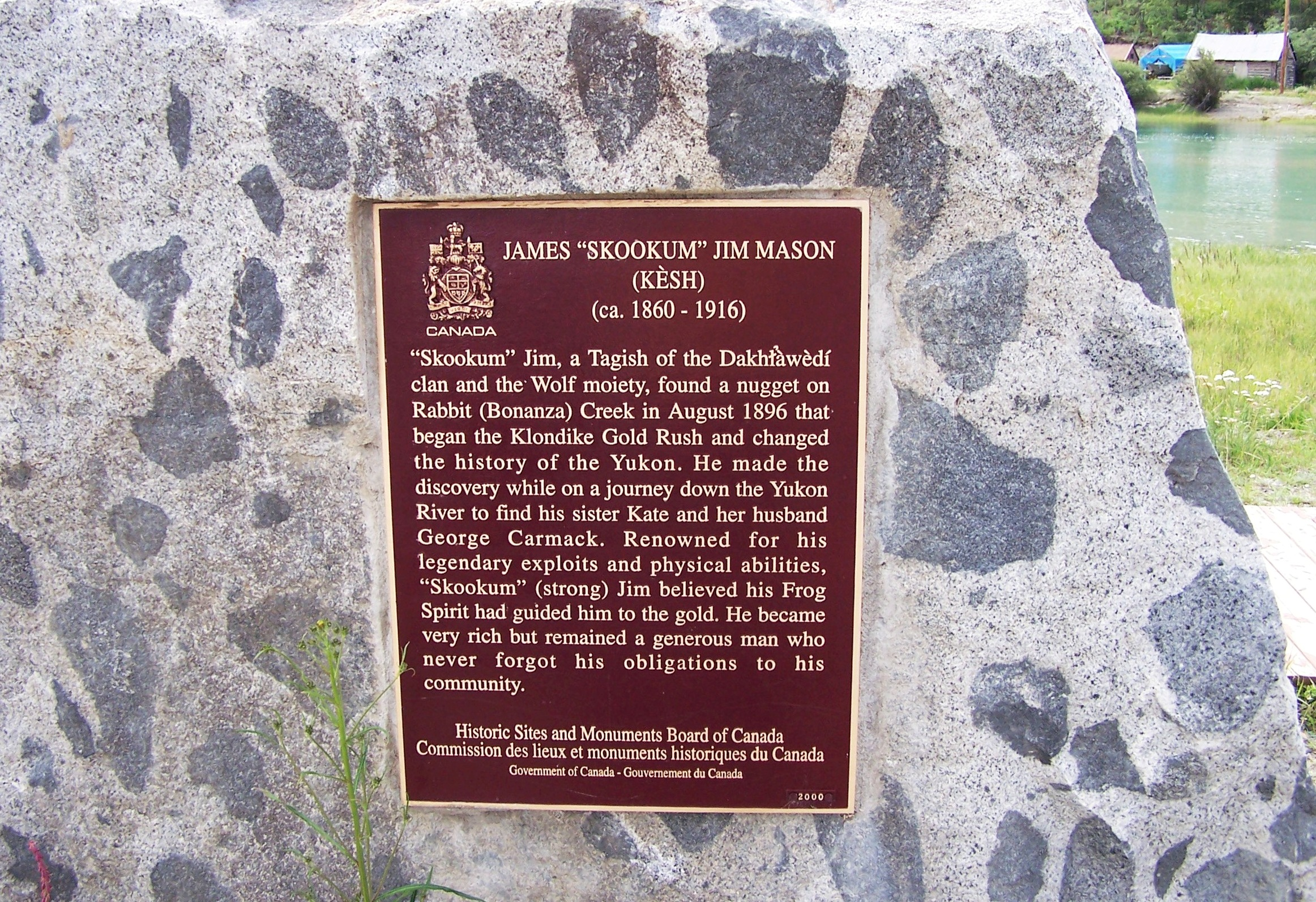
Plaque to Skookum Jim Mason

Among the many writers taking part in the Gold Rush was writer Jack London, whose books The Call of the Wild (1903), White Fang (1906), and his short story "To Build a Fire" (1902 and 1908), were influenced by his northern experiences. London was inspired to write stories by various adventurers he met. The Thousand Dozen, for instance, was inspired by a brief market corner on eggs created by Swiftwater Bill. Part I of Jack London's 1910 novel Burning Daylight is centered on the Klondike Gold Rush.

Another literary luminary connected with the rush, and whose cabin still stands in Dawson City, was folk-lyricist Robert W. Service, whose short epics The Shooting of Dan McGrew (1907) and other works describe the fierce grandeur of the north and the survival ethic and gold fever of men and women in the frozen, gold-strewn north. Service's best-known lines are from the opening of The Cremation of Sam McGee (1907), which goes:

There are strange things done in the midnight sun
By the men who moil for gold;
The Arctic trails have their secret tales
That would make your blood run cold;

One of the last books of Jules Verne, Le Volcan d'Or (The Volcano of Gold), deals with the terrible hardships endured by the gold-seekers in the Klondike. The Klondike became a popular setting for adventure stories and travel memoirs in North American and European markets.

James A. Michener's 1988 novel Alaska (chapter VIII) and his short novel Journey describe the harsh realities of the Klondike Gold Rush using fictional characters.

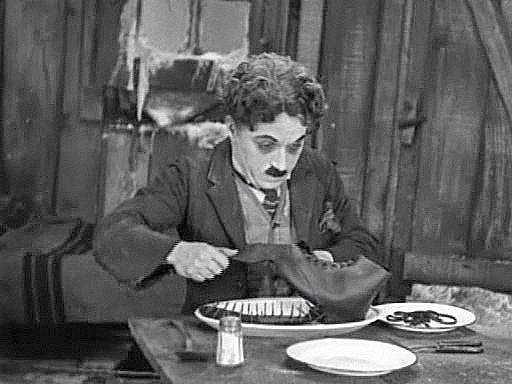
Charlie Chaplin carving up a boot in The Gold Rush

The 1997 book "Jason's Gold" by Will Hobbs (not published until 1999) was about a boy who went to Klondike in search for gold and his experience there.

Canadian author Vicki Delany writes the Klondike Gold Rush series of mystery novels from Dundurn Press, which include Gold Digger (2009) and Gold Fever (2010) and Gold Mountain (May 2012).

=== Non-fiction ===
The Gold Rush of the Klondike and Alaska created a sub-genre of non-fiction that explores the depths of historical and cultural aspects of the Gold Rush. The publication of Klondike: The Last Great Goldrush (1958) by Canadian journalist and author Pierre Berton began this trend. Klondike was the first comprehensive account of the Klondike gold rush and quickly became a bestseller. Other influential books include:

The Klondike Gold Rush (2013) By Graham B. Wilson. Collects 125 archive pictures illustrating the journey north and the struggle of toiling in the gold fields.

Soapy Smith: Skagway's Scourge of the Klondike (2005) By Stan Sauerwein. A story of the American North's greatest conman and huckster. Soapy Smith 'mined the miners' through swindles and fraud until he was killed in a gunfight in the streets of Skagway.

Women of the Klondike (1996) By Frances Backhouse. The book highlights the roles of women, who played a critical role during the Gold Rush. Backhouse delves into the lives of women -- entrepreneurs, nuns, doctors, nurses, journalists, and dancehall entertainers among them.

Gold at Fortymile Creek (1995) By Michael Gates follows the accounts of the first gold-seekers in Alaska and the Yukon from their arrival in 1873 until the stampede to the Klondike in 1896. Gates captures the essence of this aspect of history, about which little has been written.

The Klondike Stampede (original edition 1900) By Tappan Adney. Perhaps the best first-person account of the Klondike Gold Rush. Adney was a journalist for Harper's Weekly sent by the magazine to chronicle the event. In 1897, he took a steamship to Skagway, then traveled into Canada over Chilkoot Pass, to Dawson, and on to the Klondike River.

Music of the Alaska-Klondike Gold Rush: Songs and History (1999) By Jean Murray. A comprehensive collection of lyrics, score, chords and background information on songs and parodies by professional musicians and gold seekers for the entire Klondike era. Includes about 100 songs from the Gold Rush era, which are now in the public domain.

Good Time Girls: Of the Alaska-Yukon Gold Rush (1998) By Lael Morgan. Alaskan journalist Lael Morgan chronicles the stories of the prostitutes and "disreputable" women in the entertainment and sex industries who were the earliest female pioneers of the Far North.

Bo at Ballard Creek (2013) By Kirkpatrick Hill, LeUyen Pham (illustrator). Taking place in the 1920s, the book centers on Bo, an orphaned girl who is raised by two male gold miners after the gold rush.

Hollywood on the Klondike: Dawson City's Great Film Find (2023) By Michael Gates. The book documents the history behind a hoard of silent films found buried beneath the permafrost of Dawson City. Gates gives insight into Klondike's role in the making of the West Coast vaudeville circuit and the creation of Hollywood itself.

== Film and television ==
Charlie Chaplin's silent film The Gold Rush (1925), the highest-grossing silent comedy, was set in the Klondike. Also about the gold rush were Lev Kuleshov's silent-era adaptation of Jack London's "The Unexpected" By the Law (1926), the silent epic The Trail of '98 (1928), and Mae West's Klondike Annie (1936).

A number of animated cartoons satirized the Klondike Gold Rush, including:

- The Klondike Kid (Walt Disney, 1932), starring Mickey Mouse
- Dangerous Dan McFoo (Warner Bros., 1939)
- The Shooting of Dan McGoo (MGM, 1945), starring Droopy
- Klondike Casanova (Famous Studios, 1946), starring Popeye the Sailor
- Bonanza Bunny (Warner Bros., 1959)
- "14 Carrot Rabbit" (Warner Bros, 1952), starring Bugs Bunny and Yosemite Sam

The 1946 comedy Road to Utopia, directed by Hal Walker and starring Bing Crosby, Bob Hope, and Dorothy Lamour, is set during the rush.

Life in Dawson City during the gold rush was the subject of the 1957 National Film Board of Canada (NFB) documentary City of Gold, directed by Colin Low (filmmaker) and Wolf Koenig and narrated by Pierre Berton. The documentary won the Palme d'Or at the Cannes Film Festival for best short film and received an Academy Award nomination for Best Short Subject, Live Action Subjects.

The 1955 film The Far Country is a Western set in Skagway and Dawson City during the gold rush era. It was directed by Anthony Mann and stars James Stewart, Ruth Roman, Corinne Calvet, and Walter Brennan.

The gold rush was the subject of the NBC series Klondike, which aired from 1960–1961. It starred Ralph Taeger and James Coburn and episodes were directed by William Conrad, Elliott Lewis, and Sam Peckinpah.

The 1978 TV special What a Nightmare, Charlie Brown! is set during the Gold Rush, but is disputed to be the 1925 serum run to Nome.

The 1980 film Klondike Fever depicts Jack London during the gold rush and stars Jeff East as London alongside Rod Steiger as Soapy Smith, Lorne Greene as Sam Steele, and Gordon Pinsent as Swiftwater Bill.

The 2012 episode "Murdoch of the Klondike" of the series Murdoch Mysteries is set during the gold rush and guest stars Aaron Ashmore as Jack London and Matt Cooke as Sam Steele.

The 2014 Discovery Channel miniseries Klondike stars Richard Madden as Bill Haskell, a real-life adventurer who travels to Yukon, Canada, in the late 1890s, during the gold rush. Directed by Simon Cellan Jones, it also features Abbie Cornish as Belinda Mulrooney, Sam Shepard as William Judge, Marton Csokas as Sam Steele, Ian Hart as Soapy Smith, Johnny Simmons as Jack London, and Colin Cunningham as Swiftwater Bill.

The TG4 series An Klondike (Dominion Creek in the United States) aired for two seasons from 2015–2017 and stars Owen McDonnell, Dara Devaney, and Seán T. Ó Meallaigh as three fictional Irish brothers who become involved in the gold rush. Set in the fictional town of Dominion Creek, Skookum Jim (portrayed by Julian Black Antelope), Belinda Mulrooney (portrayed by Bríd Ní Neachtain), Soapy Smith (portrayed by Michael Glenn Murphy), Sam Steele (portrayed by Steve Wall), and William Judge (portrayed by Clive Geraghty), also appear in the series.

== Music and theater ==
Theatre entertainment in Dawson and later Nome was an extension of theater on the West Coast, especially San Francisco and Victoria. Promoters brought a seemingly endless supply of singers and dancers North, some of whose names became part of the gold rush vocabulary. Diamond Tooth Gertie, Diamond Lil, Oregon Mare, Nellie the Pig.

Sopranos, the rarest and most valuable of female singers, pretended to have links to the French opera: Nellie La Marr, Blanche La Mont, Minnie La Tour, and Gussi LaMore were common names.

National performers like Ida Rossiter, Florence Brocee, Anna Kane, Beatrice Lorne graced the North, joined even by the Black Hills' Calamity Jane, who tried to make a comeback in the Klondike.

The northern gold rush inspired a whole group of songs by composers across the country. Tunes in ragtime and Gay Nineties style, appeared within days after news of the Klondike gold strike arrived in American and Canadian cities.[3]

A number of songs written about the northern gold rush became national best sellers as the first disc records began to be used with phonographs, or gramophones around the mid-1890s.

The Klondyke march and two step. (Music Emporium, Kingston, Ontario, 1897) Music by Oscar Telgmann.

"He's Sleeping in the Klondike Vale Tonight" (Howley, Haviland & Co. 1897) Words and music by M.J. Fitzpatrick

"The Klondike: March of the Miners" (Willis Woodward & Co. 1897) Words and music by Theodore Metz.

"In Klondyke's Field of Gold" (W.A. Pond & Co. 1897) Words and music by A. S. Eldridge.

"Rory, Bory, Alice" (M. Witmark & Sons 1898) Words by George Bowles. Music by William Potter Brown.

"Klondike Rag" (William R. Haskins Co. 1908) Words and music by George Botsford.

"In the Far-Off Alaska Clime" (1898) Words and music by Robert E. Lee Yokum.

"On the Banks of the Yukon Far Away" (F. B. Haviland 1910) Words and Music by Martin T. Chester.

The 1907 Comic Opera The Alaskan, which included the song "Bah, Bah Black Sheep", written by Seattle Times Managing Editor Joseph Blethen, with music by leading man Harry Girard.

The discovery of gold on the beaches in Nome in the fall of 1898, more than 1,000 miles downriver from Dawson ended the Klondike "rush" for good, although gold production increased in the region until 1903 as dredging and hydraulic mining replaced panning and hand-digging. Fully 8,000 Dawson City residents decamped to Nome over the winter of 1899-1900.

The expansion of demand for live talent shows during the Gold Rush led to a permanent change to North America's entertainment landscape. New vaudeville circuits prospered as entrepreneurs began building grandiose theaters with striking Gilded Age, neo-classical architecture in many Western cities, in particular, the Pantages theater chain.

Two of the most significant vaudeville impresarios in the early 20th century – Alexander Pantages and John Considine – had their start in the northern gold rush.

Pantages, a Greek immigrant boxer and waiter, left San Francisco in 1897 to the Klondike where he opened his first Orpheum Theater to entertain the miners and soon was taking in over $3,000 (~$97,021 in 2024) a night for "wine and other 'concoctions" while becoming the partner and lover of "Klondike Kate" Rockwell. Pantages returned to Seattle to become one of America's greatest theater and movie tycoons, beginning a competition with fellow Seattle-based Constantine, who reportedly spent some time in Nome. Their competition included such clandestine methods as stealing acts from each other and committing various forms of sabotage. This competition lasted for several decades and was one of the defining features of the vaudeville circuit of the time.

The song "Gold Dust" by Canadian independent artist Right On Yukon makes multiple references to the hardships endured by fortune seekers and animals along the White Pass trail from Skagway to Dawson.

== Popular culture ==
Carl Barks' 1950s Scrooge McDuck comics established the character as a successful participant in the Klondike rush when he was young, around the turn of the century. While Barks was content with leaving Scrooge's backstory of his Klondike days at the level of short flashbacks, his successor Don Rosa has gone to extend Barks's legacy of short glimpses into Scrooge's gold rush exploits into a number of adventure stories, particularly Last Sled to Dawson and individual chapters of his opus magnum The Life and Times of Scrooge McDuck, which are chapter 8a: King of the Klondike, chapter 8b: The Prisoner of White Agony Creek, and chapter 8c: Hearts of the Yukon.

Soapy Smith is the villain in the Lucky Luke album Le Klondike, by Morris, Yann and Jean Léturgie. The story features Smith's saloon and fake telegraph, but set in Dawson rather than Skagway.

Lefty Frizzell's 1964 song "Saginaw, Michigan" tells the tale of a poor fisherman who feigns the discovery of Klondike gold in a plot to remove the hostile father of the woman he loves.

A game called The Yukon Trail was created by MECC in 1994. There is also a populaire solitaire called Klondike.

In addition, the Klondike gold rush proved to be one of the most famous eras of the Royal Canadian Mounted Police's history. Not only did the exemplary conduct of the force ensure its continuation at a time when its dissolution was being debated in the Parliament of Canada, but the Force's depiction in popular western culture is often set at this time. The most popular examples include dramatic depictions such as the radio series Challenge of the Yukon and comedic ones like Dudley Do-Right.

A certain amount of slang came out of the gold rush. Experienced miners were often known as "Sourdoughs". Potential miners new to the Klondike were known as "Cheechakos", from Chinook Jargon. These two names live on in Dawson City, in tourist literature, and enjoy occasional usage by miners still working the tributaries of the Yukon River and Klondike River as well as in literature relating to the Klondike gold rush era.

== Celebrations ==
The gold rush was celebrated in the city of Edmonton, Alberta, with Klondike Days (now simply K-Days), an annual summer fair with a Klondike gold rush theme. Although far away from Dawson City and the Klondike River, Edmonton became known as a "Gateway to the North" for gold prospectors en route to Canada's North. It was in the city that many would collect the necessary goods for trekking up north in search of wealth. Individuals and teams of explorers arrived in Edmonton and prepared for travel by foot, York boat, dog team, or horses. Travel to the Yukon over land via what was sometimes called the "all Canada" route—and the prospectors that took this route—were often referred to as "overlanders". Few overlanders made it to the Klondike (160 out of about 1,600 that started).

Alberta's Northlands Association, which is based in Edmonton, honoured the memory and spirit of the overlanders with Klondike Days. For many years, Klondike Days was a fun summer exhibition with themed events such as the Sunday Promenade, the Sourdough raft race, free pancake breakfasts, saloons, gold panning and era costume parties. Despite the many sad realities of the gold rush, Edmonton appreciated the Klondike spirit, which was characterised by a tenacious hope for success in the face of hardship, and an energetic zest for life. As a fair theme it was meant to provide the impetus for fun fantasy characters (e.g., Klondike Mike (Bobby Breen), Klondike Kate, The Klondike Kid (Ken Armstrong), Klondike Kitty (Debra Cook), Klondike Kattie to mention but a few) and fun events celebrating an interesting time. Many in the Yukon resented Edmonton's Klondike celebrations because of their historical inaccuracy and the perceived competition with the Yukon's tourism. The sentimental aspect of the gold rush lost its popular appeal in the 1980s and 90s and in 2003 the theme was dropped.

In addition, every other summer, on odd numbered years, the sleep away camp Camp Shohola for Boys has what it calls Klondike Day. In the morning an area of camp, including the creek that runs through the camp, are staged as Dawson City and campers run into the creek to search for "gold." In the afternoon they receive "money" for their prospecting and attend a camp wide carnival.

In 2016, a BBC History TV series 'Operation Gold Rush' was co-hosted by explorer Felicity Aston, retracing the route across the Yukon of the 1898 Klondyke Gold Rush. In 2019, as a way to celebrate the original Klondike Gold Rush, the Yukon government crowdsourced a second Gold Rush by inviting the public to buy perks via Indiegogo. Using the money raised, the government bought real Klondike gold and sprinkled it into the Territory's creeks. People were invited to recover the gold as a re-creation of the original Klondike Gold Rush.

== See also ==
- An Klondike
- The Chechahcos, 1924 film
- Klondike, miniseries
