= List of Scott Free productions =

This is a list of films, television series and animations produced by independent and privately run production company Scott Free Productions, currently headquartered in London and Los Angeles. Established in 1970 by brothers-filmmakers, Ridley and Tony Scott, currently run by David W. Zucker as CCO, Kevin J. Walsh as president, Michael Schaefer as producer and president, Mike Pruss as senior VP, Jack Arbuthnott as head of film, Kate Crowe as head of television and Carlo Dusi as head of business, owned by Ridley's larger company RSA Films. The company was formerly known as Scott Free Enterprises (1970–1980), Percy Main Productions (1980–1995; naming after the English village Percy Main, where their father grew up), Tony Scott Productions (1980–1995) and Ridley Scott Productions (1980–1995). The company has produced films ranging from the 2000 Hollywood blockbuster Gladiator (2000) to "smaller pictures" like Cracks (2009). Between productions of White Squall (1996) and G.I. Jane (1997), the company was reorganised by Ridley. In 2005, Numbers became the company's first hit series for television. The strategy repeated in 2009 when the company produced its second hit series The Good Wife. In 2012, Tony, who was one of the co-founders of the company, died.

== Film ==
Year	Title	Director	Notes
1970	Loving Memory	Tony Scott	as Scott Free Enterprises
1971	The Great Escape	Barry Tomblin	as Scott Free Enterprises
1976	Owen Wingrave	Paul Seban	as Scott Free Enterprises
1976	L'Auteur de Beltraffio	Tony Scott	as Scott Free Enterprises
1977	The Duellists	Ridley Scott	as Scott Free Enterprises
1991	Thelma & Louise	Ridley Scott	as Percy Main Productions
1992	1492: Conquest of Paradise''	Ridley Scott	as Percy Main Productions
1994	The Browning Version	Mike Figgis	as Percy Main Productions
1994	Monkey Trouble	Franco Amurri	as Percy Main Productions
1996	White Squall	Ridley Scott	
1996	The Fan	Tony Scott	
1997	G.I. Jane	Ridley Scott	
1998	Clay Pigeons	David Dobkin	
1998	Enemy of the State	Tony Scott	(produced in association with)
1999	RKO 281	Benjamin Ross	TV movie
2000	Where the Money Is	Marek Kanievska	
2000	The Last Debate	John Badham	TV movie
2000	Gladiator	Ridley Scott	(produced in association with)
2001	Hannibal	Ridley Scott	
2001	Black Hawk Down	Ridley Scott	(produced in association with)
2002	The Gathering Storm	Richard Loncraine	TV movie
2002	Thelma & Louise: The Last Journey	Charles de Lauzirika	Documentary
2002	Red Dragon	Brett Ratner	Uncredited
2003	Matchstick Men	Ridley Scott	
2004	Tricks of the Trade: Making 'Matchstick Men'	Charles de Lauzirika	Documentary
2004	Man on Fire	Tony Scott	
2005	Kingdom of Heaven	Ridley Scott	
2005	In Her Shoes	Curtis Hanson	
2005	Domino	Tony Scott	
2006	Orpheus	Bruce Beresford	TV movie
2006	Tristan & Isolde	Kevin Reynolds	
2006	The Path to Redemption	Charles de Lauzirika	Documentary
2006	A Good Year	Ridley Scott	
2006	Déjà Vu	Tony Scott	
2007	Law Dogs	Adam Bernstein	TV movie
2007	The Assassination of Jesse James by the Coward Robert Ford	Andrew Dominik	
2007	American Gangster	Ridley Scott	
2008	Body of Lies	Ridley Scott	
2009	Tell-Tale	Michael Cuesta	
2009	Into the Storm	Thaddeus O'Sullivan	TV movie
2009	The Taking of Pelham 123	Tony Scott	
2009	Cracks	Jordan Scott	
2010	Welcome to the Rileys	Jake Scott	
2010	Cyrus	Jay Duplass, Mark Duplass	
2010	Robin Hood	Ridley Scott	
2010	The A-Team	Joe Carnahan	
2010	Unstoppable	Tony Scott	
2011	Life in a Day	Kevin Macdonald	Documentary
2011	The Grey	Joe Carnahan	
2012	Prometheus	Ridley Scott	
2012	Britain in a Day	Morgan Matthews	Documentary
2012	Japan in a Day	Philip Martin, Gaku Narita	Documentary
2012	The Polar Bears	John Stevenson, David Scott	Animated short film
2013	The East	Zal Batmanglij	
2013	Stoker	Chan-wook Park	
2013	Welcome to the Punch	Eran Creevy	
2013	I/Nation	Timothy Gibbs	TV movie
2013	Killing Lincoln	Adrian Moat	TV movie
2013	Killing Kennedy	Nelson McCormick	TV movie
2013	Springsteen & I	Baillie Walsh	Documentary
2013	The Counselor	Ridley Scott	
2013	Out of the Furnace	Scott Cooper	
2013	Christmas in a Day	Kevin Macdonald	Documentary
2014	Galyntine	Greg Nicotero	TV movie
2014	Before I Go to Sleep	Rowan Joffé	
2014	Italy in a Day	Gabriele Salvatores	Documentary
2014	Exodus: Gods and Kings	Ridley Scott	
2014	Get Santa	Christopher Smith	
2015	American Express	Toby Dye	Documentary
2015	Killing Jesus	Christopher Menaul	TV movie
2015	Child 44	Daniel Espinosa	
2015	I Am Dying	Daniel Lindsay, T.J. Martin	Documentary
2015	Swedish House Mafia – Leave the World Behind	Christian Larson	Documentary
2015	Annabel's	Greg Fay	Documentary
2015	Equals	Drake Doremus	
2015	The Martian	Ridley Scott	
2015	Concussion	Peter Landesman	
2016	India in a Day	Richie Mehta	Documentary
2016	Morgan	Luke Scott	
2017	Phoenix Forgotten	Justin Barber	
2017	Alien: Covenant	Ridley Scott	
2017	2036: Nexus Dawn	Luke Scott	Short film
2017	2048: Nowhere to Run	Luke Scott	Short film
2017	Blade Runner 2049	Denis Villeneuve	
2017	Mark Felt: The Man Who Brought Down the White House	Peter Landesman	
2017	Murder on the Orient Express	Kenneth Branagh	
2017	All the Money in the World	Ridley Scott	
2017	Mindhorn	Sean Foley	
2018	American Woman	Jake Scott	
2019	The Aftermath	James Kent	
2019	Our Friend	Gabriela Cowperthwaite	
2019	Jungleland	Max Winkler	
2019	Earthquake Bird	Wash Westmoreland	
2021	Naked Singularity	Chase Palmer	
2021	The Last Duel	Ridley Scott	
2021	House of Gucci	Ridley Scott	
2022	Death on the Nile	Kenneth Branagh	
2023	Boston Strangler	Matt Ruskin	
2023	A Haunting in Venice	Kenneth Branagh	
2023	Napoleon	Ridley Scott	
2024	A Sacrifice	Jordan Scott	
2024	Alien: Romulus	Fede Álvarez	
2024	Gladiator II	Ridley Scott	
2025	Echo Valley	Michael Pearce	
2025	55	Shyam Madiraju	
2025	Trap House	Michael Dowse	
2026	The Dog Stars	Ridley Scott	
2027	Treasure Island	Ridley Scott	Pre-Production
TBA	The Riders	Edward Berger	Filming
TBA	Nightwatching	Brian Netto, Adam Schinder	Filming
TBA	Inground	Aaron Katz	Filming
TBA	Halftime Hero	Ole Sanders	Filming
TBA	They Like the Dark	Mike Pecci	Pre-production
TBA	Nue	Takashi Yamazaki	Pre-production
TBA	The Vesuvius Challenge	Daniel DiMauro, Morgan Pehme	Documentary

== Television ==
Year	Title	Format	Notes
1997–2000	The Hunger	TV series	44 episodes
2005–2010	Numbers	TV series	118 episodes
2007	The Company	Miniseries	3 episodes
2008	The Andromeda Strain	Miniseries	2 episodes
2009–2016	The Good Wife	TV series	156 episodes
2010	The Pillars of the Earth	Miniseries	8 episodes
2012	Coma	Miniseries	2 episodes
2012	World Without End	Miniseries	8 episodes
2012	Labyrinth	Miniseries	2 episodes
2014	Klondike	Miniseries	3 episodes
2014	Halo: Nightfall	Miniseries	5 episodes
2015–2019	The Man in the High Castle	TV series	40 episodes
2016–2017	Mercy Street	TV series	12 episodes
2016	BrainDead	TV series	13 episodes
2017	Taboo	TV series	8 episodes
2017–2022	The Good Fight	TV series	60 episodes
2017	Jean-Claude Van Johnson	TV series	6 episodes
2018–present	The Terror	TV series	20 episodes
2018–2019	Strange Angel	TV series	17 episodes
2019	The Passage	TV series	10 episodes
2019	A Christmas Carol	Miniseries	3 episodes
2020–2022	Raised by Wolves	TV series	18 episodes
2021	The Beast Must Die	Miniseries	5 episodes
2023	Kaleidoscope	TV series	8 episodes
2023	Still Missing Morgan	Miniseries	4 episodes
2023	Great Expectations	Miniseries	6 episodes
2025	Prime Target	Miniseries	8 episodes
2025	Dope Thief	TV series	8 episodes
2025	Alien: Earth	TV series	8 episodes
2026	Blade Runner 2099	Miniseries	8 episodes

== Animation ==
Year	Title	Directed by	Format	Notes
2006	Especial	Mic Graves	CGI-feature animation film	(produced in association with) Scott Free Vision

== Previously announced productions ==
=== Film ===
Title	Director(s)	Ref.
Jelly Babies	—N/a	
Six Bullets from Now	Stephen Kay	
Emma's War	Tony Scott	
Elegance	—N/a	
Vanishing Point	Samuel Bayer	
Chronicles of Darkness	—N/a	
Town House	John Carney	
Peony in Love	—N/a	
Potsdamer Platz	Tony Scott	
Ion	—N/a	
Archangels	Joseph Kosinski	
Empire of the Summer Moon	Scott Cooper	
A Conspiracy of Paper	—N/a	
Fly Me to the Moon	Sharon Maguire	
The Last Werewolf	—N/a	
Untitled romantic drama film	Luca Guadagnino	
The Bengali Detective	Stephen Frears	
The Big Blow	Oren Moverman / Reinaldo Marcus Green	
Wool	—N/a	
The Fishing Fleet	—N/a	
Mind MGMT	—N/a	
Untitled science-fiction short films	Martin Scorsese, Neill Blomkamp, Kathryn Bigelow, Sam Mendes	
Fog	Stephen Fingleton	
Tranquility Base	Paul Franklin	
The Asset	—N/a	
Fae	—N/a	
Vicious	—N/a	
A Better Place	—N/a	
Narco Sub	Antoine Fuqua	
David	—N/a	
The Devil in the Kitchen	—N/a	
Embraced by the Light	—N/a	
Timeless	Carlos Saldanha	
On Call in Hell	—N/a	
Cascade	Baltasar Kormakur	
Flashman	—N/a	
Dying to Be Me	—N/a	
Alien 5	Neill Blomkamp	
The Twisted	—N/a	
Claire	—N/a	
The Magic Castle	—N/a	
Untitled Andy Weir script	—N/a	
The Hunger	Luke Scott	
The Power of the Dog	—N/a	
The King of LA	Julius Avery	
The Force	James Mangold	
War Party	Andrew Dominik	
Human, Anew	—N/a	
Hello America	—N/a	
The Beast Is an Animal	Bert and Bertie	
Neither Confirm Nor Deny	—N/a	
Task Force Two	—N/a	
Amman Mission	—N/a	
Sapiens	Asif Kapadia	
The Riders	—N/a	
First Ascent	Jake Scott	
Panopticon	Andrés Baiz	
Outside	Henrik Hansen	
The Infinite Machine	Shyam Madiraju	
Big Thunder Mountain Railroad	Bert and Bertie	
Gravity Rush	Anna Mastro	
The Corner	—N/a	
Children of the Jungle	—N/a	
O	—N/a	
Ruins	—N/a	
Here Be Monsters	Joachim Rønning	
American Huckster	—N/a	
God of the Rodeo	Rosalind Ross	

=== Television ===
Title	Director	Ref.
Pompeii	—N/a	
Pyrates	Stephen Hopkins	
Compadre	—N/a	
3001: The Final Odyssey	—N/a	
Blood and Thunder	—N/a	
Jean Claude Van Johnson	—N/a	
Rubber Guns	—N/a	
Sensory	—N/a	
Untitled Sunny Hostin drama	—N/a	
Freedom	—N/a	
Resonant	Gerard McMurray	
