= Andrea Dalla Costa =

Italian artist

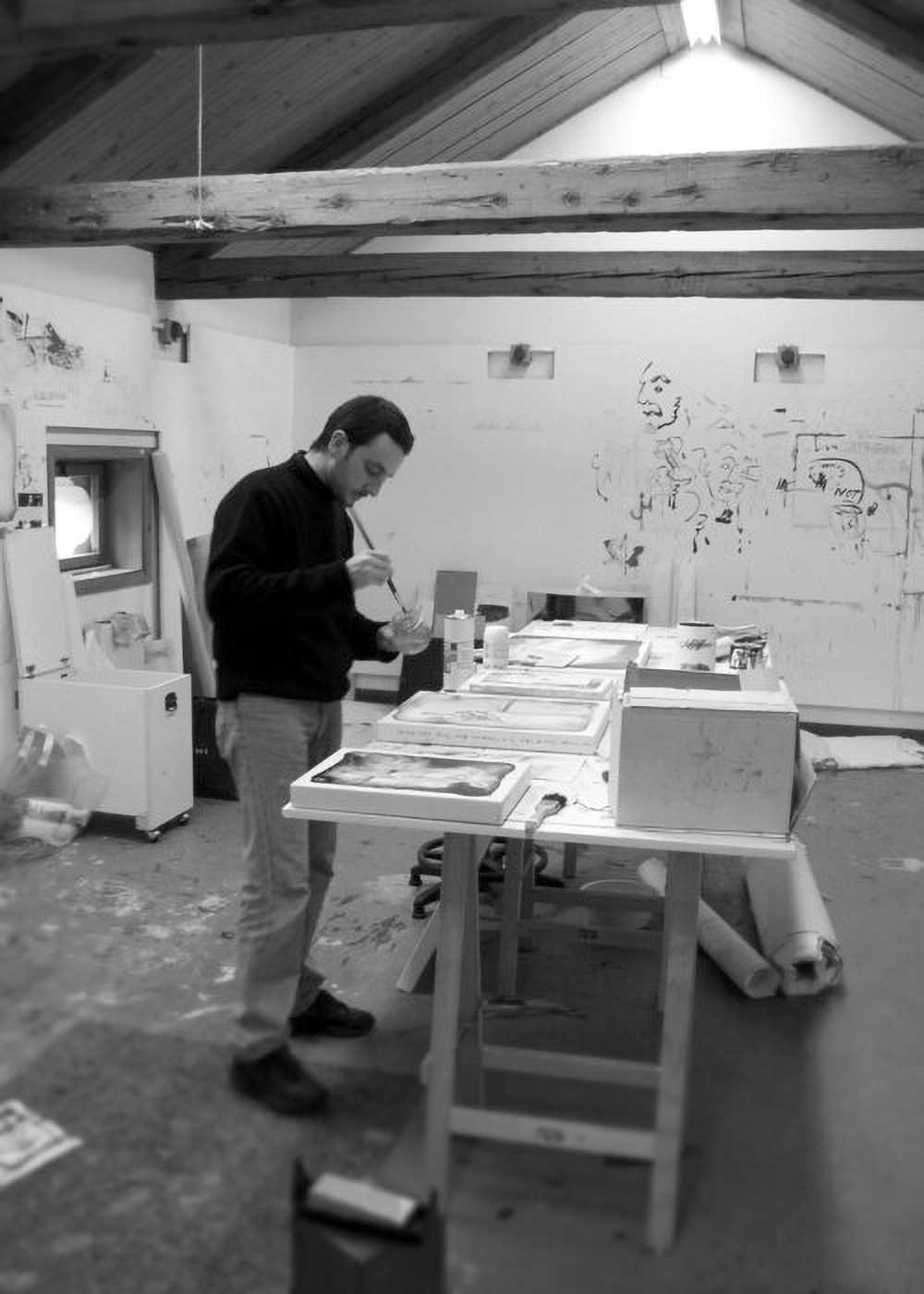
- Andrea Dalla Costa atelier in Villa Manin, Passariano
- Occupations: Painter, photographer, filmmaker, musician and art director
- Years active: 1992–present

Andrea Dalla Costa is an Italian photographer, filmmaker, painter, musician and art director.

== Biography ==
Following his artistic studies at Academy of Fine Arts of Venice in 2005, he participated at the 51st Venice Biennale, the group Temperaturambiente inside the Italian pavilion.

In 2010, follow the direction of hypermedia museum exhibition of the great exhibition "Mattia Bortoloni, Piazzetta, Giovanni Battista Tiepolo: the 'Veneto 700" at the Palace of oaks Rovigo ", in collaboration with Vittorio Sgarbi.

The same year will be selected among the co-directors of the first social history of the movie Life in a Day, produced by Ridley Scott and directed by Oscar winner Kevin MacDonald; the project of crowdsourcing film attended by more than 80,000 video makers from 192 countries in the world, 344 of them will be chosen.

In 2011, he participated in the second feature in crowdsourcing from Scott Free Productions, Britain in a Day, held in collaboration with the BBC in the UK. Attended by more than 2,500 video-makers, he was selected from among the 312 co-directors, of whom only he is the only Italian.

In 2013 he won the Musiclip Festival in Barcelona in the category of Best Director (Mejor Dirección Novel, 2013), with the videoclip of "Nuove prospettive" by Cristian Imparato.

In 2016 he participated in the TED of Castelfranco Veneto with his own speech "The modern storm", inspired by the opera The Tempest (Giorgione).

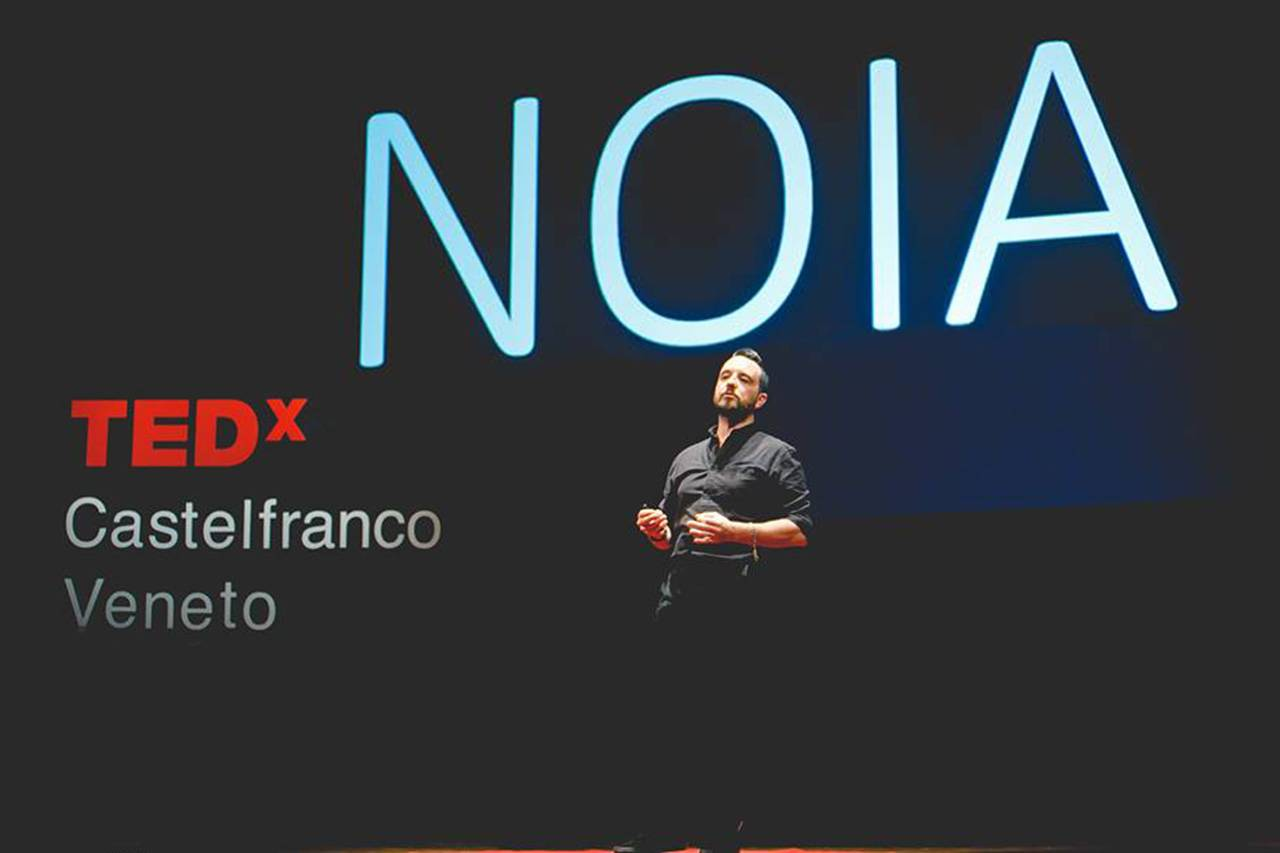
TEDx Castelfranco Veneto 2016

== Works ==
=== Discography ===
- 2025 – Val Resia – DNArt project (Independent record label)

=== Books illustrator and Author ===
- 2022 – Super Isaia e i voli piripiripindarici ISBN 979-12-210-2433-3
- 2021 – Fata Natura e l'orto magico ISBN 979-12-210-0488-5

=== Books illustrator only ===
- 2018 – La Principessa TIC e il Pirata TAC ISBN 978-88-7541-738-3
- 2016 – Il volo perfetto di Massimo il Folletto ISBN 979-12-200-2610-9

=== Film (as director) ===
- 2014 – Le note di Giulia (Nomination David di Donatello for Best Short Film)
- 2014 – Robert Plant – Rainbow (Videoclip, 3rd place in GeneroTV)
- 2013 – Cristian Imparato – Nuove prospettive (Videoclip, 1st place in Barcelona Musiclip Festival)
- 2013 – The Aroma of Perfection (Illy Coffee documentary)

=== Film (as co-director) ===
- 2014 – The Giver (creditis film). Director Phillip Noyce
- 2012 – Britain in a Day (crowd-sourced documentary film). Production companies Ridley Scott Associates
- 2011 – Buon compleanno Italia 150° (documentary film). Production companies Sky
- 2011 – Life in a Day (crowd-sourced documentary film). Director Kevin Macdonald, Production companies Ridley Scott Associates
