= Italy in a Day =

- Directed by: Gabriele Salvatores
- Production companies: Indiana Production; Rai Cinema; Scott Free Productions
- Release date: 2 September 2014 (Venice)
- Running time: 75 minutes
- Countries: Italy; United Kingdom
- Languages: Italian; Chinese; English

Italy in a Day - Un giorno da italiani is a 2014 Italian-British documentary film directed by Gabriele Salvatores. It was part of the Out of Competition section at the 71st Venice International Film Festival.

Salvatores used the crowdsourced documentary Britain in a Day as a prototype to produce Italy in a Day, which included clips selected from 45,000 video submissions recorded on 26 October 2013. The film was said to reflect the fears of Italians during a recession, their uncertainty over their national identity, and their refusal to give up on dreams.

== See also ==
- Life in a Day (2011)
- Life in a Day 2020
