= Okhwan Yoon =

South Korean peace activist

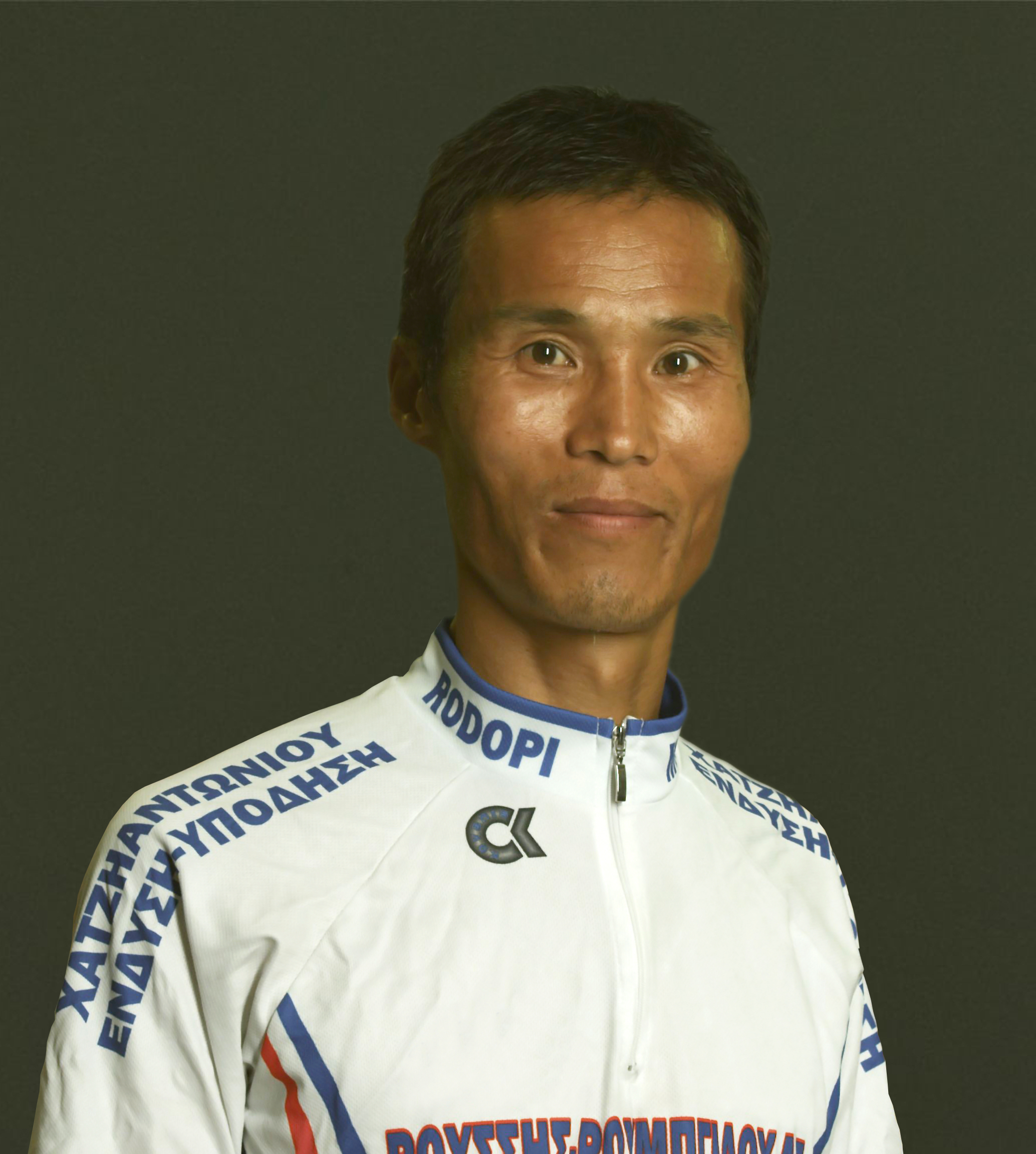
- Okhwan in 2011
- Citizenship: South Korean
- Occupation: Activist for unify Korea

Korean name
- Hangul: 윤옥환
- RR: Yun Okhwan
- MR: Yun Okhwan

Okhwan Yoon is a South Korean peace activist who has traveled to 193 countries by bicycle since 2001 in order to reunify the Korean peninsula. He is also a philosopher, writer, political analyst and peace activist.

Okhwan Yoon got his first bike when he was 6 years old and started to cycle around the rooms of his family home. In his teenage years, after coming back from school, he would ride around the villages near Seoul until it got dark. He wondered who lived behind the mountains and what it looked like there.

His mother raised him to be independent. In 1984, Yoon was arrested while demonstrating against the Chun Doo-hwan regime.

As a university student he was thrown into prison and tortured after peacefully protesting for Korean reunification during the Chun military regime. In 1987 Yoon graduated in law with a bachelor's degree and in 1991 he started a trading company in South Korea. In June 2001, he quit his career as a businessman. He embarked on a bicycle journey, his stated purpose to support the idea of a more peaceful world and to plant the seed of the reunification of Korea. He has survived five car crashes which resulted in surgery, contracted malaria five times, was kidnapped in Afghanistan and South Sudan, and almost lost his life from extreme heat and cold. He was brutally beaten and illegally arrested by police in Thailand and has undergone severe psychological trauma as a result of the human rights violation.

In September 2009 Yoon met Marek Mackovič, a Slovak director, in Cyprus. Marek started to shoot a feature-length film about Yoon. On July 24, 2010, he filmed him in Kathmandu, Nepal and submitted the footage for the Life in a Day project, directed by Kevin MacDonald and produced by Ridley Scott. As top contributors, Marek Mackovič and Okhwan Yoon were invited to the premiere at Sundance Film Festival, where it debuted in January 2011.

In the summer of 2014, Okhwan visited The Cook Islands, the 193rd country on his journey that has spanned over six continents. He has been to every U.N. country aside from North Korea. He ran marathons in Prague and France (Nice-Cannes) in 2011. He plans to climb Mount Everest with his bicycle, and to visit Micronesia, Tuvalu, and Aruba. He eventually hopes to join the National Assembly of South Korea and publish a book about his journey.
