= Alex McDonald (prospector) =

Alexander McDonald
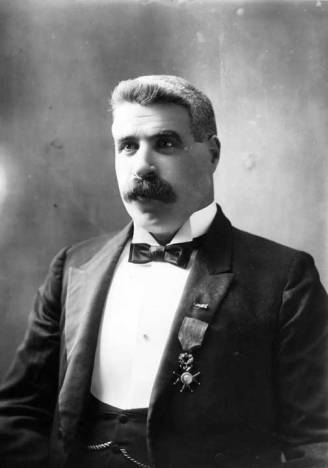
- Alex McDonald as a Knight of the Order of St. Gregory c.1899
- Born: 1859; Antigonish, Nova Scotia, Canada
- Died: 1909 (aged 49–50); Clear Creek, Yukon, Canada
- Resting place: Dawson City, Yukon, Canada
- Occupations: Gold prospector, entrepreneur

Alexander "Big Alex" McDonald (1859–1909) was a Canadian gold prospector who made (and lost) a fortune in the Klondike Gold Rush, earning himself the title "King of the Klondike".

== Biography ==
The son of Scottish immigrants, McDonald was born in Antigonish, Nova Scotia. He was an unsuccessful prospector, having tried his luck in the Colorado gold fields, before heading to the gold rush in Juneau, Alaska, in the late 1880s. In 1895 or 1896, he was in the Yukon, employed by the Alaska Commercial Company at Forty-Mile to buy mining properties. Gold was discovered in the region in 1897.

He was nicknamed the "Big Moose from Antigonish", "Big Alex" and "Big Mac". He was described by a contemporary as:

... a large brawny, swarthy man, canny and close of mouth, with a curious habit of slowly rubbing his chin whenever a new proposition is presented to him. He makes it a rule to first say "No" to every proposal, however alluring, thus gaining time to think it over.

One of the early arrivals in the Klondike, he purchased either half or all of Claim 30 on Eldorado Creek from a Russian named Zarnosky or Zarnowsky for a sack of flour and a side of bacon. That claim proved to be one of the richest of the Klondike, yielding $5000 a day. McDonald's slowness of speech hid a shrewdness and business acumen that enabled him to amass a tremendous fortune, somewhere between seven and 27 million dollars. Rather than just work that single piece of land, he leased it to two other miners, who did the actual work for half of the proceeds. In the first 45 days, that amounted to $30,000. He then proceeded to buy up other claims, and by the end of the year he had acquired 28. By 1898, he had interests in 75 mines, making him the largest landowner and employer in the area.

That year, when the local Catholic church burned down, he donated $30,000, more than enough to pay for its rebuilding. When Father William Judge started building St. Mary's Hospital, McDonald once again made a large donation. In the winter of 1898–1899, he toured Europe, finding time to marry, in London, Margaret Chisholm, the twenty-year-old daughter of the superintendent of the Thames Water Police, and to be received by Pope Leo XIII, who made him a Knight of the Order of St. Gregory in appreciation of his generosity.

However, though the gold rush eventually died down, McDonald continued to buy land claims, now mostly worthless, squandering his money. Living alone in a cabin on Clearwater Creek, he died of a heart attack in 1909. His remaining assets of $30,000 did not cover his debts. His widow benefited from a life insurance policy urged upon him by another Klondike tycoon, Belinda Mulrooney.

McDonald's legend was retold in an anonymous poem called "King of the Klondike" (c. 1910).

His resting place is in the cemetery in Dawson City.
