= Grand Forks Hotel =

Roadhouse in Dawson City, Canada

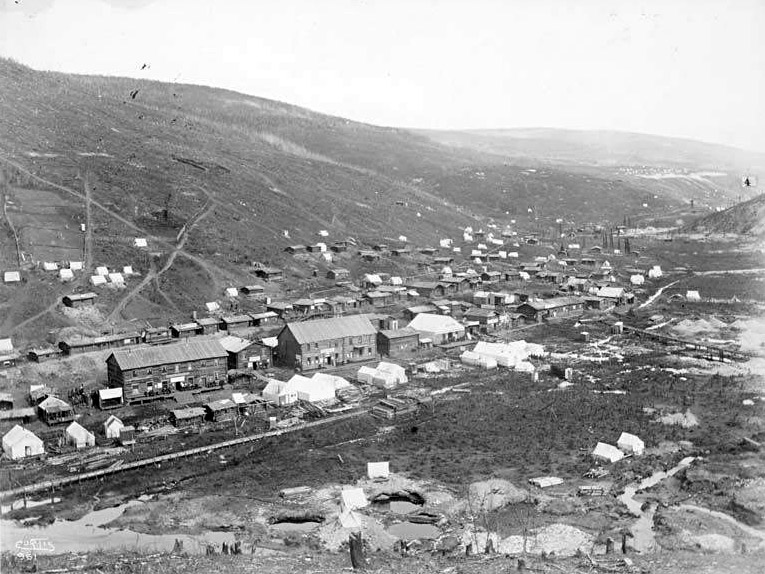
- Grank Forks Hotel in 1898, second building from left

- Location within Canada

General information
- Location: Grand Forks, Yukon
- Coordinates: 63.9202°N 139.3169°W
- Opening: August 1897
- Closed: 1911

Design and construction
- Developer: Belinda Mulrooney

The Grand Forks Hotel was a prominent roadhouse during the Klondike Gold Rush, situated near Dawson City in the Yukon region of Canada.

== Background ==
In 1897, large amounts of gold were discovered in the Yukon, prompting huge numbers of prospectors to travel to the remote region, an event that is known as the Klondike Gold Rush. Belinda Mulrooney, a small-time businesswoman, arrived in Dawson City that year, intending to import goods and establish her own enterprises. She established a restaurant and a shop in the city and a business building homes for the immigrant prospectors. Mulrooney began to investigate opportunities outside Dawson City, along the creeks where the gold was being mined and decided that the spot where the Eldorado Creek met the Bonanza Creek would be an ideal place for a roadhouse hotel.

== Structure and operation ==
Mulrooney's new roadhouse was a large, two-story building constructed of logs. On the ground floor was a bar and dining room, with the first floor used for accommodation in the form of multiple bunk beds. At the rear of the property were kennels for the various husky dogs used for transport in the region. Contractors were brought in from Dawson City to carry out the work, which was complete by August 1897. A separate cabin for Mulrooney was later built nearby. A safe in the hotel was used to store the gold typically used as money amongst the prospecting community. The timbers used to build the hotel shrunk over time, however, resulting in a numerous gaps emerging in the structure.

The Grand Forks Hotel provided food, drink and accommodation to the local and visiting community. Despite chronic shortages during the winter months of the gold rush, Mulrooney was able to keep the hotel suitably stocked, with a dinner costing $3.50 and accommodation and food charged at $12; the drinks and cigars served were the most expensive in the region. Typical meals included bacon and beans and canned meats, with moose heart and pickled nose of moose served on special occasions. The roadhouse also doubled as a trading post, a centre for storing gold and a church.

A community grew up around the hotel and became the second largest town in the Yukon region.

== End of the hotel ==
In 1899, the Klondike gold rush had peaked. Mulrooney decided to leave the Yukon and sold the Grand Forks Hotel in May 1899. After 1906, the town went into decline and heavy dredging equipment destroyed the site in 1911.

== Bibliography ==
- Backhouse, France (1995). Women of the Klondike. Vancouver, Canada: Whitecap Books. ISBN 978-1-55110-375-4.
- Berton, Pierre (2001). Klondike: The Last Great Gold Rush 1896–1899. Toronto: Anchor Canada. ISBN 0-385-65844-3.
- Grey, Charlotte (2010). Gold Diggers: Striking it Rich in the Klondike. Berkeley, U.S.: Counterpoint. ISBN 978-1-58243-611-1.
