= Life in a Day 2020 =

Crowdsourced documentary film

- Film poster
- Directed by: Kevin Macdonald
- Produced by: Jack Arbuthnott; Tim Partridge
- Edited by: Mdhamiri Á Nkemi; Nse Asuquo; Sam Rice-Edwards
- Music by: Matthew Herbert; Harry Gregson-Williams
- Production companies: RSA Films; Flying Object
- Distributed by: YouTube Originals
- Release dates: February 1, 2021 (Sundance); February 6, 2021 (YouTube)
- Running time: 86 minutes
- Country: United States

Life in a Day 2020 is a 2021 American crowd-sourced documentary film directed by Kevin Macdonald. The sequel to the 2011 film Life in a Day, it premiered at the Sundance Film Festival on February 1, 2021, and on YouTube February 6, to generally favorable critical reviews. Like its predecessor, it comprises a wide array of selected video clips showing things happening in the world on one day: July 25, 2020.

== Summary ==
Life in a Day 2020 begins at dawn, with a montage of mothers giving birth. Then, morning rises and people awaken, going about their lives; among them is a homeless man affected by the COVID-19 pandemic. A montage of Internet content creators filming is followed by a child named Sondos celebrating her birthday. People fall in love and kiss each other. After a man fails to attract the attention of a neighboring crush, people marry, while a man is rejected and a couple breaks up.

After showing students graduating, the film cuts to the mother of Alexander "ATG" Lucas, who was featured in the original Life in a Day (2011), saying he died on February 18, 2020, due to COVID-19 complications. This prefaces a montage featuring dead elderly and graveyards, and another featuring the effects of the pandemic, such as isolation, vaccine experimenting, and a surge in video calling. Meanwhile, a man devotes himself to not wearing masks, a trans woman does street dancing amid harassment, and a former soldier reflects on his time serving.

Another montage plays, featuring a student driver, a baby learning to walk, an elder woman learning to cycle, a disabled woman testing her robotic arm, and a hyacinth macaw named Love doing her first flight. A traffic officer gives tickets to people parking cars at red curbs. An elderly expresses gratitude in his life, while another laments existentially on the pandemic. A paralyzed man talks about people treating him as if he is not human. Another montage covers the worldwide George Floyd protests, followed by a retreat leader saying everyone is connected through the cosmos.

A montage features various physical labor, with a sweeper harshly criticized by a citizen and a shoeshine worker struggling to attract people amid fear of COVID-19. The homeless man from earlier flies drones as a way of coping, while others skydive, and a horse rider wins a race. A trainspotter achieves his goal of spotting all seven Class I railroads in a day. Amid isolation, people find connections with animals, and a furry says the fashion style is his way of self-expression. Another montage laments air pollution and natural disasters.

People talk about old memories and attend religious activities. An expecting centenarian urges happiness in life. The woman that failed in getting pregnant earlier says she wants her future kids to live in a kind society. As night falls, stores close; some people go home, while others rejoice in celebrations. Some experience joy, others sorrow. Before sleeping, a boy says he wishes people can communicate with the dead. The film ends with a girl trying to put viewers to peace by hearing waves crashing in the dark.

== Theme and production ==
The announcement of the film was published on the movie's YouTube channel on July 8, 2020, coinciding with the COVID-19 pandemic, the George Floyd protests, natural disasters, etc., which Sundance Film Festival director Tabitha Jackson sees as "the perfect time to premiere this for a new edition of a work that so powerfully demonstrates the power of cinematic storytelling to reveal and celebrate our shared humanity".

The film follows the same structure as its 2011 predecessor, comprising selected vlogs of people all around the world, talking about themselves on the same day, July 25, 2020. Submissions were open from July 25 to August 2. A team of multilingual editors and researchers selected noteworthy submissions.

Kevin Macdonald sees the film as a "time capsule," stating:

I guess any movie reflects its moment, whether you consciously want it to or not, but this even more so. I think it will be a time capsule for the ages. We're living through this time of great political upheaval, and that's maybe at the forefront of our thoughts. But for a lot of people, the lived day-to-day experience, which is what I'm hoping we'll capture in the film, is not going to be about those big issues, at least not directly. It's going to be about, you know, 'it's bath time for the baby,' or, 'what do I do on my Saturday off,' or, 'I don't have enough food to eat, and here's how I get by.' I always say to people, 'What's boring to you, what's normal to you, is gonna be fascinating to other people.'

The producers did not compensate individual film-makers whose work was included for their creative efforts, although they were credited as co-directors of the project.

== Critical response ==
On Rotten Tomatoes, Life in a Day 2020 has an approval rating of 70% based on 23 reviews, with an average rating of 6.70/10. On Metacritic, the film has a weighted average score of 54 out of 100 based on reviews from 7 critics, indicating "mixed or average" reviews.

Most critics came to an agreement that the film is a comprehensive depiction of life during the COVID-19 pandemic, with the Chicago Sun-Times calling it "wholly predictable yet undeniably effective", and Variety comparing it favorably with its predecessor for focusing on highlighting themes of unity, though noted that this approach caused the film to lack themes of "seeking and stressing life’s more diverse and disorienting juxtapositions". Many also praise the choice of videos and compilation style, which they observed to be emotional and heartwarming, feelings ambient in a variety of ways during the pandemic, though Variety called certain choices "irregular", and Peter Bradshaw of The Guardian criticized its apparent context-free nature and that the compilation "look[s] more like a corporate ad". He, however, praised many of the videos, which he found to be lively.

The San Francisco Chronicle's G. Allen Johnson went so far as comparing the film to that of the Voyager Golden Record, labeling Life in a Day 2020 "an ethnographic record of our planet in a moment of time", and expresses anticipation for future follow-ups.
