= Life in a Day (2011 film) =

2011 crowdsourced documentary film

- Theatrical release poster
- Directed by: Kevin Macdonald
- Produced by: Liza Marshall
- Edited by: Joe Walker
- Music by: Harry Gregson-Williams; Matthew Herbert
- Production companies: Scott Free Productions; YouTube; LG Corp
- Distributed by: National Geographic Entertainment
- Release dates: 21 January 2011 (YouTube); 27 January 2011 (Sundance)
- Running time: 95 minutes
- Countries: United Kingdom; United States
- Language: Various languages
- Box office: $252,788

Life in a Day is a crowd-sourced documentary film comprising an arranged series of video clips selected from 80,000 clips submitted to the YouTube video sharing website, the clips showing respective occurrences from around the world on a single day, 24 July 2010.

The film is 94 minutes 53 seconds long and includes scenes selected from 4,500 hours of footage in 80,000 submissions from 192 nations. The completed film debuted at the Sundance Film Festival on 27 January 2011 and the premiere was streamed live on YouTube. On 31 October 2011, YouTube announced that Life in a Day would be available for viewing on its website free of charge, and on DVD.

== Production ==
The film was produced by Scott Free Productions and the YouTube video sharing site. The film was distributed by National Geographic Entertainment. The visual effects were designed by Lip Sync Post.

The film was the creation of a collaboration with YouTube, Ridley Scott Associates and LG electronics, announced on 6 July 2010. Users sent in videos supposed to be recorded on 24 July 2010, and then Ridley Scott produced the film and edited the videos into a film with Kevin Macdonald and film editor Joe Walker, consisting of footage from some of the contributors. All chosen footage authors are credited as co-directors. Users retained the copyrights to their video submissions but agreed to grant a non-exclusive license for their footage to be used in the film.

The film's music was composed by composer and conductor Harry Gregson-Williams, along with Matthew Herbert. The film's opening song, composed by Herbert, was performed by English singer-songwriter Ellie Goulding. The film also features the song "Jerusalem" by Kieran Leonard and "Future Prospect" by Biggi Hilmars.

Macdonald told The Wall Street Journal that the project was initially conceived as a way to commemorate the fifth birthday of YouTube, and that he wanted to "take the humble YouTube video, ... and elevate it into art." Editor Joe Walker said that as he understood it, the concept for the crowd-sourced documentary came from Ridley Scott's production company "Scott Free U.K." and from YouTube, while Macdonald explained more specifically that "the inspiration for me was a British group from the 1930s called the Mass Observation movement. They asked hundreds of people all over Britain to write diaries recording the details of their lives on one day a month and answer a few simple questions. ... These diaries were then organised into books and articles with the intention of giving voice to people who weren't part of the "elite" and to show the intricacy and strangeness of the seemingly mundane."

Macdonald began his "Around the world in 80,000 clips" article in The Guardian by posing the questions, "What do you love? What do you fear? What's in your pocket?" and explaining that "one day last summer, I asked ordinary people around the world to answer those three questions and spend a day filming their lives." The 80,000 individual clips received amounted to 4,500 hours of electronic footage. Macdonald explained that about 75% of the film's content came from people contacted through YouTube, traditional advertising, TV shows, and newspapers; the remaining 25% came from cameras sent out to the developing world, Macdonald pointing out "It was important to represent the whole world." At a reported cost of £40,000, "we did resort to snail mail for sending out 400 cameras to parts of the developing world – and getting back the resulting video cards." Macdonald later remarked that he regretted not sending out a far smaller number of cameras but providing training in camera operation and desired type of content: "Naively, I hadn't realised how alien, not only the concept of a documentary is to a lot of people (in the developing world), but also the idea that your own opinions are worth sharing."

Macdonald expressed to The Wall Street Journal that the film "could only be made in the last five years because ... you can get enough people who will have an understanding of how to shoot something." Walker told Wired magazine's Angela Watercutter that the film "couldn't have been made without technology. Ten years ago it would've been impossible." Macdonald explained that YouTube "allowed us to tap into a pre-existing community of people around the world and to have a means of distributing information about the film and then receiving people's 'dailies'. It just wouldn't have been organizationally or financially feasible to undertake this kind of project pre-YouTube."

The filmmaking team "used YouTube's ability to collect all of this material and then we had this sort of sweatshop of people, all multilingual film students, to sift through this material. It couldn't have been done any other way. Nobody had ever done a film like this before, so we had to sort of make it up as we went along." "To put (the 4500 hours of raw footage) in context, I just cut a feature film for Steve McQueen and there's 21 hours of [film] for that."

Walker, whose team edited the whole film over seven weeks, remarked to Adam Sternbergh of The New York Times that "The analogy is like being told to make Salisbury Cathedral, and then being introduced to a field full of rubble. You have to start looking for buttresses and things that connect together." Walker indicated that a team of roughly two dozen researchers, chosen both for a cinematic eye and proficiency with languages, watched, logged, tagged, and rated each clip on a scale of one to five stars. Walker remarked that "the vast amount of material was two stars", and that he and director Kevin Macdonald reviewed the four-star and five-star rated clips.

In addition to the star rating system, the editing/selecting team also organised the 80,000 clips according to countries, themes and video quality as part of the selection process, and further had to convert from 60 different frame rates to make the result cinematically acceptable. All the logging and researching was done using the Quantum CatDV media asset management software.

== Themes and content ==
Macdonald said that the film focused on a single day "because a day is the basic temporal building block of human life—wherever you are," with Walker adding that the particular day, 24 July 2010, was chosen because it was the first Saturday after the World Cup.

Concerning the chronology of the film and the order of the clips, Macdonald explained that he let the 300 hours of "best bits" tell him what the themes and structure of the film should be, likening the material to a Rorschach test—"you will see in it what you want to see in it." Joe Walker further explained that "We always wanted to have a number of structures, so it's not just midnight to midnight, but it's also from light to dark and from birth to death. ... bashing things together and making them resonate against each other and provoking thought."

Macdonald said he saw the movie "as a metaphor of the experience of being on the Internet. ... clicking from one place to another, in this almost random way…following our own thoughts, following narrative and thematic paths." Betsy Sharkey wrote in the Los Angeles Times that "this fast-paced documentary is shaped as much by Internet savvy as traditional filmmaking, which doesn't make the experience of it any less satisfying, or the implications any less provocative." "The story is told through the voices of the contributors, but mostly it's the images that do the heavy lifting."

Macdonald explained that the film "doesn't have a traditional story or a traditional narrative, but it has thematic movement [and] recurring characters." He praised certain specific contributions, including "the most technically amazing skydiving shot I have ever seen in any film" and "a hand going up to a window pane and picking a fly off and filming the hand walking through the house and letting the fly go—and you see the fly take off in the distance." Asked if there any particular submission that crystallized the film's theme, Macdonald cited "the family who had been going through cancer." More generally, Macdonald praised the immediacy that a handycam permits.

Ian Buckwalter of Washingtonian magazine said that "the familiar beats of the day (were) cut together to show that we're actually far more similar than we are different." The Washington Post's Michael O'Sullivan similarly noted that "the people whose lives form the spine of Life feel familiar... Their hopes and joys, disappointments and fears are our own." Liz Braun, writing in the Toronto Sun, said that "The overall sense of the project appears to be: It's good to be alive. ... According to the film, there are things that divide us as humans, but far more things that unite us." Toronto Star critic Peter Howell was in accord, observing that the "film shows things (what) billions of us do every day, perhaps thinking that we are somehow alone in our pursuits. Yet we couldn't be more connected." However, The Boston Globe's Tom Russo gave director "Macdonald and crew credit for picking out good, clear, telling contrasts, and not sweating potential heavy-handedness," citing contrasts between "one smug contributor pull[ing] a set of Lamborghini keys from his pocket, ... then mov[ing] on to ragged-looking Third Worlders amusedly scoffing at the idea that they'd have anything in their pockets," and a Westerner "quietly worries about losing his hair, while an older Afghan man quietly worries about getting through the day alive."

Sharkey described the progression of the film: "Beginning with videos that start pre-dawn then moving through morning, afternoon and evening, ... the rituals that define a day begin to emerge. Beyond an extraordinary range of cultures, terrain and styles reflected, which are captivating on their own, the film stands as a stirring reminder of how ordinary and yet eclectic humanity can be. If Life in a Day is any measure, we are a quirky, likeable, unpredictable and yet predictable bunch."

Yumi Goto of TIME LightBox remarked that "the most striking aspect of this documentary is that it's the first crowdsourced, user-generated content to hit the big screen." O'Sullivan said that, being "alternately funny, scary, boring, moving, amateurish and gorgeous, it is a pretty spectacular thing: a crowdsourced movie that manages to feel singular and whole." Anthony Benigno wrote in Filmcritic.com that the film "is pretty much the first social-media movie ever made."

The New York Times' Adam Sternbergh wrote that "the film's most memorable moments are the ones of unexpected intimacy. ... The film aims to tell the story of a planet, but it's the vulnerability of these individual moments, contributed as part of a larger project, that lingers." The Los Angeles Times' Betsy Sharkey wrote that "The fact that we all experienced that day is part of what gives the documentary an unusual kind of relatability."

Sharkey characterised the film as being "the most hopeful yet from Macdonald, a director who's made his reputation by digging into the more corrupted and conflicted side of human nature with One Day in September, his Oscar-winning documentary on the 1972 Munich massacre of Israeli Olympic athletes... [T]he lightness [Macdonald has] unearthed in Life in a Day has an earthy and at times euphoric appeal."

== Reception ==
Life in a Day received a generally positive reception from film critics. Rotten Tomatoes reports that 79% of 75 critics have given the film a positive review, with a rating average of 7.1 out of 10. Metacritic gave the film a rating average of 58/100, indicating "mixed or average" reviews.

Helen O'Hara from Empire stated that the film was "moving and insightful. Not a classic by any means, but a fascinating glimpse of the way we live today." Michael O'Sullivan of the Washington Post gave the film three and a half stars out of four, saying that "Life in a Day is, without exaggeration, a profound achievement." Peter Howell, a critic of the Toronto Star, gave the film three out of four stars, saying "the vast majority of the film feels undeniably real and incredibly inspiring." Wired magazine's Angela Watercutter wrote that the film "brims with intimacy and urgency."

CNN's Mark Rabinowitz wrote that the film is "a rousing success of an experiment: quite possibly the first large-scale, global use of the Internet to create meaningful and beautiful art," with CNN Newsroom's Josh Levs remarking that the film is "the best time capsule in the history of the world." Ian Buckwalter of Washingtonian called the condensed experiences "breathtaking" and "as riveting as any narrative."

Liz Braun, writing in the Toronto Sun, said that "a lot is predictable" and "It's all familiar for the most part, and it's all mildly interesting," but also cited several "sequences that fully engage a viewer emotionally." Andrew Schenker from Slant Magazine criticized the film by stating: "Only a few snippets escape the uncritical narcissism that the film celebrates." Contentions such as Schenker's were contradicted by The New York Times' Adam Sternbergh who wrote that "if the knock against the Internet... is that it stokes our collective narcissism, this film, in its best moments, proves the opposite: not a global craving for exposure but a surprising universal willingness to allow ourselves to be exposed."

Though saying Life in a Day "isn't a bad movie" and there are "fits and spurts" in which the film is "actually quite beautiful," "funny" and "moving", Anthony Benigno from Filmcritic.com asserted that documentaries should have a point, narrative, conflict and goal, but called this film "scattershot" and "at its worst, veering closer into exploitation...and even voyeurism." V.A. Musetto, a critic from the New York Post, said about the film: "Judging by the National Geographic doc Life in a Day, a lot of nothing happened on 24 July 2010." A counterpoint was expressed by the Los Angeles Times' Betsy Sharkey: "the world community had a lot of interesting things on its mind, but it still took filmmakers like Macdonald and Walker to help us say it with feeling."

Two writers for The New York Times adopted opposing opinions. Mike Hale's review asserted that "much of the material is interesting in its own right... but... the problem is the resolutely conventional and soft-headed way in which that material has been assembled," and that "the overall tone remains gee-whiz." In contrast, Adam Sternbergh concluded that "the montages of ordinary acts, repeated from Japan to Dubai to Las Vegas, take on a kind of profundity."

== Criticism of free labour ==
The film has been criticized for its use of free labour. In the film industry, the production teams required to produce images and sounds are normally paid. However, in the case of Life in a Day, the labour undertaken by YouTube users to shoot the content used in film was not compensated, even though the film was screened in traditional theater venues for a profit.

== List of contributors ==
All authors of the videos are credited as co-directors.

- Phil Loarie
- Natalia Andreadis
- Kjell Bismeyer
- Jon Haas
- Per-Terie Gabrielsen
- Julia Gabrielsen
- Daniel Gastelu
- Kristopher Kauth
- Laec Christensen
- Lilit Movsisyan
- Marc Proctor
- Marianne G. Petrino
  and Thomas E. Shaad
- Nick Roden
- Soma Helmi
- Harvey Glen
- Jan Van Etten
- Andrew Reams
- Cristina Bocchialini
  and Ayman El Gazwy
- Sean Grey
- Joseph Michael
- Paul Richard Smith
- Xaver Walser
- David Saddler
- Alejo Crisostomo
- Chris Cate
- Alejandro Romero Pallares
- Beniamino Brogi
- Sergey Agapov
- Andreea Diana Tanasescu
- Francesco Villa
- Vania Da Rui
- Angela Hockabout
- Effer Lecebe
- Marek Mackovic
- Andreas Thiele
- S.Prince Ennares Periyar
- Alexander Rastopcin
- Thomas S. Stepleton
- Jennifer Howd
- Christophe Querry
- Cindy Baer
- Igor Saramago
- 2Stupids
- Jorge Bastardo
- Jochem Koole
- Javier De Lara Rodríguez
- Caryn Waechter
- Hiroaki Aikawa
- Ester Brym Ortiz Guillen
- Friedrich Joachim Tragauer
- Shawn Gadberry
- Toniu Xou
  and Patricia Martínez Del Hoyo
- Marco Cavallini
- Ivan Zuber
- Felix Henrichs
- Amil Shivji
- Thomas Ellis
- Boris Gryshkevych
- Christopher Santiago
- Julie Couturier
- Geneviève Dulude-De Celles
  and Sarah Mannering
- Loressa Clisby
- Javed Kana
- Fred Neukam
- Justin P. Janowski
- Mario Obst
- Alex Laney
- Andrew Ray Johnson
- Guido Berger
- Tahlia Merrill
- Linda López
- Yevgeniy Vaskevich
- Christian Buch Iversen
- Linda Matarasso
- Omar Ortiz
- Bailey Sutton
- Adrian Njenga
- Kate Mead
- Will Brewster
- Ryan Lynch
- Andrew John Wilhelmsen
- Alice Wenley
- Kevin Liuzzo
- Melissa Guzmán
- John Lesinka Leng'eny
- Aditya Kolli
- Jusitn Swan
- Bruno Xhoxhi
- Alaa Hassan
- Bob Liginki jr
- Suzanne Lucas
- Jaai' Dukstra
- Neelendra R.
- Vetrivell Velumuthu
- Rhys Wood
- Denis Baribault
- Brian Kragtwijk
- Cléméntine Isaac
- Anmol Mishra
- Jared Hosid
- Michael T. Balonek
- Andrea Dalla Costa
- Malgorzata Malak
- Sergej Kondakov, mga
- Christos Pentedimos
- Flavio Comin
- Natalia Vorontsova
- Denis Rahovetskijyu
- Diana Priscila
- Joào Xàrà Aguiar Da Silva
- Takuya Morimoto
- Seth Oliver Grant
- Michajl Nazarov
- Lisa M. Cottrell-Bentley
- Zillah Bowes
- Tony Reale
- Sergey Chebkasov
- James Marcus Haney
- Justin Peele
- Joaquin Montalvan
- Mauricio Escalona González
- Ali Hisham
- Cec Marquez
- Joseph Choi
- Ashlee Jenita Ferret
- Adrian Cornescian
- Francesco La Regina
- Ismail Youssef
- Dario Peroni
- José Fernando De Miranda
- Gerald McMahon Parsons
- Pankaj Rai
- Clare Olivia Fisher
- Randy Ray Sides
- Derek Broes
- Ida Lai
- Mao Hamamoto
- Lesley Rowland
- Antony M.J.L. Delarue
- Tran Thi Thanh Ha
- Michael Hira
- Brian House
- Pratibha Rolta
- Alberto Ramiro González Benavides
- Johnny Nguyen
- Eduardo Sánchez
- Lilly Lee Jackson
- Torrey Meeks
- Jkeldesh
- Marian Banovski
- Sdenka Zobeida Salas Pilco
- Miguel Curado Malta
- Jeff Dolen
- Ruhel Hamed
- Valentina Rossa
- Destefano Emanuele
- Etienne Heyman
- Renchano Hümtsoe
- Andrea Walter
- Andrea Da'fronza
- Sergio Donato
- Sergey Ligun
- Ben Cupczak
- Thiago Fazolari Meyer
- Jack Attridge
- Joseph Bolz
- Maria Fernanda Ferraz De Camargo
- Edward J. McNelis
- Mark Steven Mocarski
- Michel Gauthier jr
- Rachel Brown
  and Tegan Bukowski
- Laura Lemijnyete
- Alfredo A. Oliveira
- Alexander St. John Westby Simcock
- Maria Antonieta Carelda Cansieco
- Marius Ionut Calu
- Denis Baroi
- Elisa Pennino
- Michael Cooper
- Anne Crossey
- Christopher Redmont
- Meuke Van Herwijnen
- Kartik Chaturvedi
- Dave Davidson
- Jennifer Wardle
- Kiril Kostov
- Christopher Brian Hebrot
- Timothy Kiernan
- Guy Hawkins
- Nicholas Gallucci
  and Emmanuele Pickett
- Anastasiya Fadeeva
- Mischa Hrziwnatzki
- Dean Boysen
- Alberto Lama
- Gilbert Ndahayo
- Pisanu Mhokprakhon
- Shehab Elnoury
- Brian Hendrix
- David Jacques
- Ryan Peter Reis
- Don Thrash
- Rebecca McEvoy
  and Keith McEvoy
- Rustom Bailey Iraní
- Mareike Herberg
- John Walkley
- Andrea Salvatori
- Alejandro Angel T.
- Sophie Kolb
- Ian Service
- Maureen Ravelo
- Bairmuc2010
- Roberto Corso
- Roger Szilagyi
- Besnik Hyseni
- Andrew Coleman
- Sonya Mishieva
- Drake Shannon
- Haley Cummings
- Naotomo Umewaka
- Herman Daniel Afanador Jiménez
- Patrick Flanary
- Jason Bohenek
- Denis Pryanikov
- Baitijrin Alexander Muhammedovic
  and Ardilanov Renat Valerevich
- Pedro Nuno Tavarez Barcelos G. Lobito
- Jens Gottschalk
- Alex Peacher
- Anthony Sheppard
- Jose Alderson
- Glenn Vivares
- Balog Zsofia
- Manasvi Kumar
- Hassan Isa Aldoy
- Peter Njogu
- Kevin McMahon
- John X. Demaio
- Logan Needham
- Angélique A.E. Georges
- Frederik Boje
- Raul Rivas
- Socrates Cuadri
- Alan Teitel
- Tom Robinson
- Louie Rodríguez
- Massoud Hossaini
- Stephanie Steenstra
- Sherkhan Mateen
- Albina
- Farzana Wahidy
- Timothy A. Conneally
- Frederic Lumiere
  and Jane Haubrich
- David Chappelow
- M. Dowod Taban
- Georgia Merton
- Giuseppe Mattia
- John Paul Mallo
- Natalia Andreadis
- Jessica Geltz
- Leah Collum
- Massomi Sultani
- Rachel Hart
- Shir Decker
- Noorshah Noorani
- Alberta Álvarez Portela
- Jessie Brisendine
- Robin Bordeaux
- Esther De Blu
- Johanna Nifosi
- Natalie Itzkowic
- Han Siu
- Mojca Breceli
- Brad Sorensen
- Amy Levandosky
- Benjamin Richey
- Neil Tuttle
- Ina Angelina Foerster
- Bernhard Kleine-Frauns
- Christopher Farrell
- Thorben Winkler
- David Peter
- Frank De Vries
- Iddimus
- Christian Dremsa
- Mareike Sehr
- Marcus Gebauer
- Sven Matika
- Timo Jenderny
- Bjorn Neumann
- Daniel Montau
- Shankar Karuppayah
- Andrew K.
- Maike Spieker
- Sinan Lafci
- Aliriza Guler
- Kevin Meister
- Erfan Asgari Aragh
- Bojan Kekezovic
- Jen Kleinhenz
- Jobal Ferreira Almeida
- Dawud Havard
- Sergius Sutanto
- Alex Tak Lam Chan
- Johannes Dinda
- Samuel Cockedey
- Bo Kovich
- Carry Premiere
- Rico Damacen
- Marcus Tedenryd
- Timothy Stevens
- Gabor Kukucska
- Alison Segar
- Gaby Aguirre Apaza
- Susan Harper
- Daniel Mas Castane
- Shahin Najafipour
- Alan John Smith
- Marx Success Jr.
- Ashley B. Fisher
- Erick Henning
- Nakagawa Kazuhiko
- Joaquin Granados Ortega
- Neil Fisher
- Sean Charles Denny
- Igor Lymar
- Anna Vakhotska
- Ermete Ricci
- Sara Isabel Amorim Marinho
- Satoshi Onabuchi
- Betsy DelValley
- Tomasz Skowronski
- Dorgas Muller
- Joris Mathei
- Simone Pessoa
- Kittikhun Srisathit

== Follow-on projects and legacy ==
In October 2011, BBC News announced that Britain in a Day would be funded by BBC Learning as part of BBC's "Cultural Olympiad," with the Britain in a Day YouTube channel accepting video contributions from the public about their lives on a specific day: 12 November 2011. Scott oversaw the project with executive producer Macdonald (both from Life in a Day) and director Morgan Mathews.

In 2012 directors Philip Martin and Gaku Narita teamed up to create Japan in a Day which accounts of the aftermath from Japan's devastating tsunami in 2011 featuring YouTube videos shot by survivors living in and near the affected areas.

Macdonald and Scott also created Christmas in a Day (November 2013) a forty-eight-minute YouTube documentary on which a 3.5-minute advertisement for U.K. supermarket Sainsbury's was based. The film constituted crowd-sourced clips recorded on Christmas 2012.

Italy in a Day (September 2014), directed by Gabriele Salvatores, included clips selected from 45,000 crowd-sourced video submissions recorded on 26 October 2013, and premiered during the 71st Venice International Film Festival.

The production house behind Italy in a Day is teaming with Scott Free Productions to produce Israel in a Day, with Germany and France also working on their own versions in the format.

India in a Day was released in 2015.

Spain in a Day by Isabel Coixet was released in 2016.

Canada in a Day was released in 2017.

UN in a Day, directed by Rubén Mendoza which count a day (August 24) to all the members of the Universidad Nacional de Colombia in celebration of its 150th anniversary. That Movie was released in 2017.

Panama in a Day was released in 2019.

Life in a Day 2020 was released in 2021.

== See also ==
- Love Parade disaster
