= Charles H. Gates =

American frontiersman and fortune hunter

Charles Howard Gates (known as Swiftwater Bill; April 7, 1854 – February 13, 1933) was an American frontiersman and fortune hunter, and a fixture in stories of the Klondike Gold Rush.

In one famous Klondike story he presented Dawson dance hall girl Gussie Lamore her weight in gold. Gates was married briefly to Grace Lamore in 1898; he later married Bera Beebe, with whom he fathered two sons, Fredrick and Clifford. Gates subsequently abandoned her for 15-year-old Kitty Brandon, his niece. His biography The True Life Story of Swiftwater Bill Gates (c. 1908) was authored by Iola Beebe, his mother-in-law.

Gates was known to be at the gold fields of Nome, Alaska at the same time as William H Gates I, grandfather of the Microsoft founder. However, despite the similarity in name and coincidences of gold, there is no apparent family relationship between "Swiftwater Bill" and Microsoft founder Bill Gates.

In fiction, he has been portrayed by Gordon Pinsent in the 1985 film Klondike Fever and Colin Cunningham in the 2014 miniseries Klondike.
