= Klondike (miniseries) =

2014 television miniseries

- Genre: Historical drama
- Based on: Gold Diggers: Striking It Rich in the Klondike by Charlotte Gray
- Screenplay by: Paul Scheuring; Josh Goldin; Rachel Abramowitz
- Directed by: Simon Cellan Jones
- Starring: Abbie Cornish; Marton Csokas; Ian Hart; Greg Lawson; Conor Leslie; Richard Madden; Tim Blake Nelson; Augustus Prew; Johnny Simmons; Tim Roth; Sam Shepard
- Theme music composer: Adrian Johnston
- Country of origin: United States
- Original language: English
- No. of episodes: 3

Production
- Producers: Ridley Scott; Paul Scheuring; David W. Zucker; John Morayniss; Michael Rosenberg; Eileen O'Neill; Dolores Gavin; Chad Oakes; Mike Frislev; Clara George; Josh Goldin; Rachel Abramowitz
- Cinematography: Mike Eley
- Editors: Oral Norrie Ottey; Kristina Hetherington
- Running time: 272 minutes
- Production companies: Scott Free Productions; Discovery Channel; Entertainment One; Nomadic Pictures

Original release
- Network: Discovery Channel
- Release: January 20 – January 22, 2014

Klondike is a three-part miniseries about the Klondike Gold Rush that was broadcast by the Discovery Channel on January 20–22, 2014. Based on Charlotte Gray's novel Gold Diggers: Striking It Rich in the Klondike, it is the Discovery Channel's first scripted miniseries. Klondike was directed by Simon Cellan Jones and stars Richard Madden as Bill Haskell, a real-life adventurer who traveled to Yukon, Canada, in the late 1890s during the gold rush.

== Premise ==
Traveling west from New York City, friends Bill Haskell and Byron Epstein head to Yukon, Canada, when they learn of the Klondike Gold Rush. The two men must not only contend with harsh conditions and unpredictable weather as they look to profit from a mining claim near Dawson City, but also find themselves threatened by desperate and dangerous individuals who share their pursuit of riches.

== Cast ==
=== Main ===
- Abbie Cornish as Belinda Mulrooney, a powerful entrepreneur who later allies herself with Bill
- Marton Csokas as the superintendent, the head of Dawson City's North-West Mounted Police detachment
- Ian Hart as Soapy Smith, a grifter looking to profit from Dawson City's visitors
- Greg Lawson as Goodman, a former military sharpshooter participating in the gold rush
- Conor Leslie as Sabine, a courtesan and later assistant to Father Judge
- Richard Madden as Bill Haskell, a recent college graduate who travels west with Byron to partake in the gold rush
- Tim Blake Nelson as Joe Meeker, a bartender employed by Belinda who becomes Bill's partner
- Augustus Prew as Byron Epstein, Bill's ambitious friend and traveling companion
- Johnny Simmons as Jack London, a young adventurer and aspiring writer
- Tim Roth as the count, an immoral, self-proclaimed aristocrat and Belinda's chief business rival
- Sam Shepard as Father Judge, a humanitarian priest seeking to establish the first church in Dawson City

=== Guest ===
- Colin Cunningham as Swiftwater Bill, a prospector
- Michael Greyeyes as Cheyeho, the chief of a Tlingit leader tribe
- Brian Markinson as Cavendesh, a government official
- Adrian Hough as Dan Condon, Belinda's loyal right hand
- Ron Selmour as Sundown, the leader of the count's henchmen

== Production ==
Klondike was green-lit by the Discovery Channel in December 2012. The network believed the miniseries would complement their other offerings, such as the reality series Gold Rush and Jungle Gold. Executive producer Dolores Gavin stated, "Our audience loves the idea of the frontier spirit. That whole thing about man versus nature, man versus man, man versus self—those are themes we talk about everyday on Discovery. There was really no difference when we started talking about this project because there were those similarities." It is the network's first-ever scripted miniseries, and contains six parts.

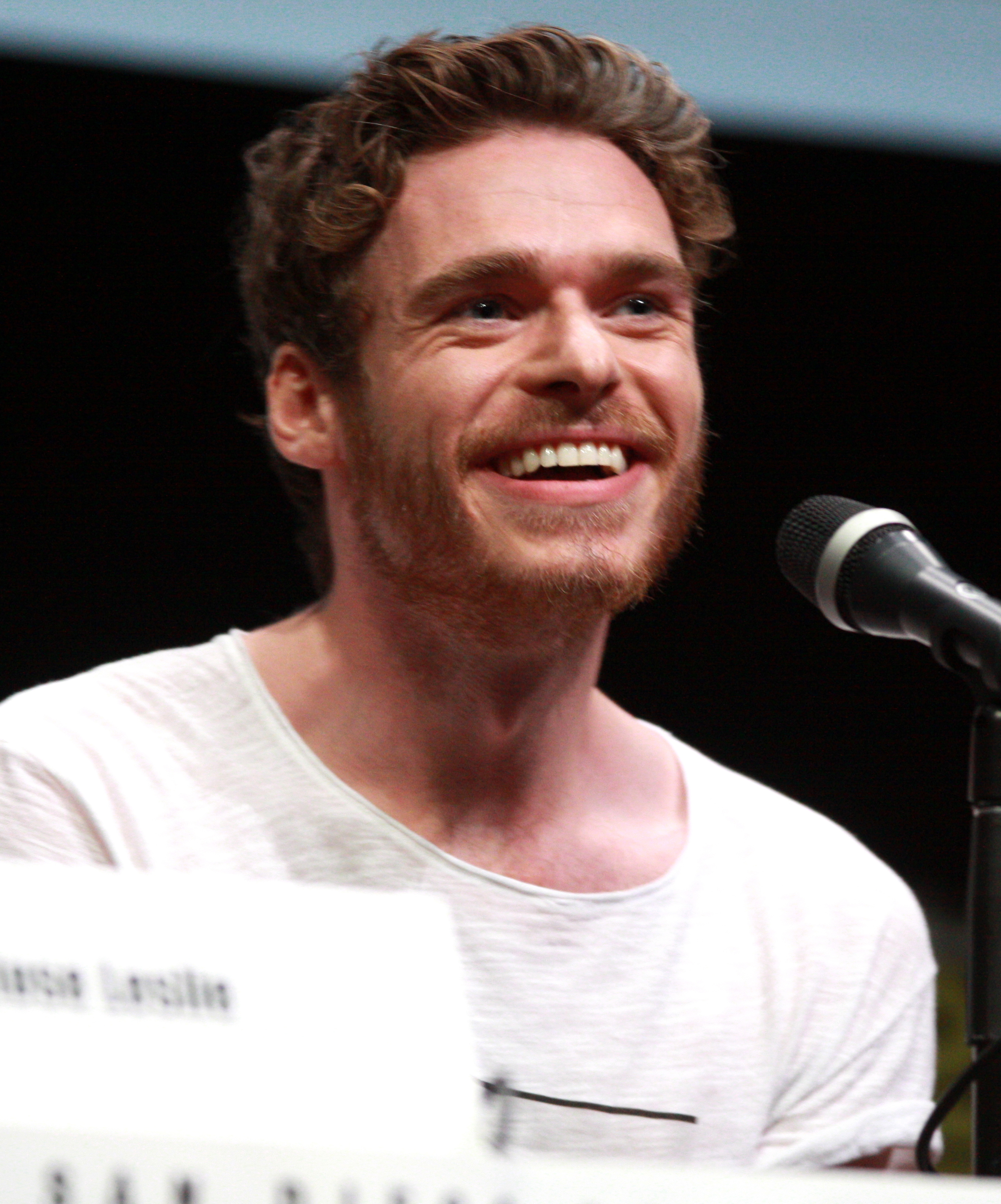
Actor Richard Madden portrays adventurer Bill Haskell

Set in the late 1890s, it is based upon Charlotte Gray's book Gold Diggers: Striking It Rich in the Klondike and follows a variety of individuals as they flood into the Klondike in search of gold. Ridley Scott is serving as executive producer, and said "Klondike was the last great gold rush; one which triggered a flood of prospectors ill-equipped, emotionally or otherwise, for the extreme and grueling conditions of the remote Yukon wilderness. The personal adventures are as epic as the landscape, where ambition, greed, sex and murder, as well as their extraordinary efforts to literally strike it rich, are all chronicled by a young Jack London himself." Paul Scheuring, Josh Goldin and Rachel Abramowitz are penning the script.

Production began in March 2013 in Alberta, with Simon Cellan Jones directing. It was expected to take 54 days to shoot six hours of footage. Some of filming took place in April on Fortress Mountain in Kananaskis Country, where the cast contended with "frigid" conditions. A set was created on the CL Ranch (west of Calgary) to represent Dawson City. There, the crew experienced warm weather, which created problems as the actors were forced to wear many layers of clothing and pretend they were cold.

Richard Madden was cast as adventurer Bill Haskell. He agreed to join the miniseries because he was impressed by its script; he also enjoyed Discovery's reality series Gold Rush. The actor explained to Entertainment Weekly in August 2013, "It’s epic, and 'epic' is a word I use rarely to describe something. It’s a story that’s not really been told. [The character's] situations are so extreme physically and emotionally. I’ve done lots of different [projects] and I’ve never been so excited." For the role, Madden had to learn mountaineering in Alberta and at one point was required to jump into river rapids with a grade of 4. He made sure to research his real-life counterpart in books and biographies. He had to contend with high altitudes and wind machines, and noted that the adverse conditions helped him get into character.

== Episodes ==
No.	Title	Directed by	Teleplay by	Original release date	U.S. viewers (millions)
1–2	"Part 1"	Simon Cellan Jones	Paul Scheuring	January 20, 2014	1.1
1–2	"Part 1"	Simon Cellan Jones	Josh Goldin; Rachel Abramowitz	January 20, 2014	1.1
Bill Haskell and Byron Epstein begin a journey towards the Yukon when a prospector informs them of the ongoing gold rush. Persevering through natural hazards, they eventually reach Dawson City. On their way to the town, they meet Father Judge, Sabine, and Soapy Smith. Belinda Mulrooney introduces herself to Bill as the owner of Dawson City's lumber mill. Bill and Byron purchase mining claims to begin their search for gold. Byron is murdered by an unknown assailant. His claim goes to Belinda, who sends Joe to work with Bill. A North-West Mounted Police detachment investigates the crime. The detachment's superintendent believes Byron was murdered by the Tlingit tribe. When Bill and Jack meet with the Tlingit, however, they deny involvement in the crime. Nevertheless, a Tlingit man and his young son are arrested. Bill meets Goodman, who lost his thumb in combat. The Count threatens to kill Father Judge and burn down his church to replace it with his business. Father Judge contemplates leaving, but ultimately continues work on his church. Bill disregards an offer from Soapy to sell his claim, intending to remain in Dawson City until Byron's killer is found.
3–4	"Part 2"	Simon Cellan Jones	Paul Scheuring	January 21, 2014	1.0
3–4	"Part 2"	Simon Cellan Jones	Josh Goldin; Rachel Abramowitz	January 21, 2014	1.0
Dawson City becomes afflicted by a typhus outbreak. Father Judge brings the sick into his church to be treated. After the Count publicly degrades Sabine, Belinda takes her to Father Judge to change her life. The superintendent develops doubts towards Tlingit natives' guilt, which grow when the Tlingit man is unable to perform the shot that killed Byron. When Bill's lumber supply runs low, Belinda personally delivers a new supply. An accident forces Belinda to spend the night with Bill and the two have sex. Shortly afterwards, Bill learns that Belinda sold the claim to Soapy and Soapy intends to foreclose the next day. The superintendent's request to have a trial for the Tlingit natives is blocked by his Cavendesh, who wants them hanged immediately. Bill discovers gold, allowing him to buy the claim back from Soapy. Byron's killer reveals his crime to Father Judge in a confessional and says he will kill again. Father Judge and Sabine unsuccessfully advocate for the Tlingit to be released, although the superintendent continues to delay the execution. Bill and Joe survive an attempt on their lives when a mysterious figure tries to bury them in their mine. With winter approaching, Jack returns home. Belinda, afflicted by typhus, sells her lumber mill to the Count. After recovering, she begins selling lumber for credit, causing the Count to lose money and be unable to pay his men.
5–6	"Part 3"	Simon Cellan Jones	Josh Goldin; Rachel Abramowitz	January 22, 2014	0.8
5–6	"Part 3"	Simon Cellan Jones	Paul Scheuring	January 22, 2014	0.8
Bill learns that Goodman is Byron's killer. Goodman admits that he killed Byron and is behind the attempts on Bill's life because he believes Bill's claim belongs to him. While pursuing Goodman through the wilderness, Bill is cornered by the Count and his men, seeking to steal his gold. The Count is betrayed by his men, who abandon him and Bill in the wilderness. The Tlingit attack Dawson City to rescue their captive tribe members, killing Soapy and three Mounties in the process. Mounties led by the superintendent pursue the Tlingit. Belinda also goes into the wilderness when she learns of Bill's whereabouts. Belinda rescues Bill and helps him return to health. The two track down Goodman and Belinda kills him in a shootout. The superintendent captures the Cheyeho and hangs him for the Mounties' deaths. Offered a promotion, the superintendent resigns out of contempt for Cavendesh. The Count's frozen corpse is brought into town. Bill learns from Joe that the Count's men stole a block of gold, but the remaining gold is safely hidden in their latrine. Bill asks Belinda to return with him, but she declines. Sabine and other Dawson City residents hold a parade for the dying Father Judge to celebrate his contributions to the town. While Bill and Joe are crossing the frozen river, Joe falls through the ice and drowns, taking his gold with him. A year later, Father Judge dies, Belinda opens her hotel, and Bill becomes a citrus farmer. Ending titles reveal that Father Judge's church burned down, Joe's remains and gold were never recovered, Jack gained literary fame before his death, the superintendent served with distinction in World War I, Belinda died as a penniless housekeeper, and Bill went missing after returning to the Klondike in 1901.

== Reception ==
The miniseries received positive reviews from critics and holds an 80% approval rating on Rotten Tomatoes, based on 15 reviews. The site consensus reads, "Discovery Channel's first scripted drama, Klondike not only contains an admirable adventure plot, but a masterful exploration of landscapes and cinematography." On Metacritic, the miniseries holds a score of 74 out of 100 based on 19 critics, indicating "generally favorable reviews".

=== Ratings ===
Episode(s)	Date	Viewers (millions)	18–49 Rating
Part One	January 20, 2014	3.434	1.1
Part Two	January 21, 2014	3.128	1.0
Part Three	January 22, 2014	2.855	0.8
