= Belinda Mulrooney =

American business woman

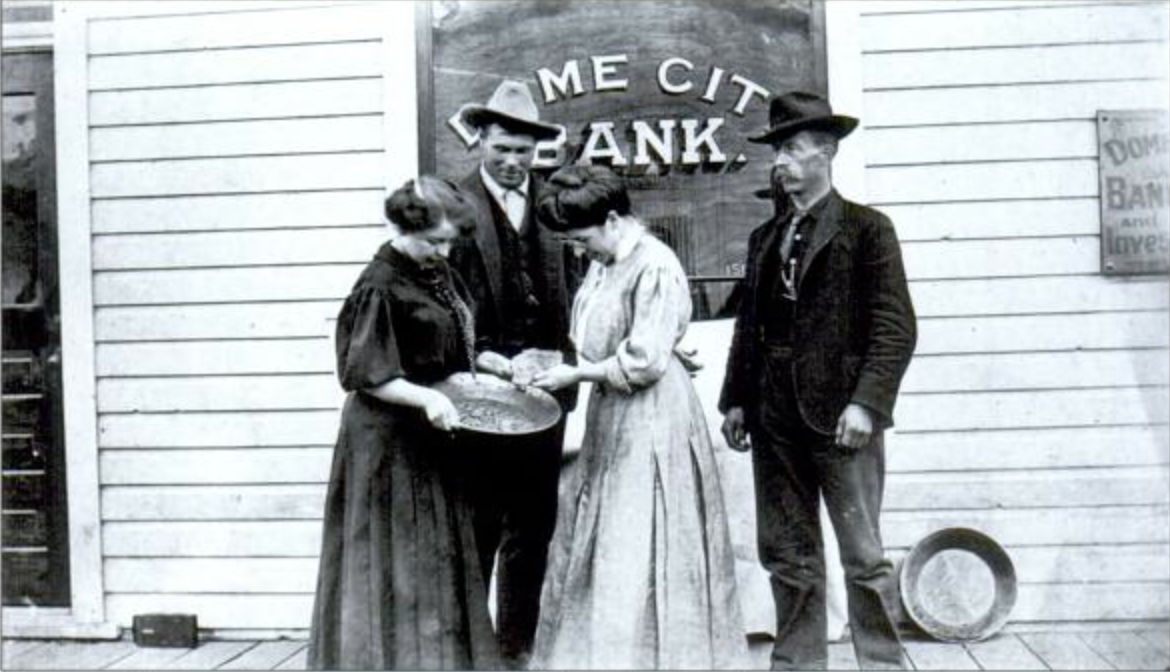
- Mulrooney (center) in front of the Dome City Bank, which she founded
- Born: May 16, 1872; County Sligo, Ireland
- Died: September 3, 1967 (aged 95); Seattle, Washington, United States
- Occupations: Entrepreneur, hotel owner, bank founder

Belinda Mulrooney (1872–1967) was an entrepreneur and purportedly the "richest woman in the Klondike". She made one fortune in the Klondike Gold Rush, lost it, and amassed a second, which lasted most of the rest of her life.

== Biography ==
Mulrooney was born in County Sligo, Ireland. When she was young, her family either emigrated to Pennsylvania, where her father worked as a miner in Scranton, or sent her to live with relatives there. She set out on her own and operated a sandwich stand during the 1893 World's Columbian Exposition in Chicago. With her profits, she traveled to San Francisco in 1894 to set up an ice cream parlor. Undaunted when she lost everything in a fire, she found employment as a stewardess on the Pacific Coast Steamship Company ship S.S. City of Topeka plying its route from California to Alaska, earning extra money by selling necessities and luxuries to the passengers. Discovery of gold at Juneau, Alaska, motivated her to move north in 1896. Then came the Klondike Gold Rush in Canada to the east.

Instead of seeking her fortune as a prospector, Mulrooney bought supplies of "silk underwear, bolts of cotton cloth and hot water bottles" with her savings of $5,000 and transported them over the Chilkoot Pass to Dawson City, where she sold them for six times that amount in June 1897. She built a restaurant in Dawson, next a roadhouse called The Magnet, and then the Grand Forks Hotel and restaurant, near the gold fields. Prospering, she started buying mining claims as well; by the end of the year, she either owned or was a partner in five. She sold the hotel for $24,000 and set about building the finest hotel in Dawson. The Fair View Hotel opened its doors on 27 July 1898, with a restaurant and rooms for thirty guests.

Mulrooney once partnered with fellow Klondike legend Alex McDonald to salvage the cargo from a small ship wrecked on a sand bar. McDonald got there first and took all of the food, leaving only gum boots and whiskey for her. She got her revenge, however. The next spring, when McDonald needed boots for his workers, he had to pay her $100 a pair.

On 1 October 1900, Mulrooney married self-styled "Count" Charles Eugene Carbonneau, who claimed to be a French aristocrat, but was actually a champagne salesman and former barber from Quebec. By 1903 or 1904, the couple separated, and she lost her fortune. She obtained a divorce in December 1906.

Starting over, she moved to Fairbanks, Alaska, in 1904 or 1905 and prospered once again. She established the Dome City Bank in Fairbanks with her younger sister Margaret.

Mulrooney eventually retired to Yakima, Washington, where she had a large mansion built c. 1910. She supported her family until her money ran out. She then moved to Seattle, where she died in 1967.

== Depictions in popular culture ==
Abbie Cornish played a fictionalized version of Mulrooney in the Discovery Channel miniseries Klondike. In the TG4 series An Klondike, she was portrayed by Bríd Ní Neachtain and appears in the fictional town of Dominion Creek instead of Dawson City.

== Gallery ==
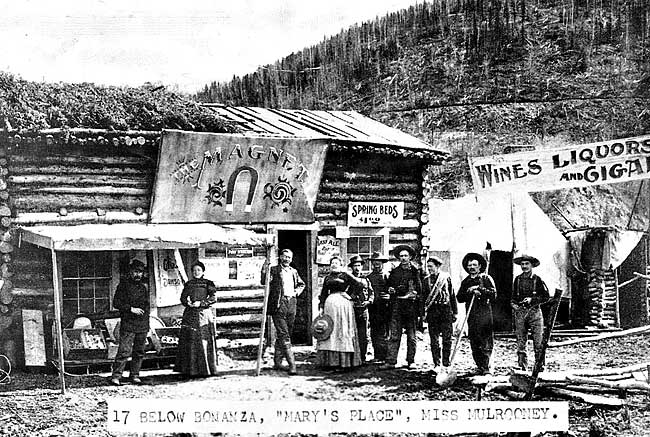
The Magnet road house

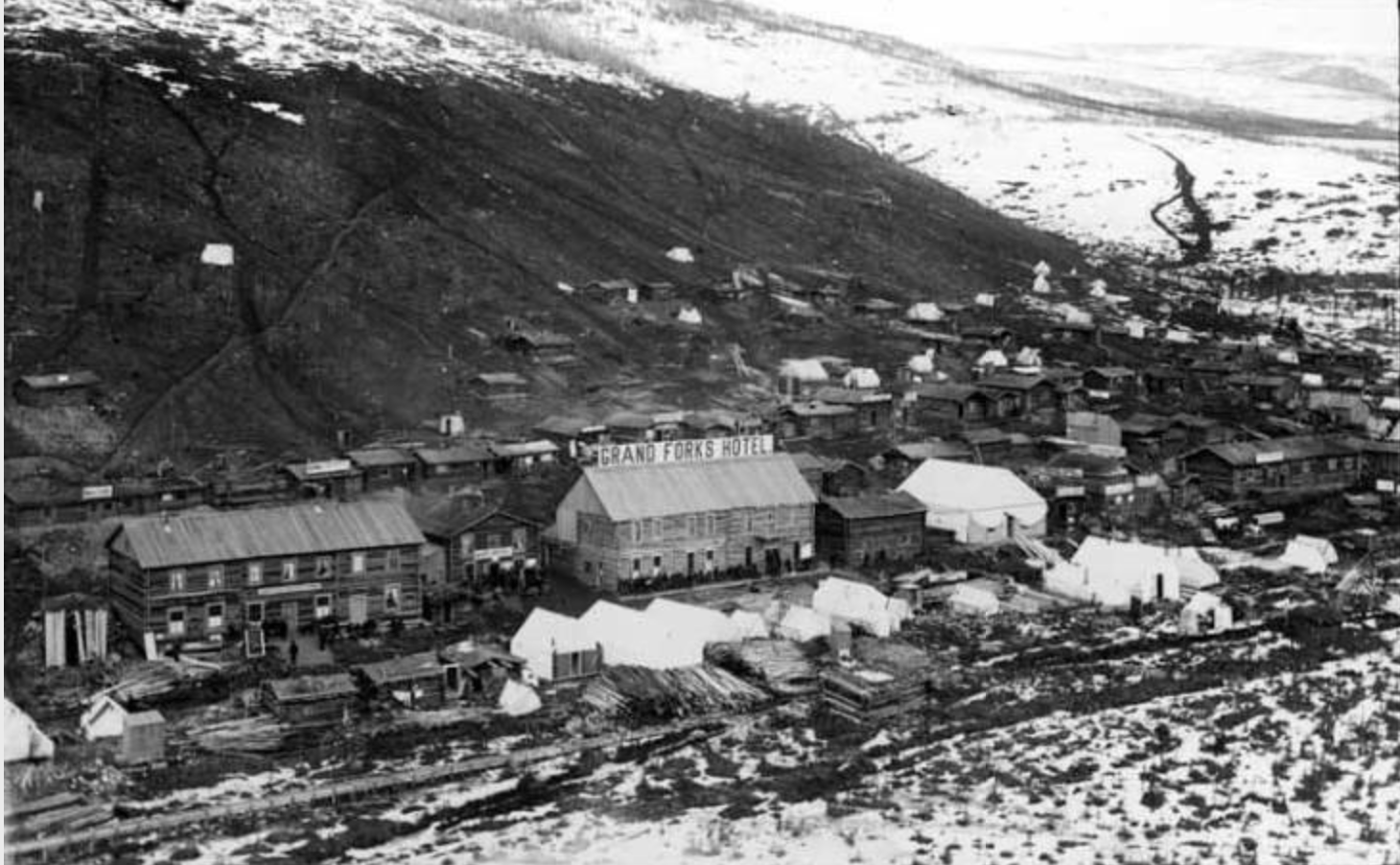
The Grand Forks Hotel, c. 1898

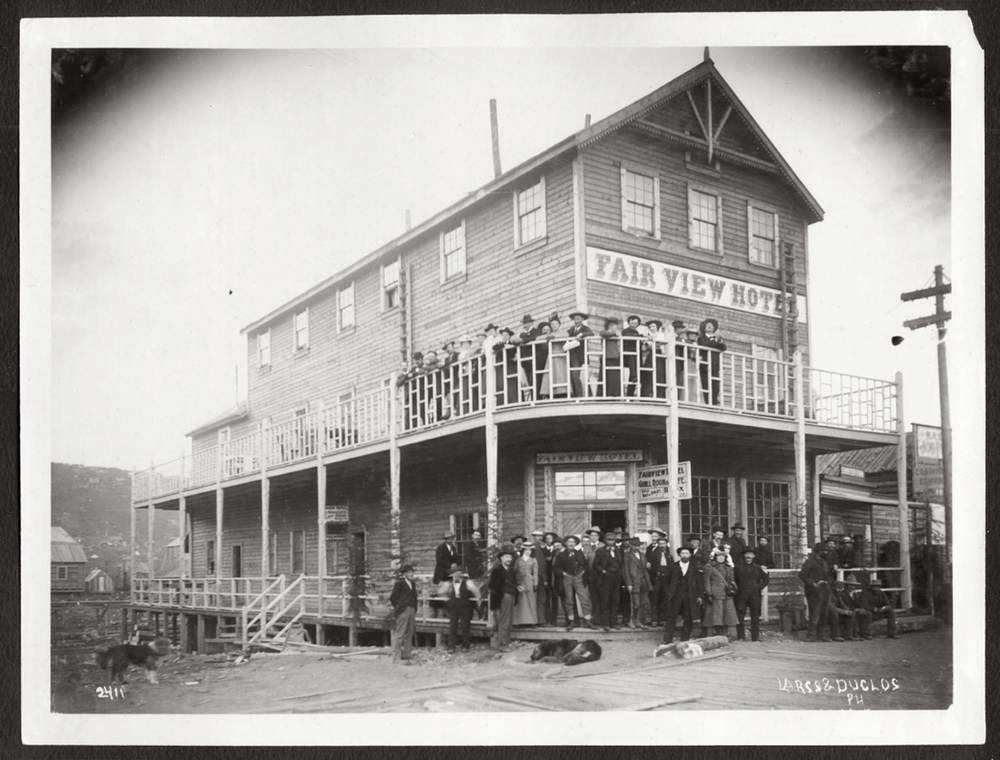
The Fair View Hotel, c. 1899
