= Klondike Fever =

- Directed by: Peter Carter
- Written by: Charles E. Israel; Martin Lager; Jack London (novel)
- Produced by: Harry Alan Towers (executive producer); Gilbert W. Taylor
- Starring: Rod Steiger; Angie Dickinson; Lorne Greene; Jeff East; Barry Morse; Lisa Langlois; Robin Gammell; Gordon Pinsent
- Cinematography: Albert J. Dunk
- Edited by: Stan Cole
- Music by: Hagood Hardy
- Distributed by: International Film Distributors; Lightning Video
- Release dates: January 12, 1980 (U.S.); March 2, 1980 (Canada)
- Running time: 119 minutes
- Country: Canada
- Language: English
- Budget: $4,000,000

Klondike Fever is a 1980 Canadian adventure film, based on the writings of Jack London. It follows London's journey from San Francisco to the Klondike gold fields of the Yukon Territory, Canada in 1898.

== Cast ==
- Jeff East as Jack London
- Rod Steiger as Soapy Smith
- Angie Dickinson as Belinda McNair
- Lorne Greene as Sam Steele
- Barry Morse as John Thornton
- Gordon Pinsent as Swiftwater Bill
- Robin Gammell as Merritt Sloper
- Lisa Langlois as Diamond Tooth Gertie
- Michael Hogan as Will Ryan
- Albert Kubik as card player sitting beside Swiftwater Bill

== Awards ==
- The film earned 9 Genie Award nominations including a Best Performance by an Actor in a Supporting Role for Gordon Pinsent.
