= Cristian Imparato =

Italian singer (born 1996)

- Born: Cristiano Imparato; February 24, 1996 (age 30); Palermo, Italy
- Genres: Pop
- Occupation: singer
- Years active: 2010–present

Cristian Imparato (born February 24, 1996) is an Italian singer best known for winning the first edition of the talent show Io Canto.

== Career ==
When he was young, he sang on the Sicily balcony of his house as the neighbors listened. Cristian had never taken voice or music lessons until the day his older brother made him go to the Mediaset program Io Canto's auditions. He was accepted and went on to the finale, in which he won a trip to study in the United States with David Foster.

In 2024, he returned as a guest on Io Canto and performed "My Heart Will Go On" with Benedetta Caretta.
