= CatDV =

Media asset manager program

- CatDV
- Developer(s): Square Box Systems Ltd.
- Stable release: Version 14
- Operating system: Mac OS X, Microsoft Windows, and Linux
- License: Proprietary
- Website: www.quantum.com

CatDV is a media asset manager program for handling multimedia production workflows developed by Square Box Systems. Quantum Corporation acquired Square Box Systems in 2020.

== Versions ==
The full family of CatDV Products is as follows:

CatDV Standalone Products

- CatDV Professional Edition
- CatDV Pegasus

CatDV Networked Products

- CatDV Essential - entry level server product
- CatDV Enterprise Server - for MySQL databases and most common server platforms including Linux, Windows and Mac OS X
- CatDV Pegasus Server - adds features such as high performance full-text indexing, access control lists, and more
- CatDV Worker Node - automated workflow and transcoding engine
- CatDV Web Client - provides access to the CatDV database via a web browser. There is no need to install special software on the desktop, making it easy to deploy to a large number of users.
- CatDV Professional Edition & Pegasus Clients - designed to support the multi-user capabilities of the CatDV Enterprise and Workgroup Servers from the desktop

Using plugins and scripting, which often require additional professional services support to set up, complex integrations with a wide variety of third party systems (including archive, cloud storage, and artificial intelligence) are possible.

== Awards ==
CatDV won two awards in 2010, a blue ribbon from Creative COW Magazine and a "Best of Show Vidy Award" from Videography.

In April 2012 Square Box won a Queen's Award for Enterprise for CatDV.
