= Britain in a Day =

- Title card
- Directed by: Morgan Matthews
- Produced by: Ridley Scott
- Production companies: Scott Free Productions; YouTube, Inc.
- Distributed by: BBC 2
- Release date: 11 June 2012 (BBC 2)
- Running time: 90 minutes
- Country: United Kingdom
- Language: English

Britain in a Day is a crowdsourced documentary film that consists of a series clips of footage shot by members of the public in Britain on 12 November 2011. Scott Free Films and the BBC produced the film, which was made in conjunction with YouTube.

The film is 90 minutes long and includes shots from 314 different perspectives out of the 11,526 submitted onto the video sharing website YouTube. The film was premiered in cinemas and broadcast on BBC2 on 11 June 2012 for a general audience, as part of the Cultural Olympiad.

Billed as a follow-up to the 2011 documentary film Life in a Day, the film was similarly executive produced by Ridley Scott and Kevin Macdonald. The film was directed by Morgan Matthews.

== Cast & Crew ==
- Saranne Bensusan
- Jonathan Berry
- Lee John Blackmore
- Jack Keane
- Lawrence Mallinson
- Robin Whittaker
- Graham Sutton
- Andrea Dalla Costa
- Jonathan Proud
- Jack Arbuthnott
- Billy Dosanjh
- Ann Lynch
- Martin Phipps
- Peter Christelis
- Yefri Zuñiga
- Chris Hunter
- Ben Mills
- Hugo Adams
- Danny Freemantle
- Glenn Freemantle
- Eilam Hoffman
- Emilie O'Connor
- Adam Scrivener
- Ian Tapp
- Craig Brewin
- Archie Campbell
- Bec Cranswick
- Raquel Alvarez
- Alex Ash
- Corinne Borgeaud
- Sean James
- Thomas Carrell
- Matt Curtis
- Jemma Gander
- Caroline Gerard
- Iain Griffiths
- Ross Howieson
- Olivia Humphreys
- Amy Jackson
- Joseph Matthews
- Helen Mullane
- Mike Nicholls
- Rebecca Pearson
- Claire Salter
- Johannes Schaff
- Daniel Thomas
- Richard Thorburn
- Elliot Weaver
- Zander Weaver
- Chloe White
- Callum McPherson
- Babs van Gilst
- Ernest Hope Stephenson

== See also ==
- Time capsule
