= William Judge =

Priest and hospital founder

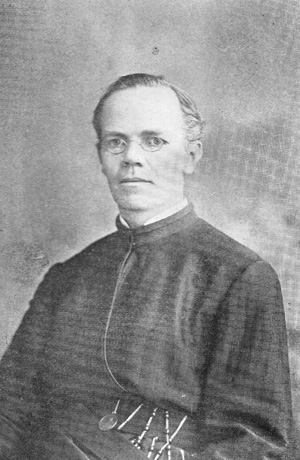
- Born: April 28, 1850; Baltimore, Maryland, US
- Died: January 16, 1899 (aged 48)
- Occupation: Priest
- Church: St. Mary's Hospital

Father William Judge (April 28, 1850 – January 16, 1899) was a Jesuit priest who, during the 1897 Klondike Gold Rush, established St. Mary's Hospital, a facility in Dawson City which provided shelter, food and any available medicine to the many hard-luck gold miners who filled the town and its environs. For his selfless and tireless work, Judge became known as "The Saint of Dawson".

== Biography ==
Judge was born into a religious family in Baltimore, Maryland. His brother Charles became a Sulpician. Upon joining the Jesuits in 1890, at the age of forty, William Judge volunteered to go to Alaska. He served for two years at Holy Cross Mission, on the Yukon River, before being assigned to a smaller mission at Nulato, Alaska. There he built a church and taught the native children. He was then reassigned to the small mining town of Forty Mile, Yukon. He established a mission there in 1894. When gold was discovered in the Klondike, practically the entire community relocated there. He followed, arriving in Dawson City in March 1897.

He acquired 3 acres (1.2 ha) and set about building a hospital, church and residence. The hospital was completed on August 20, 1897. Until the arrival of the Sisters of St. Anne in the summer of the following year, he worked single-handedly, raising funds, supervising the construction and the hospital, and tending to his congregation. During his time in the missions, Fr. Judge and his fellow missionaries often faced severe challenges brought on by the unforgiving environment, including cold, strong rivers and seas, sickness and food shortages. This experience, developed over the course of seven years in the Arctic, uniquely prepared Judge to minister to the citizens of Dawson.

Judge's humanitarian work became known due to the writings of Jack London, whose health and possibly life were saved by the priest. As later self-described, London, like many others involved in the Gold Rush, became malnourished and developed scurvy. London's gums became swollen, leading to the loss of his four front teeth, a constant gnawing pain affected his abdomen and leg muscles, and his face was stricken with sores. Through Judge's ministrations, he and many others recovered their health.

Father Judge died on January 16, 1899, of pneumonia. A man of poor health to begin with, he was worn out by his exertions. The whole town mourned and turned out for his funeral. His grave can be viewed behind the remains of the second church built in Dawson (at the end of Front Street). St. Mary's Hospital remained in Dawson City until it burned down in 1950.

== Popular culture ==
A fictionalized version of Judge appears in the Discovery Channel miniseries Klondike, portrayed by Sam Shepard. The miniseries depicts Judge as being older than his real life counterpart, who died at the age of 48. He is played by Clive Geraghty in the TG4 series An Klondike, which, in addition to also portraying him as older than the real Judge, changes his nationality to Irish and presents him as establishing a church and hospital in the fictional town of Dominion Creek before dying in 1898 instead of 1899.
