= Scott Free Productions =

British-American production company

- Logo used since 1998, drawn by Italian artist and animator Gianluigi Toccafondo
- Formerly: Scott Free Enterprises; (1970–1980); Percy Main Productions; (1980–1995); Tony Scott Productions; (1980–1995); Ridley Scott Productions; (1980–1995)
- Type: Private
- Industry: Film; Television
- Founded: 1995; 31 years ago
- Founders: Ridley Scott; Tony Scott
- Headquarters: London, England; Los Angeles, California, U.S.
- Key people: Luke Scott (co-CEO); Justin Alvarado Brown (co-CEO); David W. Zucker (CCO); Michael Pruss (president of film); Sharon Hughff (head of UK television)
- Owner: Ridley Scott
- Parent: Ridley Scott Creative Group
- Website: scottfree.com

Scott Free Productions is a British-American film and television production company founded by English filmmakers and brothers Ridley and Tony Scott in 1995. The result of multiple mergers between companies established by the Scott brothers since 1971, it currently has offices in London and Los Angeles.

The company has produced films such as G.I. Jane (1997), Enemy of the State (1998), Gladiator (2000), Black Hawk Down (2001), Hannibal (2001), Matchstick Men (2003), Man on Fire (2004), Kingdom of Heaven (2005), American Gangster (2007), Prometheus (2012), Blade Runner 2049 (2017), House of Gucci (2021), Alien: Romulus (2024), and Gladiator II (2024), as well as television series such as The Good Wife (2009–2016).

== History ==
The Scott brothers formed the production company Scott Free Enterprises in 1970 and the film development company Percy Main Productions in 1980, naming the latter after the village where their father grew up. On July 1, 1992, Percy Main Productions signed a production deal with Paramount Pictures to produce its feature films. In 1993, the Scott brothers' companies were all merged into a single entity, later renamed Scott Free Productions in 1995, and signed distribution agreements with American studio 20th Century Fox, Italian studio RCS Video, and British studio Majestic Films International.

On September 25, 1995, the Scotts moved to Disney, and Largo Entertainment took over international distribution of its product. In 1996, the Scotts signed a secondary agreement with Intermedia to finance some of its films.

In November 1997, the Scotts moved full-time to PolyGram Filmed Entertainment, where they produced feature films for the studio, terminating its contracts with Disney and Intermedia.

On October 12, 1999, Scott Free Productions entered a two-year production deal with The Walt Disney Studios and Jerry Bruckheimer Films, after its original deal with Universal, which was inherited from PolyGram Filmed Entertainment ended. There, the company produced Black Hawk Down for Bruckheimer.

On September 21, 2001, Scott Free was moved to 20th Century Fox, and Fox produced its feature films, after its previous agreement with producer Jerry Bruckheimer ended. After Disney's acquisition of 21st Century Fox on March 20, 2019 and Disney dropped the “Fox” name from the studio's 20th Century Fox and Fox Searchlight Pictures branding and the two studios were renamed 20th Century Studios and Searchlight Pictures, respectively on January 17, 2020, Scott Free returned to Disney.

On November 6, 2002, Scott Free signed a television contract with CBS to produce its television shows airing on the network.

On January 23, 2005, Numbers became Scott Free's first hit series for television. The strategy repeated on September 22, 2009 when Scott Free produced its second hit series The Good Wife.

On August 21, 2012, company co-founder Tony Scott committed suicide by jumping from the Vincent Thomas Bridge in Los Angeles.

In August 2022, Scott Free signed on to create an Apple TV+ eight-part crime drama Sinking Spring, later renamed Dope Thief. The series premiered on March 14, 2025 and marked Ridley Scott's second TV directorial role.

In January 2023, Scott Free signed COO Justin Alvarado Brown in a two-year deal.

In February 2023, ABC News studios announced that they had signed with Scott Free to produce a four part true-crime docuseries for Hulu.

In April 2023, Scott Free announced that they would be working in conjunction with Apple Studios and Sony Pictures to produce Napoleon, a historical action directed by Ridley Scott that stars Joaquin Phoenix as the French conqueror Napoleon Bonaparte.

Scott Free has offices in London and Los Angeles. It works with Ridley Scott's sister company RSA Films by assisting directors in film and television.

In February 2024, it was announced that Scott Free Productions would be working with GK Films and Paramount Pictures on a Bee Gees biopic titled You Should Be Dancing, directed by Ridley Scott and written by John Logan. The film was set to begin production in October 2025 in London and Miami.

== Production logo ==
Since 1998, the company's production logo has been a watercolour-style traditional animation of a crudely drawn monk with a white haze surrounding him, walking and smoking a cigarette before running and transforming into a bird. The company name appears underneath the bird as the colours change to turquoise on a black background. The logo was created by Italian artist and animator Gianluigi Toccafondo.
